= Yeftah Norkin =

Israeli military officer

- יפתח נורקין
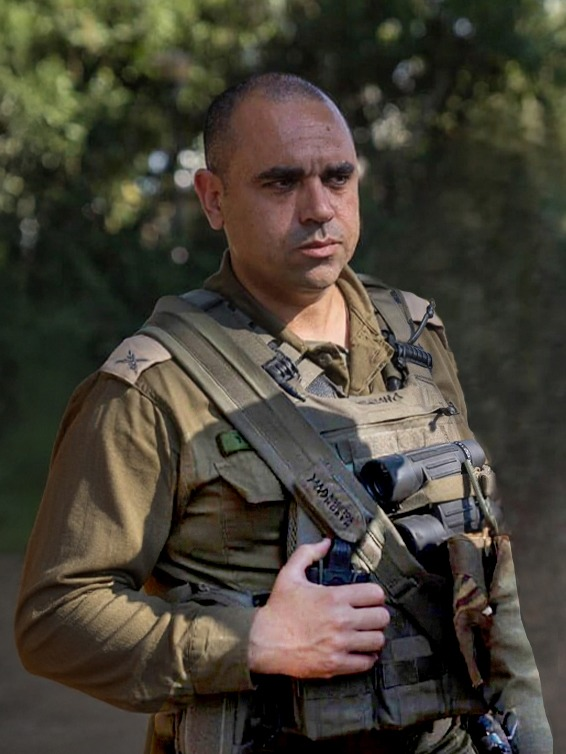
- Born: 15 January 1981 (age 45); Moshav Beit Shaarim
- Military career
- Allegiance: Israel
- Branch: Israel Defense Forces
- Service years: 1999–present
- Rank: Tat-Aluf
- Unit: Israeli Ground Forces
- Commands: 146th Division
- Conflicts: Operation Cast Lead; Operation Pillar of Defense; Operation Brother's Keeper; Operation Protective Edge; Operation Northern Shield; Operation Swords of Iron; Northern Arrows; 2024 Israeli invasion of Lebanon

Yeftah Norkin (Hebrew: יפתח נורקין; born January 15, 1981) is an IDF officer with the rank of Brigadier General who serves as the commander of the 146th "Hamapatz" Division. Previously he served as the commander of the 7th Armored Brigade, the commander of the Ephraim Brigade (under the Judea and Samaria Division), an operations officer of the Galilee Division and the commander of the 77th battalion.

== Biography ==
Norkin was born and raised in Moshav Beit Shaarim. He conscripted to the Israel Defense Forces to the Armored Corps in 1999, and was assigned to the 74th Battalion in the 188th Brigade. He went through a training course as a fighter, a tank commanders' course and an armored officers' course. At the end of the course, he was appointed commander of a tank platoon in Company V in the 77th Battalion in the 7th Brigade. During his position, he commanded an encounter with terrorists in Tulkarm and led the platoon in Operation Defensive Wall. He later served as a team commander in the Armored Officers Course. He was later appointed commander of the 77th Battalion between 2004 and 2005–2006, he led the company in operational activity in the Gaza Strip until the withdrawal from the Gaza Strip. At the end of the position he was released from the IDF. After the Second Lebanon War, he returned to service, underwent an infantry conversion and was appointed commander of the 7th PALSAR unit between the years 2007–2009, and led it in combat, among other things, in Operation Cast Lead. He then went on to study for a bachelor's degree in law, during which he was asked to return to the service and be appointed head of the staff of the commander of the Southern Command, Tal Russo, and served in the position between 2010 and 2012.

In 2015, he was promoted to the rank of lieutenant colonel and appointed commander of the 77th battalion. He held his position until 2017. After that, he was appointed operations officer of the Galilee Division, and served in the position between 2017 and 2019, among other things in the Operation Northern Shield. On August 14, 2019, he was promoted to the rank of colonel and appointed commander of the Ephraim Brigade, a position he completed on August 10, 2021. On October 3, 2021, he was appointed commander of the 7th Brigade. On July 13, 2023, he completed the This is his role and he went to study.

In June 2024, it was decided that Norkin would be appointed commander of the 146th "Mapatz" Division and be promoted to the rank of Brigadier General and in July 2024 he assumed the position.

Norkin is married and has two children. He holds bachelor's degree in law from Ono Academic College and a master's degree in national security from the University of Haifa. His cousin is the former commander of the Israeli Air Force, Amikam Norkin.
