= Beit She'arim necropolis =

Jewish necropolis at Beit She'arim

Beit She'arim National Park
- IUCN category II (national park)
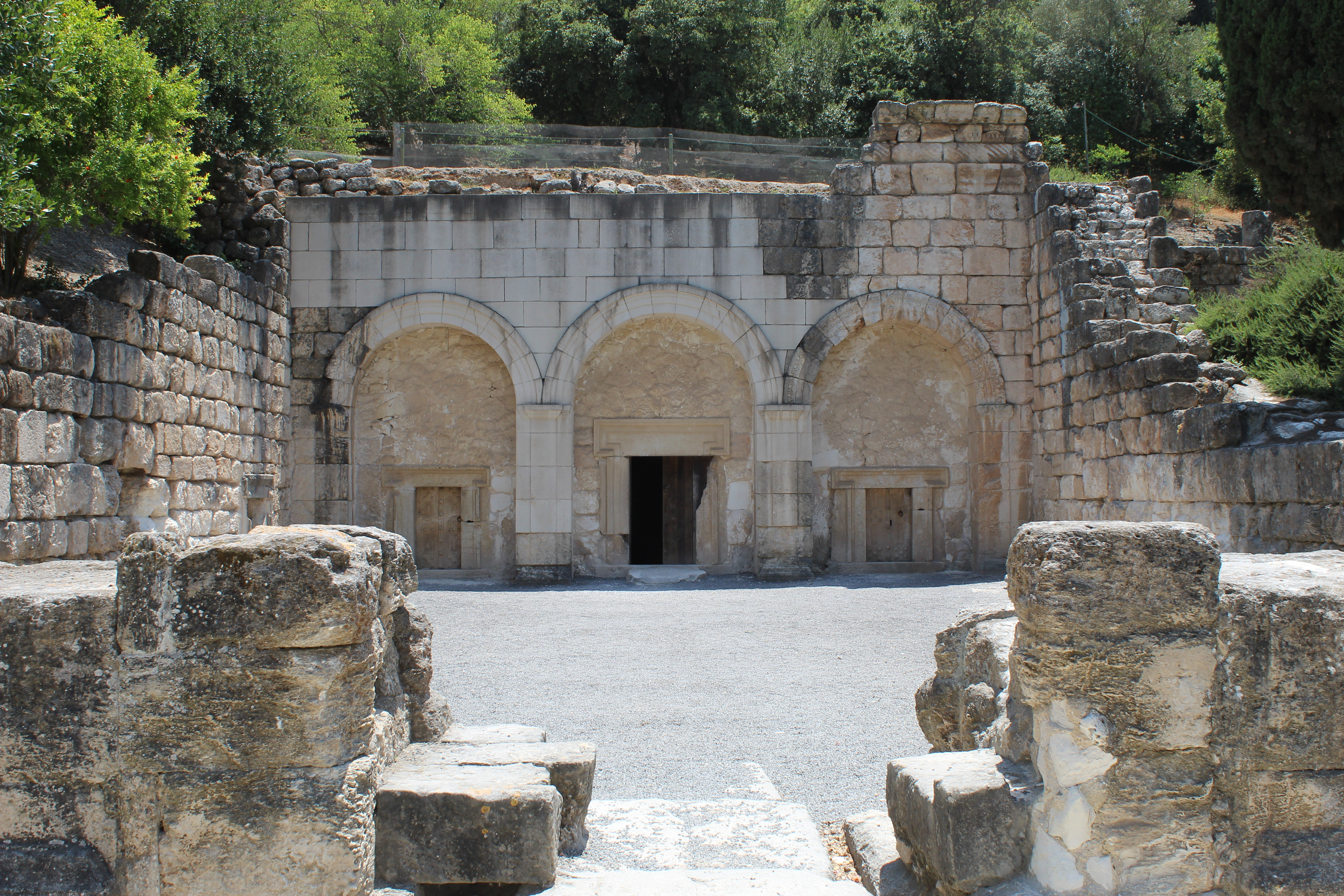
- Facade of the "Cave of the Coffins"

- Location within Israel
- Location: Haifa District, Israel
- Nearest city: Haifa
- Coordinates: 32°42′8″N 35°7′37″E
- Governing body: Israel Nature and Parks Authority

UNESCO World Heritage Site
- Official name: Necropolis of Beit She'arim: A Landmark of Jewish Renewal
- Type: Cultural
- Criteria: ii, iii
- Designated: 2015 (39th session)
- Reference no.: 1471
- Region: Europe and North America

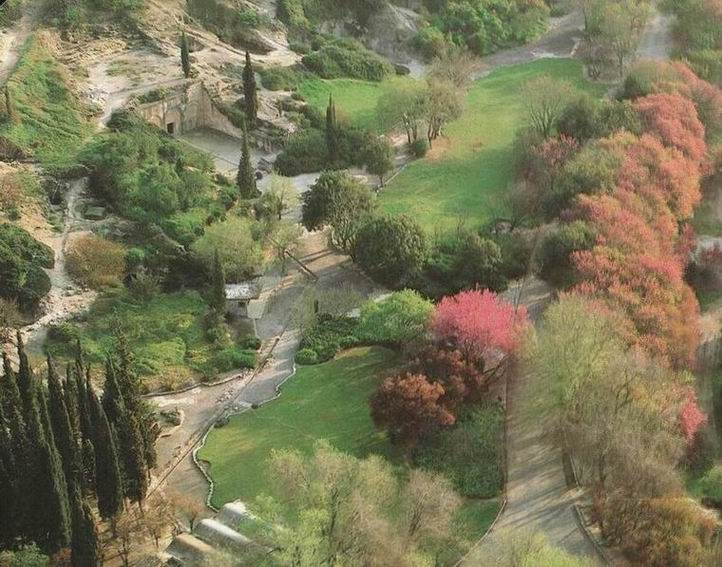
Beit She'arim National Park

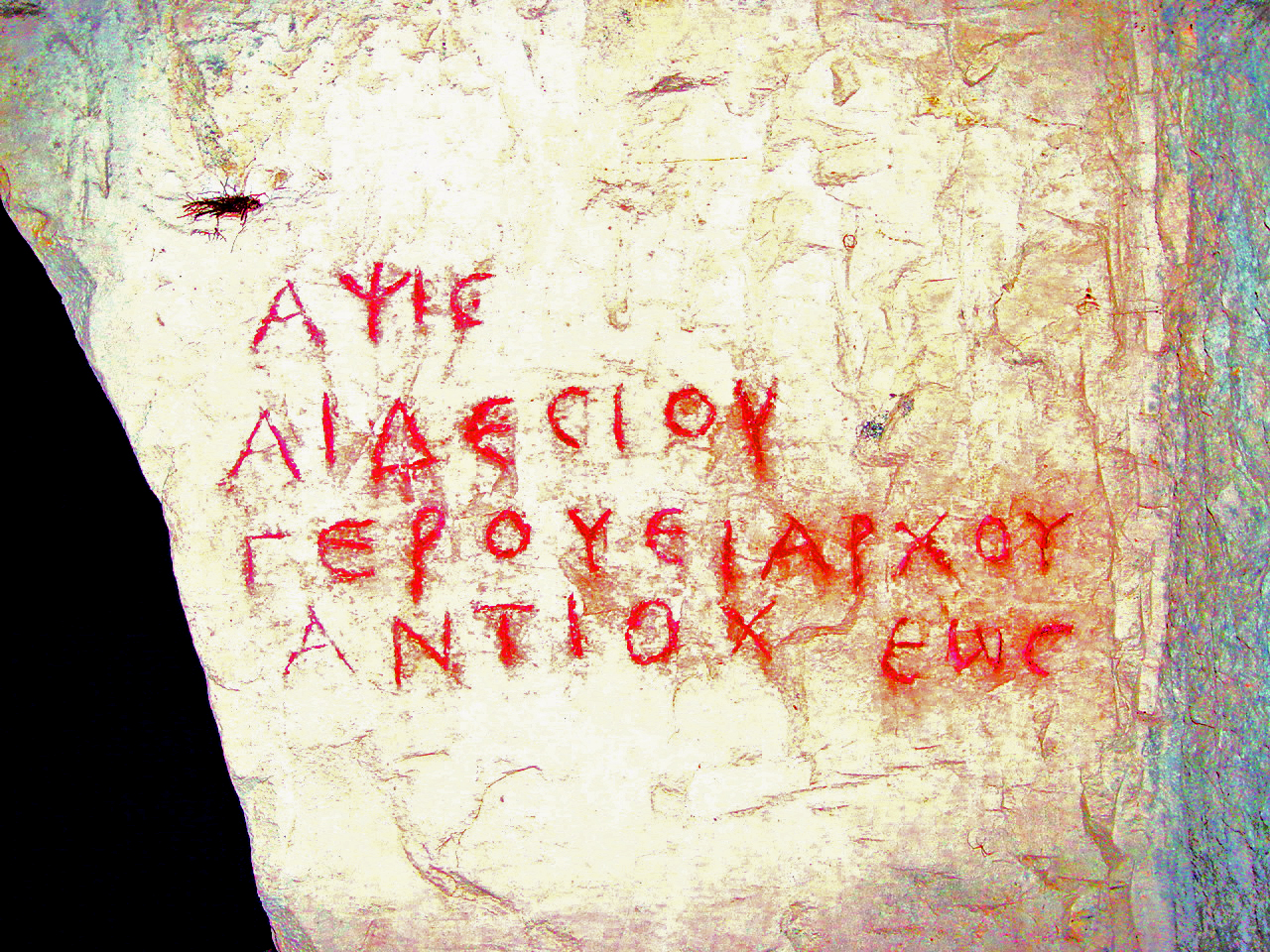
Wall inscription (epitaph) in Greek: "The tomb of Aidesios, head of the council of elders, from Antiochia"

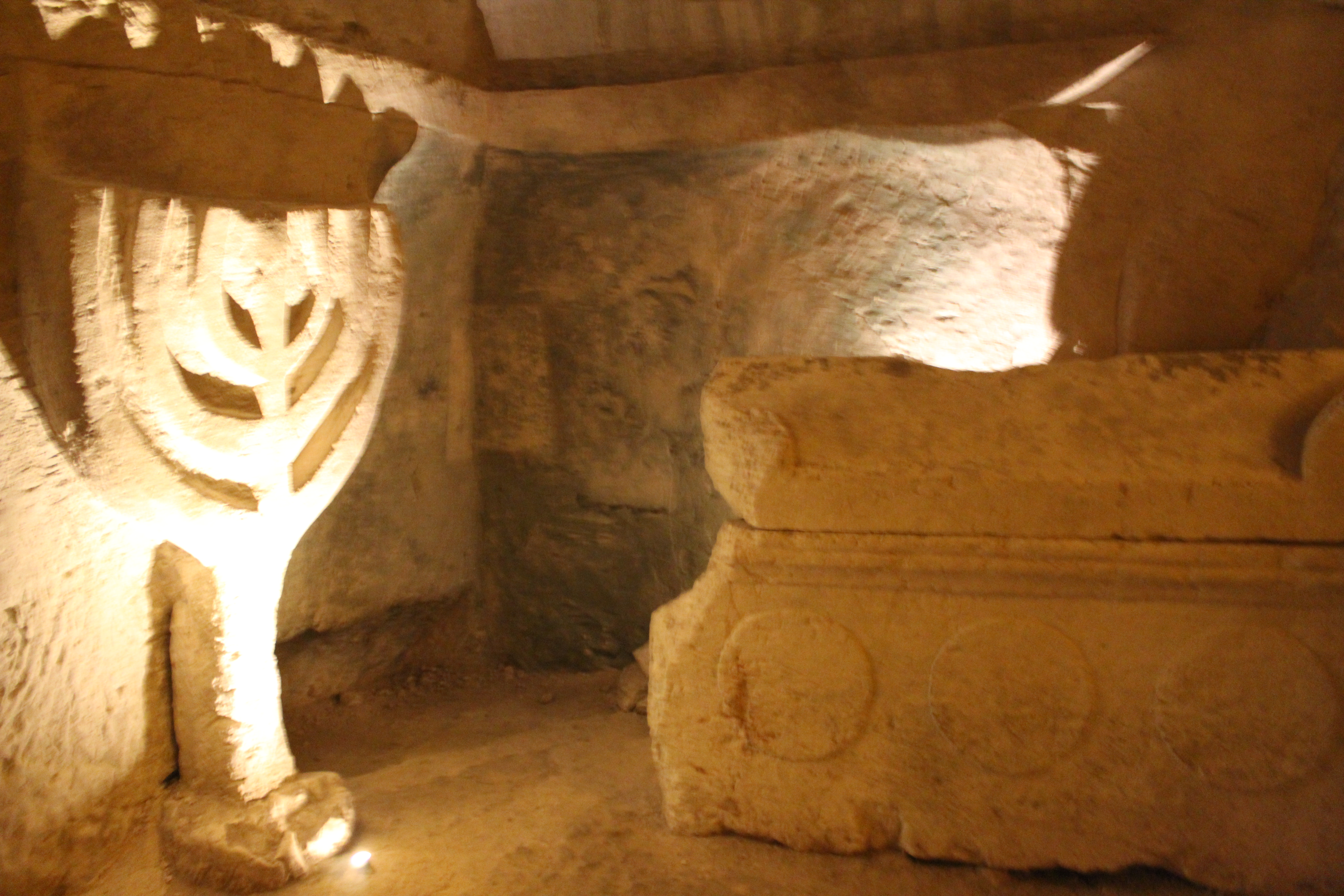
Menorah and sarcophagus in "Cave of the Coffins", Catacomb no. 20

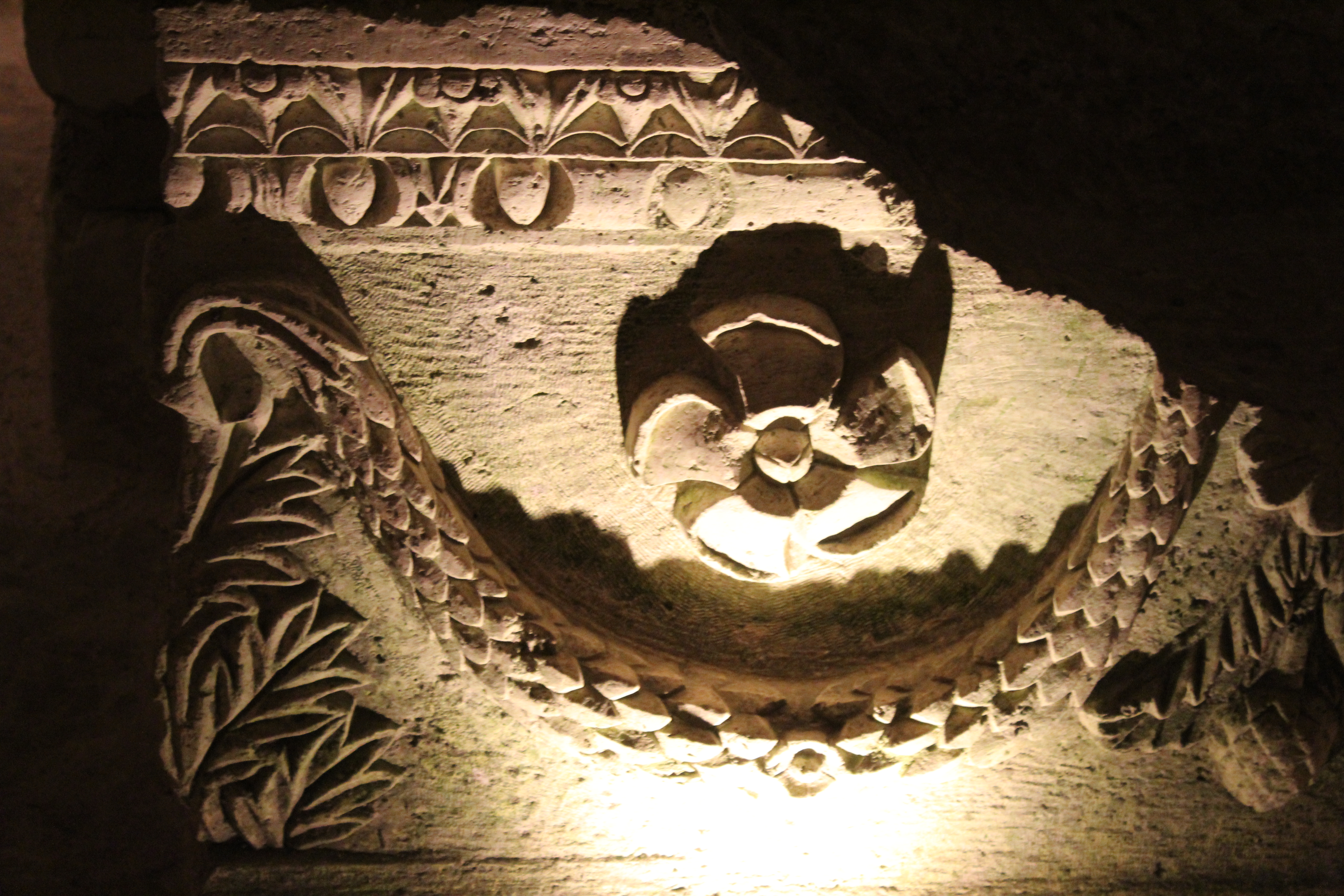
Decorated sarcophagus in "Cave of the Coffins", Catacomb no. 20

Beit She'arim Necropolis (Hebrew: בֵּית שְׁעָרִים, "House of Gates") is an extensive rock-cut necropolis located near the ancient Jewish town of Beit She'arim, 20 km east of Haifa in the southern foothills of the Lower Galilee. Part of Beit She'arim National Park, the site includes the necropolis and remains of the town. Used from the first to fourth centuries CE, its peak occurred in the late second century when the Sanhedrin, led by Judah ha-Nasi, relocated to Beit She'arim, and his family was interred there. In 2015, the necropolis was designated a UNESCO World Heritage Site.

The necropolis is carved out of soft limestone and contains more than 30 burial cave systems. When 20th-century archaeologists first explored the catacombs, the tombs had already fallen into great disrepair and neglect, and the sarcophagi contained therein had almost all been broken into by grave robbers in search of treasure. This pillaging was believed to have happened in the 8th and 9th centuries based on the type of terracotta oil lamps found in situ. The robbers also emptied the stone coffins of the bones of the deceased. During the Mamluk Sultanate (13–15th centuries), the "Cave of the Coffins" (Catacomb no. 20) served as a place of refuge for Arab shepherds.

Claude Reignier Conder of the Palestine Exploration Fund visited the site in late 1872 and described one of the systems of caves, known as "The Cave of Hell" (Mughārat al-Jahannum). While exploring a catacomb, he found there a coin of Agrippa, which find led him to conclude that the ruins date back to "the later Jewish times, about the Christian era". Benjamin Mazar, during his excavations of Sheikh Abreik, discovered coins that date no later than the time of Constantine the Great and Constantius II.

Although only a portion of the necropolis has been excavated, it has been likened to a book inscribed in stone. Its catacombs, mausoleums, and sarcophagi are adorned with elaborate symbols and figures as well as an impressive quantity of incised and painted inscriptions in Mishnaic Hebrew, Ancient Hebrew Aramaic (Language Spoken by Jews during the 1st Temple and 2nd Temple periods), Palmyrene Aramaic, and Koine Greek, documenting two centuries of historical and cultural achievement. The wealth of artistic adornments in this, the most ancient extensive Jewish cemetery in the world, is unparalleled anywhere.

== Name ==
According to Moshe Sharon, following Yechezkel Kutscher, the name of the city was Beit She'arayim or Kfar She'arayim (the House/Village of Two Gates). The ancient Yemenite Jewish pronunciation of the name is also "Bet She'arayim", which is more closely related to the Ancient Greek rendition of the name, i.e. Βησάρα, "Besara".

The popular orthography for the Hebrew word for house, בֵּית, is "beit". The King James Version has "beth", the effort being now to replace both with "bet".

== History of the settlement ==
The national park is managed by the National Parks Authority. It borders the town of Kiryat Tiv'on on the northeast and is located five kilometres west of the moshav named after the historical location in 1926, a decade prior to its archaeological identification. In early modern times the site was the Arab village of Sheikh Bureik; it was depopulated in the 1920s as a result of the Sursock Purchases, and identified as Beit She'arim in 1936 by historical geographer Samuel Klein.

=== Iron Age ===
Pottery shards discovered at the site indicate that a first settlement there dates back to the Iron Age.

=== Second Temple period ===
Beit She'arayim was founded at the end of the 1st century BCE, during the reign of King Herod. The Roman Jewish historian Josephus, in The Life of Flavius Josephus, referred to the city in Greek as Besara, the administrative center of the estates of Queen regnant of Cyrenaica Berenice II in the Jezreel Valley.

=== Roman and Byzantine periods ===
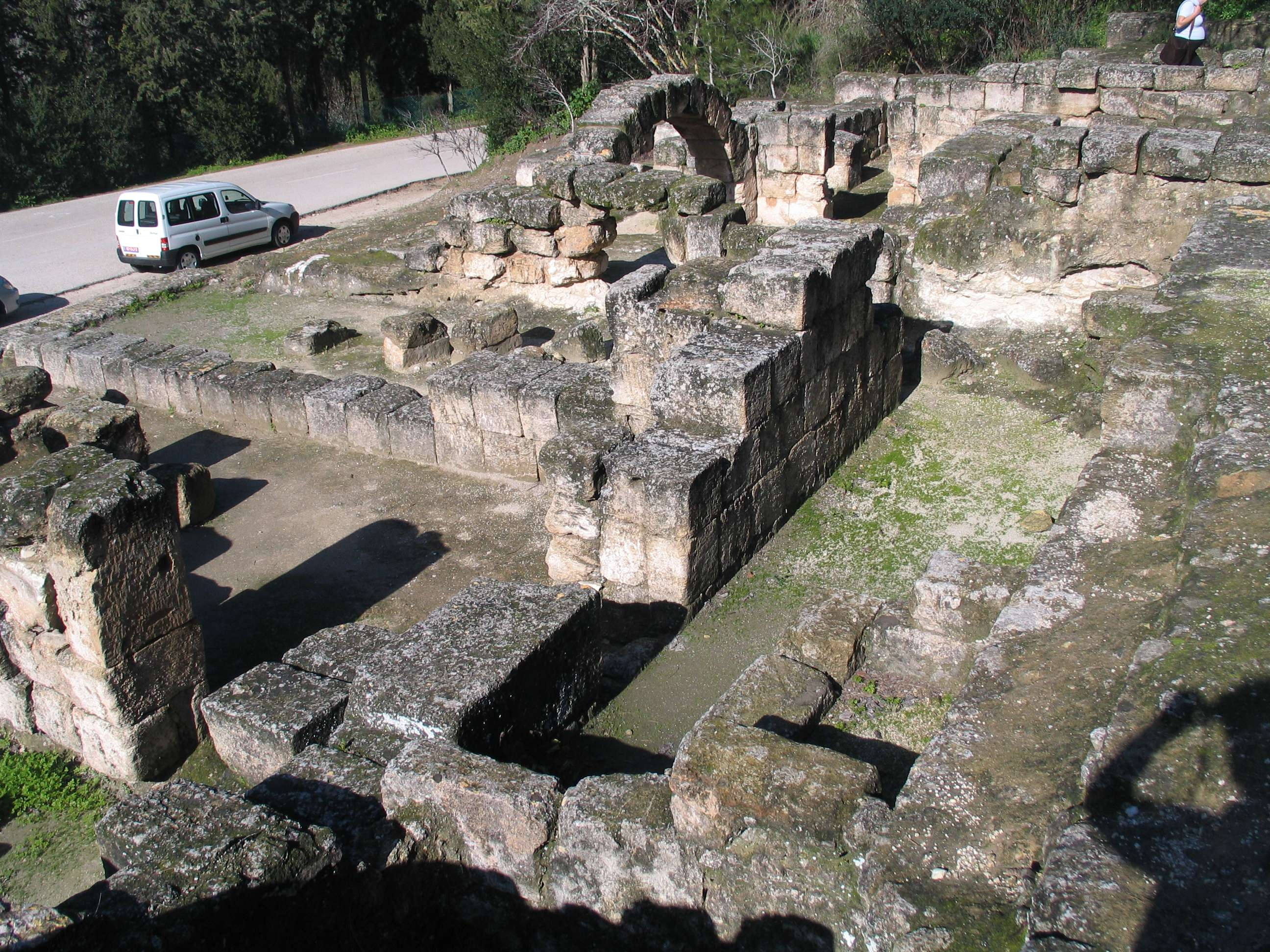
The synagogue

After the destruction of the Second Temple in 70 CE, the Sanhedrin (Jewish legislature and supreme council) migrated from place to place, first going into Jabneh, then into Usha, from there into Shefar'am, and thence into Beit She'arayim. The town is mentioned in rabbinical literature as an important center of Jewish learning during the 2nd century. Rabbi Judah ha-Nasi, head of the Sanhedrin and compiler of the Mishnah, lived there. In the last seventeen years of his life, he moved to Sepphoris for health reasons, but planned his burial in Beit She'arim. According to tradition, in Beit She’arim he owned land he received as a gift from his friend, the Roman emperor Marcus Aurelius Antoninus. The most desired burial place for Jews was the Mount of Olives in Jerusalem, but in 135 CE, when Jews were barred from the area, Beit She'arim became an alternative. The fact that Rabbi Judah was interred there led many other Jews from all over the country and from the Jewish diaspora, from nearby Phoenicia to far-away Himyar in Yemen, to be buried next to his grave.

Almost 300 inscriptions primarily in Greek, but also in Hebrew, Aramaic, and Palmyrene were found on the walls of the catacombs containing numerous sarcophagi.

=== Early Islamic period ===
From the beginning of the Early Islamic period (7th century), settlement was sparse. Excavations uncovered 75 lamps dating to the period of Umayyad (7th-8th centuries) and Abbasid (8th–13th centuries) rule over Palestine. A large Abbasid-period glassmaking facility from the 9th century was also found at the site (see below).

=== Crusader period ===
There is some evidence of activity in the nearby village area and necropolis dating to the Crusader period (12th century), probably connected to travellers and temporary settlement.

=== Ottoman period ===
A small Arab village called Sheikh Bureik was located above the necropolis at least from the late 16th century. A map by Pierre Jacotin from Napoleon's invasion of 1799 showed the place, named as Cheik Abrit.

=== British Mandate ===
The October 1922 census of Palestine recorded Sheikh Abreik with a population of 111 Muslims. At some time during the early 1920s, the Sursuk family sold the lands of the village, including the necropolis, to the Jewish National Fund, via Yehoshua Hankin, a Zionist activist who was responsible for most of the major land purchases of the World Zionist Organization in Ottoman Palestine. After the sale, which included lands from the Arab villages of Harithiya, Sheikh Abreik and Harbaj, a total of 59 Arab tenants were evicted from the three villages, with 3,314 pounds compensation paid. In 1925 an agricultural settlement was established on the ruins of Sheikh Abreik by the Hapoel HaMizrachi, a Zionist political party and settlement movement, but who later abandoned the site for a newer settlement in Sde Ya'akov.

== Archaeology ==
=== History of archaeological research ===
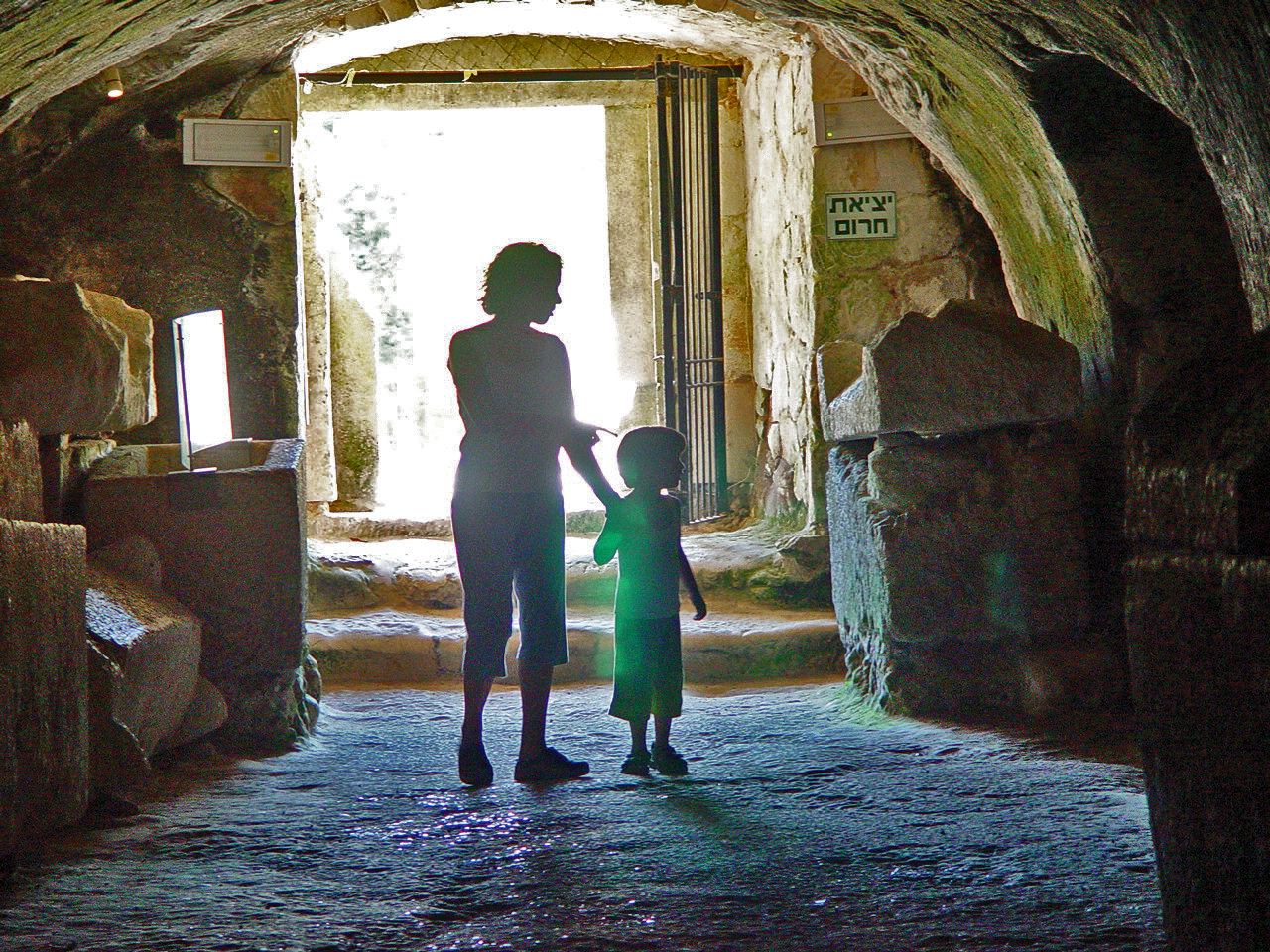
Visitors at the Cave of the Coffins

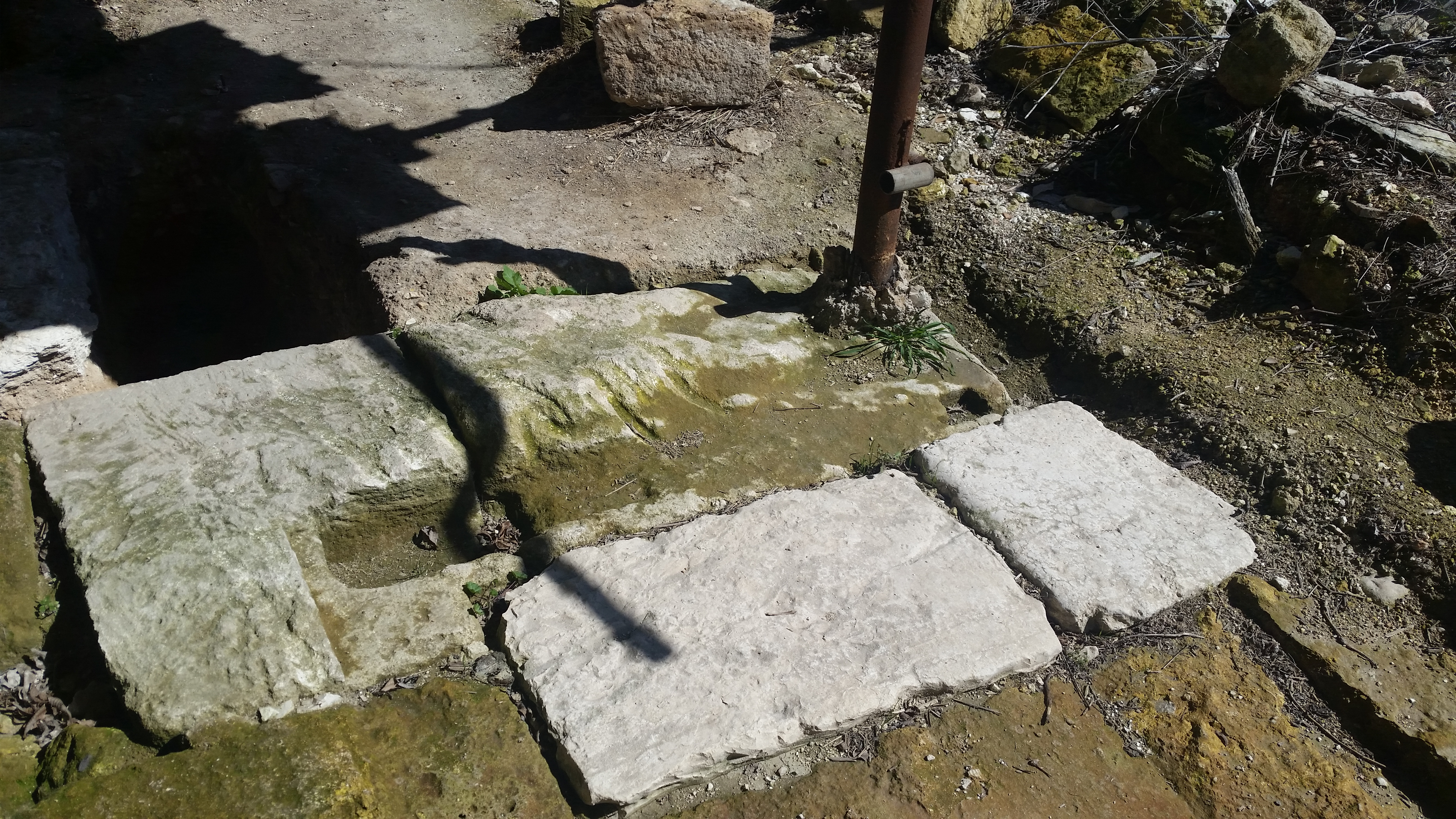
Broken stone door at entrance to one of the caves

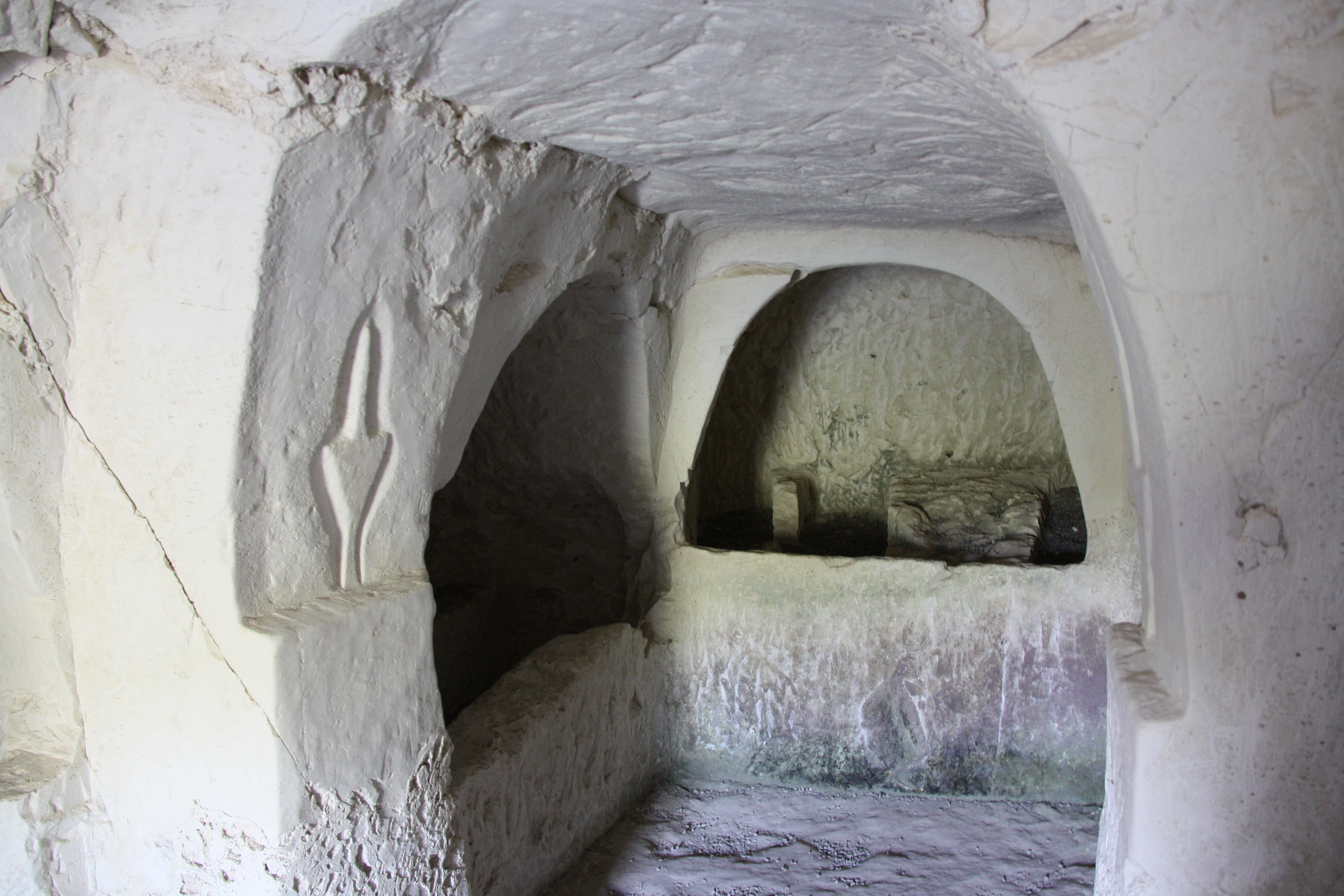
"Cave of the Lulavim"

The archaeological importance of the site was recognized in the 1880s by the Survey of Western Palestine, which explored many tombs and catacombs but did no excavation. In 1936, Alexander Zaïd, employed by the JNF as a watchman, reported that he had found a breach in the wall of one of the caves which led into another cave decorated with inscriptions. In the 1930s and 1950s, the site was excavated by Benjamin Mazar and Nahman Avigad. Excavations resumed in 2014.

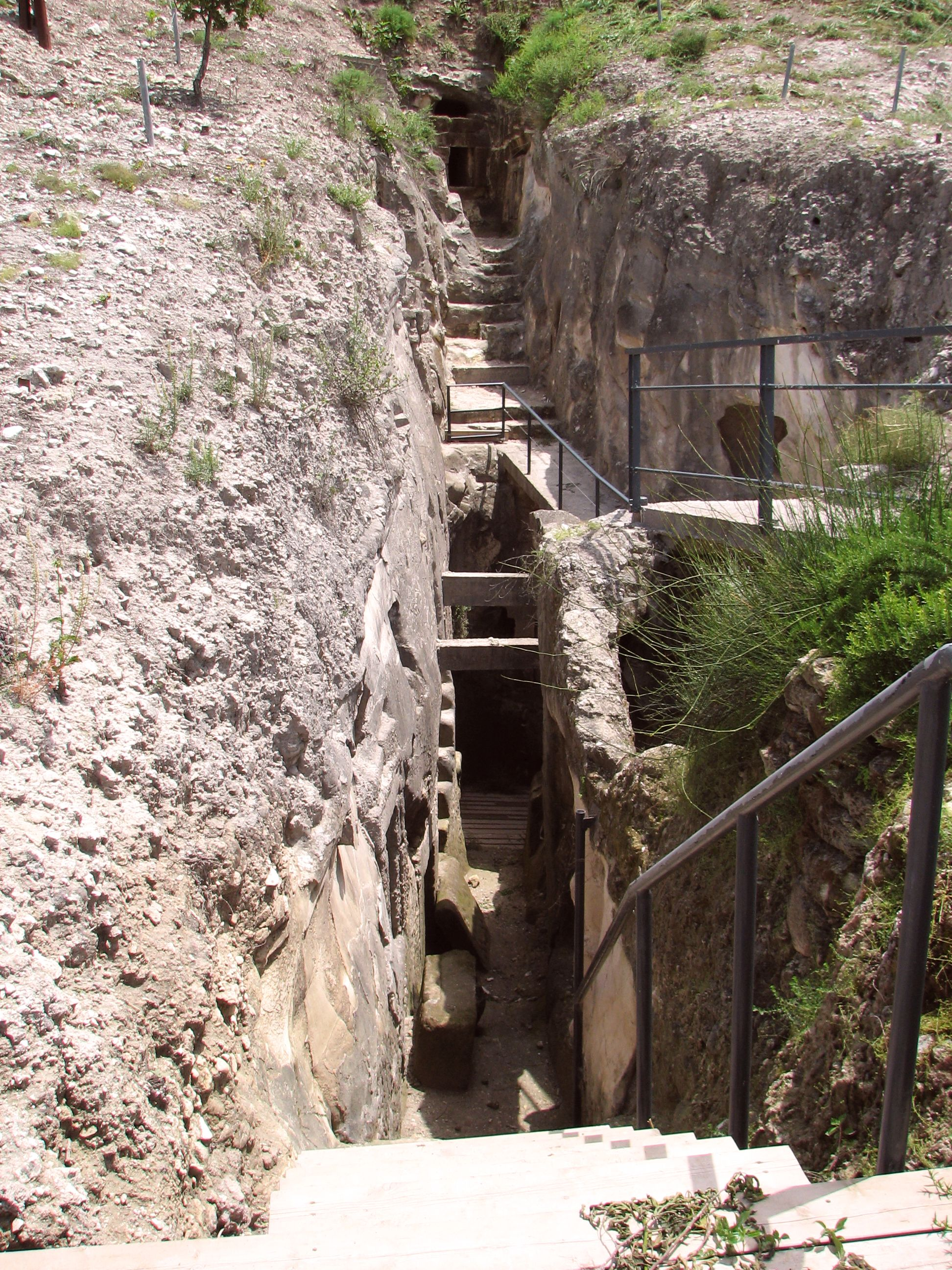
Beit She'arim – Cave of the Horseman

Since 2014, the excavations at the site have been conducted by Adi Erlich, on behalf of the University of Haifa's Institute of Archaeology, and are ongoing as of 2021. Erlich is focusing her excavation on the actual ancient town, which occupied the hilltop above the well-studied necropolis, and of which only a few buildings had been previously discovered.

=== Main findings ===
==== Jewish necropolis ====
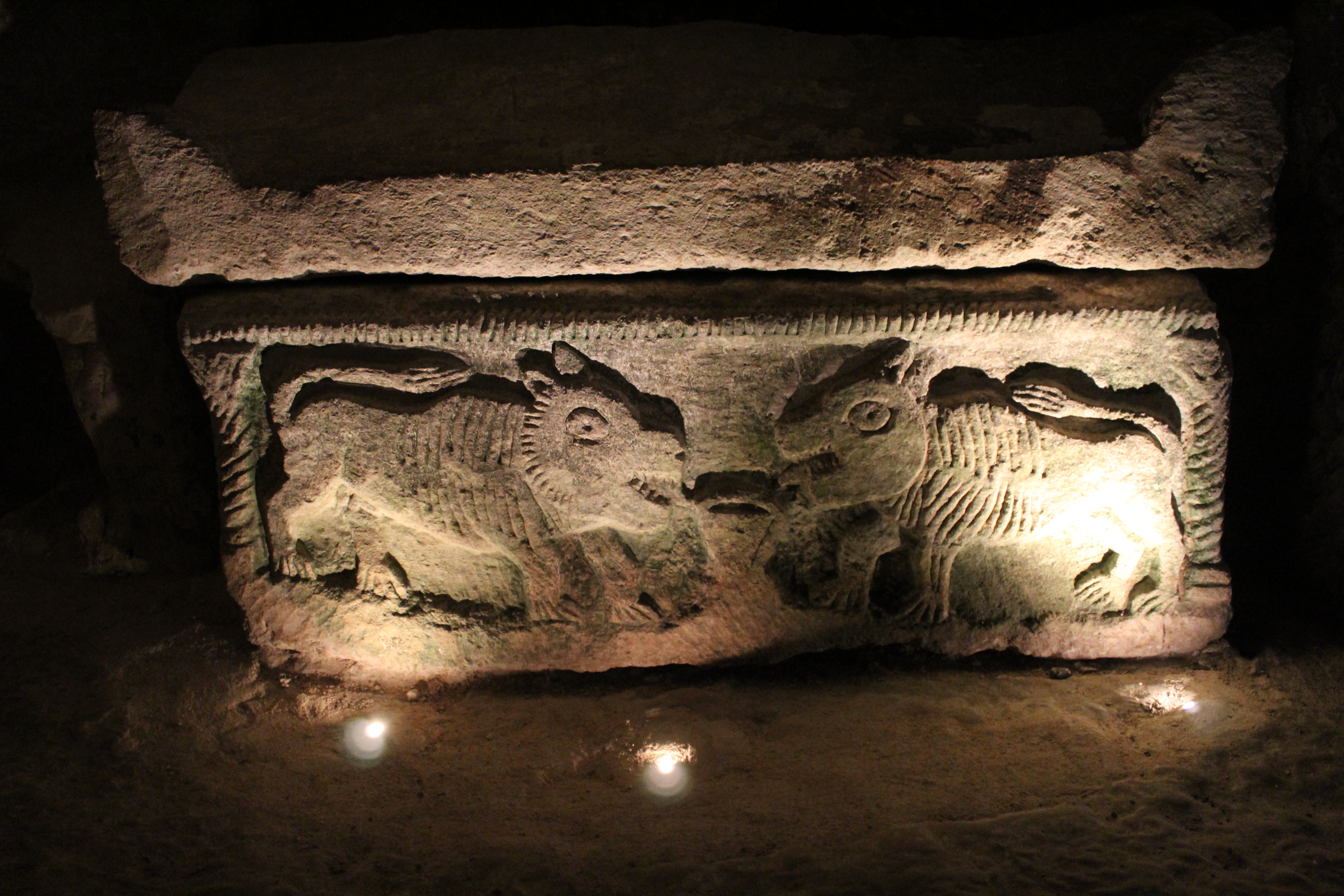
Two lions facing each other, a Greek mythological scene decorating a sarcophagus in the Cave of the Coffins

A total of 21 catacombs have so far been discovered in the Beit She'arim necropolis, almost all containing a main hall with recesses in the wall (loculi) and sarcophagi that once contained the remains of the dead. These have since been removed, either by grave-robbers, or by Atra Kadisha, the governmental body responsible for the reburial of exhumed bones at archaeological sites. Most of the remains date from the 2nd to 4th century CE. Close to 300 sepulchral inscriptions have been discovered at the necropolis, most of which engraved in Greek uncials, and a few in Hebrew and Aramaic. Geographical references in these inscriptions reveal that the necropolis was used by people from the town of Beit She'arim, from elsewhere in Galilee, and even from further afield in the region, like Palmyra (in Syria) and Tyre. Others came from Antioch (in Turkey), Mesene (South Mesopotamia, today in Iraq), the Phoenician coast (Sidon, Beirut, Byblos, all in today's Lebanon), and even Himyar (in Yemen), among other places.

Aside from an extensive body of inscriptions in several languages, the walls and tombs have many images, engraved and carved in relief, ranging from Jewish symbols and geometric decoration to animals and figures from Hellenistic myth and religion. Many of the epigrams written on behalf of the deceased show a strong Hellenistic cultural influence, as many of them are taken directly from Homer's poems. In one of the caves was discovered a marble slab measuring 21 × 24 × 2 cm. with the Greek inscription: Μημοριον Λέο νπου πατρος του ριββι παρηγοριου και Ιουλιανου παλατινουα ποχρυσοχων [Translation: "In memory of Leo, father of the comforting rabbi and Julian, the palatine goldsmiths"]. Access to many of the catacombs was obtained by passing through stone doors that once turned on their axis, and in some cases still do.

In October 2009, two new caves were opened to the public whose burial vaults date to the first two centuries CE. Catacomb no. 20 and no. 14 are regularly open to the public, but most catacombs remain closed to the public, with a few being opened on weekends upon special request and prior appointment.

===== Cave of Yehuda HaNasi (Judah the Prince) =====
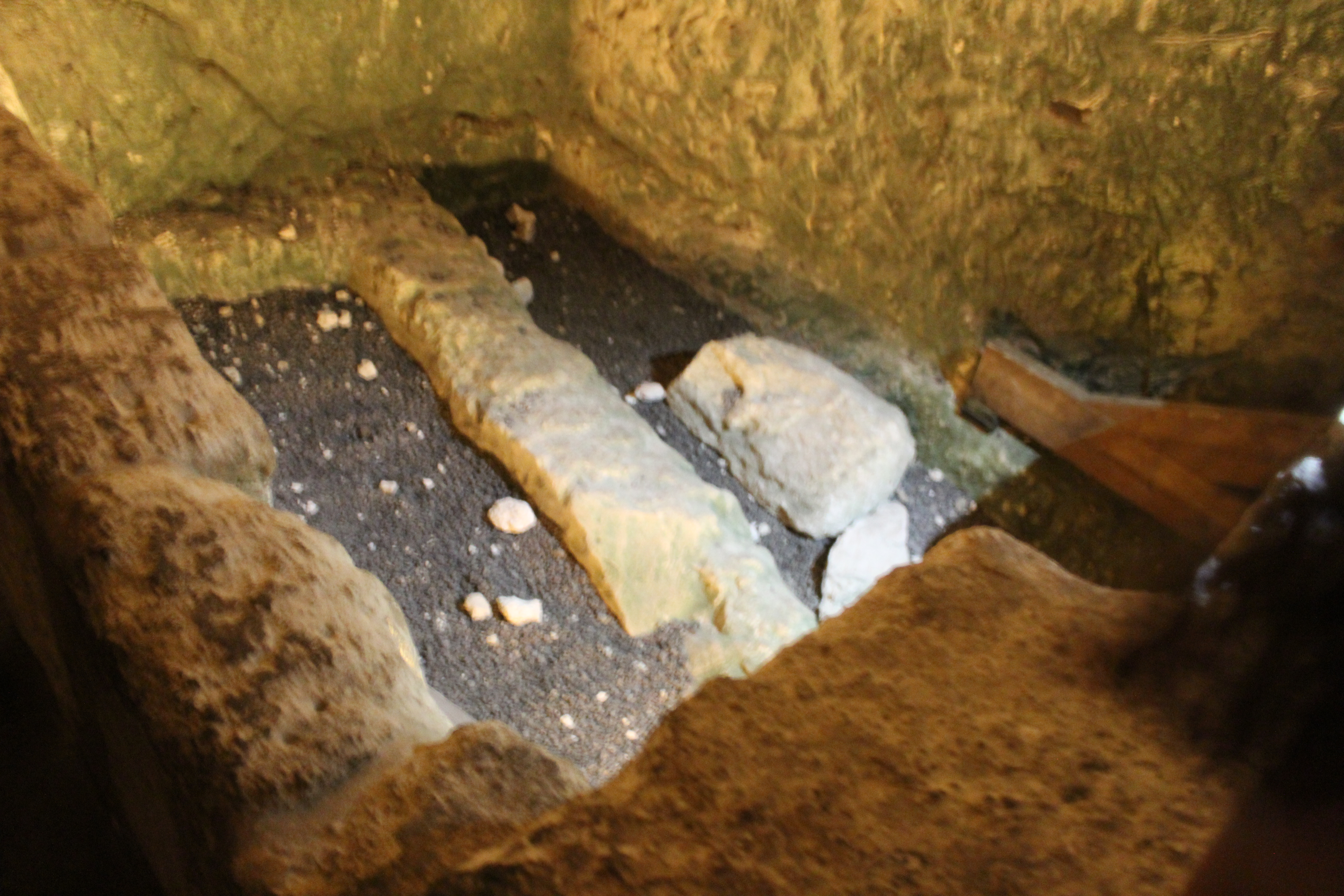
Rock-cut graves in Catacomb no. 14, thought to belong to Rabbi Yehuda HaNasi

The Jerusalem Talmud and Babylonian Talmud cite Beit She'arim as the burial place of Rabbi Judah the Prince (Hebrew: Yehuda HaNasi). His funeral is described as follows: "Miracles were wrought on that day. It was evening and all the towns gathered to mourn him, and eighteen synagogues praised him and bore him to Bet Shearim, and the daylight remained until everyone reached his home (Ketubot 12, 35a)." The fact that Rabbi Judah was buried here is believed to be a major reason for the popularity of the necropolis in late antiquity. Catacomb no. 14 is likely to have belonged to the family of Rabbi Judah the Prince. Two tombs located next to each other within the catacomb are identified by bilingual Hebrew and Greek inscriptions as those of "R. Gamliel" and "R. Shimon", believed to refer to Judah's sons, the nasi Gamaliel III and the hakham Rabbi Shimon. Another inscription refers to the tomb of "Rabbi Anania", believed to be Judah's student Hanania bar Hama. According to the Talmud, Judah declared on his deathbed that "Simon [Shimon] my son shall be hakham [president of the Sanhedrin], Gamaliel my son patriarch, Hanania bar Hama shall preside over the great court".

===== Himyarite tombs =====
Tomb of Himyarite, in Greek uncials

In 1937, Benjamin Mazar revealed at Beit She'arim a system of tombs belonging to the Jews of Himyar (now Yemen) dating back to the 3rd century CE. The strength of ties between Yemenite Jewry and the Land of Israel can be learnt by the system of tombs at Beit She'arim dating back to the 3rd century. It is of great significance that Jews from Ḥimyar were being brought for interment in what was then considered a prestigious place, near the catacombs of the Sanhedrin. Those who had the financial means brought their dead to be buried in the Land of Israel, as it was considered an outstanding virtue for Jews not to be buried in foreign lands, but rather in the land of their forefathers. It is speculated that the Ḥimyarites, during their lifetime, were known and respected in the eyes of those who dwelt in the Land of Israel, seeing that one of them, whose name was Menaḥem, was coined the epithet qyl ḥmyr [prince of Ḥimyar], in the eight-character Ḥimyari ligature, while in the Greek inscription he was called Menae presbyteros (Menaḥem, the community's elder). The name of a woman written in Greek in its genitive form, Ενλογιαζ, is also engraved there, meaning either 'virtue', 'blessing', or 'gratis'; however, its precise transcription remains of scholarly dispute. The people of Himyar were buried in a single catacomb, in which 40 smaller rooms or loculi branched-off from a main hall.

==== Abbasid period ====
===== Glassmaking industry =====
In 1956, a bulldozer working at the site unearthed an enormous rectangular slab, 11 × 6.5 × 1.5 feet, weighing 9 tons. Initially, it was paved over, but it was eventually studied and found to be a gigantic piece of glass. A glassmaking furnace was located here in the 9th century during the Abbasid period, which produced great batches of molten glass that were cooled and later broken into small pieces for crafting glass vessels.

===== Poem inside catacomb =====
An elegy written in Arabic script typical of the 9–10th century and containing the date AH 287 or 289 (AD 900 or 902) was found in the Magharat al-Jahannam ("Cave of Hell") catacomb during excavations conducted there in 1956. The sophisticated and beautifully worded elegy was composed by the previously unknown poet Umm al-Qasim, whose name is given in acrostic in the poem, and it can be read in Moshe Sharon's book or here on Wikipedia.

Moshe Sharon speculates that this poem might be marking the beginning of the practice of treating this site as the sanctuary of Sheikh Abreik and suggests the site was used for burial at this time and possibly later as well. He further notes that the cave within which the inscription was found forms part of a vast area of ancient ruins which constituted a natural place for the emergence of a local shrine. Drawing on the work of Tawfiq Canaan, Sharon cites his observation that 32% of the sacred sites he visited in Palestine were located in the vicinity of ancient ruins.

== See also ==
- Rock-cut tombs in ancient Israel
- Sheikh Bureik
- Vigna Randanini

== Gallery ==
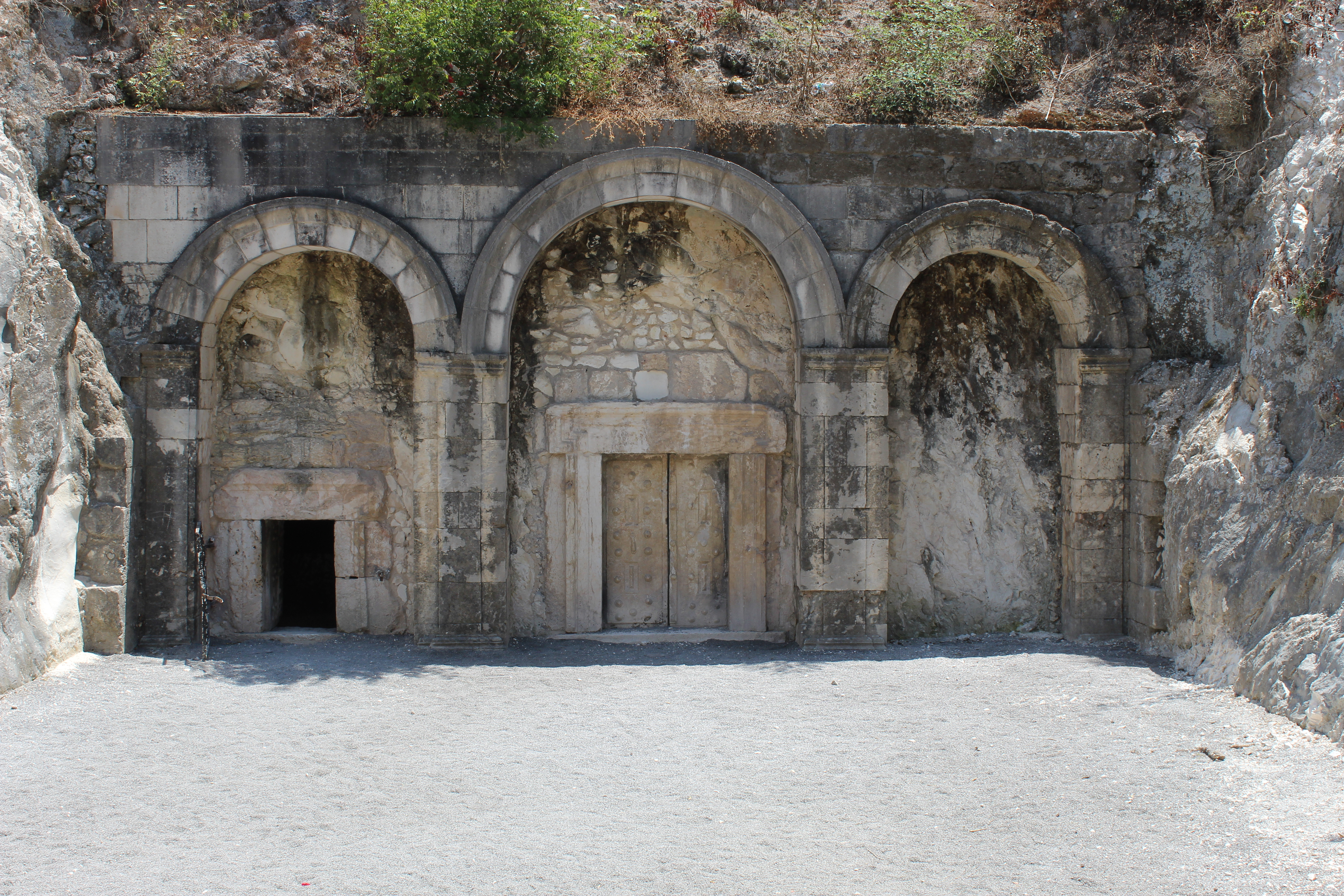
Facade of catacomb no. 14, "Cave of Rabbi Yehuda HaNasi"

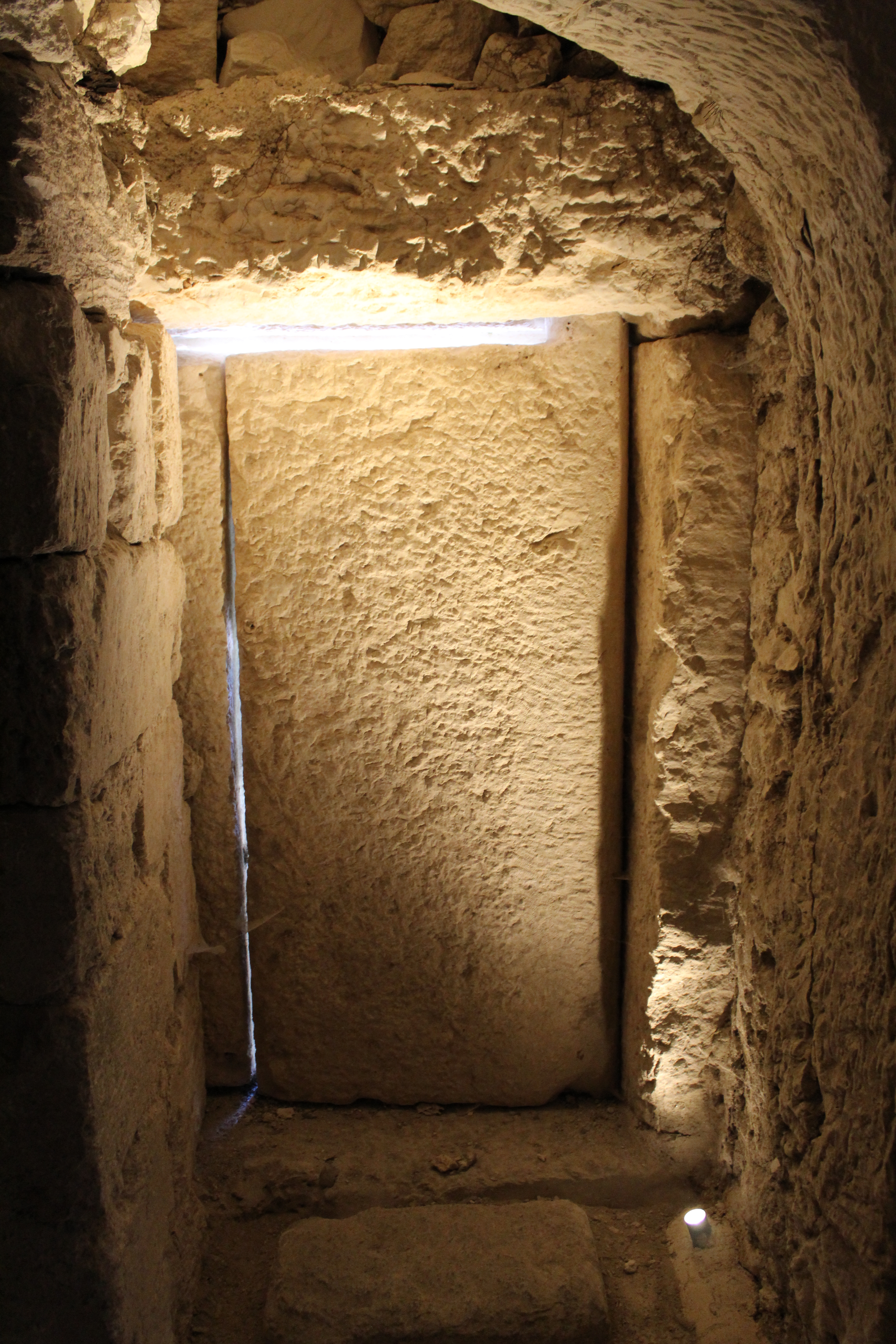
Catacomb no. 14 ("Cave of Rabbi Yehuda HaNasi"), entrance door from within

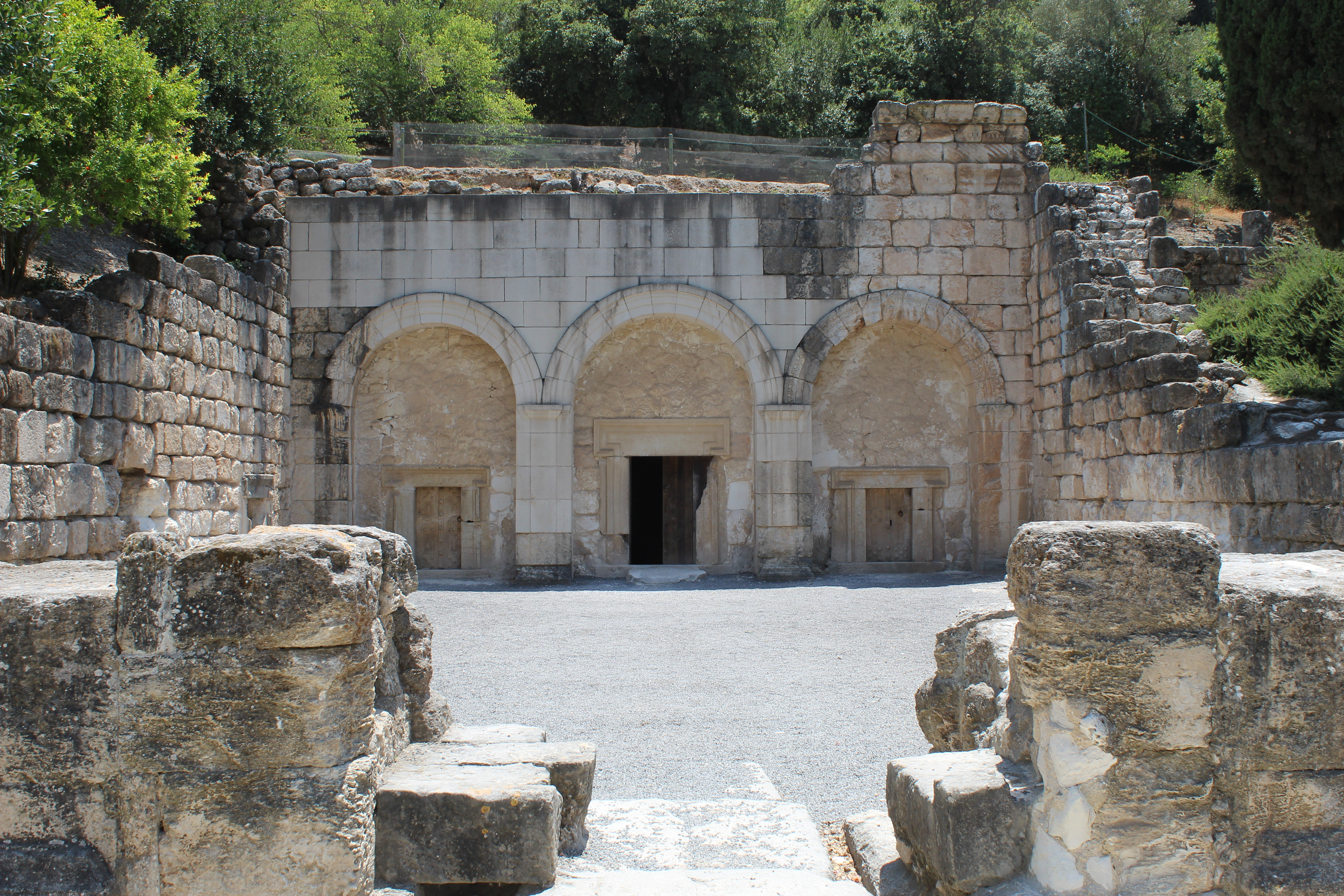
Facade of Catacomb no. 20, the "Cave of the Coffins"

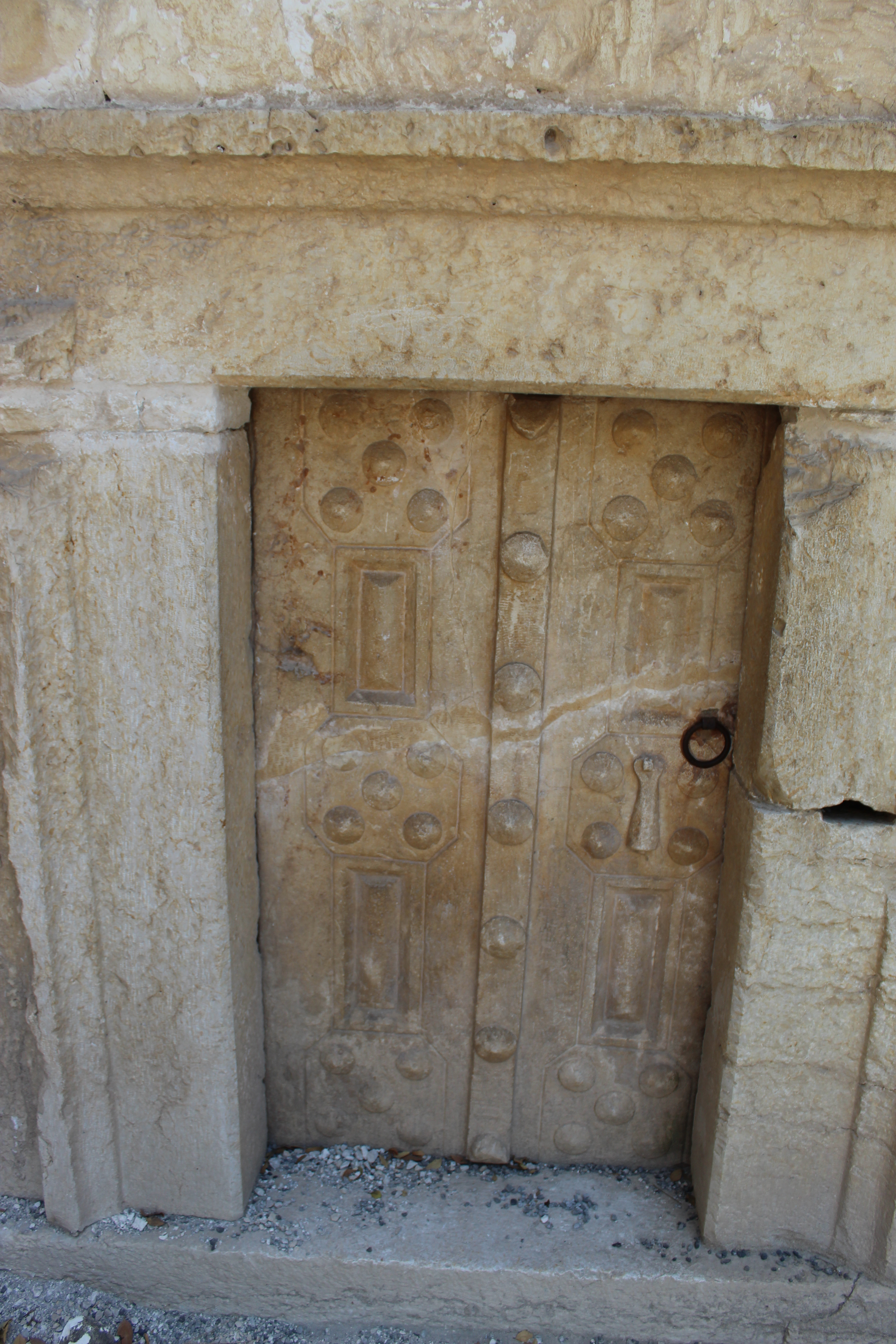
Stone door at entrance to Catacomb no. 20 imitating embossed wooden door

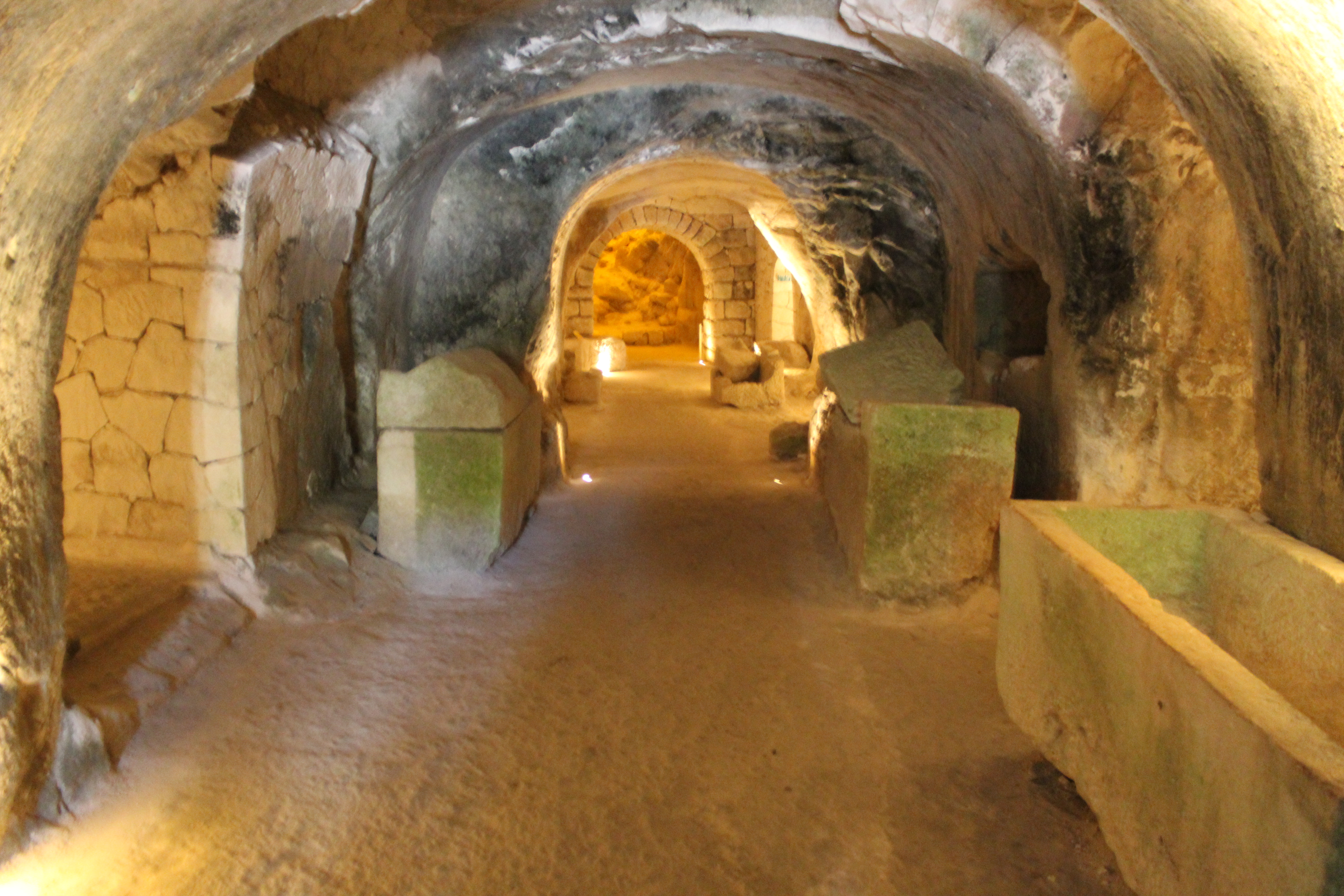
Corridor in Catacomb no. 20, "Cave of the Coffins"

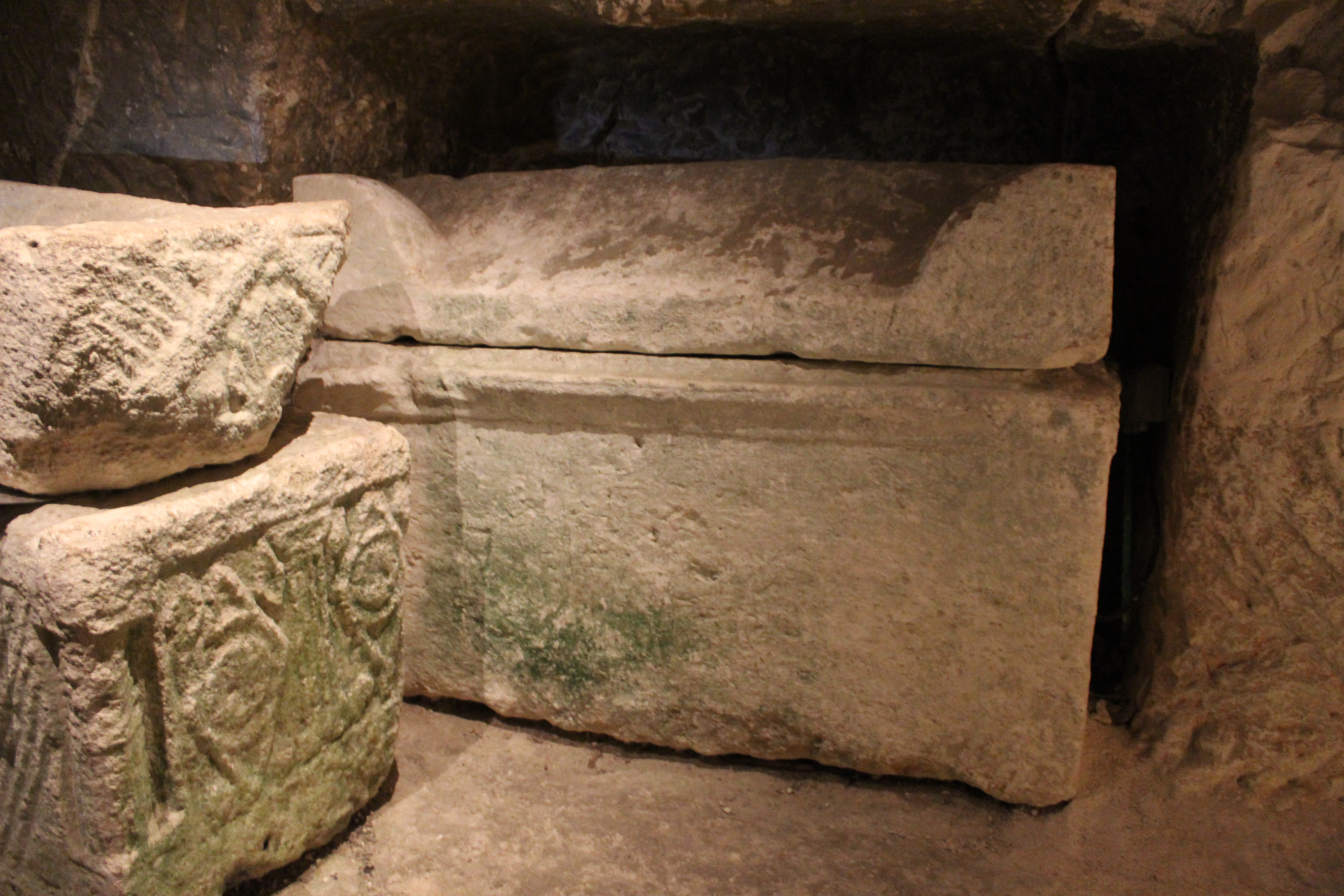
Sarcophagi in Catacomb no. 20

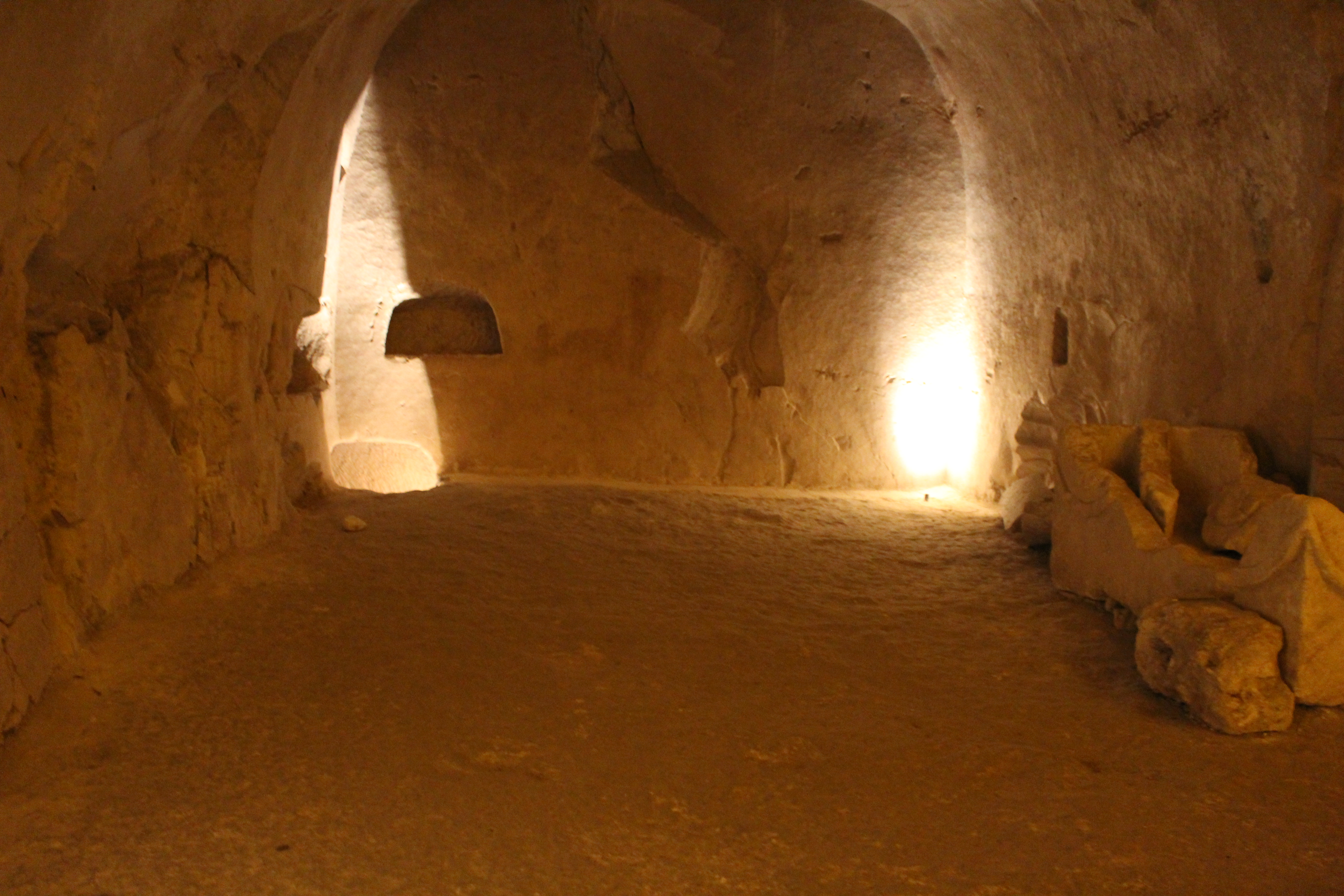
Chamber in Catacomb no. 20

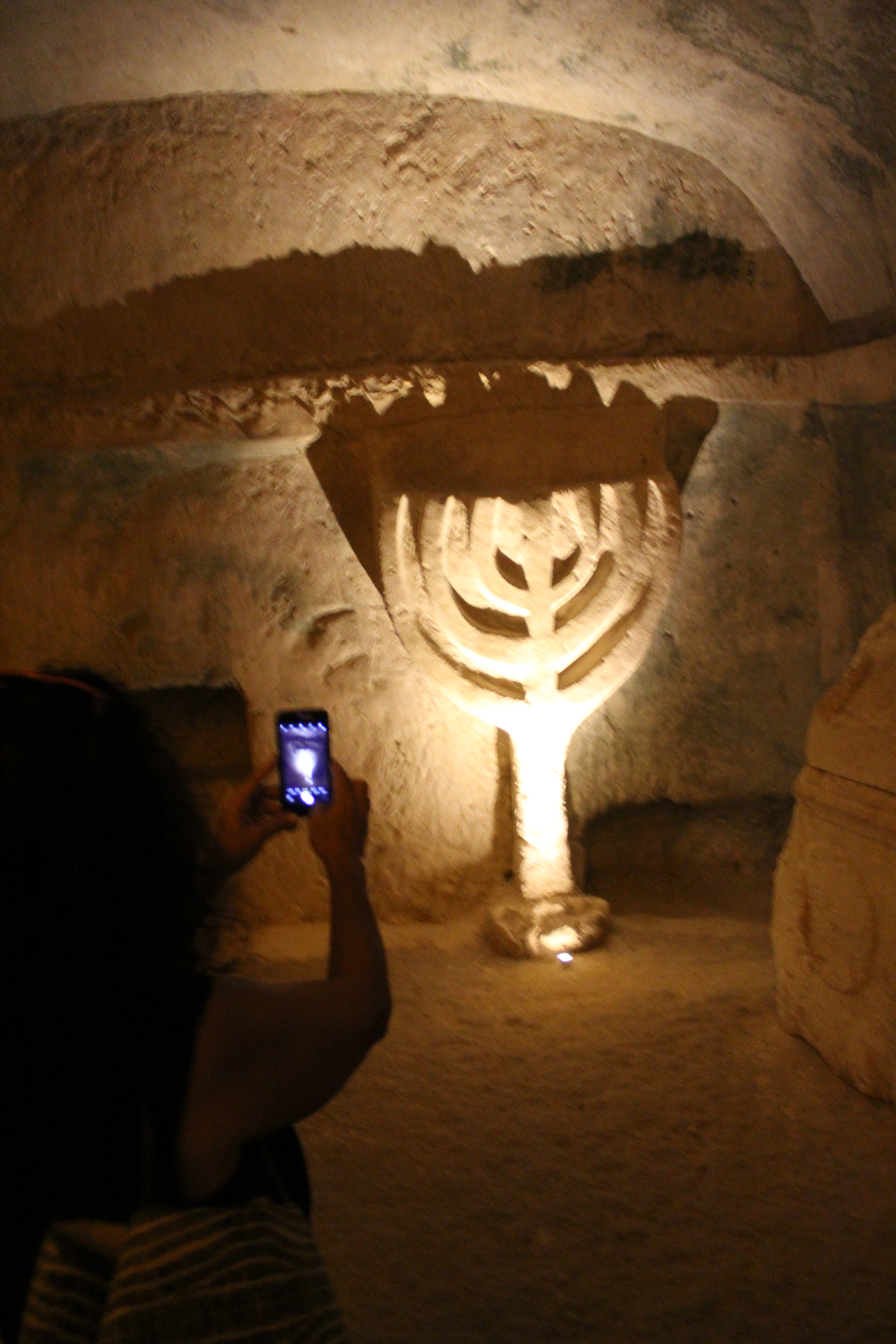
Menorah in Catacomb no. 20

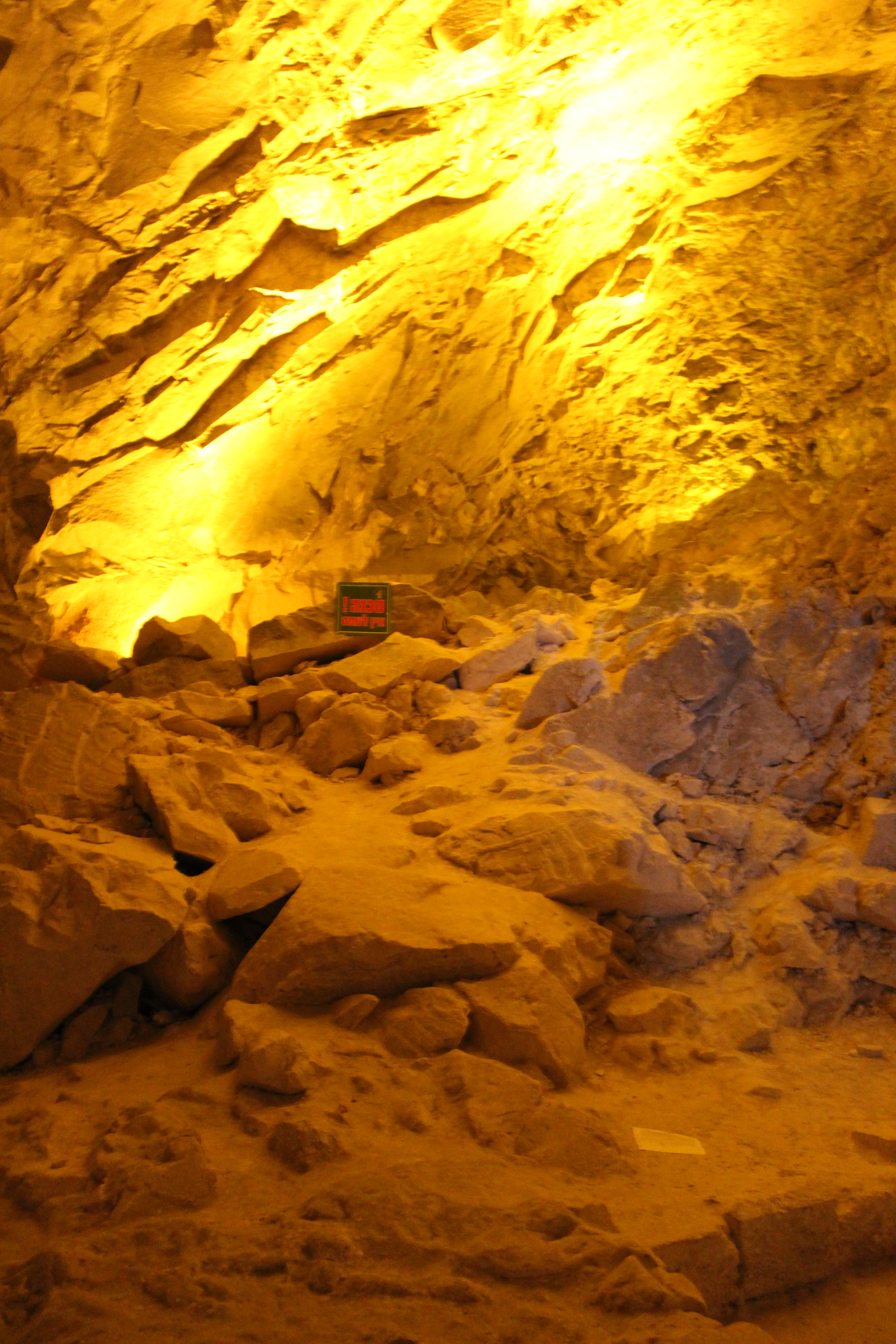
Catacomb no. 20

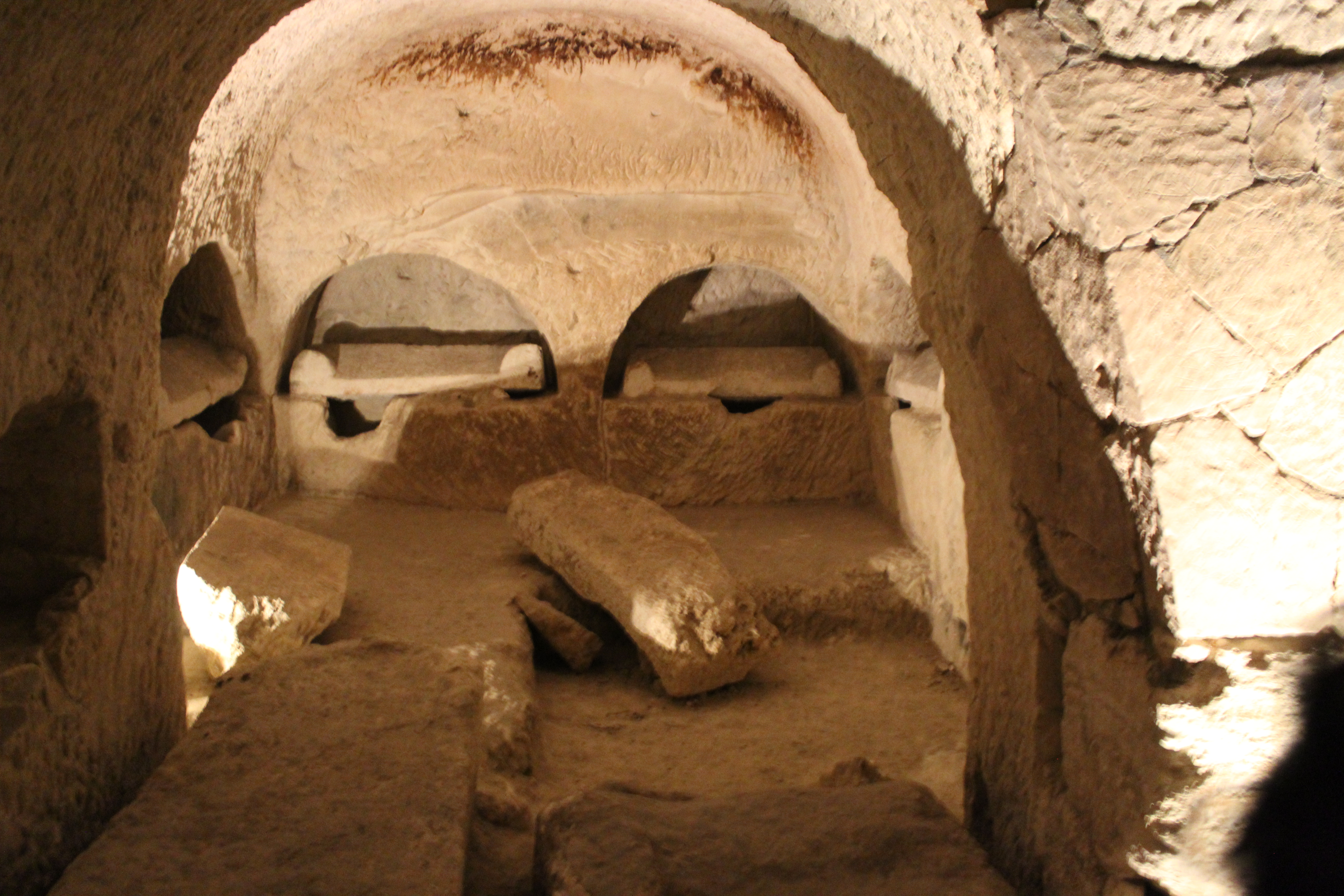
Chamber of burial niches

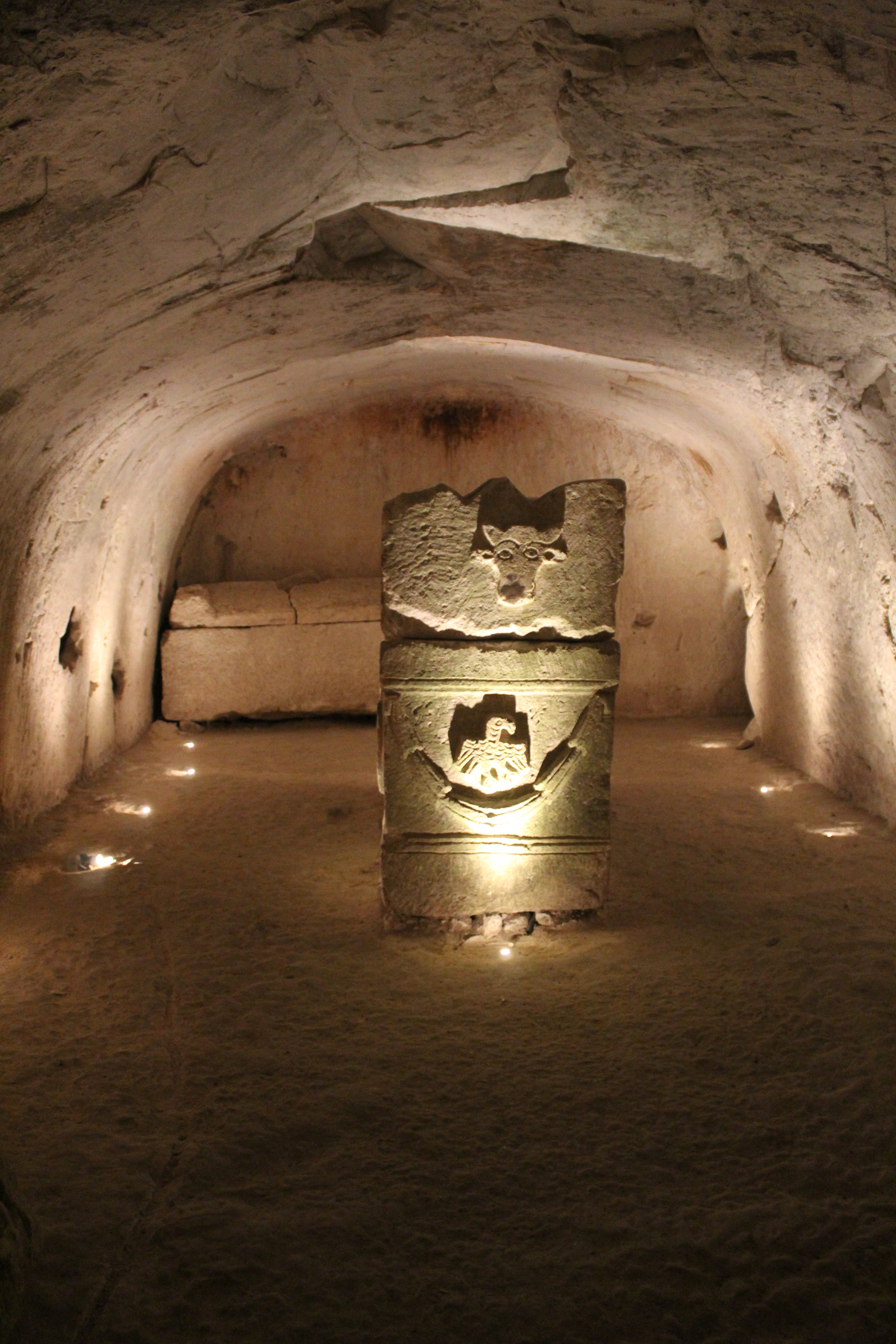
Chamber with decorated sarcophagus (bull and eagle)

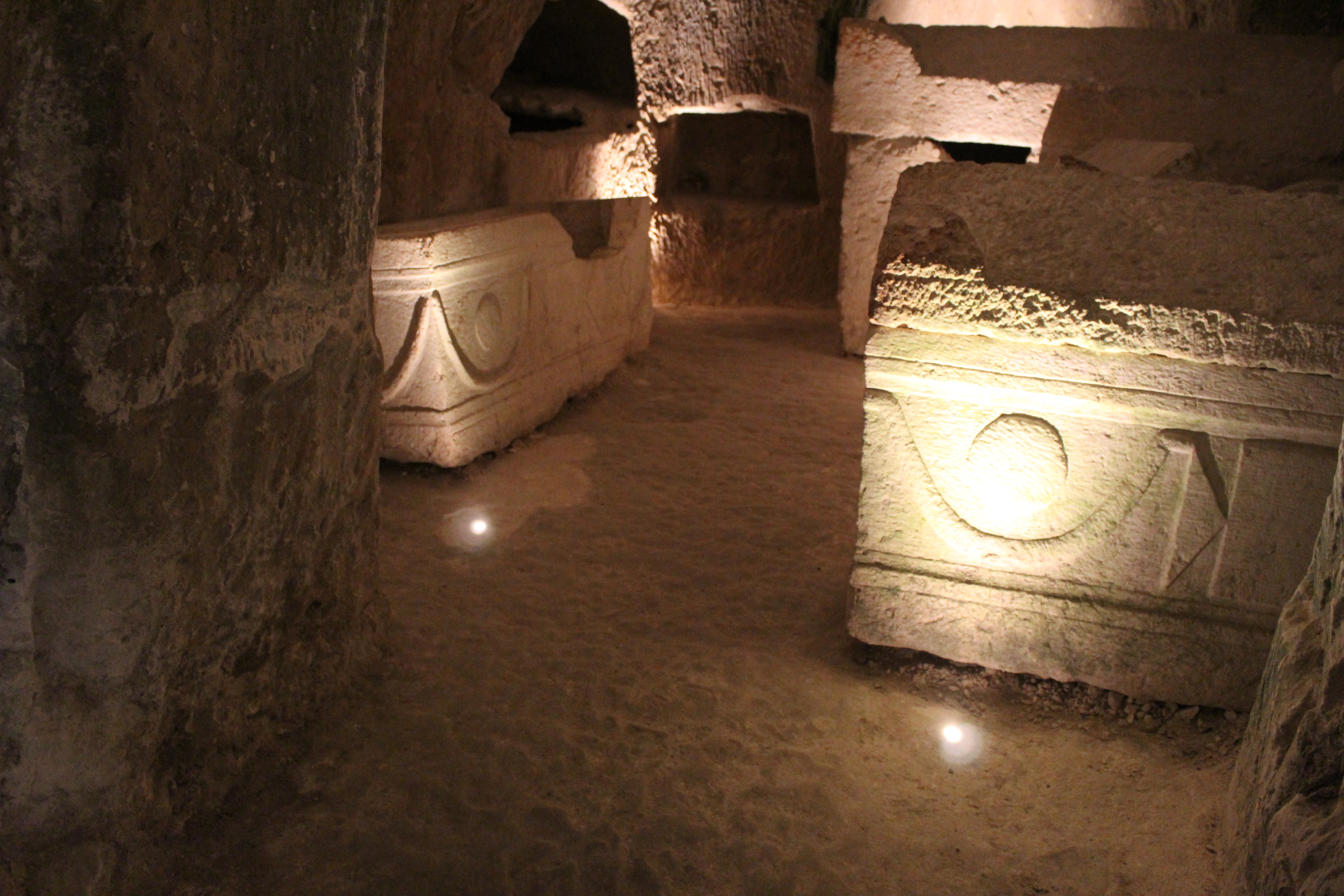
Sarcophagi

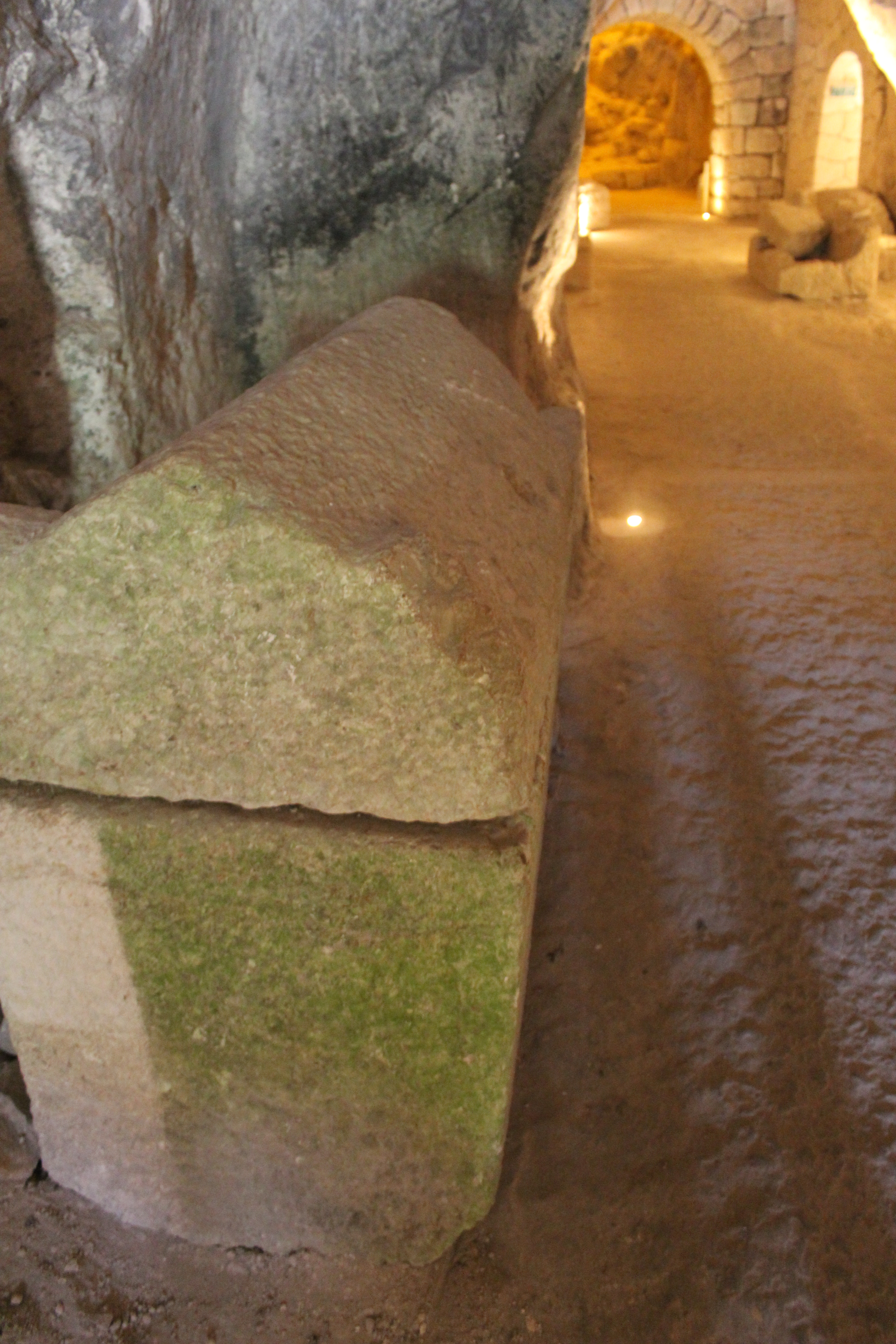
Sarcophagus in a catacomb corridor

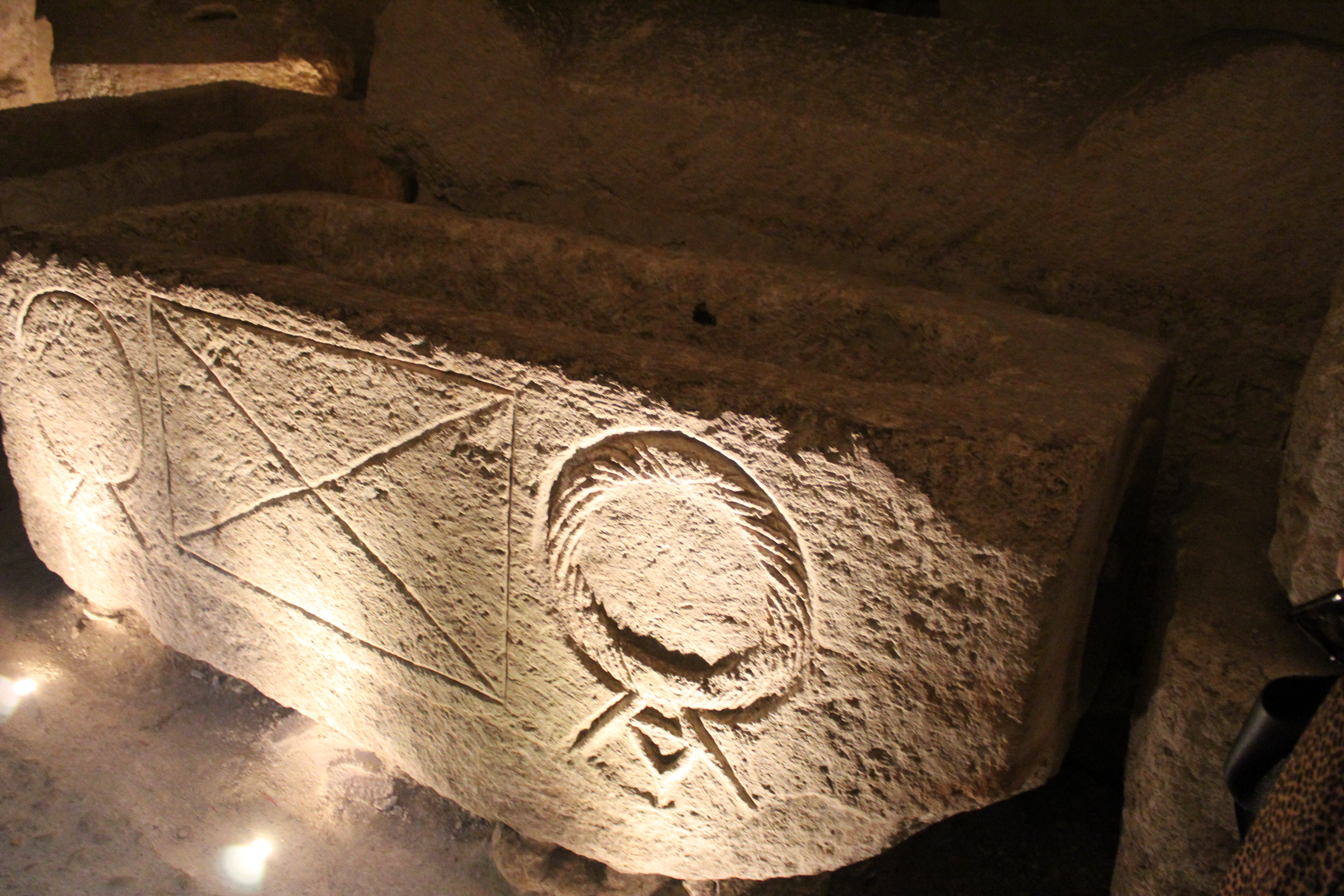
Sarcophagus

== Bibliography ==
- Avigad, N. (1958). Excavations at Beit She'arim, 1955 - Preliminary Report. Jerusalem: Israel Exploration Society.
- Conder, C.R.; Kitchener, H.H. (1881). The Survey of Western Palestine: Memoirs of the Topography, Orography, Hydrography, and Archaeology. Vol. 1. London: Committee of the Palestine Exploration Fund.
- Hirschberg, Haim Zeev (1946). Yisrā’ēl ba-‘Arāb, Tel Aviv (Hebrew).
- Hütteroth, Wolf-Dieter; Abdulfattah, Kamal (1977). Historical Geography of Palestine, Transjordan and Southern Syria in the Late 16th Century. Erlanger geographische Arbeiten. Vol. Sonderband 5. Erlangen, Germany: Vorstand der Fränkischen Geographischen Gesellschaft. ISBN 3-920405-41-2.
- Mazar (Maisler), Benjamin (1957). Beth She'arim: Report on the Excavations during 1936–1940 (in Hebrew). Vol. I: Catacombs 1–4. Jerusalem: Israel Exploration Society. OCLC 492594574.
- Negev, Avraham; Gibson, Shimon, eds. (2001). "Beth Sharim". Archaeological Encyclopedia of the Holy Land. New York and London: Continuum. pp. 86–87. ISBN 0-8264-1316-1.
- Sharon, Moshe (2004). "Beth She'arāyim (Beth She'arīm) (Shaykh Buraik)". Corpus Inscriptionum Arabicarum Palaestinae (CIAP), vol. III: D–F. Handbook of Oriental Studies, Section 1: The Near and Middle East. Vol. 30/3. Brill Publishers. pp. XXXVII–XLV. doi:10.1163/9789047404675_001. ISBN 978-90-04-13197-2.
- Zelcer, Heshey (2002). A Guide to the Jerusalem Talmud. Universal Publishers. ISBN 9781581126303.
