= Ono Academic College – Haredi Campus =

Coordinates: 32.0213°N 34.8600°E

Ono Academic College
- הקמפוס החרדי - הקריה האקדמית אונו
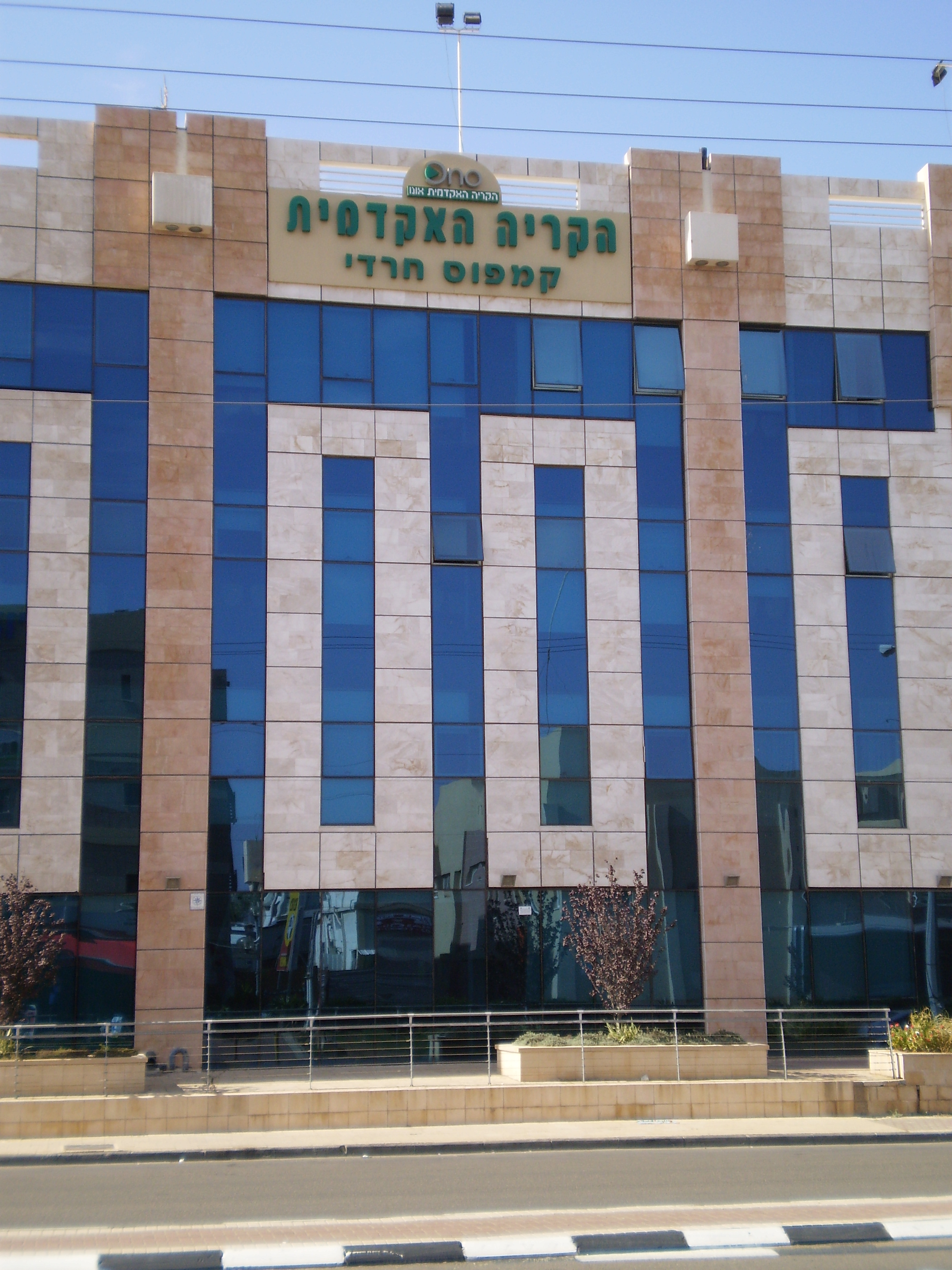
- Type: Private
- Established: 2001
- Chairman: Rabbi Ychezkel Fogel
- Dean: D.R. Eyul Maose
- Students: Close to 3,000
- Location: Or Yehuda, Israel
- Website: www.ono.ac.il

Ono Academic College – Haredi Campus (Hebrew: הקמפוס החרדי - הקריה האקדמית אונו, romanized: Ha'kampus Ha'charedi - Ha'kiryah Ha'akademit Ono) is a satellite campus of Ono Academic College in Or Yehuda and Jerusalem catering to the Haredi Jewish population.

== History ==
Ono Academic College – Haredi Campus is the largest haredi college in Israel, with an undergraduate population of nearly 3,000. It is also the only haredi college that offers courses in Legal Studies. The college was established in 2001 by Ranan Hartman. In 2003, Rabbi Yehezkel Fogel was appointed chairman of the campus. Classes are held in accordance with an Orthodox lifestyle. Men and women have different days of study and students sign a commitment to dress modestly.

56% of the students are men, of whom 67% are married. Women constitute 44% of the students, of whom 35% are married. 86% of students are aged 18–30.

The late president Shimon Peres, former chief of staff Gabi Ashkenazi, Bank of Israel Governor Stanley Fischer, Labor leader MK Shelly Yachimovich, and former media personality Yair Lapid were hosted on campus.

Alumni include Knesset members Yigal Guetta, Moshe Arbel, Uriel Buso, Omer Yankelevich and Amnon Cohen.

== Study tracks ==
Program tracks include first degrees in the following subjects: Law (LLB), Business Management (BA, with specializations in accounting, information systems analysis, finance and capital markets, and marketing and management), Occupational Therapy (BOT), communication disorders (BA), and advertising and marketing communications.
