= Stephen Gilson =

American theorist and policy analyst (born 1950)

- Born: 1950 (age 75–76); Long Beach, California, U.S.
- Scientific career
- Fields: Theory, analysis
- Institutions: Interdisciplinary Disability Studies at the University of Maine

Stephen Gilson (born 1950) is an American theorist and policy analyst who is well known for his work in disability, diversity, and health policy through the lens of legitimacy theory and disjuncture theory. Co-authored with Elizabeth DePoy, Gilson developed Explanatory Legitimacy Theory. Through that lens, Gilson analyzes how population group membership is assigned, is based on political purpose, and is met with formal responses that serve both intentionally and unintentionally to perpetuate segregation, economic status quo, and inter-group tension. Additionally, co-authored with DePoy, Gilson developed Disjuncture Theory. This theory explains disability as an interactive “ill-fit” between bodies (broadly defined) and environments that results in task failure. Through this theoretical scaffold, anyone may experience disjuncture and thus disability, eliminating the binary, and maintaining the integrity of all models of disability to do reparative and reinventive work

Gilson has applied legitimacy theory and disjuncture theory to the analysis and enactment of health policy and practices related to access and to illness prevention. Along with DePoy, Gilson has implemented his vision of socially equitable policy and responses to humans based in his teaching and scholarship.

Most recently, Gilson has recaptured his art background applying it to scholarship in visual and material culture and illustrating DePoy's 7th edition of Introduction to research methods text. Also with DePoy as co-author, he published Disability Design and Branding, Disability as Humanness, and is currently turning his attention to new work in contemporary aging archeology. In these works, he mines the meaning of the visual and contextual in essentializing groups. His work is committed to analysis and reinvention of thinking as ways to promote equity. DePoy, E., & Gilson, S. F. (2013). Disability design and branding: Rethinking disability within the 21st century. In L. J. Davis (Ed.), The disability studies reader (4th ed., pp. 485–492). Taylor & Francis/Routledge.

DePoy, E., & Gilson, S. F..(2022) Emerging thoughts in disability and humanness. Anthem Press. (Anthem Press; Wikipedia)

== Biography ==
He spent years as an artist before earning a BA in 1973, and PhD in 1991 from the University of Nebraska Medical Center.

=== Recent activities ===
In Rethinking Disability, first published in 2004, and Disability as Disjuncture, an article published in 2015, Gilson with co-author Elizabeth DePoy, takes on the essentialist nature of current diversity categories with a particular focus on disability, laying bare the value foundation and political and economic purposes of the “disability category” assignment and social, professional and community response. His subsequent works, also co-authored with DePoy, include The Human Experience, published in 2007, Evaluation Practice (2008), Studying Disability (2010), and selected essays and papers. This scholarship applies legitimacy and disjuncture theories to understanding human description and explanation and valuation or devaluation

In 2014, Gilson, with co-author DePoy, applied design theory and practice to the analysis of diversity categories, their membership and their maintenance. In his applied work, he has invoked this theory to develop inexpensive, aesthetically designed prototypestrategies, products that enhance the ability of all people to engage in healthy behaviors. His work on Afari, a three-wheeled aesthetically designed mobility support appeared in the Cooper Hewitt, Smithsonian Design Museum in the Access+Ability exhibit in 2017. In 2022, his co-authored book, Emerging Thoughts in Disability and Humaness was published by Anthem. This work examined the dehumanization of embodied difference and proposed a theoretical approach to innovating equality of respect and rights for all people. He has expanded his work to examine the meaning of humanness and aging in recent work. Gilson is currently professor and co-coordinator of Interdisciplinary Disability Studies at the University of Maine.

== Awards ==
- Guest Research Scientist. National Institute on Alcohol Abuse and Alcoholism. Bethesda, MD. 1988–1991.
- Fellow. National Institute on Drug Abuse. Intramural Research Training Award. Addiction Research Center - Neuroimaging and Drug Action Section. Baltimore, MD. National Institutes of Health. Baltimore and Bethesda, MD, 1991–1993.
- Visiting Researcher Appointment, National Institute on Drug Abuse. Addiction Research Center - Neuroimaging and Drug Action Section. Baltimore, MD. Summer. National Institutes of Health. Baltimore, MD, 1995.
- CSWE Commission on the Role and Status of Women “Feminist Scholarship Award for 2000.” E. P. Cramer, S. F. Gilson, and E. DePoy – “Experiences of Abuse and Service Needs of Abused Women with Disabilities”.
- Allan Meyers Award for Scholarship in Disability, American Public Health Association, September 2005.
- Faculty Fellowship Summer Institute in Israel, Society for Peace in the Middle East, Summer, 2008. Sponsored by Bar-Ilan University, Hebrew University of Jerusalem, Ben-Gurion University of the Negev, Tel Aviv University, University of Haifa, Technion – Israel Institute of Technology, Jewish National Fund, Media Watch International, Scholars for Peace in the Middle East.
- 2008 University Center for Excellence in Developmental Disabilities (AUCD), Multicultural Council Award for Leadership in Diversity.
- 2009 University of Maine, Department of Psychology, Stanley Sue Distinguished Lecture Series, Diversity Lecture - "Now guess who is coming to the diversity dinner: Disability and beyond bodies and backgrounds".
- 2009 Society for Disability Studies (SDS), Senior Scholar Award.

== Recent Selected works ==
DePoy, E. & Gilson, S.F. (2022). Emerging thoughts in disability and humanness. Anthem Press.

DePoy, E., & Gilson, S. (2024, December 22). Is disability “Un-included” in higher education. Medium.

Gilson, S., & DePoy, E. (2024). The biological person. In E. Hutchison (Ed.), Essentials of human behavior: Integrating person, environment, and the life course (7th ed). Thousand Oaks, CA: Sage

DePoy, E & Gilson S.F. (2022). Active Aging: Rethinking the Use of Everyday Objects Tech Enhanced Life. https://www.techenhancedlife.com/citizen-research/active-aging-rethinking-use-everyday-objects

Noghani, M.; Browning, D.; Caccese, V.; Depoy, E.; Gilson, S.; Beaumont, R.; & Hejrati, B. (2022). Design and evaluation of the Afari: A three-wheeled mobility and balance support for outdoor exercise. Assistive Technology.

DePoy, E. Brzozwski, R, Gilson, S.F. (2021). Aging farmers: Needs and ingenuity. Journal of Rural Health

DePoy, E. & Gilson, S.F. (2021). Digital Juncture: A Model for Social Work Ethics and Practice. In F. Ozsungur, (Ed).Handbook of Research on Policies, Protocols, and Practices for Social Work in the Digital World. IGI Scientific Publishing.

DePoy, E. & Gilson, S.F. (2021). Disability in L. Kaye (Ed.), Handbook of Rural Aging.

DePoy, E., & Gilson, S.F. (2021). Human behavior theory and applications: A critical thinking approach ed 2.

DePoy, E. & Gilson, S.F. (2021). Rethinking everyday objects. Tech Enhanced Life.

Gilson, S.F., & DePoy, E. (2020). Disability Identity. In D.Gu and M.E. Dupre (Eds.) Encyclopedia of Gerontology and Population Aging, Springer Nature Switzerland AG, Gewerbestrasse. Switzerland.
