= Nurit Koren =

Israeli politician (born 1960)

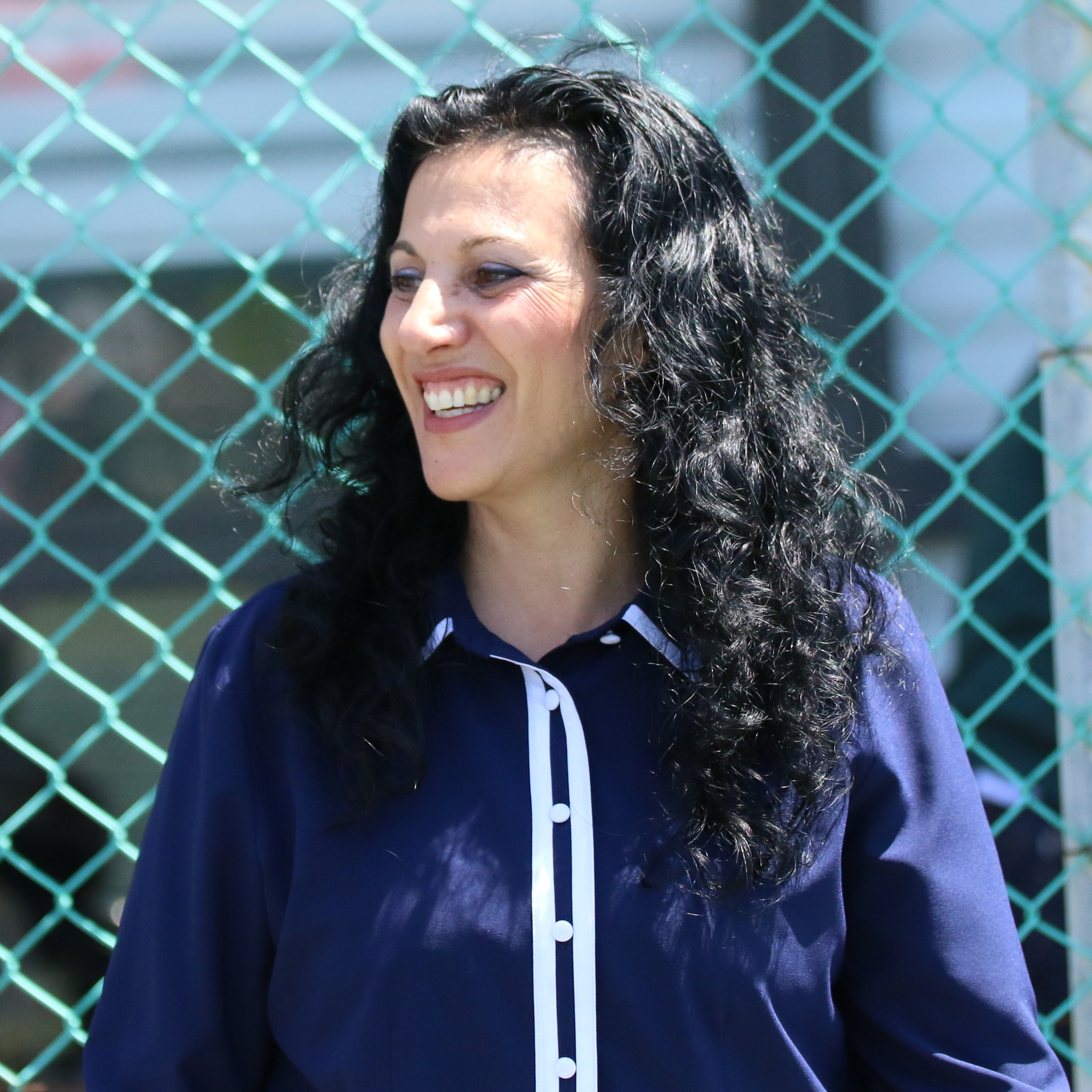
- Koren in 2016

Faction represented in the Knesset
- 2015–2019: Likud

Personal details
- Born: 24 February 1960 (age 66) Jerusalem, Israel

Nurit Koren (Hebrew: נורית קורן; born 24 February 1960) is an Israeli lawyer and politician. She served as a member of the Knesset for Likud between 2015 and 2019.

== Biography ==
Koren was born in Jerusalem to Yemenite Jewish immigrants, and has four brothers. Her father was a laborer, truck driver and taxi driver. Her family was traditional, and Koren attended a Bais Yaakov school. In 1971 her family moved to Kiryat Arba and she later studied at the Givat Washington religious youth village. Aged 17 she married Eli Koren and relocated with him to Herzliya, where she studied at the Rishonim High School until she became pregnant. Later, aged 38, she began studying at the Open University of Israel and received a BA in social sciences and humanities, graduating with honors, then studied law, receiving a BA in law from Ono Academic College and an MA in law from Bar-Ilan University.

Koren lives in Herzliya and has four children.

== Political career ==
Koren worked as the office manager for Gilad Erdan while he was Minister of Environmental Protection from 2010 to 2012.

Prior to the 2015 Knesset elections she was placed twenty-eighth on the Likud list, and was elected to the Knesset as Likud won 30 seats. She lost her seat in the April 2019 elections after being placed forty-third on the party's list, despite Likud gaining five seats.

== See also ==
- Israeli women
