= Beit She'arim (moshav) =

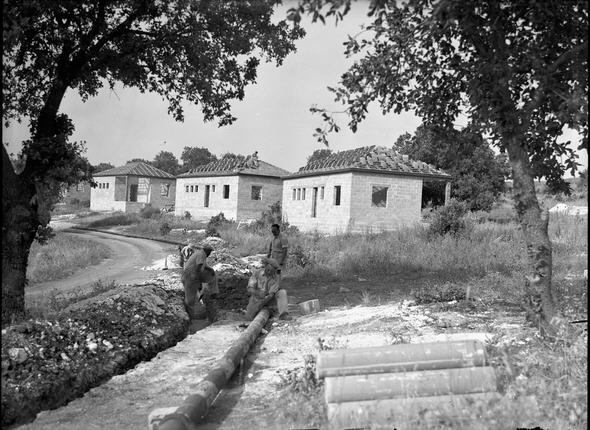

- Location within Jezreel Valley region of Israel Location within Israel
- Coordinates: 32°41′46″N 35°10′38″E
- Country: Israel
- District: Northern
- Subdistrict: Jezreel
- Council: Jezreel Valley
- Affiliation: Moshavim Movement
- Founded: 1936
- Founder: Yugoslavia and Eastern Europe Jews
- Population (2024): 700

Beit She'arim (Hebrew: בֵּית שְׁעָרִים, lit. 'House of Gates') is a moshav in northern Israel. Located in the Galilee near Ramat Yishai, it falls under the jurisdiction of Jezreel Valley Regional Council. As of 2024 it had a population of 700.

Moshav Beit She'arim is named after the ancient town of Bet She'arayim, also known as Bet She'arim, the remains of which are in Beit She'arim National Park, five kilometers east of the moshav.

== History ==
During the 1920s Luise Lea Zaloscer and her sister Klara Barmaper organized the purchase of the site on behalf of the Jewish National Fund in Yugoslavia. In 1926 a group of immigrants from Yugoslavia settled in the place and established a moshav, taking the name from the ancient city of Beit She'arim, the ruins of which are today a national park that was declared a World Heritage Site by UNESCO in 2015. Due to economic hardships the majority of the first settlers left in the 1930s, and in 1936 the moshav was re-established by members of HaNoar HaOved VeHaLomed, immigrants from Yugoslavia and Eastern Europe.

== Notable residents ==
- Muki Betser
- Rina Mor
- Amikam Norkin
- Yeftah Norkin

== See also ==
- Beit She'arim National Park
