= Elizabeth DePoy =

Elizabeth DePoy is a disability theorist, professor of interdisciplinary disability studies, social work, and cooperating faculty in mechanical engineering at the University of Maine and also senior research fellow. Ono Academic College, Research Institute for Health and Medical Professions. Kiryat Ono, Israel.

She is best known for her work in methods of inquiry, legitimacy theory, and disjuncture theory. Co-authored with Stephen Gilson, DePoy developed Explanatory Legitimacy Theory. They analyze how population group membership is assigned, is based on political purpose, and is met with formal responses that serve both intentionally and unintentionally to perpetuate segregation, economic status quo, and inter-group tension. Disjuncture theory explains disability as task failure based on an interactive “ill-fit” between bodies (broadly defined) and environments (broadly defined). It always begins with a task that cannot be done thereby shifting the focus of disability from the body or hostile environment to failure to do a desired or needed task. In this manner, the binary of disabled-non-disabled is removed. Based on disjuncture theory and their 2014 book, DePoy and Gilson are now engaged in the development of non-stigmatizing mobility equipment. One of their innovations, Afari, has been part of the Access +Ability exhibit at the Smithsonian Cooper Hewitt Design Museum Most recently, DePoy has expanded her work to look at disability and alterity in general as a function of infrahumanization. Her 2022 book, co-authored with Stephen Gilson, proposes the concept of humanness literacy, a future vision of diversity belonging to all and in which essentialism is exposed as fractious and thus is eliminated.

== Biography ==
DePoy was born in 1950 and grew up in New York. She earned a BS in 1972 from SUNY at Buffalo and PhD in 1988 from the University of Pennsylvania. She has been teaching in higher education since then in several universities throughout the U.S.

She is a principle in ASTOS Innovations, a non-profit corporation devoted to improving equality of access to community resources in local, national, and global environments.

In her initial book on disability theoryRethinking Disability (2004, with co-author Stephen Gilson, she discussed the essentialist nature of current diversity categories with a particular focus on disability, showing the value foundation and political and economic purpose of “disability category” assignment and social, professional and community response. Her subsequent works, also co-authored with Gilson, include The Human Experience (2007), applying legitimacy theory to understanding theories of human description and explanation and their purposive, political use in diverse “helping professional” and engineering worlds.

Building on previous work, she and Gilson, apply design theory and practice to the analysis of diversity categories, their membership, and their maintenance. She argues that current approaches to understanding and responding to diversity are grand narratives that advantage the market and professional economy while perpetuating difference and inter-group struggle, truncating social justice and limiting equality of opportunity. Currently, she and Gilson have advanced their work, forensically analyzing disability through a dehumanization lens. This analysis serves as the basis for a non-essentialist reinvention of disability and diversity within a pragmatic ethical framework.

== Books ==
- DePoy, E. & Gilson, S.F.(2022) Emerging thoruhgs in disability and humanness. London: Anthem.
- DePoy, E. & Gitlin, L. (2020) Introduction to research 6 ed. St Louis, MO, Elsevier
- DePoy, E. & Gilson, S.F. (2017) Social Work research and evaluation. Thousand Oaks, CA, Sage.
- DePoy, E., & Gilson, S.F. (2014) Branding and designing disability. London, Routledge.
- DePoy, E., & Gilson, S.F. (2012). Human behavior theory and applications: A critical thinking approach. Thousand Oakes, CA: Sage Publications.
- DePoy, E. & Gitlin, L (2011) Introduction to research: Multiple strategies for health and human services 4th ed. St. Louis, MO: Mosby.
- DePoy, E. & Gilson, S.F. (2011) Studying Disability: Multiple Theories and responses. Thousand Oaks, Sage
- DePoy, E. & Gilson S. (2008). Evaluation practice: How to do good evaluation research in work settings. New York: Routledge.
- DePoy, E. & Gilson S. (2007) The human experience: Description, explanation, and judgment. Lanham, MD: Rowman & Littlefield.
- DePoy, E. & Gitlin, L. (2005) Introduction to research: Multiple strategies for health and human services 3rd ed. St. Louis, MO: Mosby.
- DePoy, E. & Gilson S.F. (2004) Rethinking Disability: Principles for Professional and Social Change. Pacific Grove, CA: Brooks-Cole.
- DePoy, E. & Gilson S. (2003) Evaluation practice. New York, NY, Taylor and Francis.

== Awards ==
- University of Maine Trustee Professorship, 2013-2014
- Distinguished Lifetime Achievement Award, American Public Health Association, October 2008.
- Allan Meyers Award for Scholarship in Disability, American Public Health Association, September 2005
- Fulbright Senior Specialist Scholar, Grant awarded to Assuit University, Assuit, Egypt, March, 2003
- Feminist Scholarship Award-Council on Social Work Education, March 2000.

== Sources ==
- "Interdisciplinary Studies at the University of Maine". DIS 650 Research Seminar in Disability Studies. Archived from the original on 2007-12-02.
- Purdue University, 12th citation (November 14, 2007). "How to Communicate Your Research Results". Purdue University. Archived from the original on October 29, 2007.
- "International Conference on Technology, Knowledge, and Society". Universal Web Access: An Intelligent Web Interface. 2005-05-20. Archived from the original on 2007-08-30.
- Albrecht, Gary L. (2006). Encyclopedia of Disability. Sage Publications. ISBN 9780761925651.
- Albrecht, Gary L. (2006). Encyclopedia of Disability. Sage Publications. ISBN 9780761925651.
- "CCIDS News". DePoy Receives 2007 Presidential Research and Creative Achievement Award (5/11/07). Archived from the original on 2007-12-16.
