= Ono Academic College =

Private college in Kiryat Ono, Israel

Coordinates: 32°2′57.11″N 34°51′43.4″E

- הקריה האקדמית אונו
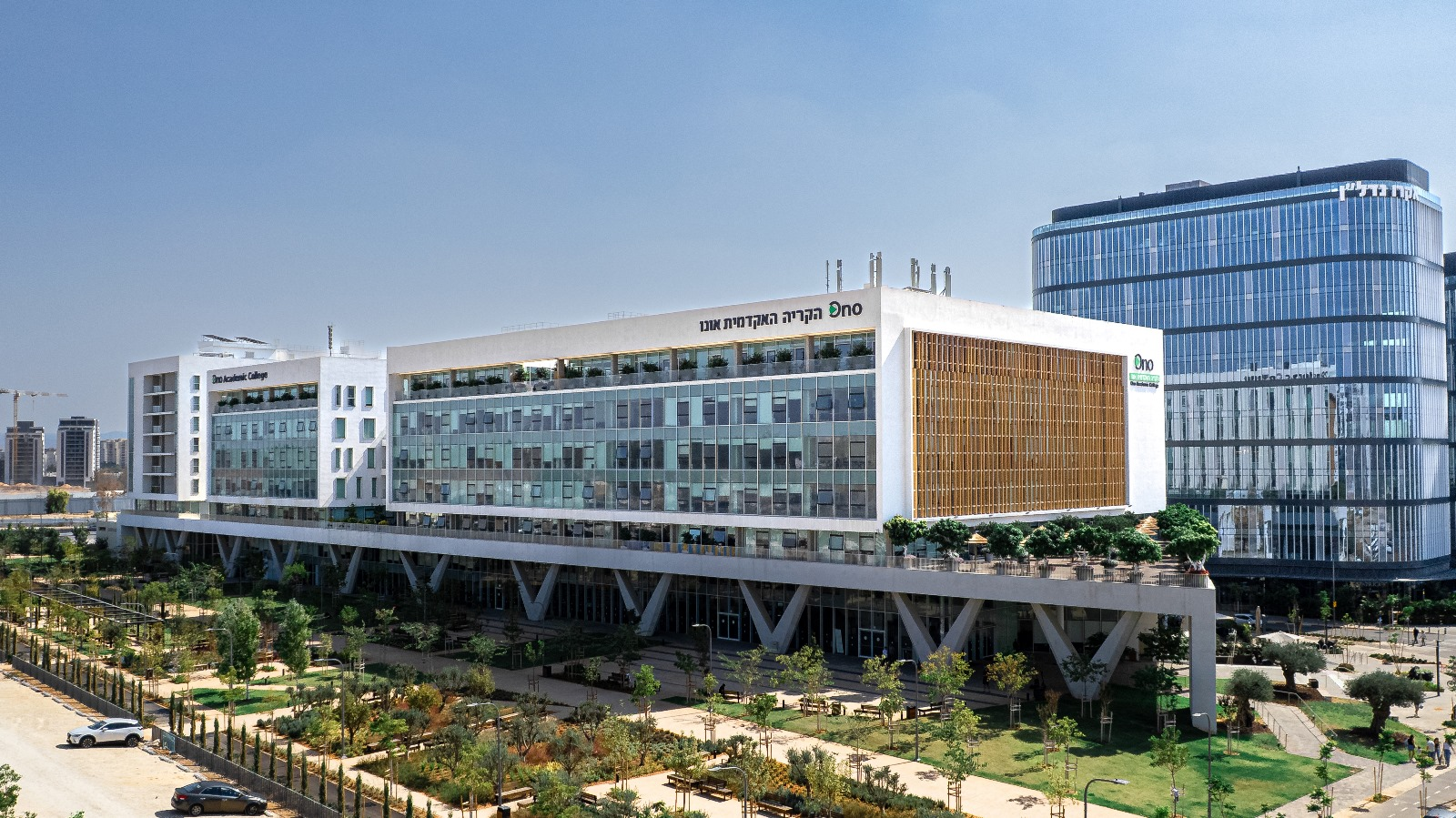
- Type: Private
- Established: 1995; 31 years ago
- Chancellor: Moshe Ben Horin
- President: Moshe Ben Horin
- Students: 18,000
- Location: Kiryat Ono, Israel
- Website: www.ono.ac.il
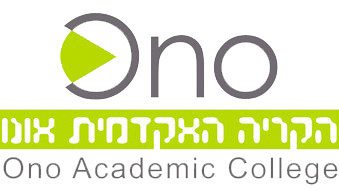

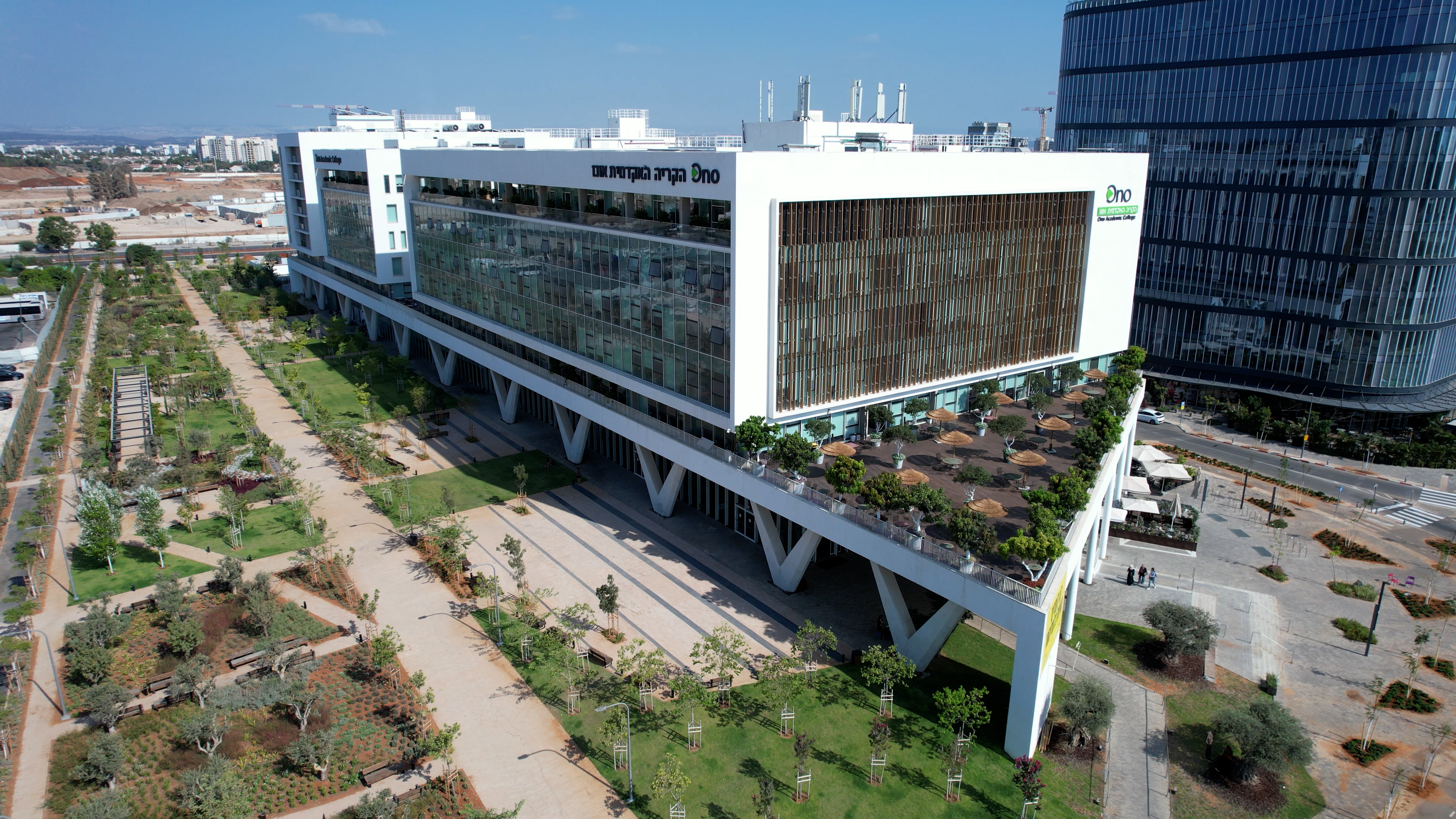
Ono Academic College main campus, Kiryat Ono

Ono Academic College (in Hebrew: הקריה האקדמית אונו) is a private college located in Kiryat Ono, Israel with over 18,000 students.

== History ==
Ono Academic College was founded in 1995 by Ranan Hartman, son of rabbi and philosopher David Hartman, with the goal of opening up the country's higher education system to populations that are perceived as marginalized.

The college was initially affiliated with the University of Manchester before becoming an Israeli school fully accredited by the Council for Higher Education in Israel. Starting out in a single trailer with 100 law and business students, enrollment has risen to 18,000 students at five campuses around the country: Kiryat Ono, Jerusalem, Haifa, Netanya and Or Yehuda. The school offers 47 programs of study.

OAC's satellite campuses in Or Yehuda and Jerusalem offer programs geared toward the Haredi Jewish population, allowing men and women to attend classes on different days, while Muslim, Christian and Jewish religious leaders attend classes together in a special joint program in law. The college also has a substantial enrollment of Ethiopian-Israelis. In the early days of the school, after Hartman was asked by the Jewish Agency to accept an Ethiopian-Israeli student to the law school, he arranged for scholarships for needy Ethiopian immigrants, and over 1,000 Ethiopian-Israeli students have graduated from the institution, including Pnina Tamano-Shata, the first Ethiopia-born woman to join the Knesset and become a government minister.

In 2012, OAC opened a special track for students with Asperger syndrome that offers a bachelor's degree in business administration. The school also offers a specialized B.A. program for Druze women. The Center for Academic Accessibility provides assistance to special needs students to assure that individuals with disabilities are not barred from obtaining academic degrees. In 2013, the college established Ro'im Rachok, a 4-month training course which prepares young adults with autism for service in the Israel Defense Forces.

In 2016, the college opened the Jonathan Wohl School of Music headed by Israel Prize laureate Noam Sheriff. At the dedication ceremony Sheriff spoke about the universal language of music and how this fit in with the goals of the college.

A new multidisciplinary campus was commissioned at Savyon Junction to incorporate academic buildings, offices in 2020. Construction began in 2021. It was completed and opened in 2023.

== Faculties ==
- Faculty of Law
- Faculty of Business Administration
- Faculty of Health Professions
- Faculty of Humanities and Social Sciences
- Faculty of Marketing Communications
- Jonathan Wohl School of Music

== Multicultural projects ==
In an attempt to integrate students from different population groups, the college offers a creative writing project in Arabic and Hebrew, a weekly phone-in program to establish rapport between secular and Haredi women, and a talk program led by Jewish and Muslim religious leaders to discuss ways of bridging the conflict.

== Controversy ==
Ono College has been criticized for its policy of gender segregation for students from the Haredi community. According to Haaretz, Jews and Arabs attend separate classes, although Arab students who are proficient in Hebrew have a choice of studying with the Jews or joining an Arab class. The college has also been criticized for budgetary irregularities and inflated salaries. In 2019, the college instituted a recovery program that reduced teaching hours, lowered hourly payments and cut administrative personnel.

== Notable faculty ==
- Gabriela Shalev, rector of Ono Academic College, former Israeli ambassador to the United Nations
- Noam Sheriff, dean of Jonathan Wohl School of Music, music director of the Israel Chamber Orchestra
- Shai Piron, dean of social development, former Israeli minister of education
- Shira Yalon-Chamovitz, dean of students, director of the Israel Institute on Cognitive Accessibility
- Shmuel Hauser, chairman of the Israeli Securities Authority
- Tova Hartman, dean of humanities
- Yechiel Leiter, Jewish political philosophy
- Yaron Zelekha, former Israeli Ministry of Finance accountant general
- Elizabeth DePoy, disability theorist
- Khaled Kabub, Israeli Supreme Court judge
- Gabriel Hallevy, professor of law

== Notable alumni ==
- Rachel Adato, former member of Knesset
- Itamar Ben-Gvir, member of Knesset
- Amnon Cohen, former member of Knesset
- Gila Gamliel, Member of Knesset, former deputy minister in the Prime Minister's Office
- Nurit Koren, former member of Knesset
- Bezalel Smotrich, member of Knesset
- Pnina Tamano-Shata, first Ethiopian-Israeli woman to win a Knesset seat, Member of Knesset
- Omer Yankelevich, member of Knesset, Minister of Diaspora Affairs

== See also ==
- List of universities and colleges in Israel
- Education in Israel
- Ono Academic College - Haredi Campus
