= Catacombs of Santa Felicita =

Catacombs in Rome, Italy

Coordinates: 41.917869°N 12.497285°E

The Catacombs of Santa Felicita or Catacomb of Maximus is a three-level complex of catacombs on the modern via Salaria in the modern Salario quarter of Rome. In the 17th century it was also known as the Catacomb of Sant'Antonio after the patron saint of the Vienne monastery which owned the land in which it fell.

== History ==
It was originally named after Maximus, the owner of the land in which it was dug, but was renamed after its main burial, that of Felicitas of Rome, after the edict of Milan of 313 made Christianity legal - it appears under her name for the first time in the Liber Pontificalis. The Depositio martyrum for 10 July records her martyrdom and that of another seven martyrs, all under Marcus Aurelius, stated in a legendary 5th century 'passio' to be her seven sons and daughters (of whom Martial, Vitale and Alexander were buried in the catacomb of the Iordani, Felix and Philip in that of Priscilla, Januarius in that of Praetextaus and Silanus with his mother).

Pope Boniface I (418-422) built a small underground basilica on the site dedicated to Silanus (with his remains in an altar in its foundations) and an above-ground oratory dedicated to Felicitas. He himself was buried in a semi-underground tomb joined to the oratory. These form the first and earliest level on the site. All three buildings were still visible in the 16th century and appear in Bufalini's 1551 map of Rome. When pope Leo III (early 9th century) translated Felicitas' remains to Santa Susanna within the city walls, the catacomb was little by little abandoned and forgotten.

At the end of the 18th century it was rediscovered near a crumbling building, from which a staircase led down to the catacombs. Marble plaques with inscriptions and tomb inscriptions were found and thanks to Giovanni Battista de Rossi's work in the 19th century the remains were found to be the catacombs of Felicitas. In 1884 a late 7th or early 8th century picture was found in the small basilica showing Felicitas surrounded by her seven children - De Rossi commissioned a copy of it by Gregorio Mariani and only fragments of the original now survive due to a wall collapse.
