= Saint Felicity =

Saint Felicity may refer to:

- Felicity of Rome (c. 101 - 165), saint numbered among the Christian martyrs
- Perpetua and Felicity, martyred at Carthage
