= Tomb of Priscilla =

First-century Roman tomb on the Appian Way, Italy

Tombs of the Via Latina
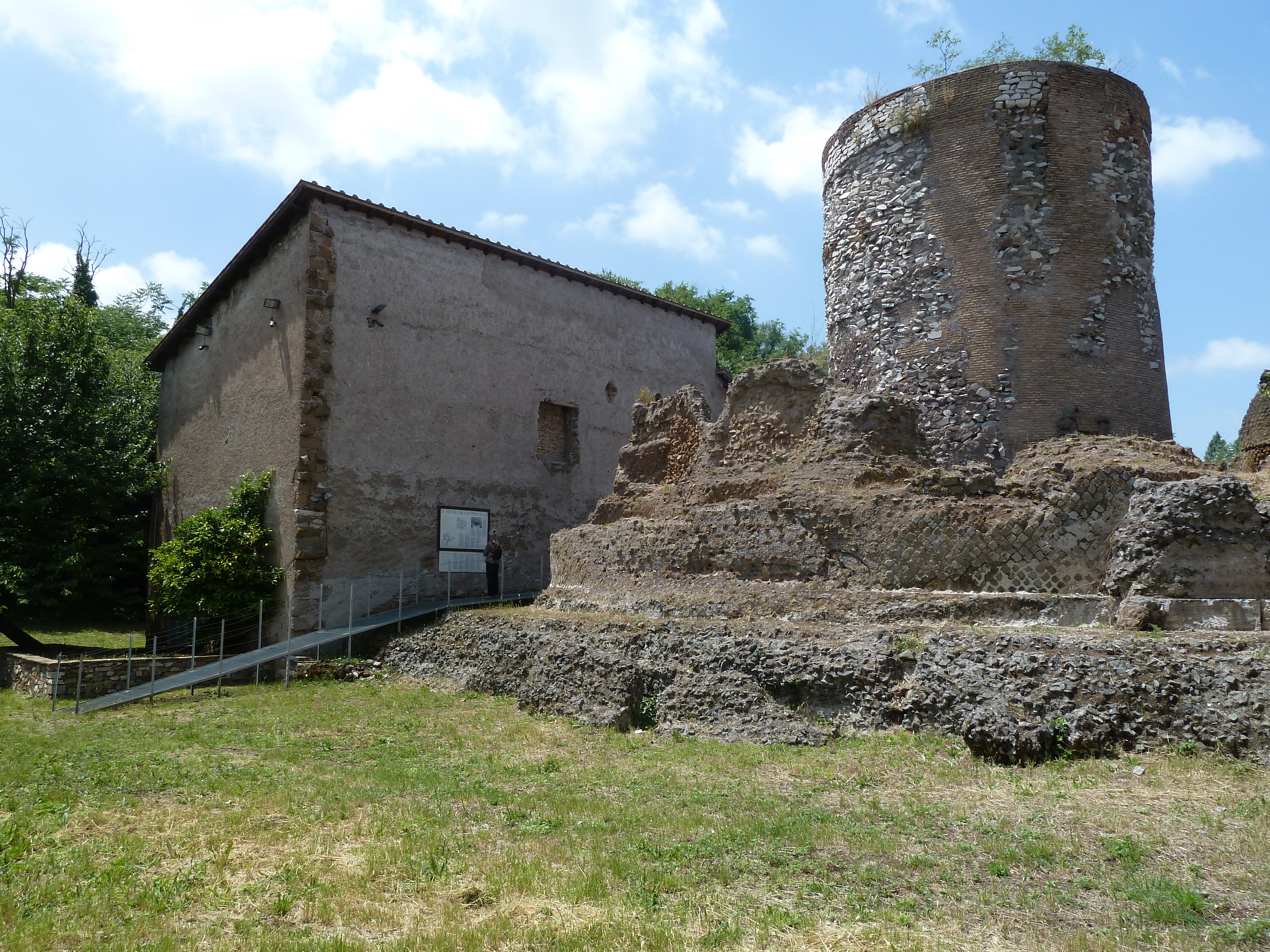
- Tomb of Priscilla
- Interactive map of Tombs of the Via Latina
- 41.8665°N 12.5031°E

The Tomb of Priscilla is a monumental tomb erected in the first century in Rome on the Appian Way (Via Appia Antica), situated opposite the Church of Domine Quo Vadis.

== Name ==
The Tomb belonged to Priscilla, wife of Titus Flavius Abascanto, a freedman of the emperor Domitian.

== Architecture ==
On a quadrangular base, covered with travertine blocks (opus quadratum), there were in the past two superimposed cylindrical towers, built in opus mixtum and opus reticulatum, the upper one with 13 niches designed to house statues of the dead.

The funerary cell covered by a barrel vault is entered via a corridor, currently accessible from the basement of one of the houses that are adjacent to the monument. The cell was coated within by blocks of travertine and included three niches designed to house sarcophagi.

== History ==
The tomb was used in the 11th century and later as a fortress. It belonged to the counts of Tusculum, and later the Caetani.

In modern times there were two farmhouses, one of which was the "Tavern of Acquataccio". The burial chamber was used as a store for maturing cheeses.

Preceded by Tombs of Via Latina	Landmarks of Rome; Tomb of Priscilla	Succeeded by Vigna Randanini
