= Vigna Randanini =

Jewish catacombs situated near the Appian Way near Rome, Italy

- Catacombe ebraiche di Vigna Randanini
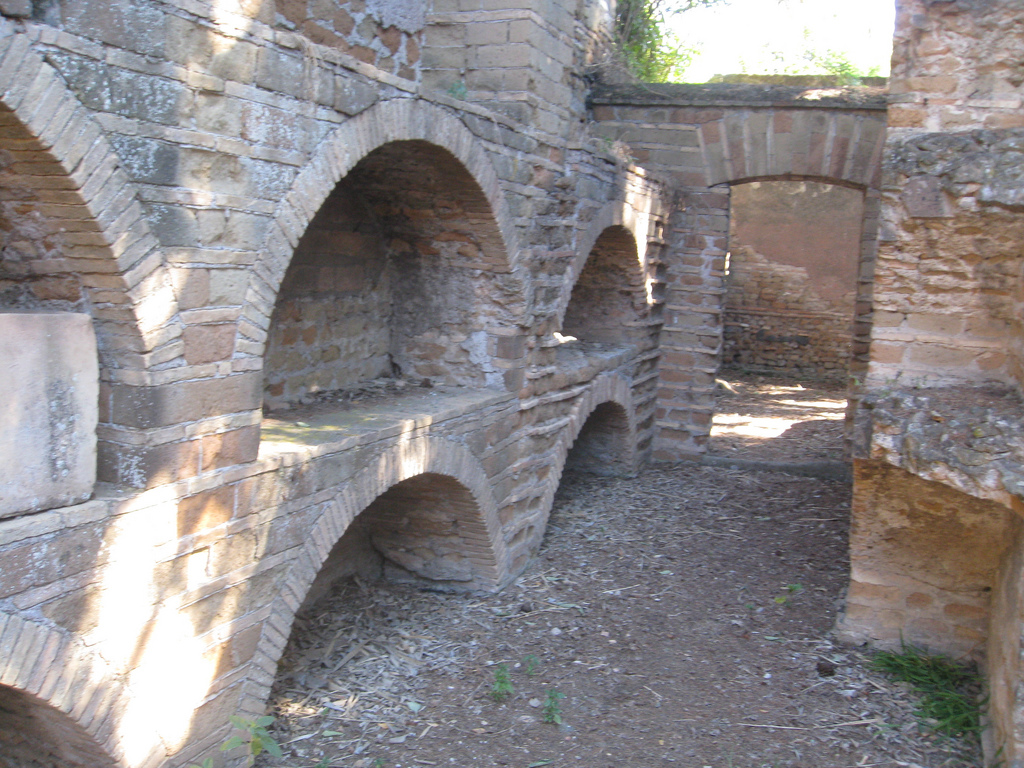
- Interactive map of Vigna Randanini
- 41.8575°N 12.5173°E
- Type: Catacombs
- Location: Rome, Via Appia Antica

History
- Built: 2nd-4th centuries CE

Site notes
- Management: Soprintendenza Speciale per i Beni Archeologici di Roma

The Vigna Randanini are Jewish Catacombs between the second and third miles of the Appian Way close to the Christian catacombs of Saint Sebastian, with which they were originally confused. The catacombs date between the 2nd and 5th-centuries CE using radiocarbon dating and take their name from the owners of the land when they were first formally discovered and from the fact that the land was used as a vineyard (vigna). While Vigna Randanini are just one of the two surviving Jewish catacombs in Rome open to the public, they can only be visited by appointment. They are partially situated below a private villa and entrance is from the Via Appia Pignatelli side. These catacombs were discovered by accident in 1859, although there is evidence that they had been pillaged before then. They cover an area of 18,000 square metres and the tunnels are around 700 metres long, of which around 400 can be seen.

== The synagogue ==
The entrance reused a pagan building, to which was added a vaulted ceiling and a floor mosaic with black and white tiles. This is thought to have been intended to be used as a synagogue, but actual evidence in support of such a notion is absent.

== The catacombs ==
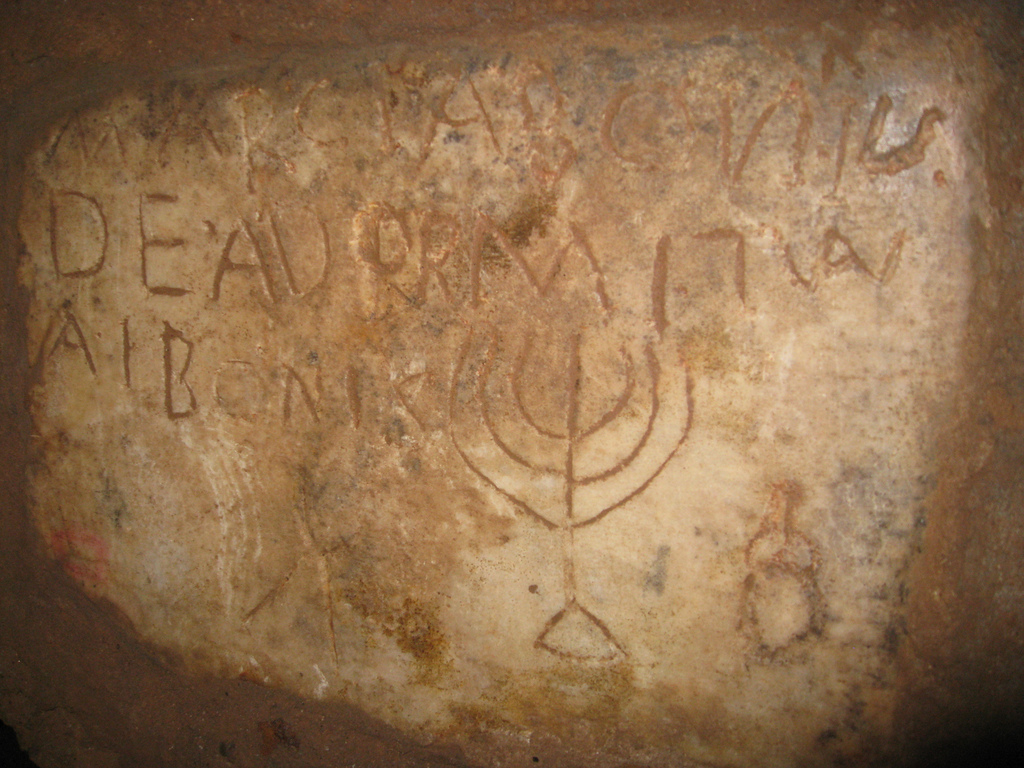
Menorah motif, Vigna Randanini

The catacombs, which are on two levels between 5 and 16.3 metres below the surface, were used between the 2nd and 5th centuries, with a recent study indicating that the cemetery contained a total of 1737 tombs. The catacomb can be shown to have developed gradually, from what appears to have been a burial site for group of families to a cemetery used by the Jewish community of ancient Rome at large. Burials are mostly of the loculi type, but there are also burial rooms fitted with arcosolia. A set of tombs in the oldest section of the catacomb are of the kokhim type, extending perpendicularly into the wall of the main gallery. Close parallels can be found in Roman Palestine, particularly in the Jerusalem area. Four burial chambers display pictorial decoration, displaying a Jewish iconography in the case of some and a pagan iconography in the case of others. This has given rise to discussions about the Jewishness of the catacomb during its original stages. The irregular plan of the catacombs suggests it grew over time with new land acquisition as more and more space was required.

The catacombs are unique because of their pictorial decoration. Wall paintings include renderings of a winged Victory in position to crown a naked young man, various figures such as peacocks, birds and baskets of flowers, Pegasus, roosters, chickens, peacocks and other birds. Next to the figure of Fortuna, there are a hippocampus and two dolphins. Epitaphs from these and the other Jewish catacombs in Rome suggest the existence of least eleven different Jewish communities in ancient Rome. They also provide important information on symbolism and Jewish iconography, such as the menorah, the lulav, the shofar, and Torah scrolls. As for the language of the surviving funerary inscriptions, 64.7% are in koine Greek, 23.5 % in vulgar Latin, and 11.8 are bilingual. There are no inscriptions in either Aramaic or Hebrew. The preponderance of Greek is indicative of an immigrant population.

== See also ==
- Jewish Museum of Rome
- Beit She'arim (Roman-era Jewish village)
- Beit She'arim National Park

Preceded by Tomb of Priscilla	Landmarks of Rome; Vigna Randanini	Succeeded by Pons Cestius
