= Giovanni Battista de Rossi (archaeologist) =

Italian archaeologist (1822–1894)

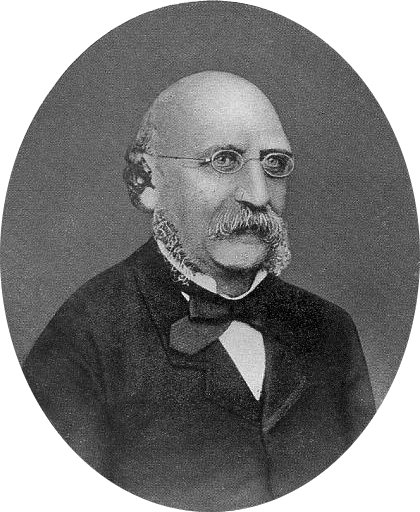
- Born: 23 February 1822; Rome, Papal States
- Died: 20 September 1894 (aged 72); Castel Gandolfo, Kingdom of Italy
- Education: Sapienza University of Rome
- Awards: Order of Pope Pius IX; Legion of Honour
- Scientific career
- Fields: Classical scholar, archaeologist
- Workplaces: Museo Pio Cristiano

Signature
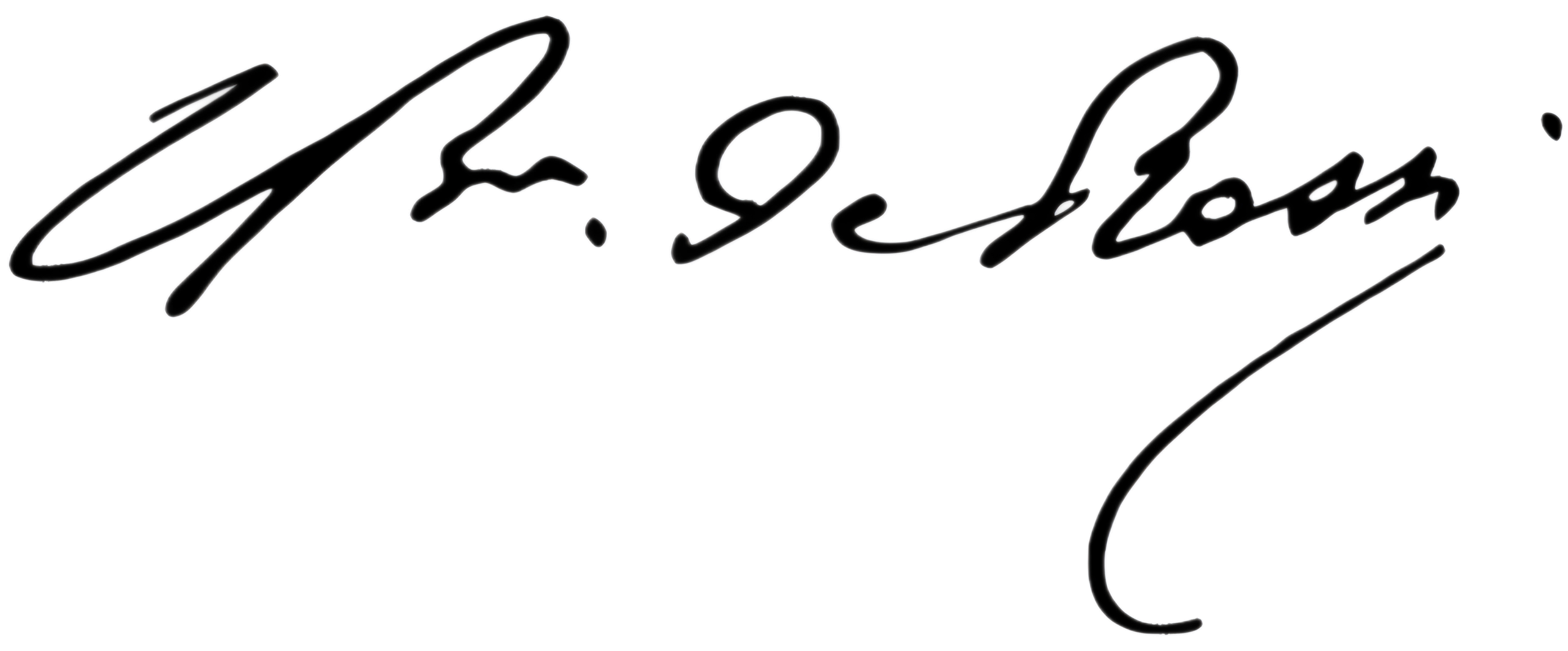

Giovanni Battista (Carlo) de Rossi (23 February 1822 – 20 September 1894) was an Italian archaeologist, famous even outside his field for rediscovering early Christian catacombs. He collaborated with Wilhelm Henzen and Theodor Mommsen in the compilation of the Corpus Inscriptionum Latinarum.

== Life and works ==
Born in Rome, he was the son of Commendatore Camillo Luigi De Rossi and Marianna Marchesa Bruti, his wife, who had two sons, Giovanni and Michele Stefano. Two days after birth, Giovanni was baptised in the parish church of Santa Maria sopra Minerva. De Rossi showed an early interest in Christian antiquity. In 1838, in company with his parents, he visited Tuscany, where the innumerable treasures of art completely absorbed his attention.

He studied philosophy at the Collegio Romano from 1838 to 1840. He then studied jurisprudence from 1840 to 1844 at the Sapienza, where he graduated with the degree of doctor utriusque juris ad honorem.

In 1841, notwithstanding the protests of his anxious father, he visited, for the first time, under the guidance of the Jesuit Giuseppe Marchi, one of the then much neglected catacombs. Despite having a significant age gap, De Rossi and Marchi continued their studies in archaeology together and became known as the "inseparable friends" as a result. He devised a strategy for the systematic and critical gathering of all Christian inscriptions in 1843. During the summers of 1844-50 he visited the territory of the ancient Hernici in Latium and also Naples; in this way the knowledge he attained of the period of the Roman Republic was not purely theoretical.

De Rossi was appointed scriptor at the Vatican Library soon after he finished his studies. He did take credit for living a modest and honourable life and was credited with his careful cataloguing of hundreds of Vatican manuscripts. The free use of the treasures of the Vatican Library and archives was a rich source of development for his intellectual powers, especially in the sense of breadth of interest. His official duties were not heavy, and he was able to carry on his private studies without hindrance.

He applied the sciences of archaeology and epigraphy, and leveraged his thorough knowledge of the topography of Rome, not to mention the resources of the Vatican Library, where he was employed cataloguing manuscripts. These skills he brought to Early Christian sites and guided the development of a new field, Christian archaeology. He travelled widely, knew all the museum collections intimately and was at the centre of a network of professional friendships with all the European scholars of his fields.

In 1849 he rediscovered the lost Catacombs of Callixtus along the Via Appia Antica, with Alexander de Richemont. The catacombs were opened in the early 3rd century, as the principal Christian cemetery in Rome, where nine 3rd-century popes were buried. He published illustrations by Gregorio Mariani. Around that time, De Rossi made the acquaintance of James Spencer Northcote, who had a keen interest in the archaeology of Christian Rome. Northcote and William Brownlow would later publish an English translation of De Rossi's Roma Sotterranea.

In 1853, the Prussian Academy of Sciences approved financing for the Corpus Inscriptionum Latinarum under the direction of Theodor Mommsen, Wilhelm Henzen, and de Rossi. De Rossi and Henzen were responsible for editing the Roman inscriptions, which make up the sixth volume of the CIL. Although Mommsen was the project's overall coordinator, de Rossi contributed invaluable expertise in Christian archaeology and early Christian epigraphy to the collection. Despite being a devout Catholic, de Rossi was held in high regard by Mommsen and was his closest Italian collaborator.

In 1873, he was elected as a member to the American Philosophical Society. In 1877 he became foreign member of the Royal Netherlands Academy of Arts and Sciences. In 1882, he was elected a member of the American Antiquarian Society.

In 1888, de Rossi discovered that the Codex Amiatinus, the earliest surviving manuscript of the complete Bible in the Latin Vulgate version, was related to the Bibles mentioned by Bede. It was also established that the Codex Amiatinus was related to the Greenleaf Bible fragment in the British Library. For a thousand years the Codex Amiatinus was believed to be Italian in origin. It was only at that time that de Rossi discovered that the original inscription was that of Ceolfrith of the English.

Giovanni Battista de Rossi died at Castel Gandolfo on 20 September 1894.

== Major works ==
- Inscriptiones christianae Urbis Romae septimo saeculo antiquiores (vol. I, Rome, 1861; part I of vol. II, Rome, 1888). His original plan was for a compendium of Christian inscriptions in the city of Rome of the first seven centuries. The series was continued after his death.
- La Roma Sotterranea Cristiana (vol. I with an atlas of forty plates, Rome, 1864; vol. II with an atlas of sixty-two and A, B, C, D plates, Rome, 1867; vol. III with an atlas of fifty-two plates, Rome, 1877). The plates for the fourth volume were already at the printer when De Rossi died. A Christian counterpart to an early classic of archaeology, Antonio Bosio's La Roma Sotterranea.
- Bullettino di archeologia cristiana. Six series of monographs and communications, which appeared monthly (1863–69), then quarterly (1870–75), (1876–81), then annually (1882–89), (1889–94), each series meticulously indexed.
- Musaici delle chiese di Roma anteriori al secolo XV (Rome, 1872), a series of coloured lithographs with text in French and Italian illustrating the Late Antique and medieval mosaics of Rome.
- Codicum latinorum bibliothecae Vaticanae Rossi's manuscript indexes of the Latin codices are used as reference books in the Vatican Library.
- Inscriptiones Urbis Romae latinae volume VI of Corpus Inscriptionum Latinarum (Berlin), of which Rossi was one of the leading editors.
- Martyrologium Hieronymianum, edited with Louis Duchesne in vol. 1, November, of the Bollandists' Acta Sanctorum. (Brussels, 1894).

== See also ==
Pontifical Commission of Sacred Archaeology
