= Gregorio Mariani =

Italian painter

Gregorio Mariani (24 August 1833 – 23 January 1902) was an Italian painter, mainly of genre and costume genre subjects in oil and watercolor, in addition to portraits. He is now best known for his engravings about Roman antiquities.

== Biography ==
He was born in Ascoli Piceno and studied at the Accademia di San Luca. He was commissioned by the Prussian Archaeological Institute to illustrate using chromolithography the antiquities of Rome and the Lazio. He made plates depicting the Tombs of Via Latina, outside Porta San Giovanni; the frescoes from the palazzo dei Cesari, and those found in Corneto Tarquinia. He spent months in the Catacomb of Callixtus, outside of Porta San Sebastiano, working under candle-light and drawing sepulchral inscriptions and murals of the first Christians. Many of these drawings made it into the publication on the illustrated book on the Catacombs by the Christian archeologist Giovanni Battista de Rossi. Mariani also made many lithographic designs for the Bulletin of the Roman Archeological Commission. He died in Rome.
