= Tombs of Via Latina =

Archaeological site in the southeast suburbs of Rome, Italy

Tombs of the Via Latina
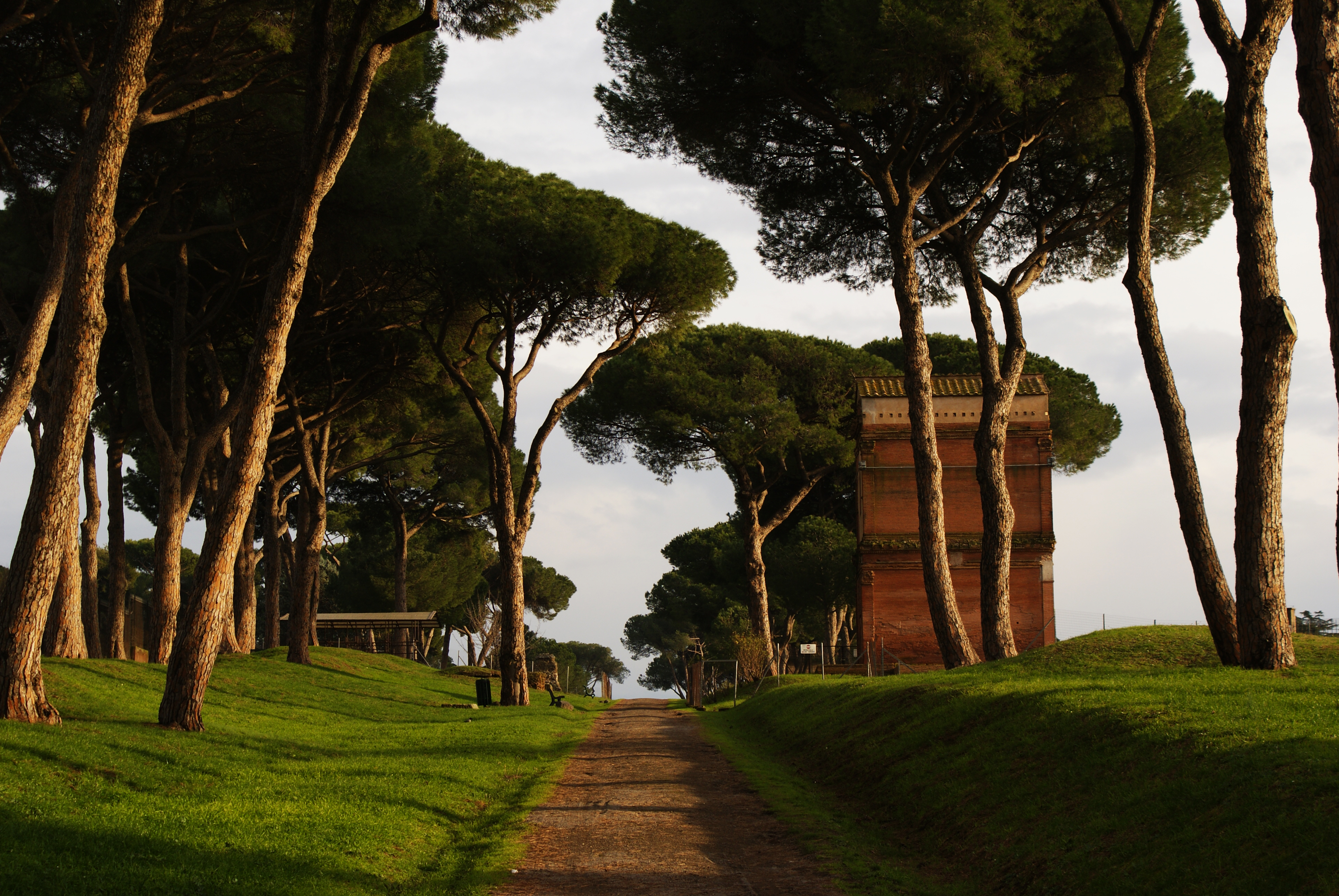
- The Roman road through the Tombs of Via Latina
- Interactive map of Tombs of the Via Latina
- 41°51′43″N 12°32′07″E

The Tombs of the Via Latina (Italian: Tombe di Via Latina) are Roman tombs, mainly from the 2nd century AD, that are found along a short stretch of the Via Latina, an ancient Roman road close to Rome, Italy. They are now part of an archaeological park and can be visited.

== History ==
The tombs were discovered in 1857–58 by Lorenzo Fortunati, a teacher who dabbled in archaeology and made money by selling some of the items he found. A series of excavations supported by Pope Pius IX subsequently uncovered various tombs along a short stretch of the road about 6 km southeast of the center of Rome. The area was subsequently expropriated from the Barberini family by the Italian State in 1879. In 1900, further excavations were initiated under the supervision of Rodolfo Lanciani.

== The Archaeological Park ==
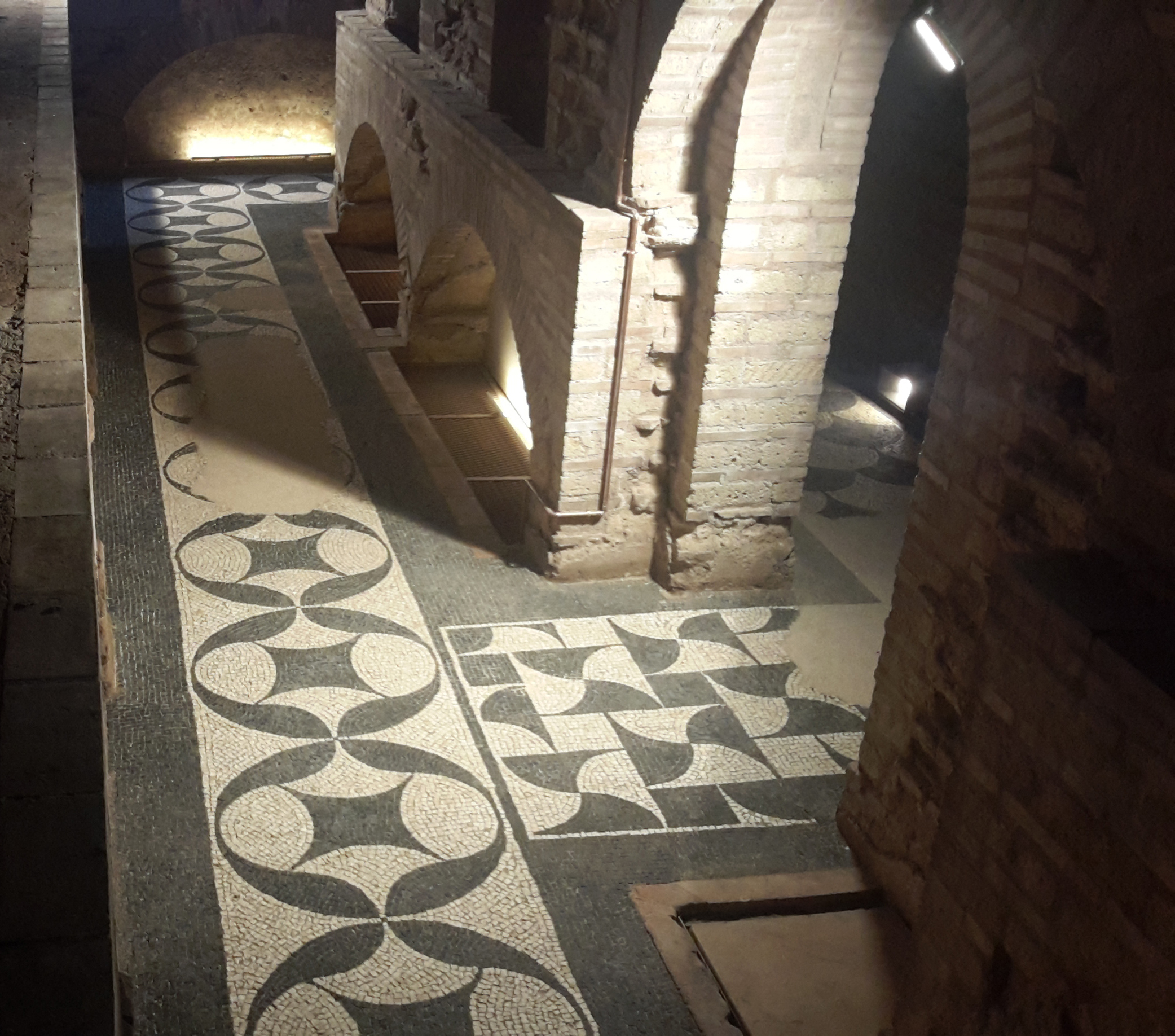
Barberini tomb

The park extends for a short distance of 450 m. In addition to the tombs, part of the original basalt surface of the Via Latina is also visible.

The tombs are very well preserved. Among the most notable is the Barberini tomb (Italian: Sepolcro Barberini), named after the former landowners. It has two floors above an underground burial chamber, and is constructed in red and yellow bricks, typical of Roman construction in the area in the mid 2nd century AD. The Barberini sarcophagus with reliefs representing the myths of Protesilaus and Laodamia was discovered here, and is now on display in the Vatican Museum. The tomb was used as a barn in the 8th century, when part of the roof was demolished.

=== Tomb of the Valerii ===
The Tomb of the Valerii (Italian: Sepolcro dei Valeri), which dates from the second half of the 2nd century AD, is a notable two-story brick structure. Its name is arbitrary and does not relate to the original occupants of the tomb. The part above ground has been almost entirely reconstructed and is noteworthy for a portico with two columns at the front. Beyond the entrance there is an area open to the sky from where two symmetrical staircases lead to the two underground burial chambers, which were originally richly decorated with slabs of marble.

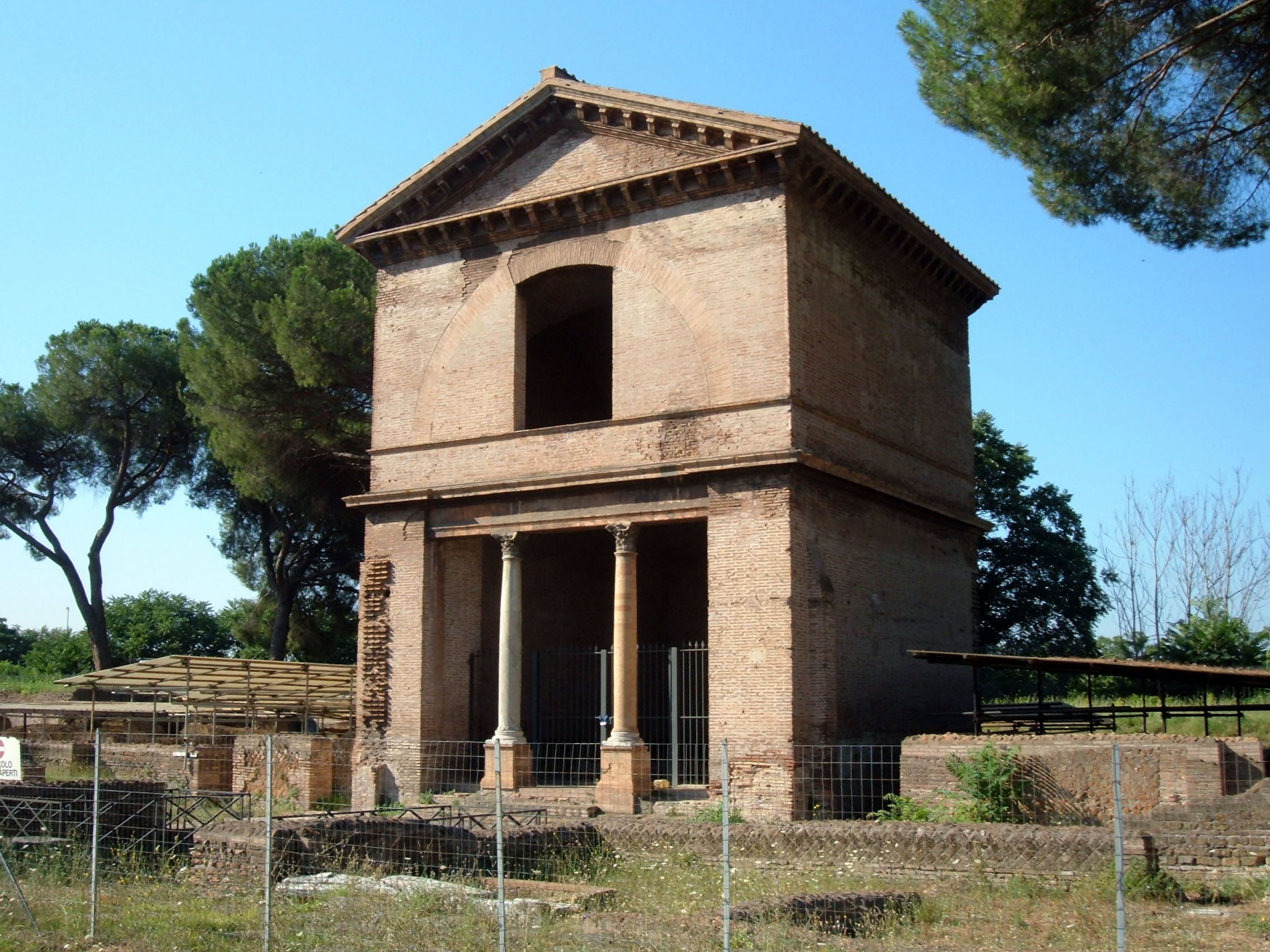

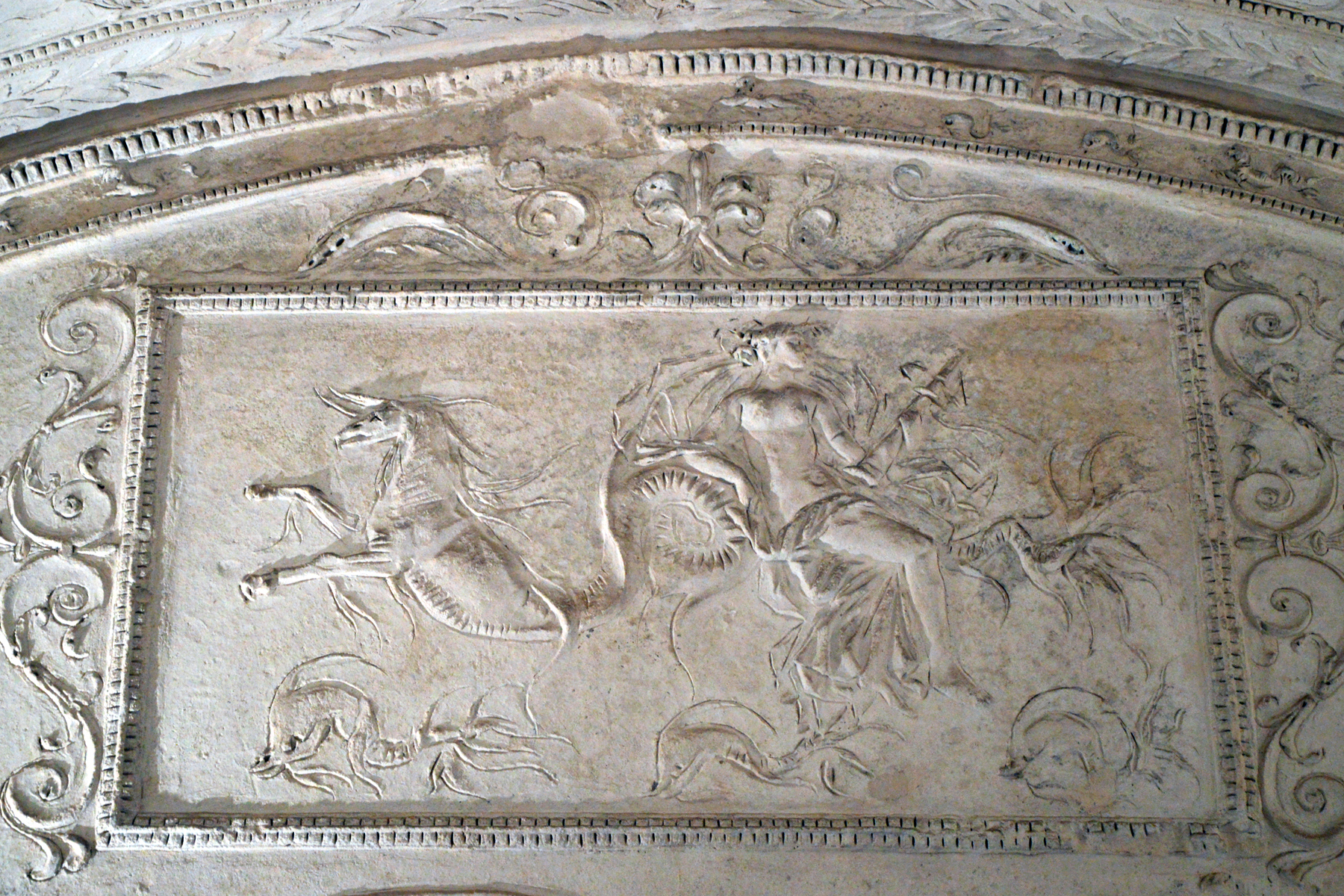

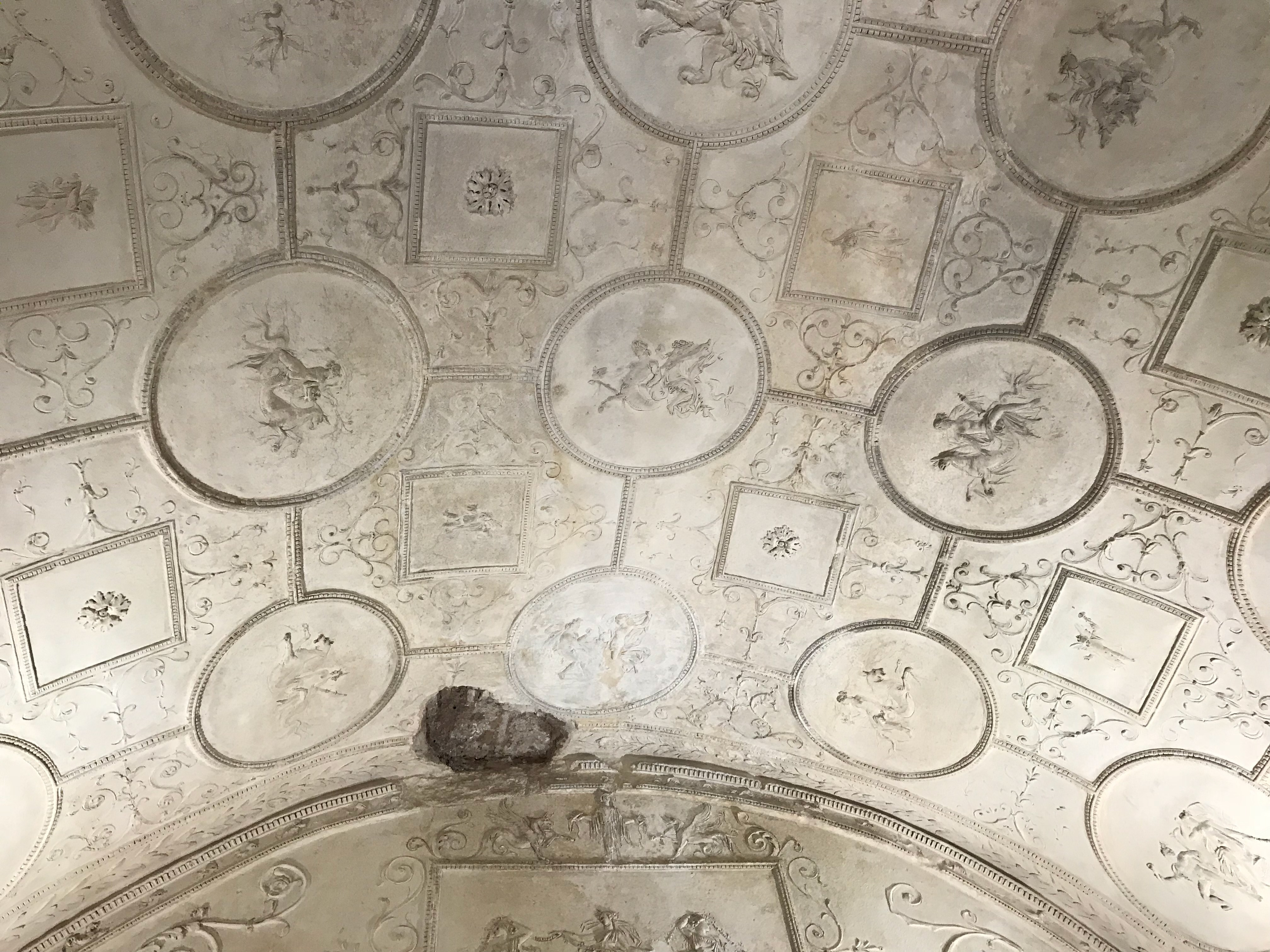

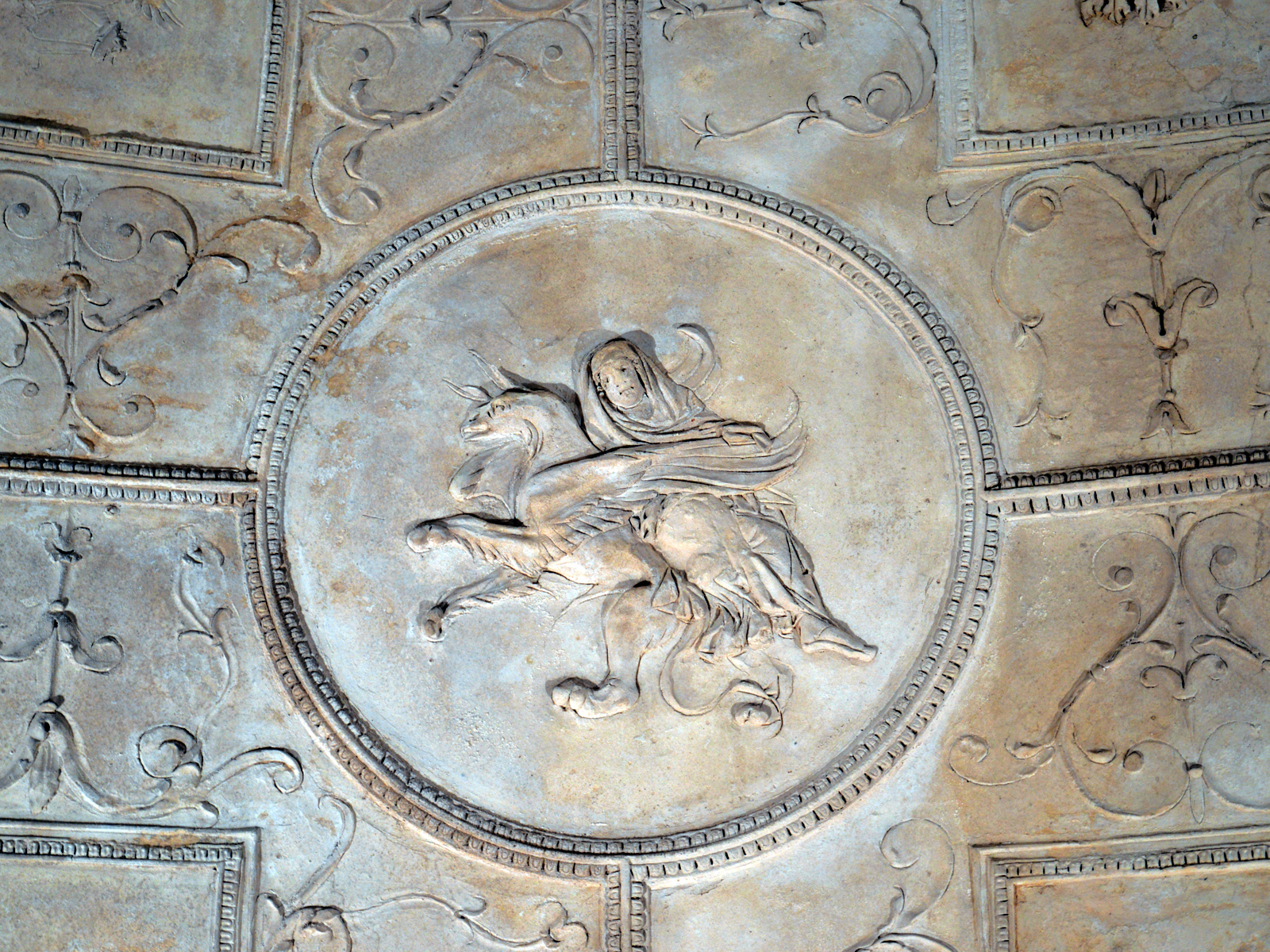

=== Tomb of the Pancratii ===
Only the underground part of the Tomb of the Pancratii (Italian: Sepolcro dei Pancrazi) survives, and the tomb is now covered with a modern building. The name comes from an inscription referring to the funerary collegium of the Pancratii, inscribed on a large marble sarcophagus that remains in situ; seven other sarcophagi found here are now in the Vatican Museum. The tomb, dated to the reign of Hadrian (AD 117–138), contains good examples of stucco work and frescoes. The fresco decoration of the underground vault include Jupiter in flight with the eagle, the Judgement of Paris.

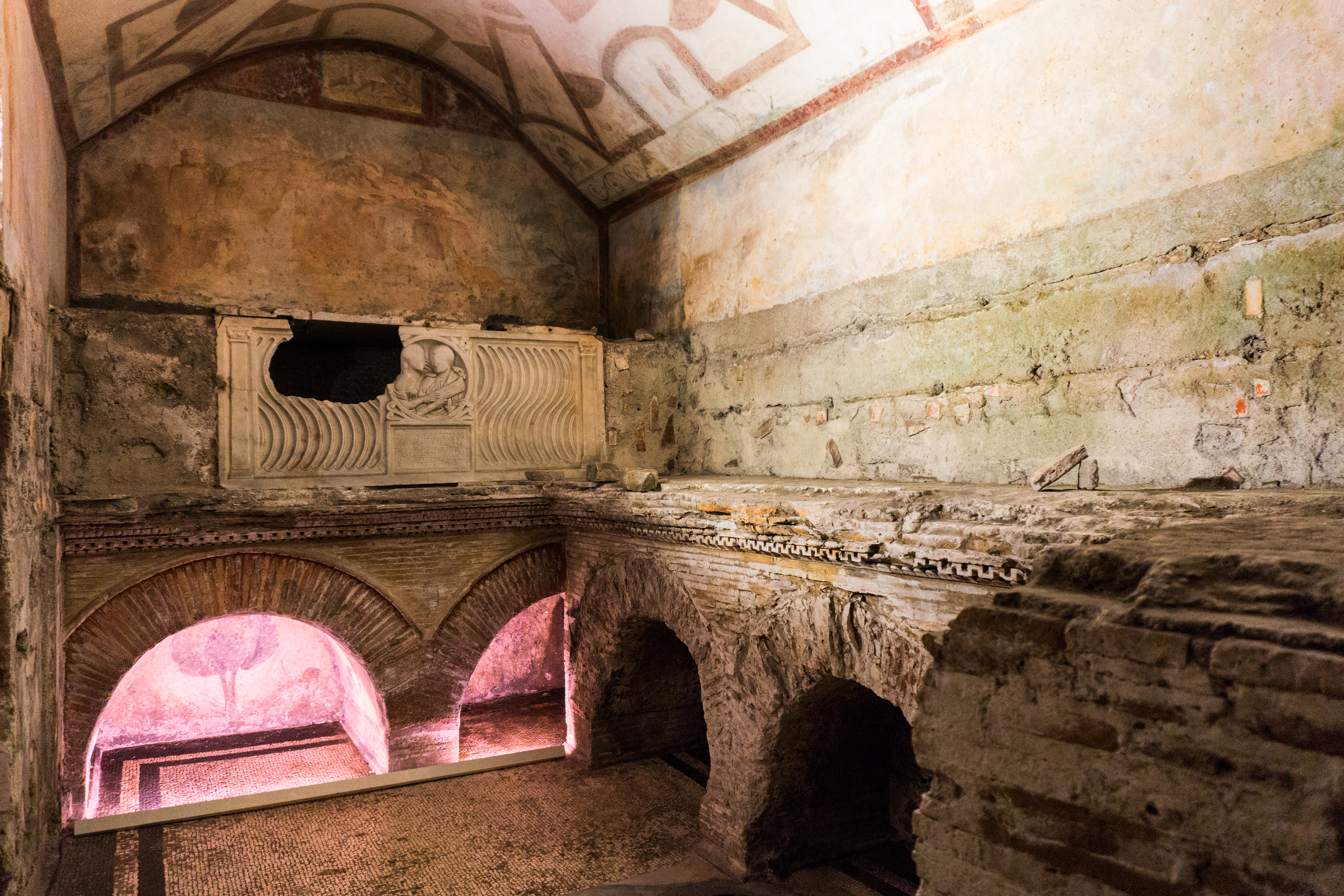

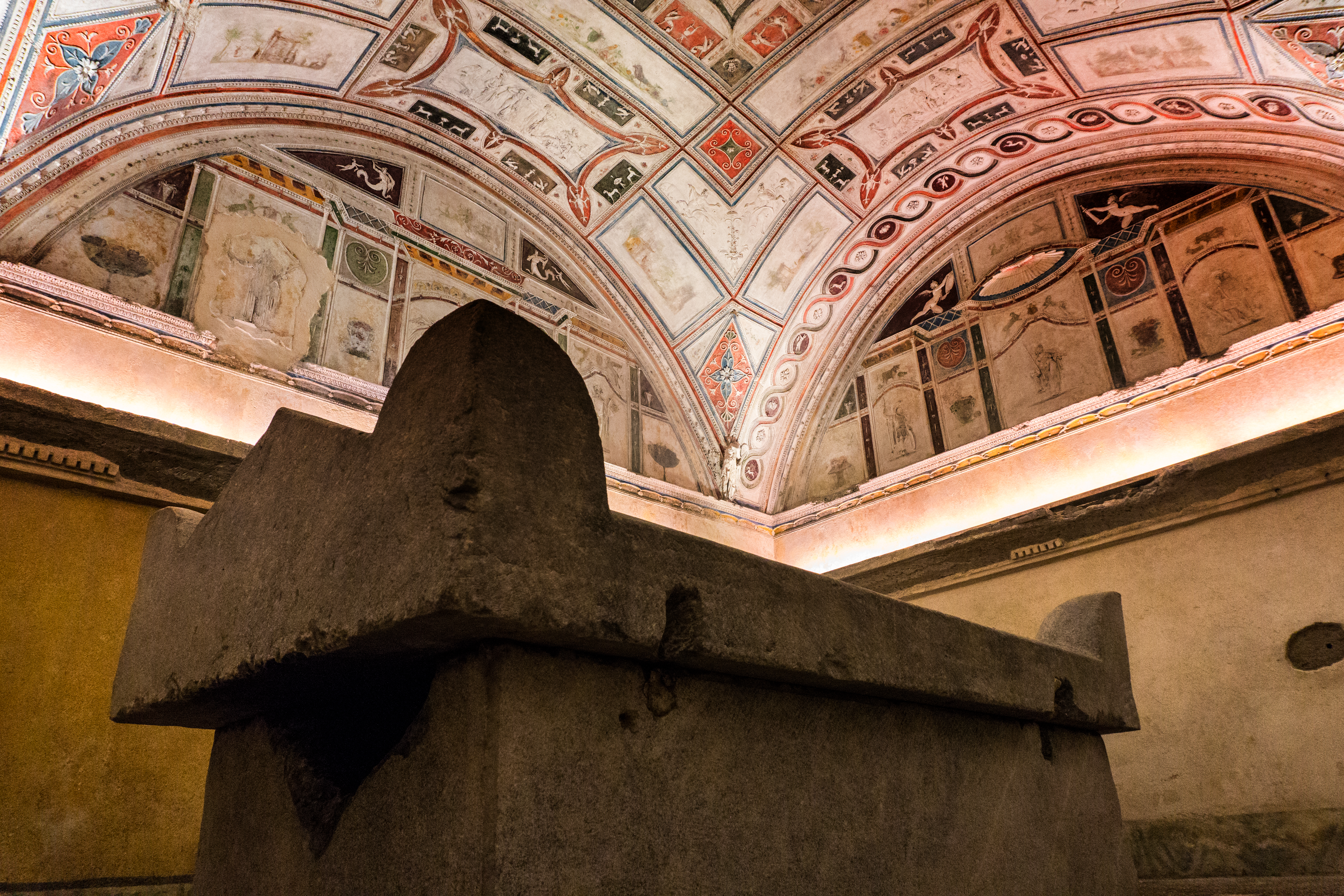

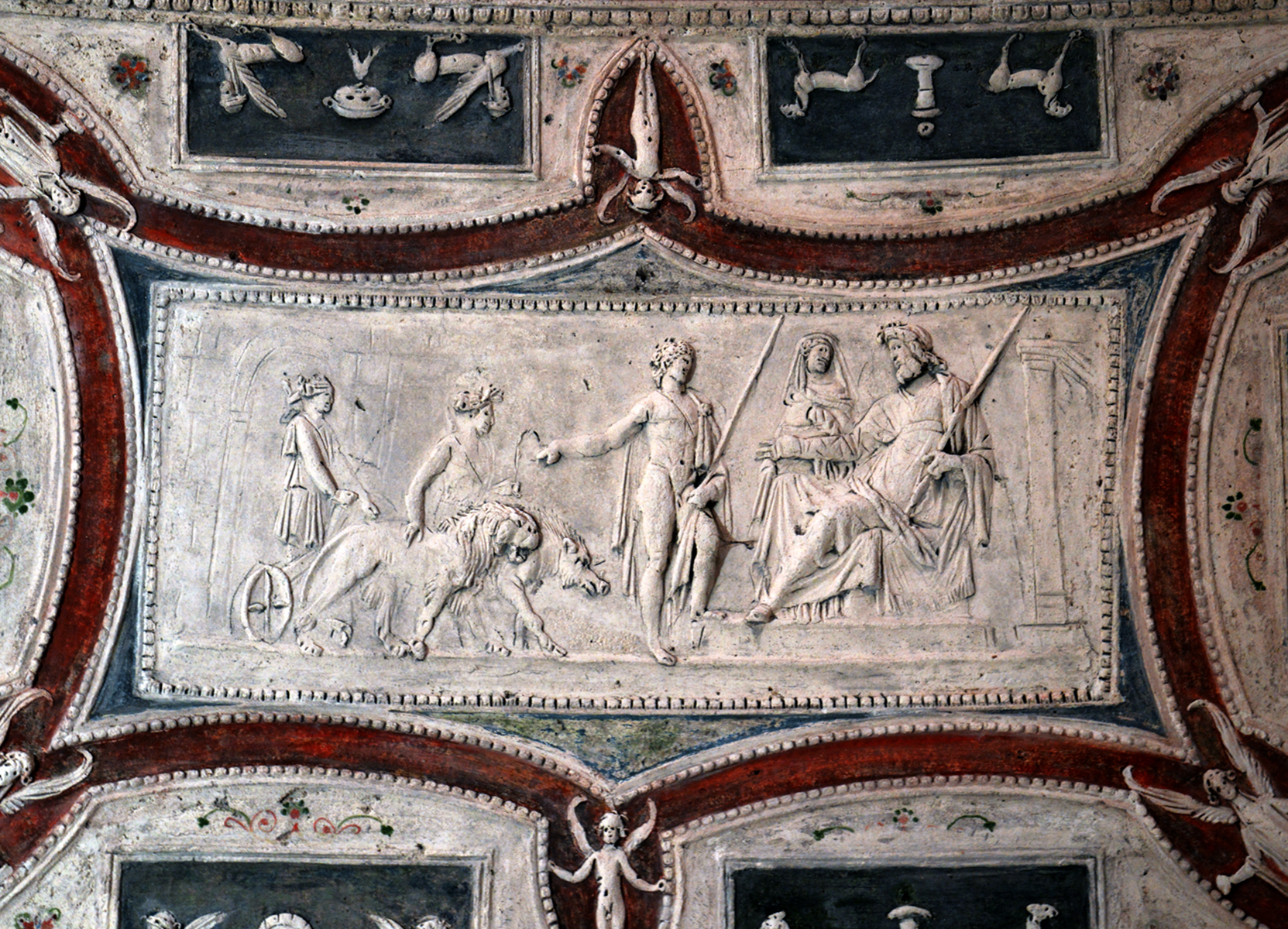

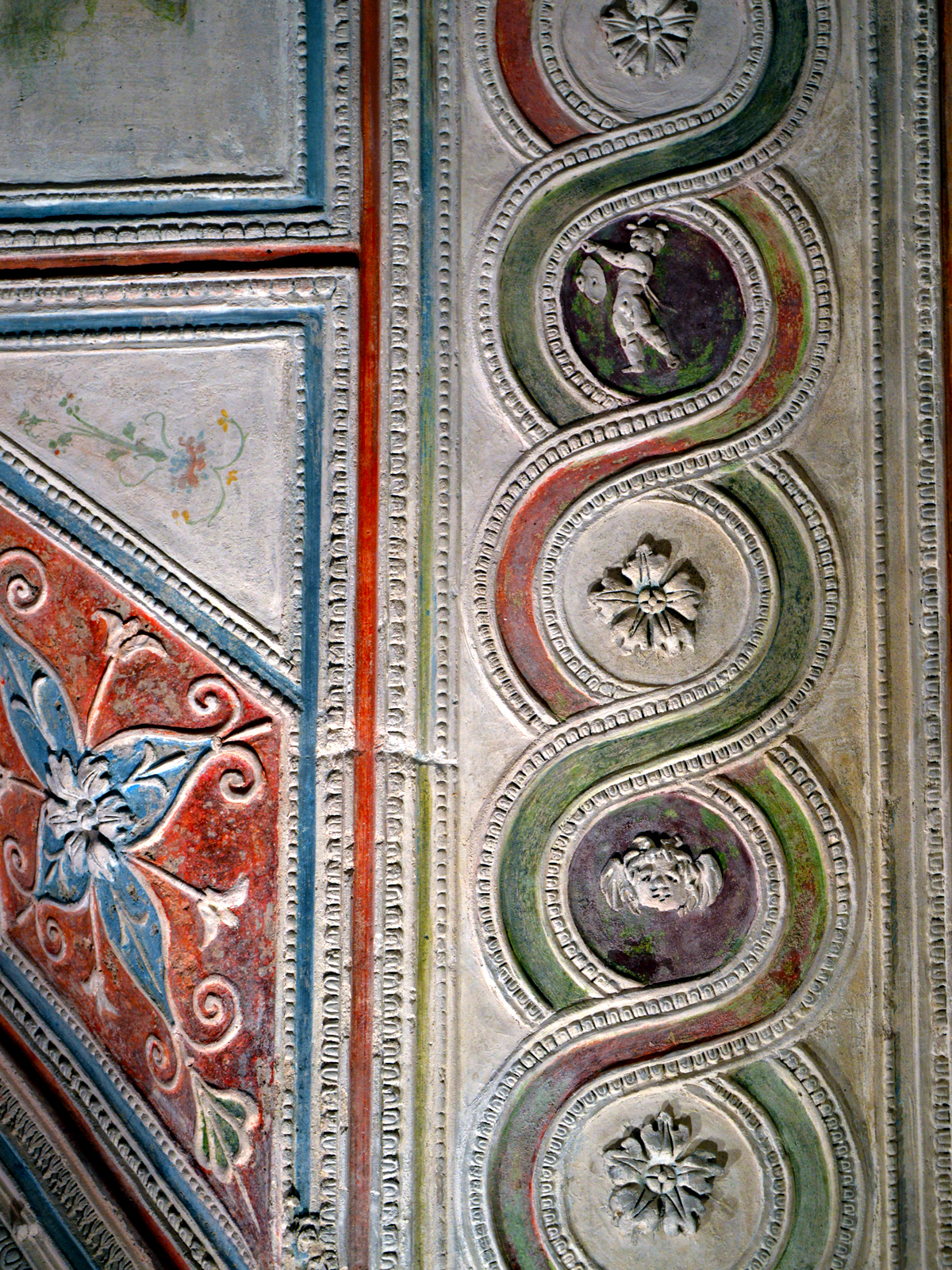

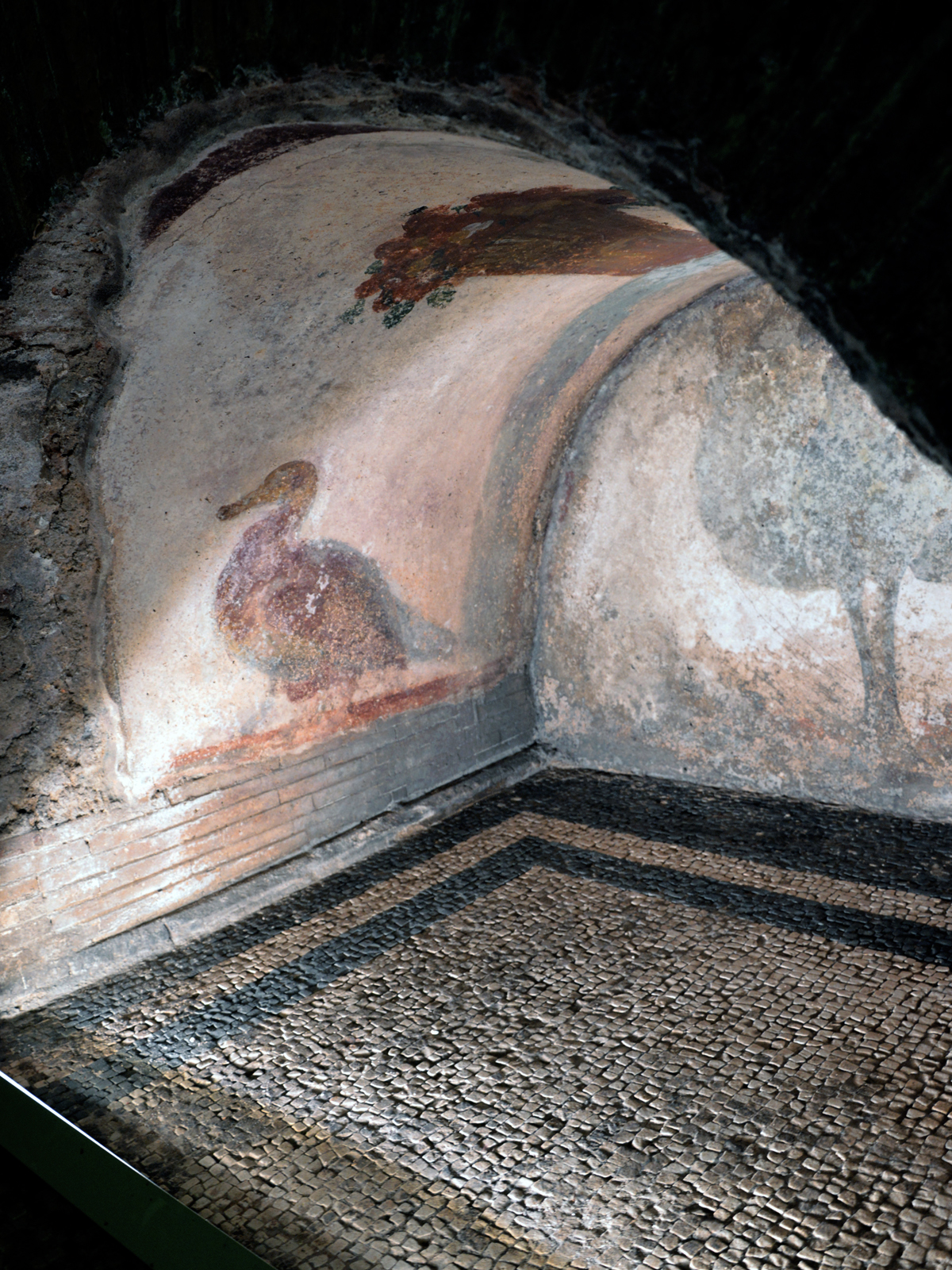

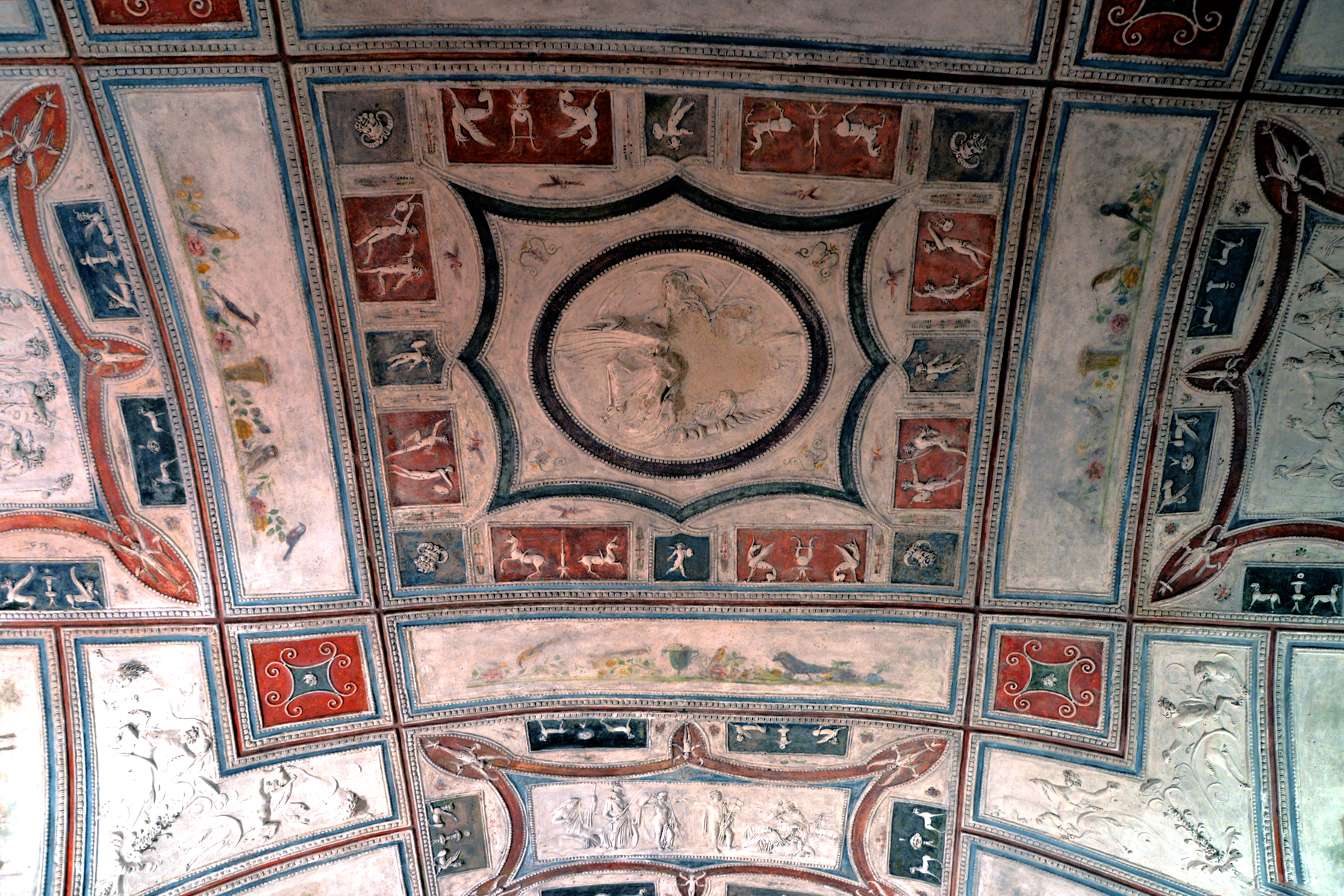

Preceded by Tomb of the Scipios	Landmarks of Rome; Tombs of Via Latina	Succeeded by Tomb of Priscilla
