= Appian Way =

Ancient Roman road

- Via Appia
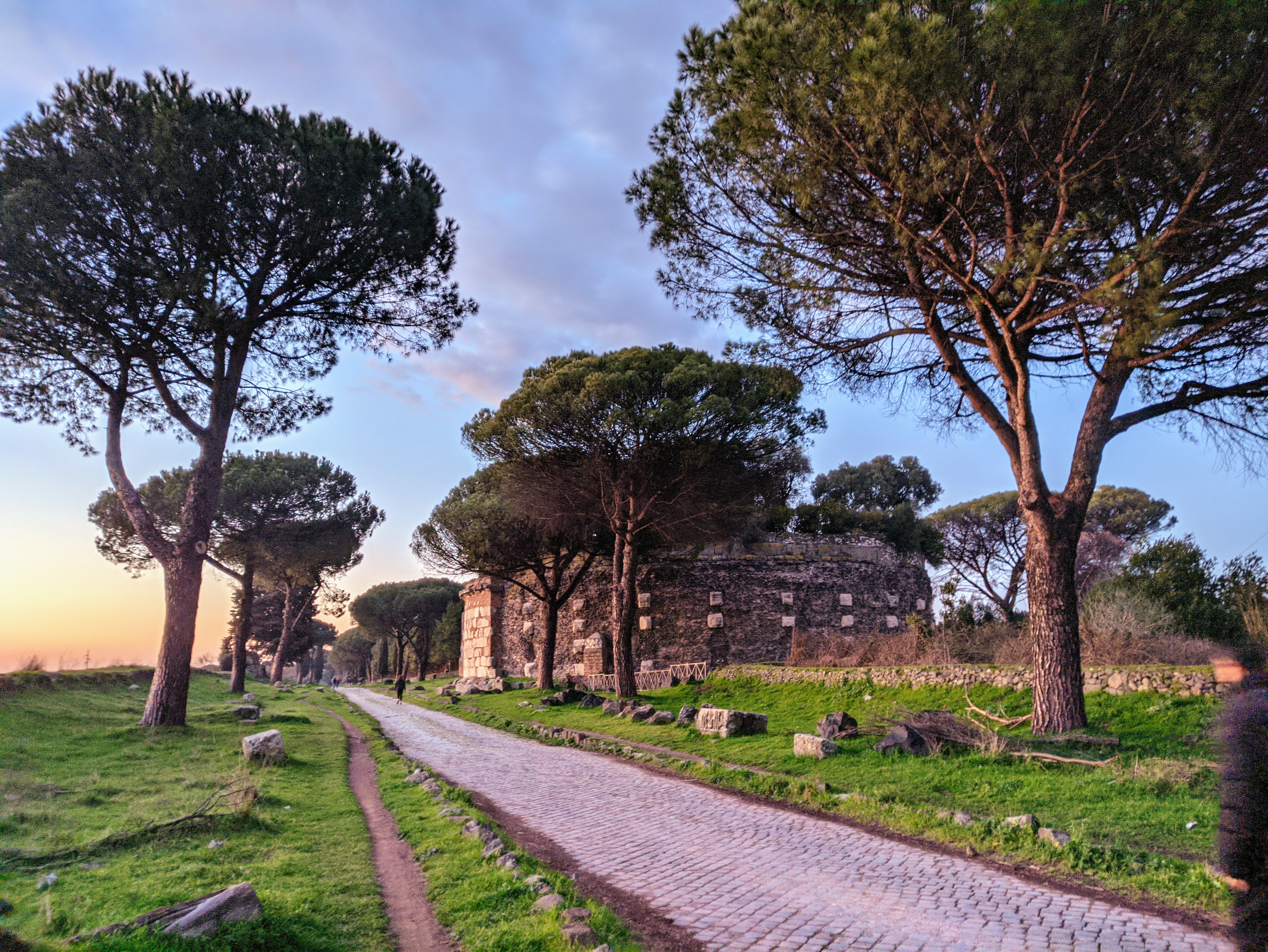
- Section of the Regional Park, Rome
- Click on the map for a fullscreen view
- 41°50′29″N 12°31′57″E
- Type: Roman road
- Location: Roman Forum, Rome to Brindisi

History
- Built: 312–244 BC
- Built by: Appius Claudius Caecus, addition by Trajan (Via Appia Traiana)

Site notes
- Length: 335.5 miles (540 km)
- Website: www.camminodellappia.it

UNESCO World Heritage Site
- Official name: Via Appia. Regina Viarum
- Type: Cultural
- Criteria: iii, iv, vi
- Designated: 2024
- Reference no.: 1708
- Region: Southern Europe

The Appian Way, also known by its Latin and Italian name, Via Appia, is one of the earliest and strategically most important Roman roads of the ancient republic. It connected Rome to Brindisi, in southeast Italy. Its importance is indicated by its common name, recorded by Statius, of Appia longarum... regina viarum ('the Appian Way, the queen of the long roads'). The road is named after Appius Claudius Caecus, the Roman censor who, during the Samnite Wars, began and completed the first section as a military road to the south in 312 BC.

In July 2024, the Appian Way entered the UNESCO World Heritage List.

== Origins ==
=== Development ===
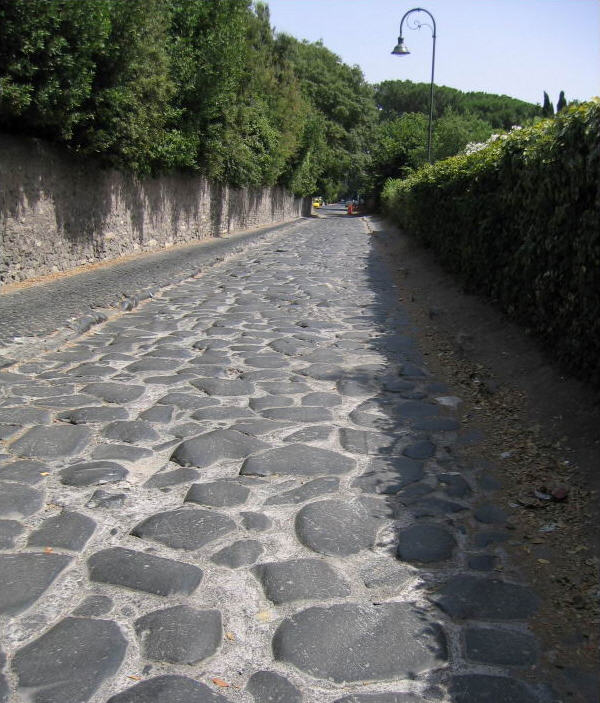
Near Rome

The Appian Way was a Roman road that the Republic used as a main route for military supplies for its conquest of southern Italy in 312 BC and for improvements in communication.

The Appian Way — essential to the Romans — was the first long road built specifically to transport troops outside the smaller region of greater Rome. The few roads outside the early city were Etruscan and went mainly to Etruria.

=== The Samnite Wars ===
Romans had an affinity for the people of Campania, who, like themselves, traced their backgrounds to the Etruscans. The Samnite Wars were instigated by the Samnites when Rome attempted to ally itself with the city of Capua in Campania. The Italic speakers in Latium had long ago been subdued and incorporated into the Roman state. They were responsible for changing Rome from a primarily Etruscan to a primarily Italic state.

Dense populations of sovereign Samnites remained in the mountains north of Capua, which is just north of the Greek city of Neapolis. Around 343 BC, Rome and Capua attempted to form an alliance. The Samnites reacted with military force.

=== The barrier of the Pontine Marshes ===
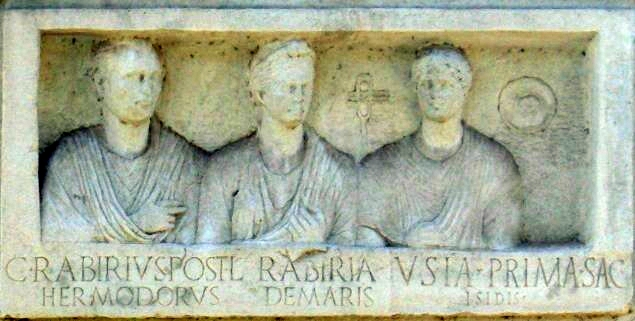
Grave monument of Caius Rabirius Postumus Hermodorus, Lucia Rabiria Demaris and Usia Prima, priestess of Isis along the Via Appia, near Quarto Miglio

Between Capua and Rome lay the Pontine Marshes (Pomptinae paludes), a swamp infested with malaria. A tortuous coastal road wound between Ostia at the mouth of the Tiber and Neapolis. The Via Latina followed its ancient and scarcely more accessible path along the foothills of Monti Laziali and Monti Lepini, which are visible towering over the former marsh.

In the First Samnite War (343–341 BC) the Romans found they could not support or resupply troops in the field against the Samnites across the marsh. A revolt of the Latin League drained their resources further. They gave up the attempted alliance and settled with Samnium.

=== Colonization to the southeast ===
The Romans were only biding their time while they looked for a solution. The first answer was the colonia, a "cultivation" of settlers from Rome, who would maintain a permanent base of operations. The Second Samnite War (327–304 BC) erupted when Rome attempted to place a colony at Cales in 334 BC and again at Fregellae in 328 BC on the other side of the marshes. The Samnites, now a major power after defeating the Greeks of Tarentum, occupied Neapolis to try to ensure its loyalty. The Neapolitans appealed to Rome, which sent an army and expelled the Samnites from Neapolis.

=== Appius Claudius' beginning of the works ===
In 312 BC, Appius Claudius Caecus became censor at Rome. He was of the gens Claudia, who were patricians descended from the Sabines taken into the early Roman state. He had been given the name of the founding ancestor of the gens, Appius Claudius (Attus Clausus in Sabine). He was a populist, i.e., an advocate of the common people. A man of discernment and perception, in the years of success he was said to have lost his eyesight and thus acquired the name caecus, 'blind'. In antique literature, blindness was sometimes associated with great vision, cf. Homer.

Without waiting to be told what to do by the Senate, Appius Claudius began bold public works to address the supply problem. An aqueduct (the Aqua Appia) secured the water supply of the city of Rome. By far the best known project was the road, which ran across the Pontine Marshes to the coast northwest of Naples, where it turned north to Capua. On it, any number of fresh troops could be sped to the theatre of operations, and supplies could be moved en masse to Roman bases without hindrance by either enemy or terrain. It is no surprise that, after his term as censor, Appius Claudius became consul twice, subsequently held other offices, and was a respected consultant to the state even during his later years.

=== Success of the road ===
The road achieved its purpose. The outcome of the Second Samnite War was at last favorable to Rome. In a series of blows the Romans reversed their fortunes, bringing Etruria to the table in 311 BC, the very year of their revolt, and Samnium in 304 BC. The road was the main factor that allowed them to concentrate their forces with sufficient rapidity and to keep them adequately supplied, whereafter they became a formidable opponent.

== Construction ==
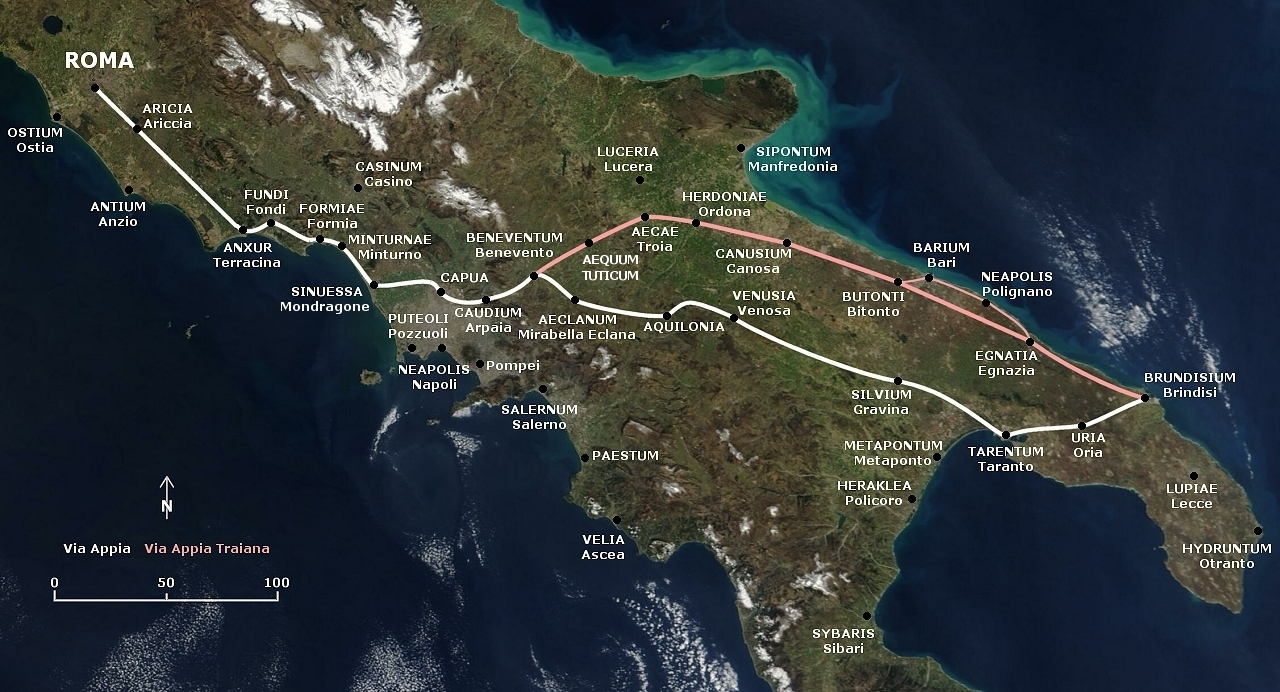
The path of the Via Appia and of the Via Appia Traiana

The main part of the Appian Way was started and completed in 312 BC.

The road began as a leveled dirt path on which small stones and mortar were laid. This base was covered with gravel, and finally topped with tightly fitting, interlocking stones to create a flat and durable surface. The historian Procopius remarked that the stones fit together so securely and precisely that they appeared to have grown together rather than been set by hand. The road was cambered in the middle to allow for water runoff and flanked by ditches on either side, which were protected by retaining walls.

=== Between Rome and Lake Albano ===
The road began in the Forum Romanum, passed through the Servian Wall at the porta Capena, went through a cutting in the clivus Martis, and left the city. For this stretch of the road, the builders used the Via Latina. The building of the Aurelian Wall centuries later required the placing of another gate, the Porta Appia. Outside of Rome the new Via Appia went through well-to-do suburbs along the Via Norba, the ancient track to the Alban Hills, where Norba was situated. The road at the time was a via glarea, a gravel road. The Romans built a high-quality road, with layers of cemented stone over a layer of small stones, cambered, drainage ditches on either side, low retaining walls on sunken portions, and dirt pathways for sidewalks. The Via Appia is believed to have been the first Roman road to feature the use of lime cement. The materials were volcanic rock. The surface was said to have been so smooth that you could not distinguish the joints. The Roman section still exists and is lined with monuments of all periods, although the cement has eroded out of the joints, leaving a very rough surface.

=== Across the marsh ===
The road concedes nothing to the Alban Hills, but goes straight through them over cuts and fills. The gradients are steep. Then it enters the former Pontine Marshes. A stone causeway of about 31 kilometers (19 mi) led across stagnant and foul-smelling pools blocked from the sea by sand dunes. Appius Claudius planned to drain the marsh, taking up earlier attempts, but he failed. The causeway and its bridges subsequently needed constant repair. In 162 BC, Marcus Cornelius Cathegus had a canal constructed along the road to relieve the traffic and provide an alternative when the road was being repaired. Romans preferred using the canal.

=== Along the coast ===
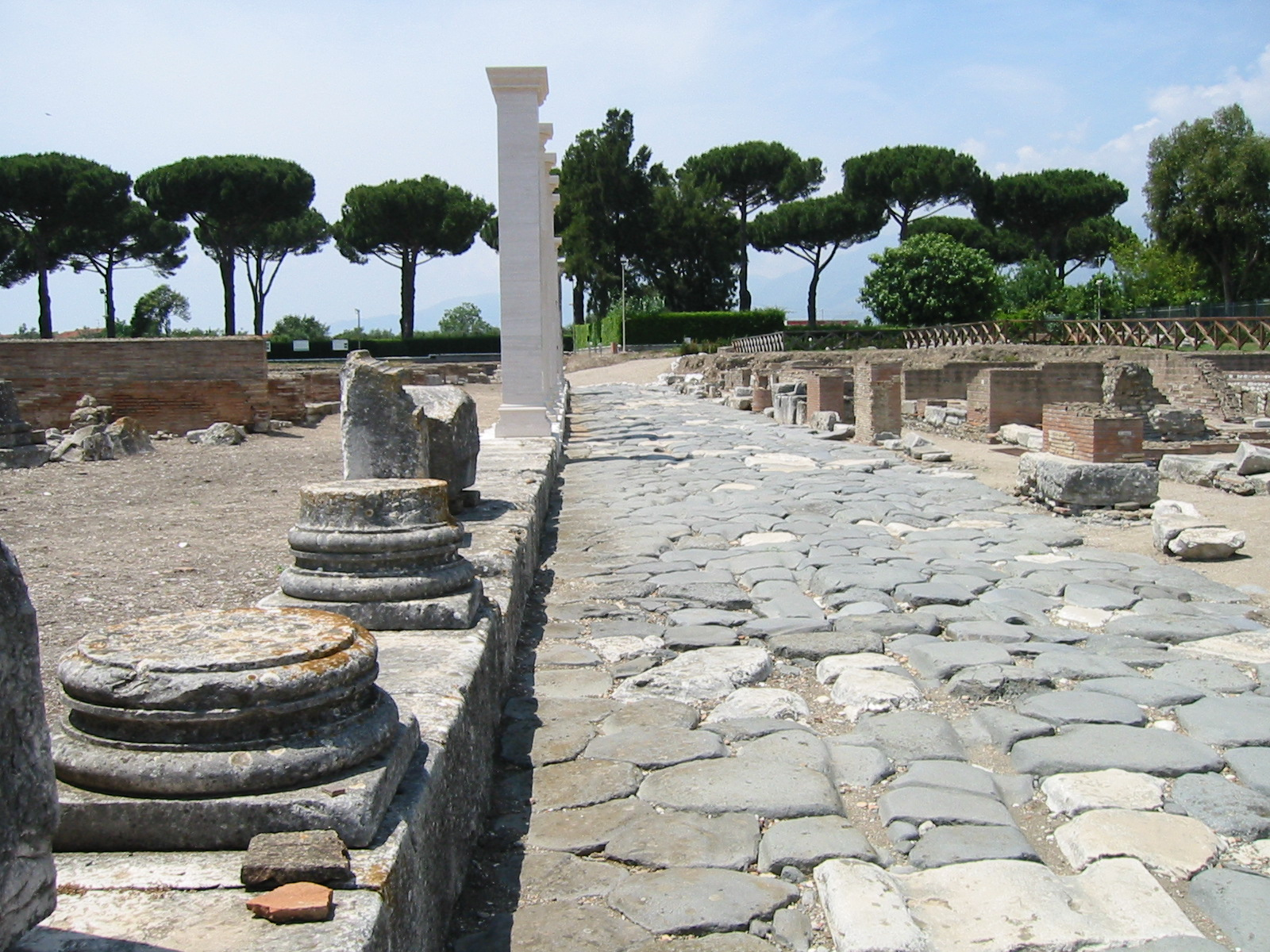
Via Appia within the ancient Minturno

The Via Appia picked up the coastal road at Tarracina (Terracina). However, the Romans straightened it somewhat with cuttings, which form cliffs today. From there the road swerved north to Capua, where, for the time being, it ended. The Caudine Forks were not far to the north. The itinerary was Aricia (Ariccia), Tres Tabernae, Forum Appii, Tarracina, Fundi (Fondi), Formiae (Formia), Minturnae (Minturno), Suessa, Casilinum and Capua, but some of these were colonies added after the Samnite Wars. The length of the Appian Way from Rome to Capua was 132 Roman miles (195.4 kilometers (121.4 mi)) and from Capua to Brindisi (244 BC) it was 233 Roman miles (344.8 km; 214.2 mi). The original road had no milestones, as they were not yet in use. A few survive from later times, including a first milestone near the Porta Appia.

=== Extension to Beneventum ===
The Third Samnite War (298–290 BC) is perhaps misnamed. It was an all-out attempt by all the neighbors of Rome: Italics, Etruscans and Gauls, to check the power of Rome. The Samnites were the leading people of the conspiracy. Rome dealt the northerners a crushing blow at the Battle of Sentinum in Umbria in 295. The Samnites fought on alone. Rome now placed 13 colonies in Campania and Samnium. It must have been during this time that they extended the Via Appia 35 miles beyond Capua past the Caudine Forks to a place the Samnites called Maloenton, "passage of the flocks". The itinerary added Calatia, Caudium and Beneventum (not yet called that). Here also ended the Via Latina.

=== Extension to Apulia and Calabria ===
By 290 BC, the sovereignty of the Samnites had ended. The heel of Italy lay open to the Romans. The dates are somewhat uncertain and there is considerable variation in the sources, but during the Third Samnite War the Romans seem to have extended the road to Venusia, where they placed a colony of 20,000 men. After that they were at Tarentum.

Roman expansion alarmed Tarentum, the leading city of the Greek presence (Magna Graecia) in southern Italy. They hired the mercenary King Pyrrhus of Epirus in neighboring Greece to fight the Romans on their behalf. In 280 BC the Romans suffered a defeat at the hands of Pyrrhus at the Battle of Heraclea on the coast west of Tarentum. The battle was costly for both sides, prompting Pyrrhus to remark "One more such victory and I am lost." Making the best of it, the Roman army turned on Greek Rhegium and effected a massacre of Pyrrhian partisans there.

Rather than pursue them, Pyrrhus went straight for Rome along the Via Appia and then the Via Latina. He knew that if he continued on the Via Appia he could be trapped in the marsh. Wary of such entrapment on the Via Latina also, he withdrew without fighting after encountering opposition at Anagni. Wintering in Campania, he withdrew to Apulia in 279 BC, where, pursued by the Romans, he won a second costly victory at the Battle of Asculum. Withdrawing from Apulia for a Sicilian interlude, he returned to Apulia in 275 BC and started for Campania up the Roman road.

Supplied by that same road, the Romans successfully defended the region against Pyrrhus, crushing his army in a two-day fight at the Battle of Beneventum in 275 BC. The Romans renamed the town from "Maleventum" ("site of bad events") to Beneventum ("site of good events") as a result. Pyrrhus withdrew to Greece, where he died in a street fight in Argos in 272 BC. Tarentum fell to the Romans that same year, who proceeded to consolidate their rule over all of Italy.

The Romans pushed the Via Appia to the port of Brundisium in 264 BC. The itinerary from Beneventum was now Aeculanum, Forum Aemilii, Venusia, Silvium, Tarentum, Uria and Brundisium. The Roman Republic was the government of Italy, for the time being. Appius Claudius died in 273, but in extending the road a number of times, no one has tried to displace his name upon it.

==== Rediscovery ====
The Appian Way's path across today's regions Lazio and Campania has always been well known, but the exact position of the part located in Apulia (the original one, not the extension by Trajan) was long unknown, since there were no visible remains of the Appian Way in that region.

In the first half of the 20th century, the professor of ancient Roman topography Giuseppe Lugli managed to discover, with the then-innovative technique of photogrammetry, what probably was the route of the Appian Way from Gravina in Puglia (Silvium) up to Taranto. When analysing aerophotogrammetric shots of the area, Lugli noticed a path (Italian: tratturo) named la Tarantina, whose direction was still largely influenced by the centuriation; this, according to Lugli, was the path of the Appian Way. This path, as well as the part located in today's Apulia region, was still in use in the Middle Ages. A further piece of evidence for Lugli's proposed path is the presence of a number of archaeological remains in that region, among them the ancient settlement of Jesce.

By studying the distances given in the Antonine Itinerary, Lugli also assigned the Appian Way stations Blera and Sublupatia (which also occurs on the Tabula Peutingeriana) respectively to the areas Murgia Catena and Taverna (between masseria (estate farmhouse) S. Filippo and masseria S. Pietro). However, the toponym Murgia Catena defined too large an area, not allowing a clear localization of the Appian Way station. More recently Luciano Piepoli, based on the distances given in the Antonine Itinerary and on newer archeological findings, has suggested that Silvium should be Santo Staso, an area very close to Gravina in Puglia, Blera should be masseria Castello, and Sublupatia should be masseria Caione.

=== Main branches ===
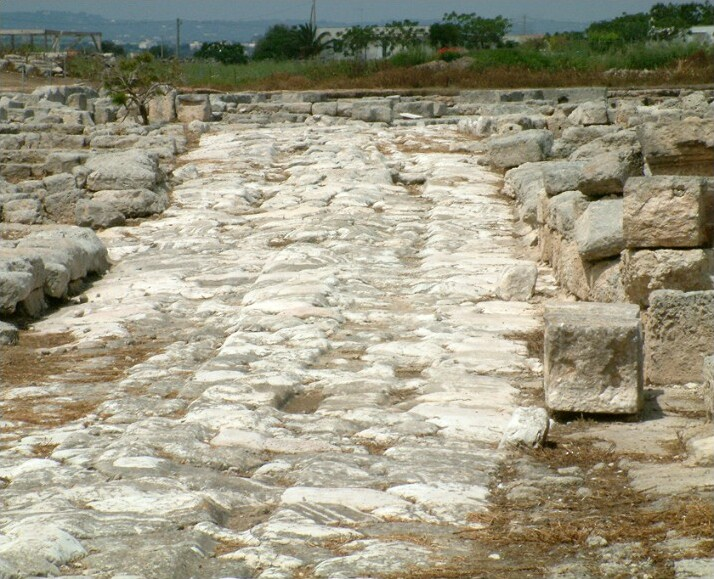
Emperor Trajan built a deviation of Via Appia. This is a tract of Via Appia Traiana near Egnatia.

Since the latter stretch of the Appian Way turned out to be very impervious, some branches were created: first the Via Aemilia, then the Via Minucia, finally the emperor Trajan built the Via Traiana, a branch of the Via Appia from Beneventum, reaching Brundisium via Canusium and Barium rather than via Tarentum. This was commemorated by an arch at Beneventum.

Travellers could cross the Adriatic Sea through the Otranto Strait towards Albania either by landing at present day Durrës through the Via Egnatia or near the ancient town of Apollonia and continue towards present day Rrogozhinë in central Albania.

== Notable historical events along the road ==
=== Crucifixion of Spartacus's army ===
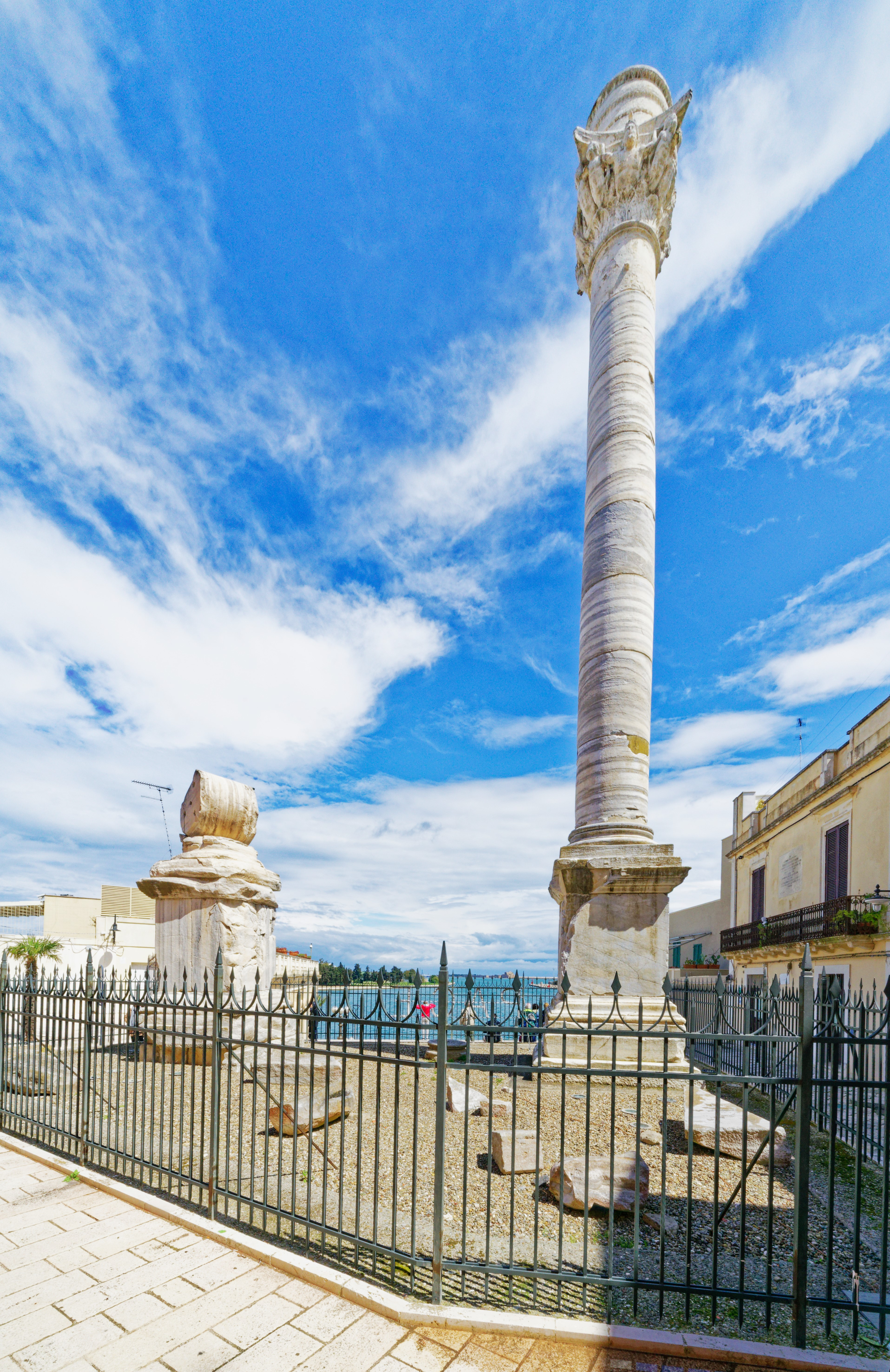
The column in Brindisi, marking the end of the Via Appia

In 73 BC, a slave revolt (known as the Third Servile War) under the ex-gladiator of Capua, Spartacus, began against the Romans. Slaves accounted for roughly every third person in Italy.

Spartacus defeated many Roman armies in a conflict that lasted for over two years. While trying to escape from Italy at Brundisium he unwittingly moved his forces into the historic trap at Apulia in Calabria. The Romans were well acquainted with the region. Legions were brought home from abroad and Spartacus was pinned between armies. The ex-slave army was defeated at the Siler River by Marcus Licinius Crassus. Pompey's armies captured and killed several thousand rebels that escaped from the battle and Crassus captured several thousand more. The Romans judged that the slaves had forfeited their right to live. In 71 BC, 6,000 slaves were crucified along the 200-kilometer (120 mi) Via Appia from Rome to Capua.

=== World War II, Battle of Anzio ===
In 1943, during World War II, the Allies fell into the same trap Pyrrhus had retreated to avoid, in the Pomptine fields, the successor to the Pontine Marshes. The marsh remained, despite many efforts to drain it, until engineers working for Benito Mussolini finally succeeded (even so, the fields were infested with malarial mosquitos until the advent of DDT in the 1950s).

Hoping to break a stalemate at Monte Cassino, the Allies landed on the coast of Italy at the Anzio-Nettuno area – ancient Antium – which was midway between Ostia and Terracina. They found that the place was undefended. They intended to move along the line of the Via Appia to take Rome, outflanking Monte Cassino, but they did not do so quickly enough. The Germans occupied Mounts Laziali and Lepini along the track of the old Via Latina, from which they rained down shells on Anzio. Even though the Allies expanded into all the Pomptine region, they gained no ground. The Germans counterattacked down the via Appia from the Alban hills in a front four miles wide, but could not retake Anzio. The battle lasted for four months, one side being supplied by sea, the other by land through Rome. In May 1944, the Allies broke out of Anzio and took Rome. The German forces escaped to the north of Florence.

=== 1960 Summer Olympics ===
During the 1960 Summer Olympics, the Via Appia was part of the course of the men's marathon. The event was won by Abebe Bikila of Ethiopia.

== Main sights ==
=== Via Appia Antica ===
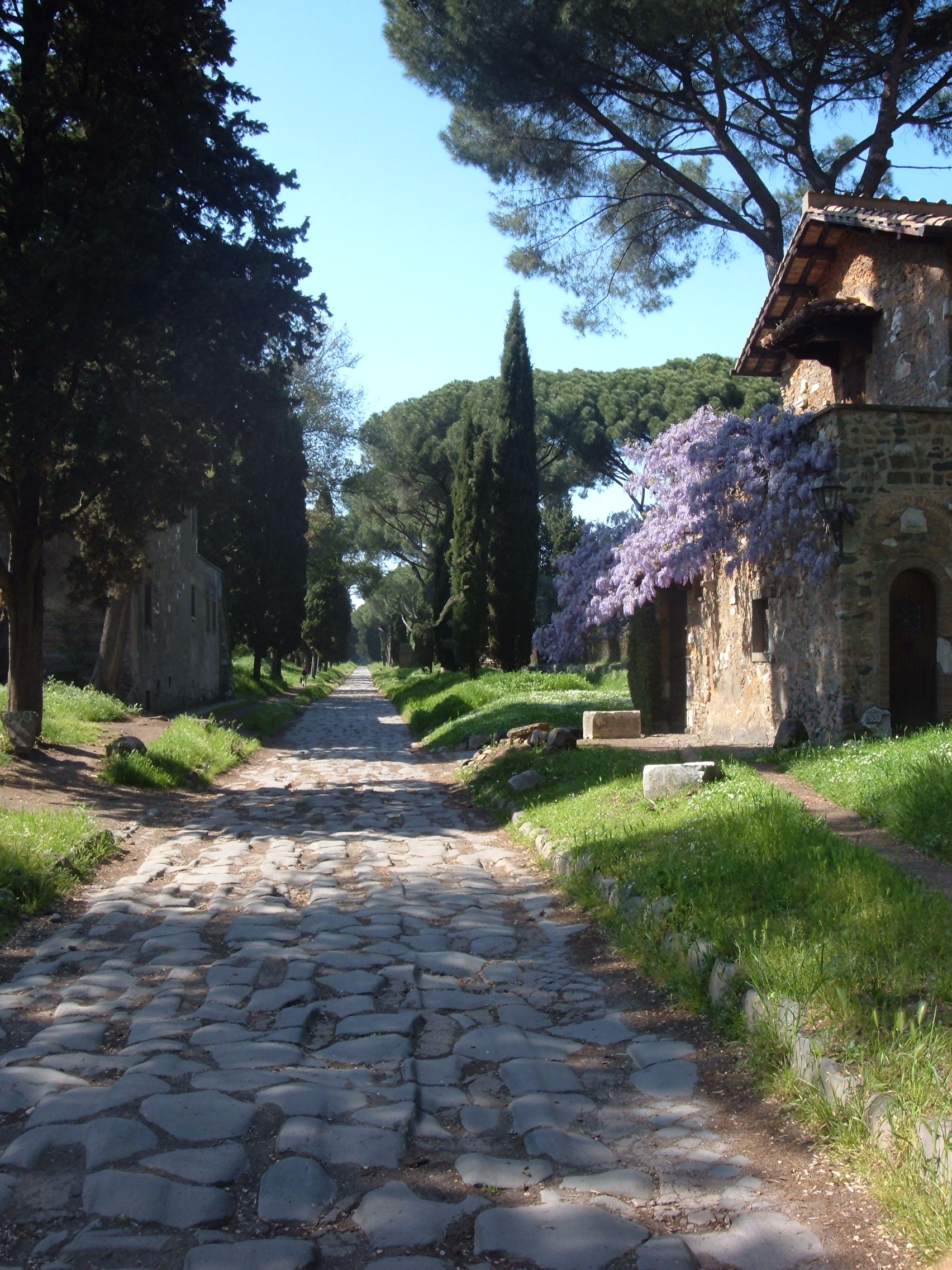
Via Appia Antica 4.1 km southeast from Porta Appia (Porta San Sebastiano), the gate of the Aurelian Walls

After the fall of the Western Roman Empire, the road fell out of use; Pope Pius VI ordered its restoration. A new Appian Way was built in parallel with the old one in 1784 as far as the Alban Hills region. The new road is the Via Appia Nuova ('New Appian Way') as opposed to the old section, now known as Via Appia Antica. The old Appian Way close to Rome is now a free tourist attraction. It was extensively restored for Rome's Millennium and Great Jubilee celebrations. The first 5 kilometers (3 mi) are still heavily used by cars, buses and coaches but from then on traffic is very light and the ruins can be explored on foot in relative safety. The Church of Domine Quo Vadis is in the second mile of the road. Along or close to the part of the road closest to Rome, there are three catacombs of Roman and early Christian origin and one of Jewish origin.

The construction of Rome's ring road, the Grande Raccordo Anulare or GRA, in 1951 caused the Appian Way to be cut in two. More recent improvements to the GRA have rectified this through the construction of a tunnel under the Appia, so that it is now possible to follow the Appia on foot for about 16 km (10 mi) from its beginning near the Baths of Caracalla.

Many parts of the original road beyond Rome's environs have been preserved, and some are now used by cars (for example, in the area of Velletri). The road inspires the last movement of Ottorino Respighi's Pini di Roma. To this day the Via Appia contains the longest stretch of straight road in Europe, totaling 62 km (39 mi).

=== Monuments along the Via Appia ===
==== 1st to 4th mile ====
- Porta Appia (Porta San Sebastiano), the gate of the Aurelian Walls
- Church of Domine Quo Vadis
- Tomb of Priscilla
- Catacomb of Callixtus
- Hypogeum of Vibia
- San Sebastiano fuori le mura
- Catacombs of St Sebastian
- Vigna Randanini Jewish catacombs
- Circus of Maxentius
- Tomb of Caecilia Metella
- Roman baths of Capo di Bove
- Tomb of Hilarus Fuscus

==== 5th mile ====
- Mausoleum of the Orazi and Curiazi
- Villa dei Quintili, with nympheum, theatre, and baths
- Mausoleum of Casal Rotondo

==== 6th mile and beyond ====
- Minucia tomb
- Torre Selce
- Temple of Hercules
- Berrettia di Prete (tomb and later church)
- Mausoleum of Gallienus
- Tres Tabernae
- Villa of Publius Clodius Pulcher (in the Villa Santa Caterina, owned by the Pontifical North American College), 14th mile
- Villa of Pompey

==== Bridges along the road ====
There are the remains of several Roman bridges along the road, including the Ponte di Tre Ponti, Ponte di Vigna Capoccio, Viadotta di Valle Ariccia, Ponte Alto and Ponte Antico.

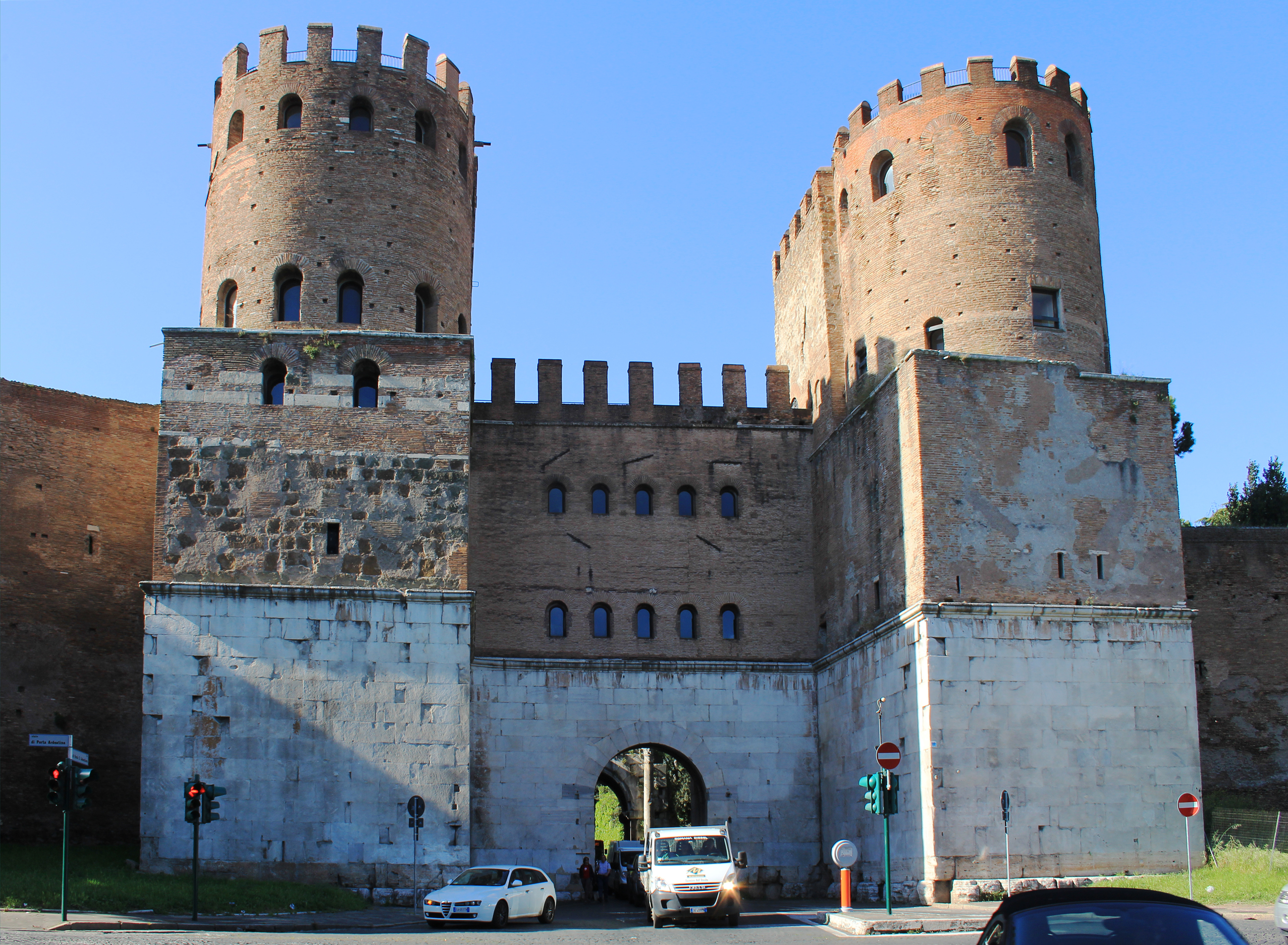
Porta San Sebastiano is the gate of the Appia in the Aurelian Walls.

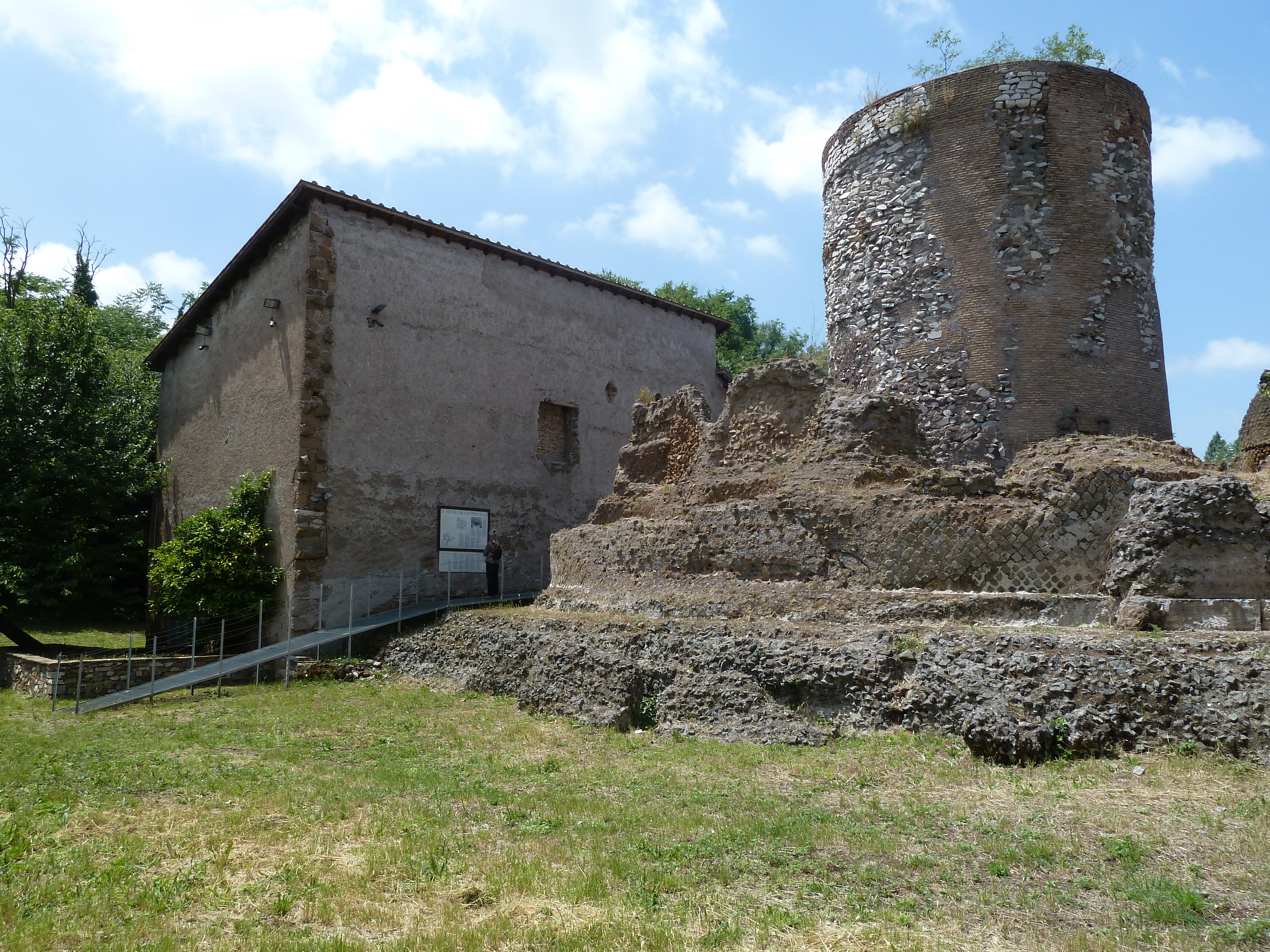
Tomb of Priscilla

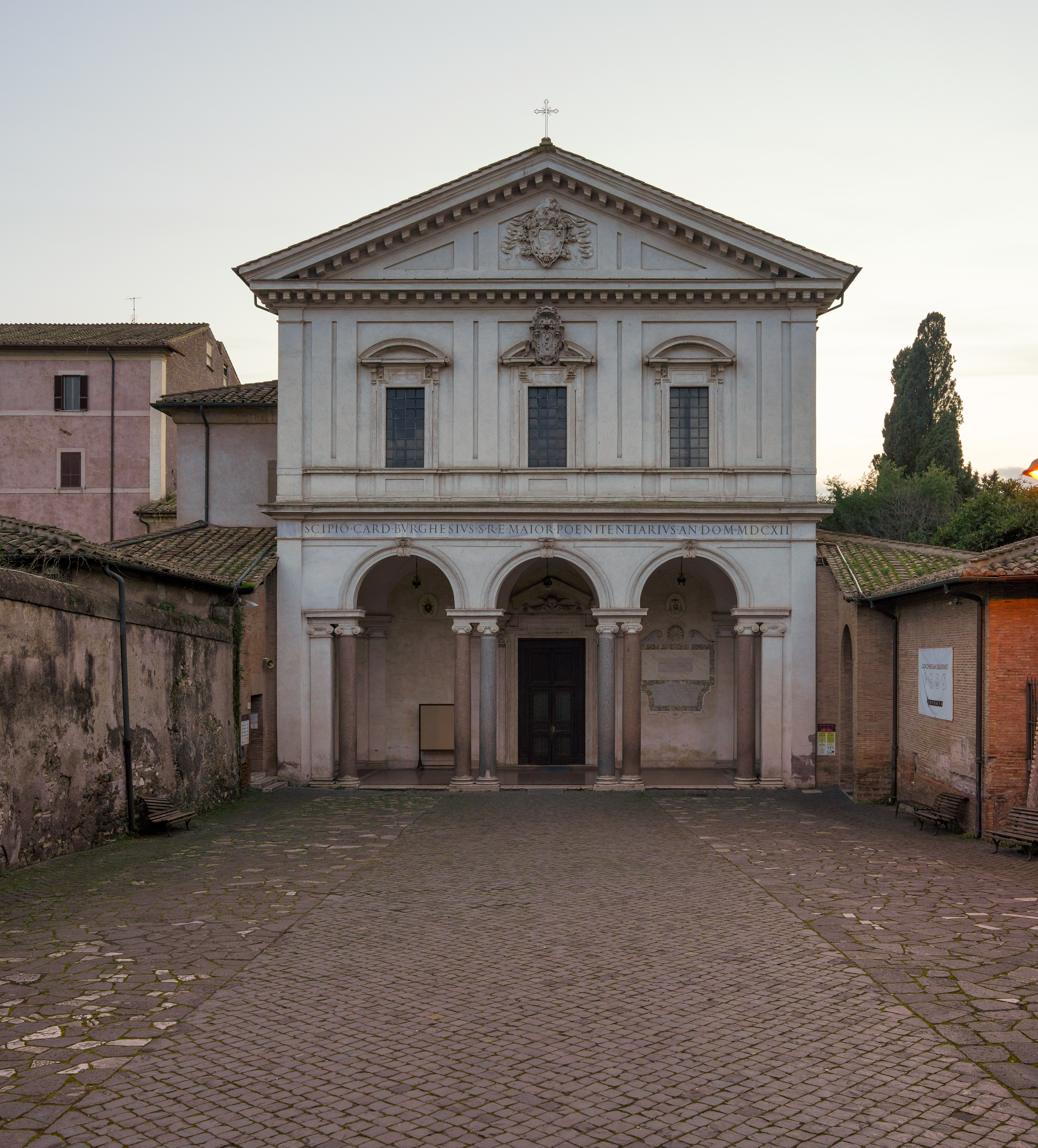
San Sebastiano fuori le Mura, located on the catacombs of San Sebastiano

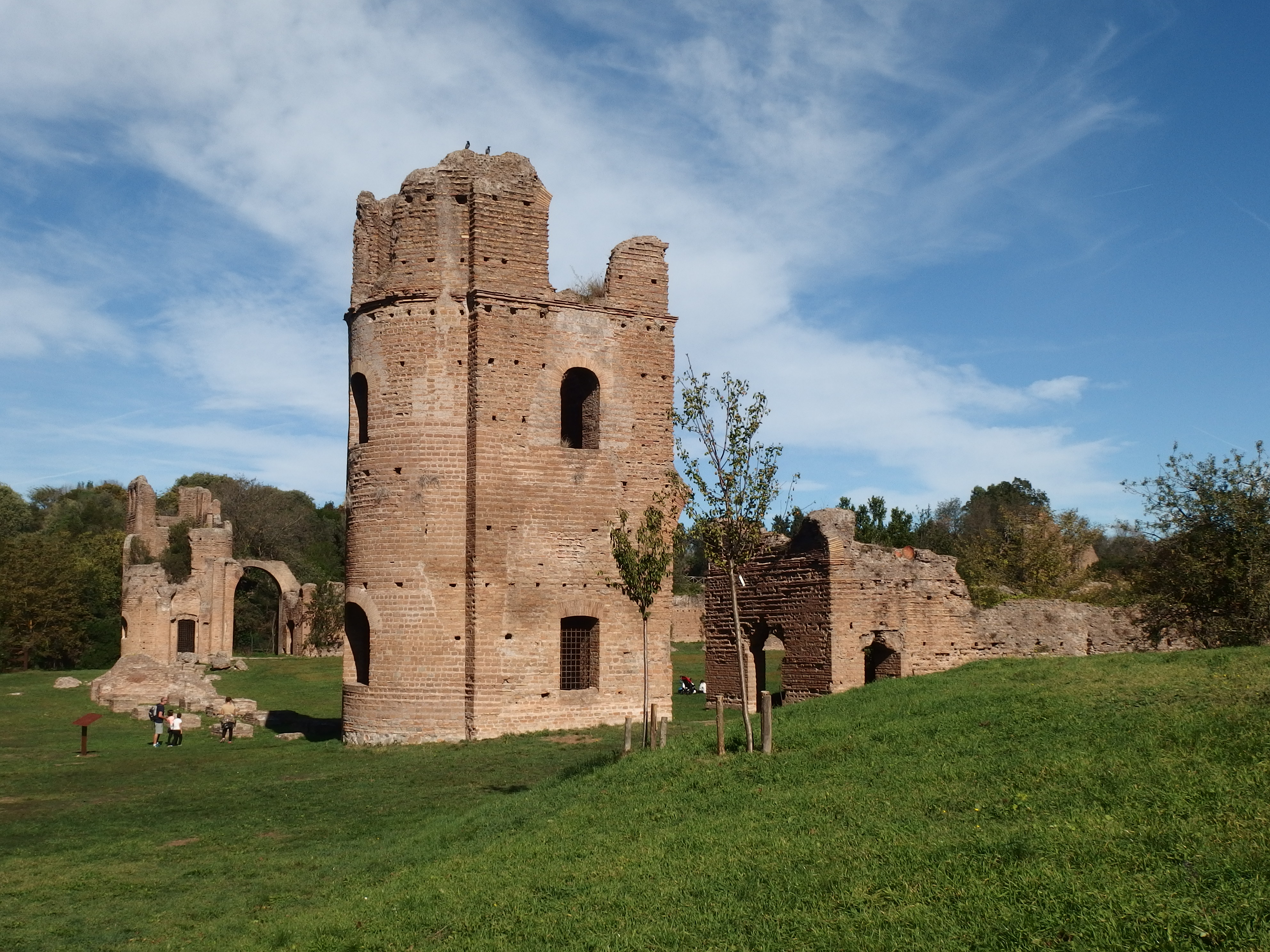
The Circus of Maxentius

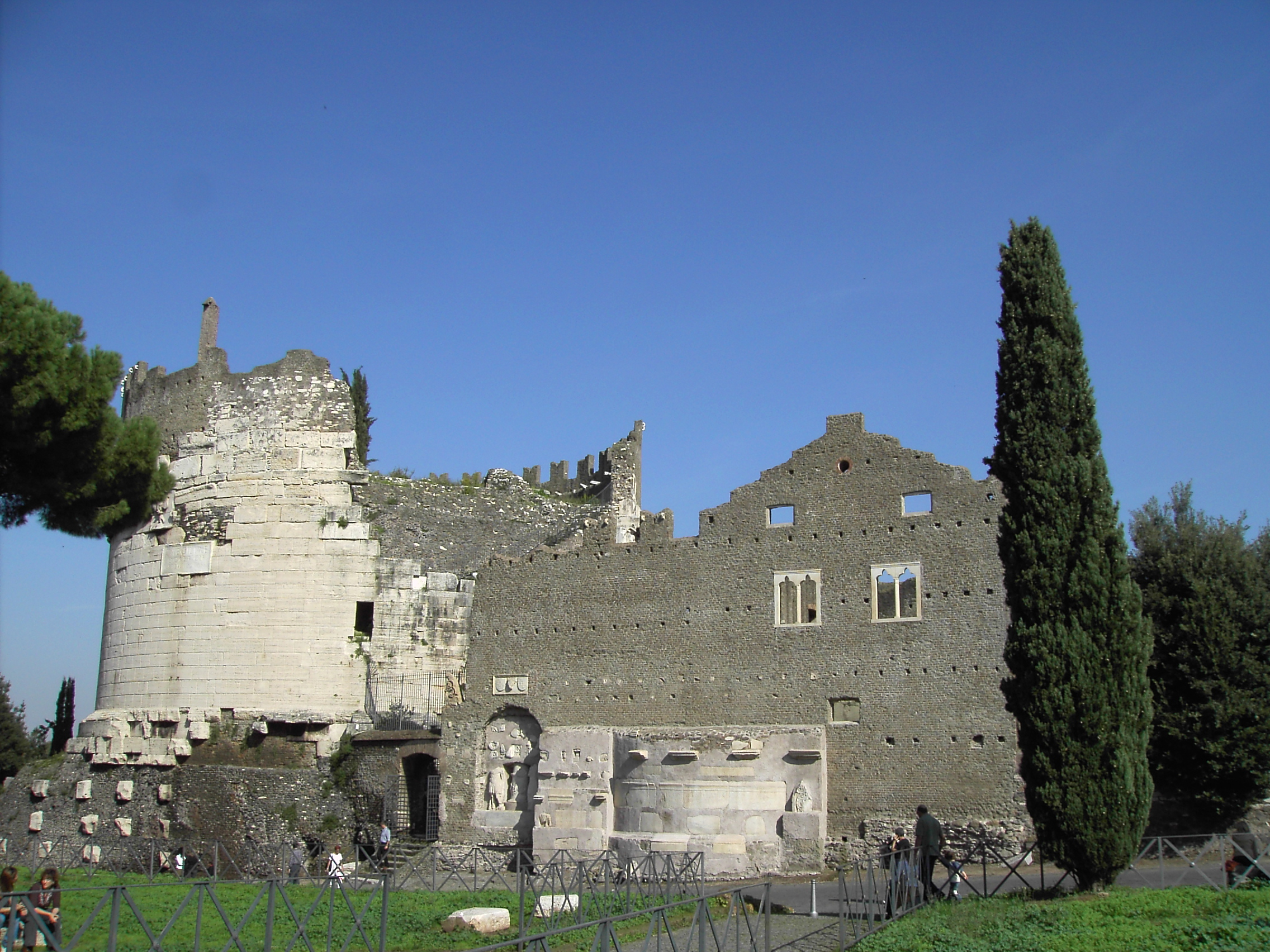
Tomb of Caecilia Metella and the castrum Caetani

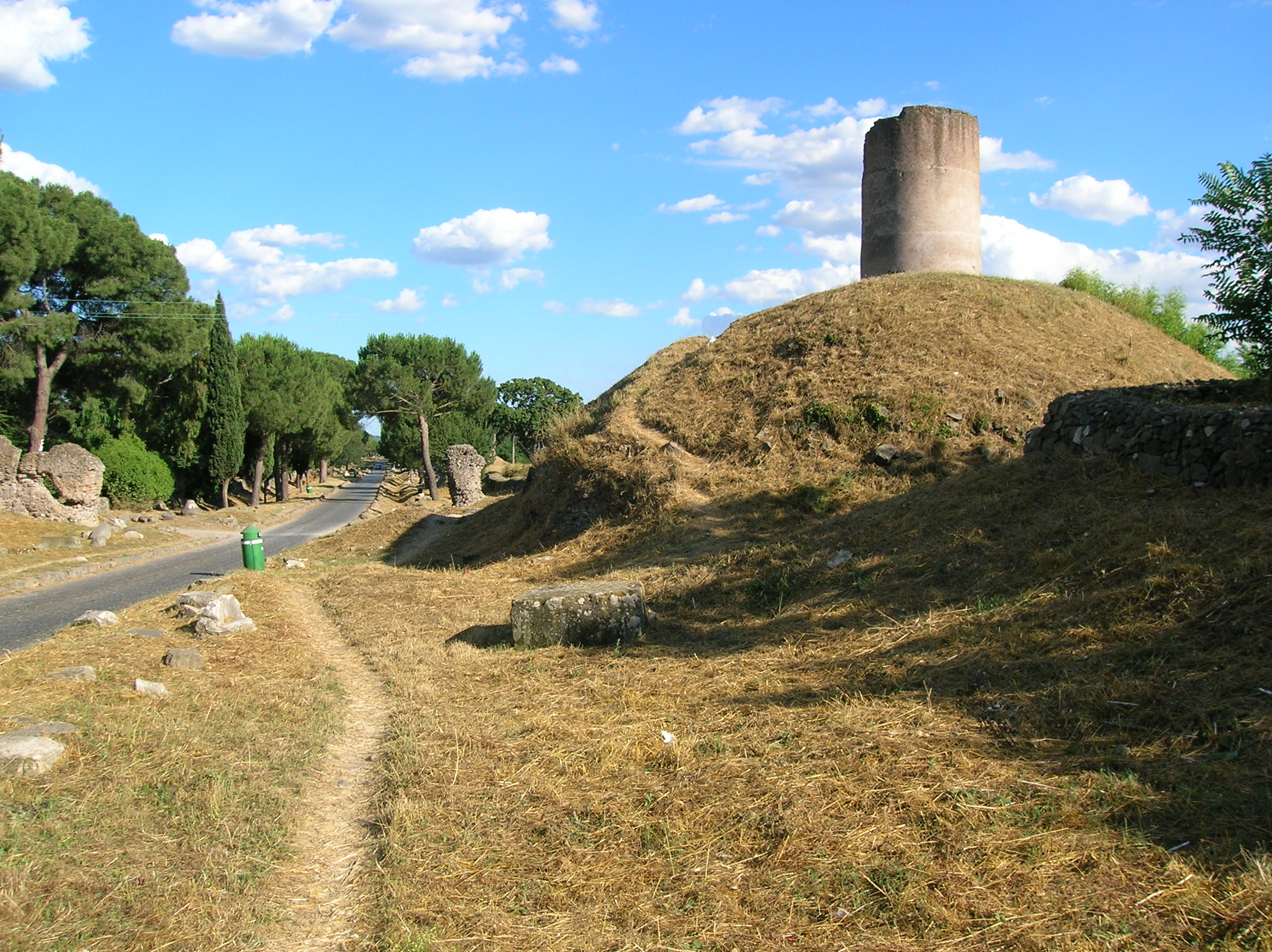
The Mausoleum of the Curiazi has been dated to between the end of the Republic and the beginning of the Empire.

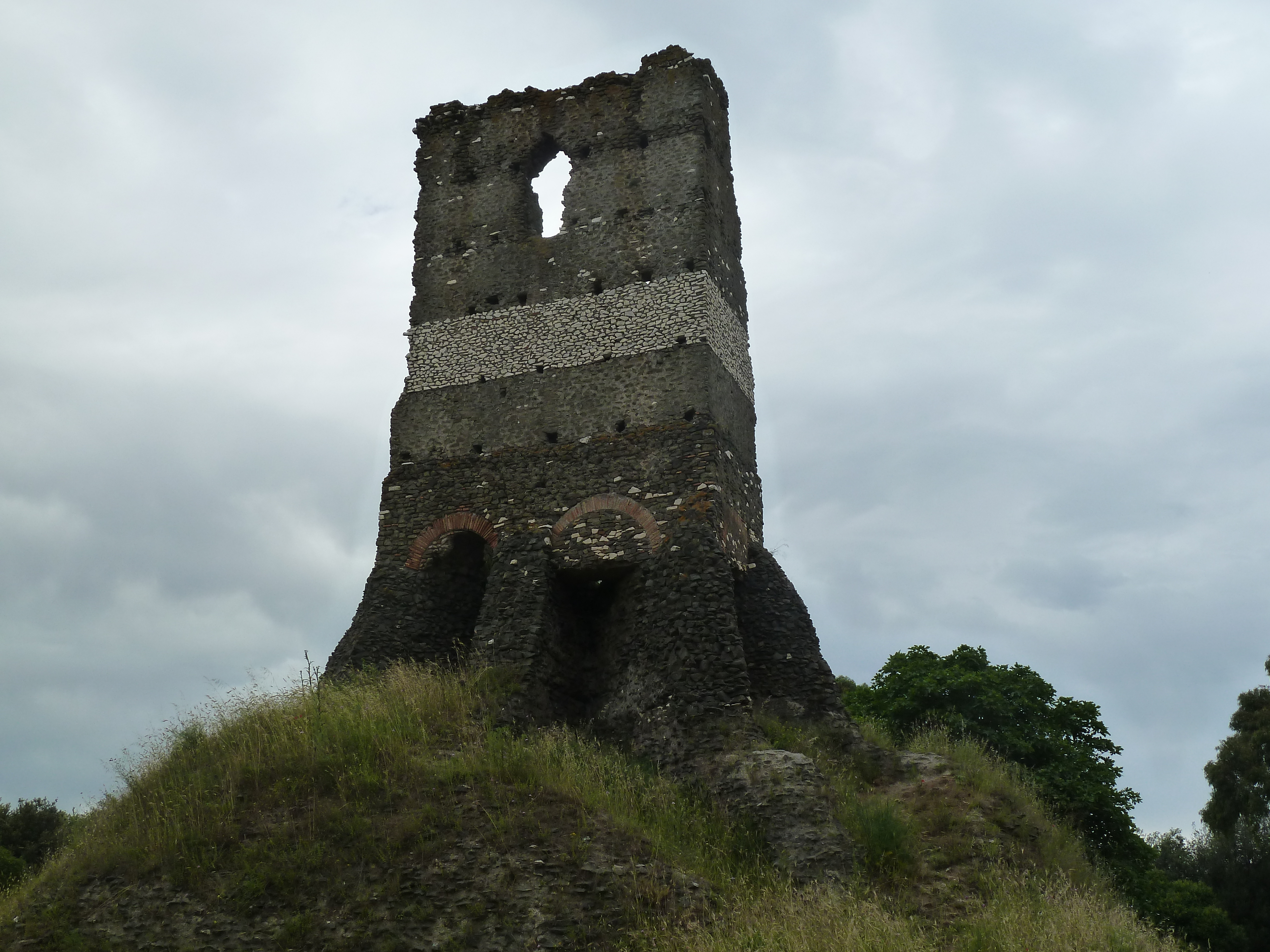
Torre Selce, a 12th-century tower built on a much older mausoleum

== See also ==
- Appian Way Regional Park
- Park of the Caffarella – which borders the northern side of the Appian Way
- Roman bridge
- Roman engineering
- Three Taverns
- The Pines of the Appian Way – a movement of Ottorino Respighi's tone poem Pines of Rome

== Bibliography ==
- Berechman, Joseph. 2003. "Transportation – Economic Aspects of Roman Highway Development: The Case of Via Appia". Transportation Research Part A 37, no. 5: 453–478.
- Coarelli, Filippo. 2007. Rome and environs: An archaeological guide. Translated by James J. Clauss and Daniel P. Harmon. Berkeley: Univ. of California Press.
- Della Portella, Ivana. 2004. The Appian Way: From Its Foundation to the Middle Ages. Los Angeles: J. Paul Getty Museum.
- Dubbini, Rachele. 2016. "A New Republican Temple on the Via Appia, at the Borders of Rome's Urban Space". Journal of Roman Archaeology 29: 327–347.
- Kleijn, M. de, R. de Hond, and O. Martinez-Rubi. 2016. "A 3D Spatial Data Infrastructure for Mapping the Via Appia". Digital Applications in Archaeology and Cultural Heritage 3: 23–32.
- Magli, Giulio, Eugenio Realini, Mirko Reguzzoni, and Daniele Sampietro. 2014. "Uncovering a Masterpiece of Roman Engineering: The Project of Via Appia between Colle Pardo and Terracina". Journal of Cultural Heritage 15, no. 6: 665–669.
- Peterson, John. 2015. "Modelling Roman surveying in the Pontine plain". 1st International Conference on Metrology for Archaeology Benevento, Italy, 22–23 October 2015 445–459.
- Luciano Piepoli (2014). "Il percorso della via Appia antica nell'Apulia et Calabria: stato dell'arte e nuove acquisizioni sul tratto Gravina-Taranto". Vetera Christianorum (in Italian) (51): 239–261.
- Giuseppe Lugli. La via Appia attraverso l'Apulia e un singolare gruppo di strade "orientate" (PDF) (in Italian). Archived (PDF) from the original on 29 December 2021.
- Smith, William (1854). Dictionary of Greek and Roman Geography. London.

Preceded by Spanish Steps	Landmarks of Rome; Appian Way	Succeeded by Campo de' Fiori
