= Felicitas of Rome =

Christian saint (circa 101–165 CE)

Saint Felicitas (Felicity) of Rome
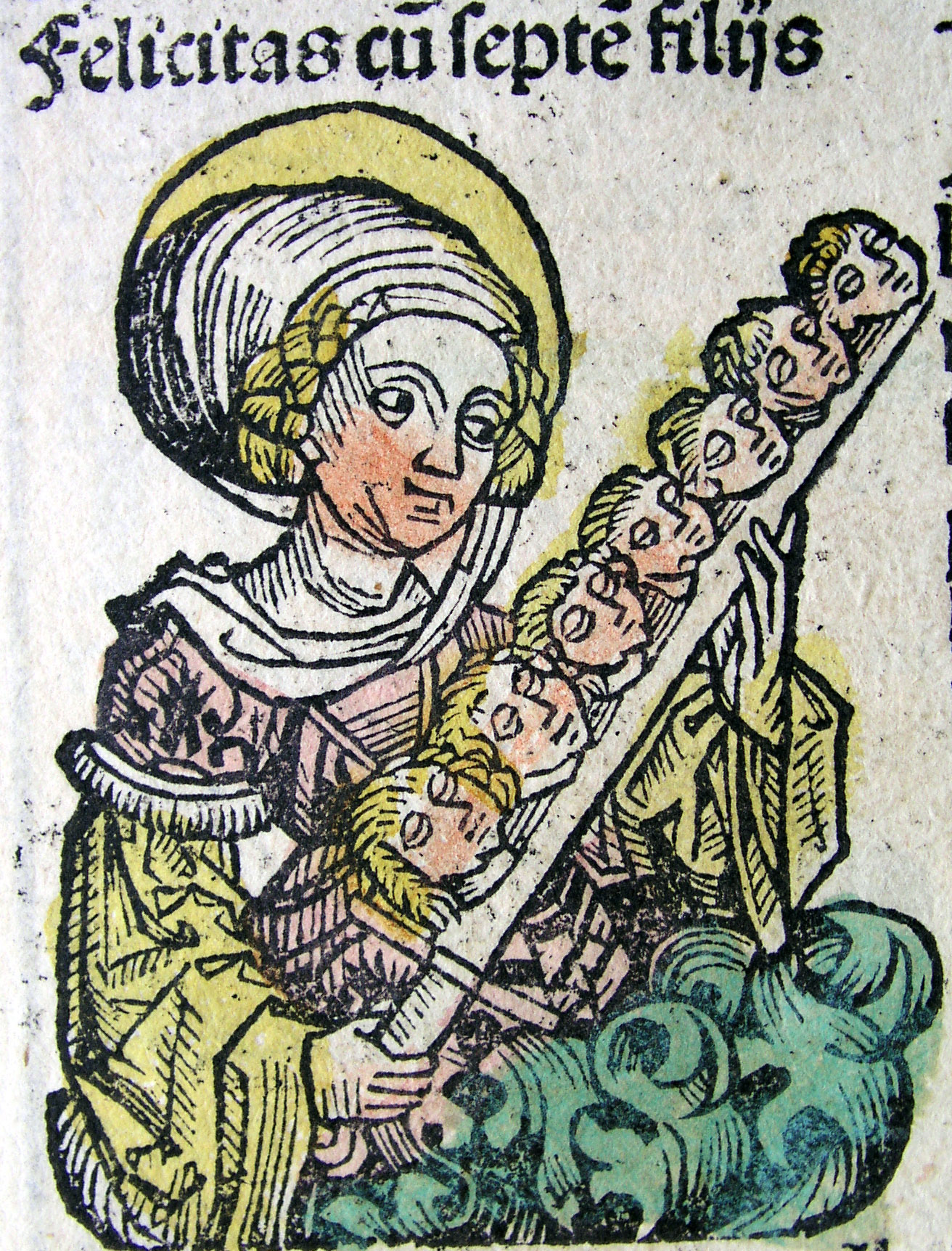
- St. Felicitas and the heads of her seven sons, from the Nuremberg Chronicle, 1493.

Martyr
- Born: c. 101; Rome, Roman Empire
- Died: c. 165; Rome, Roman Empire
- Venerated in: Roman Catholic Church; Eastern Orthodox Church
- Canonized: Pre-Congregation
- Major shrine: Church of Santa Susanna, Rome
- Feast: 23 November
- Attributes: sword and seven sons
- Patronage: parents who have lost a child in death; death of children; martyrs; sterility; to have male children; widows; (reflecting only St Martialis) - Town of Torricella Peligna, Province of Chieti, Town of Collarmele, Province of Aquila, in the Abruzzo, The town of Stevenage in Hertfordshire, UK and the town of Isca sullo Ionio, Province of Catanzaro, Calabria, Italy

Felicitas of Rome (c. 101 – 165), also anglicized as Felicity, is a saint numbered among the Christian martyrs. Apart from her name, the only thing known for certain about this martyr is that she was buried in the Cemetery of Maximus, on the Via Salaria on a 23 November. However, a legend presents her as the mother of the seven martyrs whose feast is celebrated on 10 July. The Eastern Orthodox Church celebrates their martyrdom on 25 January.

The legend of Saint Symphorosa is very similar and their acts may have been confused. She was a patron saint of healing. They may even be the same person. This Felicitas is not the same as the North African Felicitas who was martyred with Perpetua.

== History of Saint Felicitas ==
The feast of Saint Felicitas of Rome was first mentioned in the "Martyrologium Hieronymianum" as celebrated on 25 January. From a very early date her feast as a martyr was solemnly celebrated in the Roman Church on that date, as shown by the fact that on that day Saint Gregory the Great delivered a homily in the Basilica that rose above her tomb. Her body then rested in the catacomb of Maximus on the Via Salaria; in that cemetery all Roman itineraries, or guides to the burial-places of martyrs, locate her burial-place, specifying that her tomb was in a church above this catacomb. The crypt where St Felicitas was laid to rest was later enlarged into a subterranean chapel, and was rediscovered in 1885.

In the early Middle Ages there was a chapel in honour of St Felicitas (Felicity) in an ancient Roman edifice near the ruins of the Baths of Titus.

Some of her relics are in the Capuchin church at Montefiascone, Tuscany. Others are in the church of Santa Susanna in Rome.

== Association with the seven martyrs venerated on 10 July ==
Seven martyrs who on that day, though perhaps in different years, were buried in four different Roman cemeteries are celebrated jointly on 10 July:

- Saints Alexander, Vitalis, and Martial(is) (Cemetery of the Jordani, on the Via Salaria)
- Saint Januarius (Cemetery of Praetextatus, on the Via Appia)
- Saints Felix and Philip (Cemetery of Priscilla, on the Via Salaria)
- Saint Sylvanus or Silvanus (Cemetery of Maximus, on the Via Salaria)

The earliest list of the Roman feasts of martyrs, known as the "Depositio Martyrum" and dating from the time of Pope Liberius, in the middle of the fourth century, already mentions these seven martyrs as celebrated on 10 July in the four different catacombs in which their bodies lay. To the name of Silvanus it adds the statement that his body was stolen by the Novatians (hunc Silvanum martyrem Novatiani furati sunt). It does not say that they were brothers.

The tomb of St Januarius in the catacomb of Prætextatus belongs to the end of the second century, to which period, therefore, the martyrdoms, if they are in fact associated with one another, must belong, under the Emperor Marcus Aurelius.

One of the seven martyrs, Saint Martialis (Martial, Marziale), is venerated as the patron saint of Torricella Peligna in the Abruzzo, and Isca sullo Ionio in Calabria, Italy with his feast day on 10 July.

Until it was revised in 1969, the General Roman Calendar designated these seven martyrs as "The Seven Holy Brothers", and some traditionalist Catholics continue to celebrate them under this designation.

=== Legend of Felicitas and the Seven Holy Brothers ===
Saint Felicitas (also known as Felicity) is said to have been a rich and pious Christian widow who had seven sons. She devoted herself to charitable work and converted many to the Christian faith by her example. This aroused the wrath of pagan priests who lodged a complaint against her with Emperor Marcus Aurelius. These priests asserted the ire of the gods and demanded sacrifice from Felicitas and her children. The Emperor acquiesced to their demand and Felicitas was brought before Publius, the Prefect of Rome. Taking Felicitas aside, he used various pleas and threats in an unsuccessful attempt to get her to worship the pagan gods. He was equally unsuccessful with her seven sons who followed their mother's example.

Before the Prefect Publius they adhered firmly to their religion, and were delivered over to four judges, who condemned them to various modes of death. The division of the martyrs among four judges corresponds to the four places of their burial. She implored God only that she not to be killed before her sons, so that she might be able to encourage them during their torture and death in order that they would not deny Christ. With joy, she accompanied her sons one by one until she had witnessed the death of all seven. We are not entirely sure as to how each of them died, but it is said that Januarius, the eldest, was scourged to death; Felix and Philip were beaten with clubs until they expired; Silvanus was thrown headlong down a precipice; and the three youngest, Alexander, Vitalis and Martialis were beheaded. After each execution she was given the chance to denounce her faith. She refused to act against her conscience and so she too suffered martyrdom. Certain communities around the United States still celebrate San Marziale (Saint Martialis/Saint Marshall) with a San Marziale festival typically held on July 10 or near that date.

They suffered and died in Rome about the year 164 She was buried in the catacomb of Maximus on the Via Salaria, beside St Silvanus. It is said that she died eight times. Once with each of her sons, and finally her own, and their feast day is held on January 25.

=== Origin of the legend ===
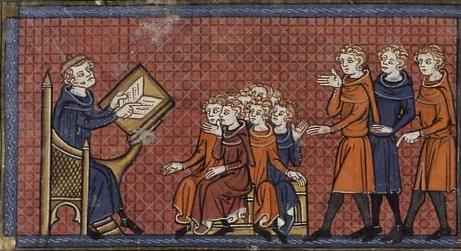
The Seven Holy Brothers

The "Acts" that give the above account of the seven martyrs as sons of Felicitas existed, in some form, in the sixth century, since Pope Gregory I refers to them in his "Homiliæ super Evangelia, book I, homily iii." The early twentieth century Catholic Encyclopedia reported that "even distinguished modern archæologists have considered them, though not in their present form corresponding entirely to the original, yet in substance based on genuine contemporary records." But it went on to say that investigations had shown this opinion to be hardly tenable. The earliest recension of these "Acts" does not antedate the sixth century, and appears to be based not on a Roman i.e. Latin text, but on a Greek original. Moreover, apart from the existing form of the "Acts," various details have been called into question. If Felicitas were really the mother of the seven martyrs honoured on 10 July, it is strange that her name does not appear in the well-known fourth-century Roman calendar.

The tomb of St Silvanus, one of the seven martyrs commemorated on 10 July, adjoined that of St Felicitas; it is quite possible, therefore, that tradition soon identified the seven martyrs of 10 July as the sons of St Felicitas, and that this formed the basis for the extant "Acts."

== See also ==
- Woman with seven sons
- List of Christian women of the patristic age
