= Jewish land purchase in Palestine =

Pre-1948 acquisition of land/property by Jewish buyers

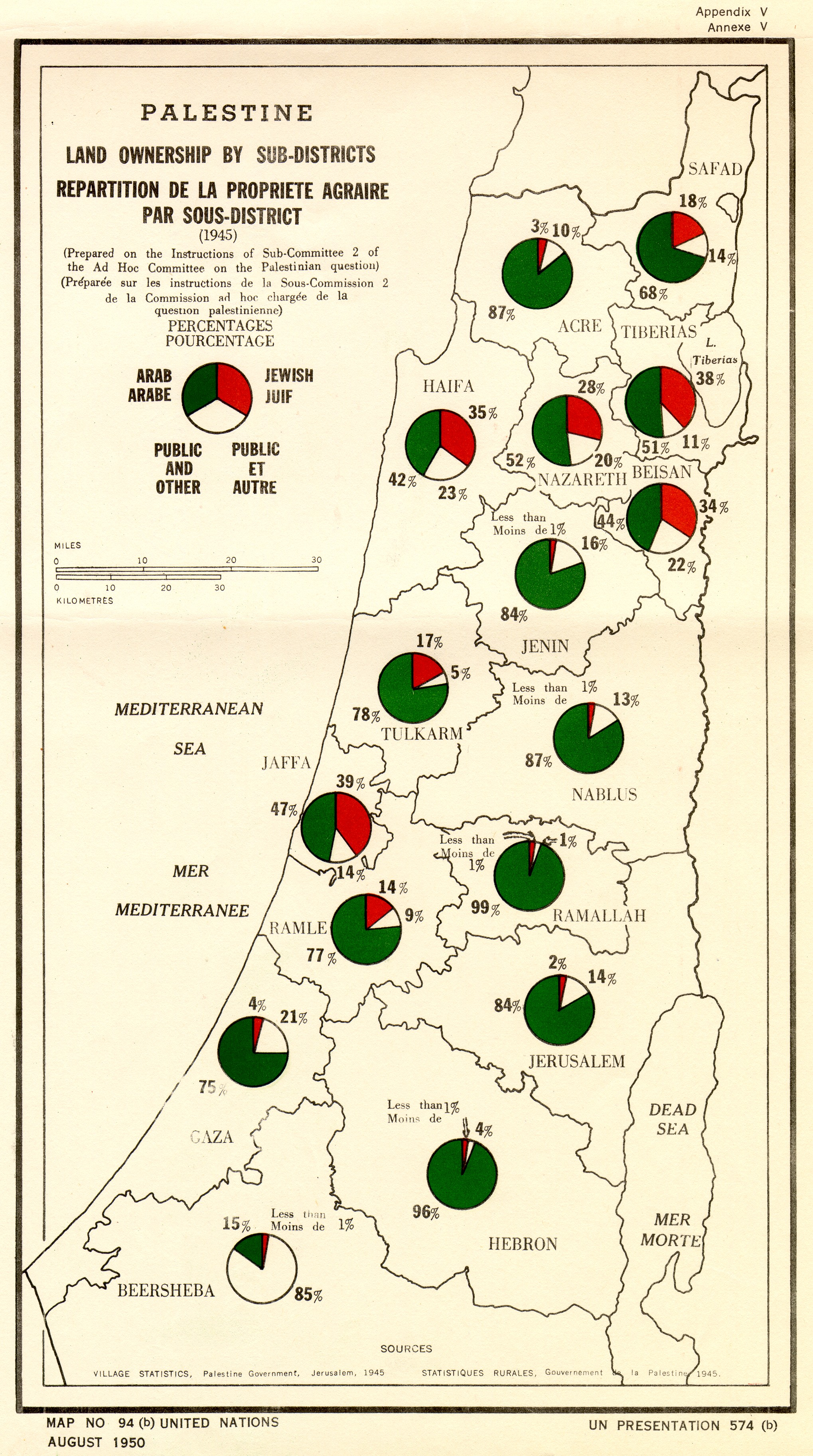
Palestine(1945) Land ownership by sub-district Map published in 1945 by UN Ad Hoc Committee on the Palestine Question

In the 1880s, Jews, began purchasing land and properties across Ottoman Palestine in order to expand the collective territorial ownership of the Yishuv. Large Jewish corporations and private Jewish buyers led this effort through multiple intermittent transactions that continued after Mandatory Palestine was established in 1918. The largest of these arrangements, known as the Sursock Purchases, resulted in the procurement of the Jezreel Valley and the Bay of Haifa by the 1930s.

The purchase of land was often accompanied by the eviction of the Arab tenants. On 1 April 1945, the British administration's statistics showed that Jewish buyers had legal ownership over approximately 5.67% of the Mandate's total land area, while state domain (a large part of which was held in hereditary lease or had undetermined ownership) was 46%. By the end of 1947, Jewish ownership had increased to 6.6%. This cycle of land acquisition ultimately ended when the Israeli Declaration of Independence yielded the founding of the Jewish state on 14 May 1948.

Notable large purchases included the Sursock Purchases and the Hula Concession purchase.

== Background ==
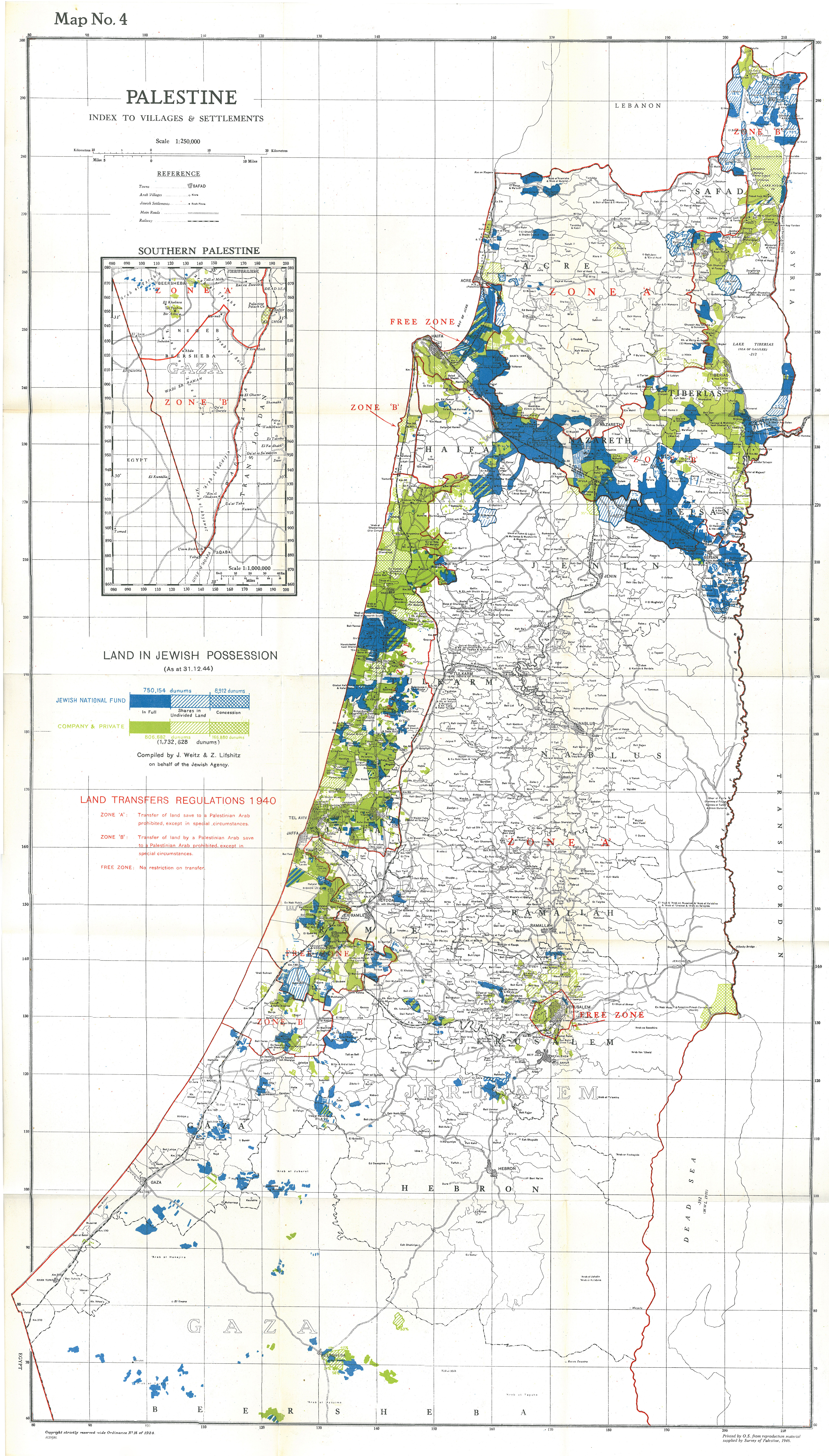
Map showing Jewish-owned land as of 31 December 1944, including land owned in full, shared in undivided land and State Lands under concession. This constituted 6% of the total land area, of which more than half was held by the JNF and PICA

Towards the end of the 19th century, the creation of the Zionist movement resulted in many Jews immigrating to Palestine. Most land purchases between the late 1880s and the 1930s were located in the coastal plain area, including "Acre to the North and Rehovoth to the South, the Esdraelon (Jezreel) and Jordan Valleys and to the lesser extent in Galilee". These were mostly the less inhabited coasts and valleys, which had high rates of malaria. The migration affected Palestine in many ways, including economically, socially, and politically.

From the outset, the Zionist leadership saw land acquisition as essential to achieving their goal of establishing a Jewish state. This acquisition was strategic, aiming to create a continuous area of Jewish land. The WZO established the Jewish National Fund (JNF) in 1901, with the stated goal "to redeem the land of Palestine as the inalienable possession of the Jewish people." The notion of land "redemption" entailed that the land could not be sold and could not be leased to a non-Jew nor should the land be worked by Arabs, though most Zionists continued to employ fellaheen to perform labor on their lands. The land purchased was primarily from absentee landlords, and upon purchase of the land, the tenant farmers who traditionally had rights of usufruct were often expelled. Herzl publicly opposed this dispossession, but wrote privately in his diary: "We shall try to spirit the penniless population across the border by procuring employment for it in the transit countries, while denying it any employment in our country... Both the process of expropriation and the removal of the poor must be carried out discreetly and circumspectly." The arrival of Zionist settlers to Palestine in the late 19th century is widely seen as the start of the Israeli–Palestinian conflict. Zionists wanted to create a Jewish state in Palestine with as much land, as many Jews, and as few Palestinian Arabs as possible.

== History and purchase policies ==
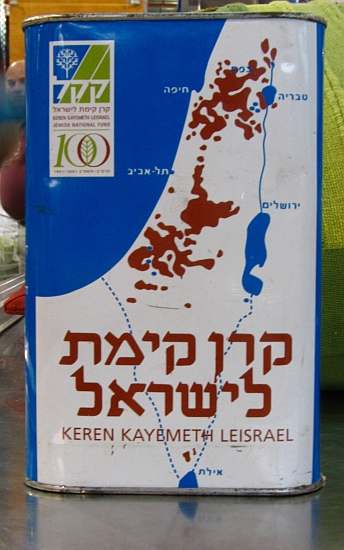
KKL collection boxes to fund land purchases in Palestine were distributed among Jews from 1904 onwards

In the first half of the 19th century, no foreigners were allowed to purchase land in Palestine. This was official Ottoman policy until 1856 and in practice until 1867. When it came to the national aspirations of the Zionist movement, the Ottoman Empire opposed the idea of Jewish self-rule in Palestine, fearing it might lose control of Palestine after recently having lost other territories to various European powers. It also took issue with the Jews, as many came from Russia, which sought the empire's demise. In 1881 the Ottoman governmental administration (the Sublime Porte) decreed that foreign Jews could immigrate to and settle anywhere within the Ottoman Empire, except in Palestine and from 1882 until their defeat in 1918, the Ottomans continuously restricted Jewish immigration and land purchases in Palestine. In 1892, the Ottoman government decided to prohibit the sale of land in Palestine to Jews, even if they were Ottoman citizens. Nevertheless, during the late 19th century and the beginning of the 20th century, many successful land purchases were made through organizations such as the Palestine Jewish Colonization Association (PJCA), Palestine Land Development Company and the Jewish National Fund.

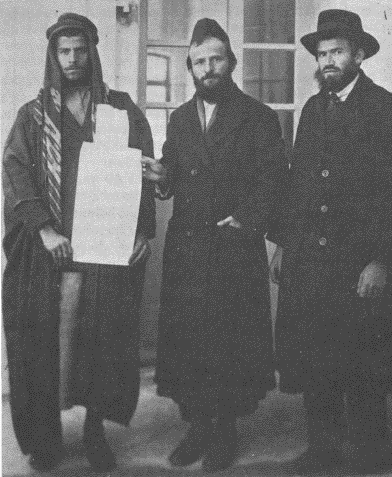
Jewish rabbis receiving the title deed for lands that they purchased from the Arab landowner in Mandatory Palestine, 1920s

The Ottoman Land Code of 1858 "brought about the appropriation by the influential and rich families of Beirut, Damascus, and to a lesser extent Jerusalem and Jaffa and other sub-district capitals, of vast tracts of land in Syria and Palestine and their registration in the name of these families in the land registers". According to Palestinian-American anthropologist Nasser Abufarha, "In 1858 the Ottoman Authority introduced the law of tabu to fix rights of ownership of the land. Land owners were instructed to have their property inscribed in the land register. The tabu was resisted by the fellahin. They saw a threat to their community in registering their land for two main reasons: 1) the cultivated fields were classified as ardh ameriyeh (the land of the Emarit) and were taxed. Owners of registered fertile land were forced to pay tax on it; 2) data from the land register were used by the Turkish Army for the purpose of the draft. Owners of registered lands were often drafted to fight with the Turkish Army in Russia."

In 1918, after the British conquest of Palestine, the military administration closed the Land Register and prohibited all sale of land. The Register was reopened in 1920, but to prevent speculation and ensure a livelihood for the fellahin, an edict was issued forbidding the sale of more than 300 dunams of land or the sale of land valued at more than 3000 Palestine pounds without the approval of the High Commissioner.

From the 1880s to the 1930s, most Jewish land purchases were made in the coastal plain, the Jezreel Valley, the Jordan Valley and to a lesser extent the Galilee. This was due to a preference for land that was cheap and without tenants. There were two main reasons why these areas were sparsely populated. The first reason being when the Ottoman power in the rural areas began to diminish in the seventeenth century, many people moved to more centralized areas to secure protection against the Bedouin tribes. The second reason for the sparsely populated areas of the coastal plains was the soil type. The soil, covered in a layer of sand, made it impossible to grow the staple crop of Palestine, corn. As a result, this area remained uncultivated and underpopulated, enabling the Jews to purchase land without a massive displacement and eviction of Arab tenants.

In the 1930s, most of the land was bought from landowners. Of the land that the Jews bought, 52.6% were bought from non-Palestinian landowners, 24.6% from Palestinian landowners, 13.4% from government, churches, and foreign companies, and only 9.4% from fellaheen (farmers).

On 31 December 1944, out of the land owned in Palestine by large Jewish Corporations and private owners, about 44% was in possession of Jewish National Fund. The table below shows the land ownership of Palestine by large Jewish Corporations (in square kilometres) on 31 December 1945.

Land ownership of Palestine by large Jewish corporations (in square kilometres) on 31 December 1945
| Corporations | Area |
|---|---|
| JNF | 660.10 |
| PICA | 193.70 |
| Palestine Land Development Company | 9.70 |
| Hemnuta Ltd | 16.50 |
| Africa Palestine Investment Co. Ltd. | 9.90 |
| Bayside Land Corporation Ltd. | 8.50 |
| Palestine Kupat Am. Bank Ltd. | 8.40 |
| Total | 906.80 |
Data is from Survey of Palestine (Vol I, p245).

By the end of the mandate, more than half the Jewish-owned land was held by the two largest Jewish funds, the Jewish National Fund and the Palestine Jewish Colonization Association.

By the end of the British Mandate period in 1948, Jewish farmers had cultivated 425,450 dunams of land, while Arab farmers had 5,484,700 dunams of land under cultivation.

== Peel Commission ==
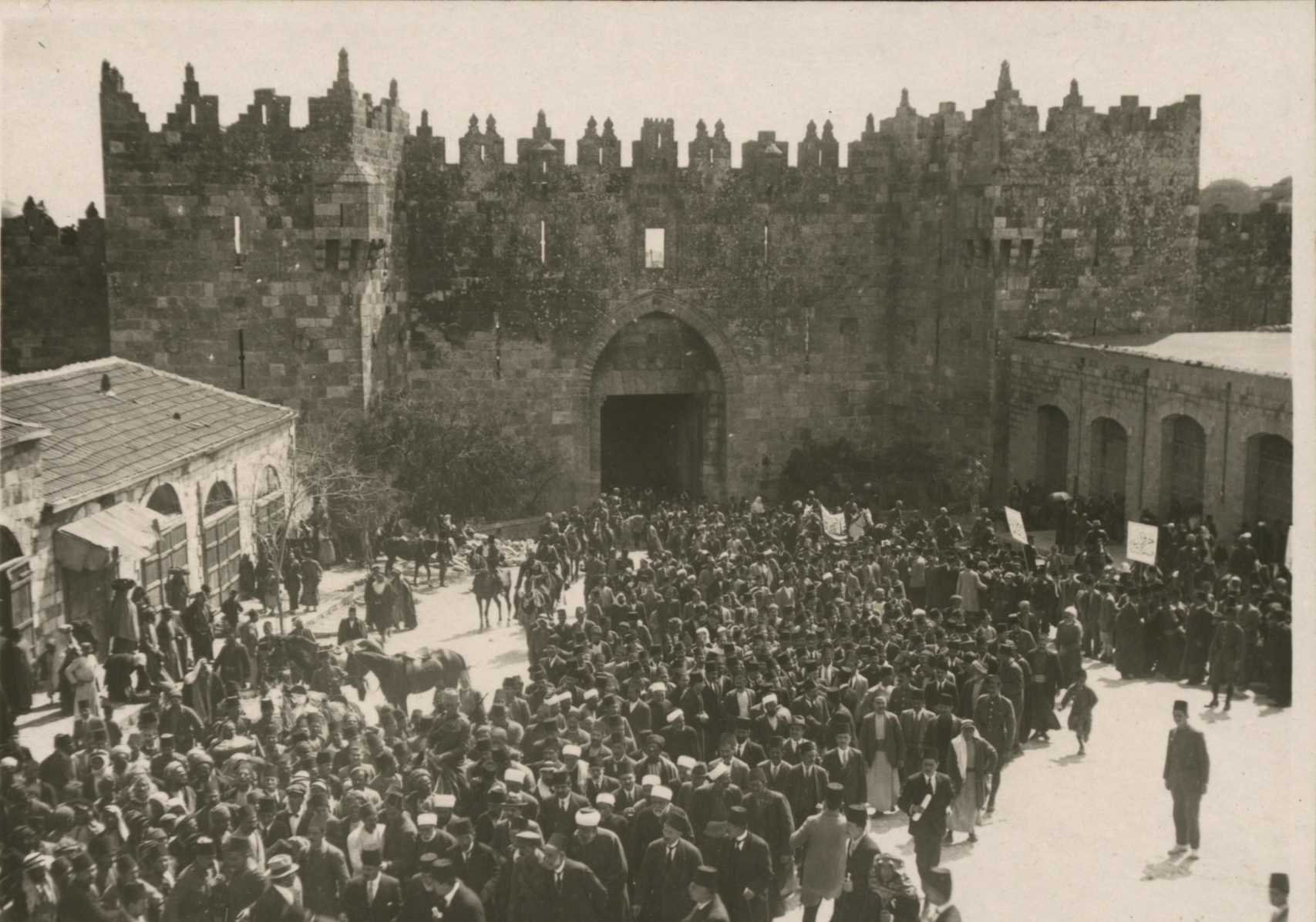
Arab anti-Zionist protests at the Damascus Gate, 8 March 1920

In 1936 the British government appointed the Peel Commission to investigate the reasons for the civil unrest in Palestine. Addressing land purchases, the commission reported:

The Palestine Order in Council and, if necessary, the Mandate should be amended to permit of legislation empowering the High Commissioner to prohibit the transfer of land in any stated area to Jews, so that the obligation to safeguard the right and position of the Arabs may be carried out. [...]

Up till now the Arab cultivator has benefited on the whole both from the work of the British Administration and the presence of Jews in the country, but the greatest care must now be exercised to see that in the event of further sales of land by Arabs to Jews the rights of any Arab tenants or cultivators are preserved. [...]

The shortage of land is due less to purchase by Jews than to the increase in the Arab population. The Arab claims that the Jews have obtained too large a proportion of good land cannot be maintained. Much of the land now carrying orange groves was sand dunes or swamps and uncultivated when it was bought.

== Economic impact ==
The fellahin who sold land in an attempt to turn "vegetable tracts into citrus groves became dependent on world markets and on the availability of maritime transportation. A decrease in the world market demand for citrus or a lack of means of transportation severely jeopardized the economic situation of these people".

== Impact on the local Arab populace ==
Director of Development Lewis French established a register of landless Arabs in 1931. Out of 3,271 applicants, only 664 were admitted and the remainder rejected. Porath suggests that the number of displaced Arabs may have been considerably larger, since French's definition of "landless Arab" excluded those who had sold their own land, those who owned land elsewhere, those who had since obtained tenancy of other land even if they were unable to cultivate it due to poverty or debt, and displaced persons who were not cultivators but had occupations such as ploughman or laborer.

== See also ==
- Jewish National Fund
- Palestine Jewish Colonization Association
- Palestine Land Development Company
- Concessions in Mandatory Palestine
- Peel Commission
- Palestinian Authority land laws § Land sale to non-Palestinians

== Bibliography ==
- Dershowitz, Alan (2003). The Case for Israel. New Jersey: John Wiley and Sons.
- Porath, Y. (1977). The Palestinian Arab National Movement: From Riots to Rebellion. London, UK: Frank Cass and Company Ltd.
- Hallbrook, Stephen P. (Fall 1981). "The Alienation of a Homeland: How Palestine Became Israel" (PDF). The Journal of Libertarian Studies. V (4). Archived from the original (PDF) on 24 October 2023.
