= Sursock Purchases =

Largest Jewish land purchase in Palestine during the period of early Jewish immigration

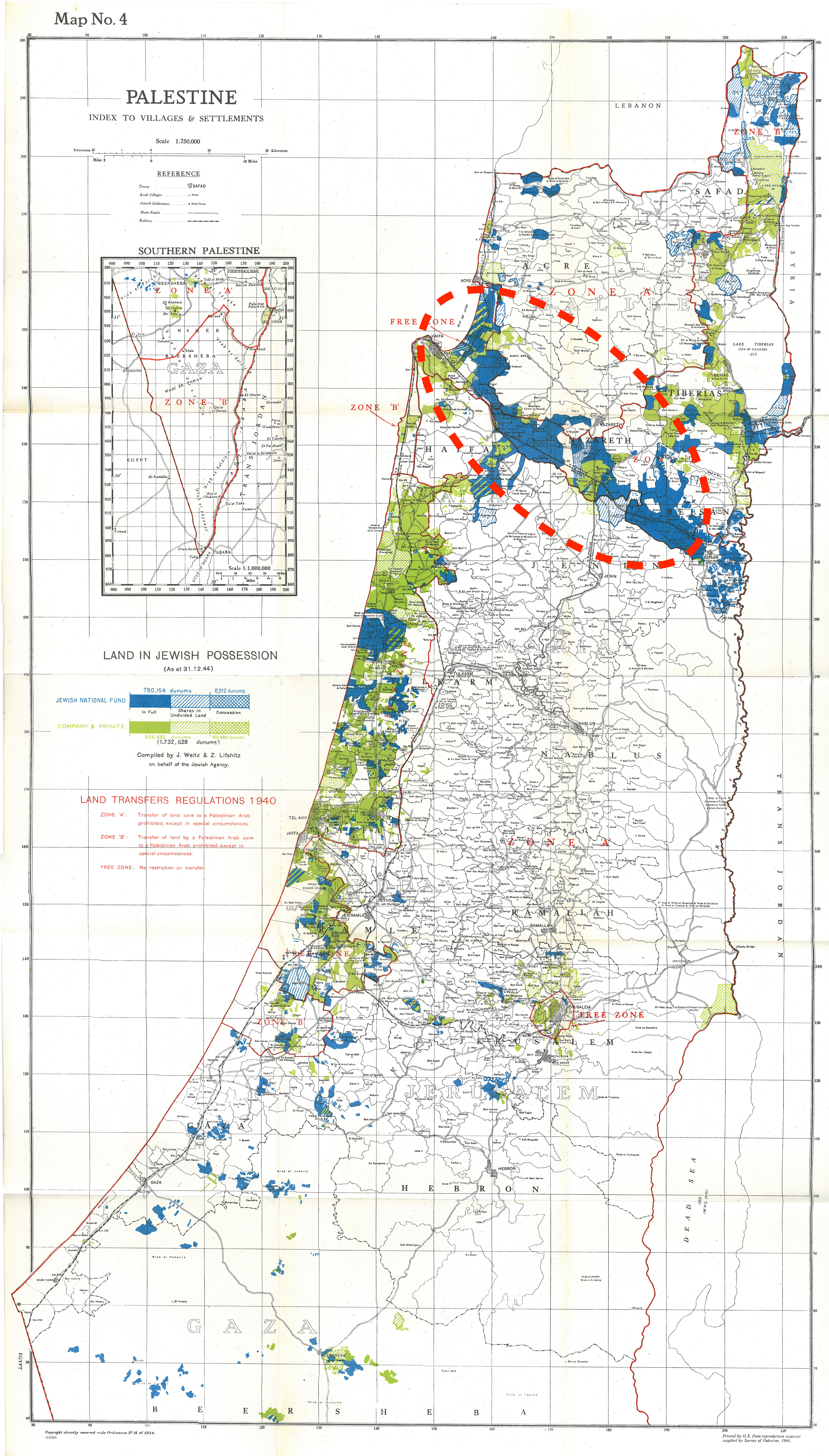
The Sursock purchase (see red dotted circle) illustrated on a map of Jewish land purchase in Palestine as at 1944; the dark blue represents land then owned by the Jewish National Fund, of which most in the circled area had been acquired under the Sursock Purchase.

The Sursock Purchases were land purchases made by Jewish organizations from the absentee landowning Lebanese Greek Orthodox Christian Sursock family, mainly from 1901 to 1925. These included the Jezreel Valley and Haifa Bay, as well as other lands in what became the Mandate for Palestine. These collectively formed the largest Jewish land purchase in Palestine during the period of early Jewish immigration, and resulted in the eviction of 8,730 tenants.

The Jezreel Valley was considered the most fertile region of Palestine. The Sursock Purchase represented 58% of Jewish land purchases from absentee foreign landlords (as identified in a partial list in a 25 February 1946 memorandum submitted by the Arab Higher Committee to the Anglo-American Committee of Inquiry). The buyers demanded the existing population be relocated and, as a result, the Palestinian Arab tenant farmers were evicted, and approximately 20–25 villages were depopulated. Some of the evicted population received compensation though the buyers were not required under the new British Mandate law to pay. The total amount sold by the Sursocks and their partners represented 22% of all land purchased by Jews in Palestine until 1948, and, as first identified by Arthur Ruppin in 1907, this sale was perceived as vitally important in sustaining the territorial continuity of Jewish settlement in Palestine.

Palestinians' responses to the Sursock Purchase/Afula incident at the time constitute "one of the earliest cases of organized opposition to Zionist land purchase in Palestine."

== Background ==
Through much of the period of Ottoman rule, the low-lying land of Palestine had suffered from depopulation due to the unhealthy conditions on the plains, and the insecurity of life there. According to Henry Laurens, this was not peculiar to that region, but rather reflected a general trait also common to all the littoral regions north and south of the Mediterranean. Malaria was widespread in the area, especially in the plains, hindering settlement and allowing Bedouins to settle there. During drought years, Bedouins from the ghor even encroached on lands cultivated by local fellahin, covering the entire area with their tents. The "permanent" nomads, Bedouins of Turkmen descent, lived in the Jezreel Valley during summer and autumn, then spent winters between the Sharon region and the Valley, passing through the Manasseh Hills.

According to Henry Laurens, Zionism's concept of the conquest of labour by Jewish workers meant excluding wherever possible employment of the local Arab workforce.

== Sursock purchases from the Ottoman Government ==
In 1872, the Ottoman Government sold the Jezreel Valley (in Arabic, Marj ibn Amir) to the Sursock family for approximately £20,000. The family went on to acquire 230,000 to 400,000 dunams (90,000 acres or 364 km^{2}). These purchases were sustained over a number of years.

This purchase, along with others, dispossessed the local Bedouins. The Sursocks soon began to repopulate long-abandoned villages with tenant sharecroppers. Most of those were located in the outskirts of the valley.

According to Frances E. Newton's testimony at the Shaw Commission noted the genesis of the Sursock purchase: "...these lands came into the possession of Sursock through a loan he had made to the Turkish Government. The Turkish Government never had any intention of turning the Arabs off the land, it was more of a sort of mortgage, and Sursock was collecting the tithes interest on his money... Sursock did not become possessed of the lands by virtue of Title Deeds in the original instance. Later Sursock applied to the Government to give him title deeds."

In 1878, Claude Reignier Conder explained as follows:

One curious fact, as showing the infamous condition of the administration, we here also ascertained. A Greek banker named Sursuk, to whom the Government was under obligations, was allowed to buy the northern half of the Great Plain and some of the Nazareth villages for the ridiculously small sum of £20,000 for an extent of seventy square miles; the taxes of the twenty villages amounted to £4000, so that the average income could not be stated at less than £12,000, taking good and bad years together. The cultivation was materially improved under his care, and the property must be immensely valuable, or would be, if the title could be considered secure; but it is highly probable that the Government will again seize the land when it becomes worth while to do so. The peasantry attributed the purchase to Russian intrigue, being convinced that their hated enemy has his eyes greedily turned to Palestine and to Jerusalem as a religious capital, and is ever busy in gaining a footing in the country.

=== Newer perspectives ===
Drawing on newly opened Sursock papers, historian Kristen Alff (2023) states that in 1869 the Sursocks paid Ottoman Governor of Syria Rashid Pasha and other officials 17,000 Ottoman lira, only 6,000 of which reached the treasury, to have more than twenty villages recorded as "unclaimed" and transferred at the costly 'bedel‑i mişl' rate (literally "equivalent price", a market‑value fee imposed on supposedly ownerless land and set far above the ordinary 'harç‑ı mutat' one‑time registration charge), thereby blocking Palestinian cultivators from securing cheaper deeds. This meant that when village mukhtars and the Acre Administrative Council tried to overturn those registrations, ministries in Istanbul issued special decrees that upheld the elite claims. Therefore, by 1872 only a fraction of the original land deeds had been restored, while the Sursocks retained dominant shares of the valley's most fertile plots. In Alff's view, these survey‑era maneuvers, namely selective registration, what she deems 'bribery' and metropolitan protection, created the legal scaffolding that later Zionist buyers would use, even though large‑scale physical eviction of Palestinian peasants had not yet begun.

== Jewish purchases ==
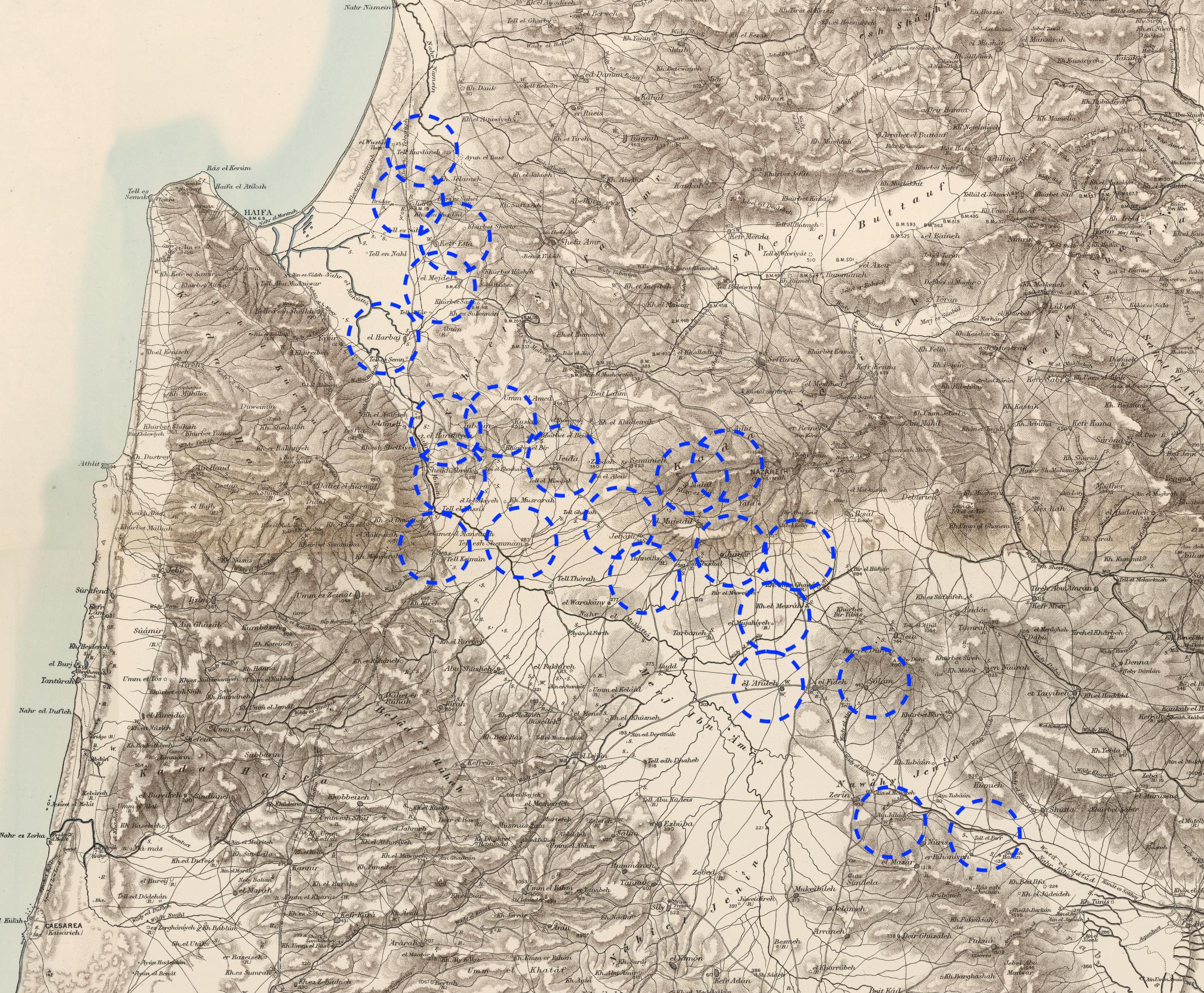
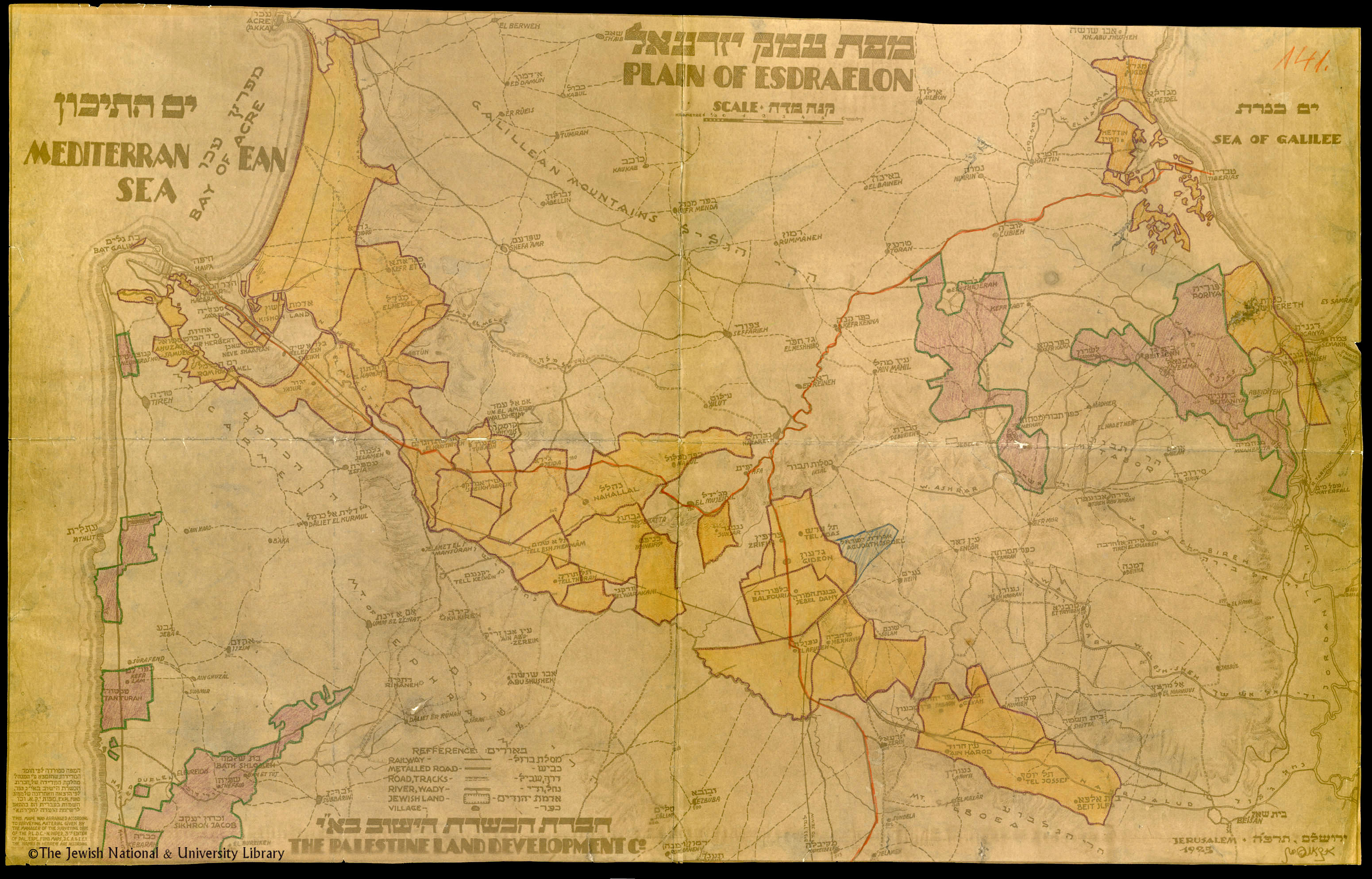
Illustrations of the Sursock Purchase before and after; A) the first map shows the Palestinian villages which were sold (circled in blue) marked on the older 1870s SWP map; B) the second one is a 1925 Palestine Land Development Company map showing the Sursock Purchase lands in yellow, with some of the then-new Jewish settlements.

=== Early discussions ===
In 1891, Yehoshua Hankin, who had immigrated to Palestine from Russia a few years previously, began negotiations to acquire the Jezreel Valley; the negotiations ended when the Ottoman government enacted a prohibition on Jewish immigration.

On 10 March 1897, Theodor Herzl wrote about the Sursock family in his diary, noting the onset of negotiations with the Jewish Colonisation Association for the purchase of 97 villages in Palestine:

The Jewish Colonisation Association is currently negotiating with a Greek family (Soursouk is the name, I think) for the purchase of 97 villages in Palestine. These Greeks live in Paris, have gambled away their money, and wish to sell their real estate (3 % of the entire area of Palestine, according to Bambus) for 7 million francs.

The Zionist Organization considered the Jezreel Valley as the most strategically attractive area to acquire, even more so than the coastal region of Palestine. This is because of the opportunity to carry out large scale agriculture in the area, and the speed at which settlement could be carried out due to the large landowners; in the coastal region smaller parcels of land were available for purchase, and the land was less fertile. The Ottoman government made a number of attempts to limit mass land acquisition and immigration, but these restrictions did not last long due to European pressure under the terms of the capitulations.

=== 1901 Jewish Colonisation Association purchases ===
In 1901, the Jewish Colonisation Association, having been blocked from land purchases in the Mutasarrifate of Jerusalem, made its first major purchase in the north of Palestine in an acquisition of 31,500 dunums of land near Tiberias from the Sursock family and their partners.

=== 1910–1911 Fula affair ===
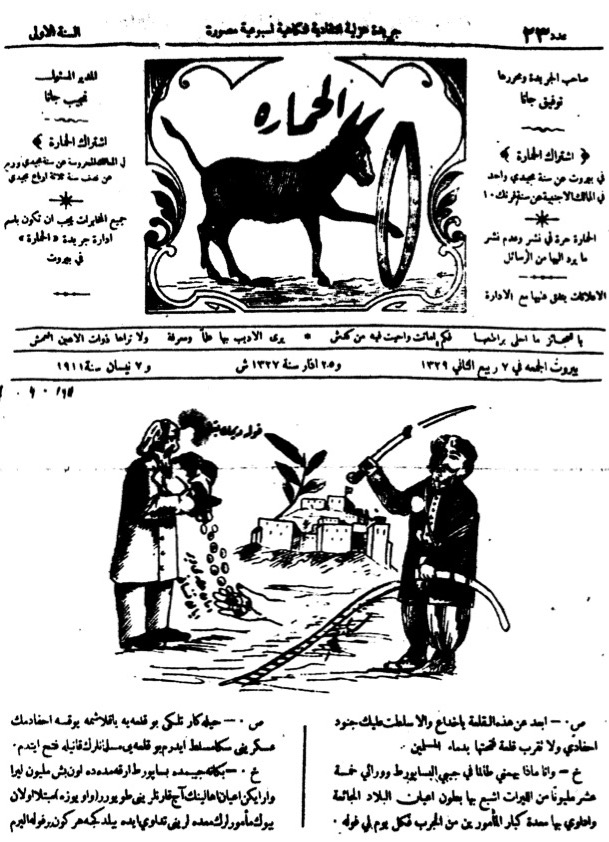
1911 cartoon: Saladin (right) protesting the Sursocks' sale of Al Fula, and Yehoshua Hankin (left) handing out money. Haifa satirical newspaper al Himara al Qahira ("The Stubborn Donkey").

Another of the early Zionist purchases from the Sursocks became known as the "Fula affair" (sometimes erroneously referred to as the "Afula affair," and also called sometimes "the al-Fula incident"). In 1910–11, Elias Sursock sold 10,000 dunums around the village of al-Fula, located at the foot of the Nazareth mountains in Marj Ibn 'Amir, to the Jewish National Fund. The Palestinian peasants refused to leave the land and the qaimaqam (district governor) of Nazareth, Shukri al-Asali fought to overturn the sale, and refused to finalize the transaction. The villagers themselves sent a petition to the grand vizier complaining of the oppressive use of arbitrary power (tahakkum). In particular, they claimed that Ilyas Sursuk and a middleman had sold their land to people, whom they called "Zionists" and "sons of the religion of Moses" (siyonist musevi), who were not Ottoman subjects, and that the sale would deprive 1,000 villagers of their livelihoods. In earlier petitions concerning land disputes, Jews had been customarily referred to as "Israelites" (Isra'iliyyun).

The existence of a Saladin-era Crusader castle located within the land area was used to allude to the battle against the Crusaders in opposing the land sale. Palestinians made speeches in opposition in Ottoman Parliament and numerous newspaper articles were published on the subject as well. As put by historian Rashid Khalidi, "the important thing was not whether the ruin had originally been built by Saladin: it was that these newspapers' readers believed that part of the heritage of Saladin, savior of Palestine from the Crusaders, was being sold off (by implication, to the "new Crusaders") without the Ottoman government lifting a finger."

The political activity against the sale is considered to be "the first concerted action against the growing Zionist activities", and the sale can be considered "in this context the most significant event that took place in the period before the outbreak of the First World War."

=== 1918 purchase ===
The Ottomans had refused to authorize numerous sales, such that the Sursocks were unable to sell significant land to Jewish purchasers prior to World War I. In 1912, the Palestine Land Development Company (PLDC) arranged to purchase a large area in the Jezreel Valley from Nagib and Albert Sursock, but the transaction did not complete due to World War I. On 18 December 1918, the agreement was concluded; it covered 71,356 dunams in the Jezreel Valley, including Tel Adashim.

=== 1921–1925, and depopulation ===
Following the start of the British Mandate, the Land Transfer Ordinance, 1920, removed all such restrictions. Between 1921 and 1925 the Sursock family sold their 80,000 acres (320 km^{2}) of land in the Vale of Jezreel to the American Zion Commonwealth (AZC) for nearly 750,000 pounds. The land was purchased by the Jewish organization as part of an effort to resettle Jews who inhabited the land, as well as others who came from distant lands. In 1924 the Palestine Jewish Colonization Association (PICA) was established to take over the role of the Jewish Colonisation Association; PICA became the largest Jewish landowner in Palestine. In parallel, the PLDC acted as the purchasing organization for the Jewish National Fund. The high priority given to these lands owes much to the strategy pursued by Menachem Ussishkin, who found himself opposed by other members of the JNF board. The result of the costly purchase was that much of the organization's capital was tied up for the ensuing decade.

Under the British Mandate, the land laws were rewritten, and the Palestinian farmers in the region were deemed tenant farmers by the British authorities. In the face of local opposition, the right of the Sursocks to sell the land and displace its population was upheld by the authorities. A number of purchased villages, particularly those in the Jezreel Valley, were inhabited by tenants of land who were displaced following the sale. The buyers demanded the existing population be relocated and as a result, the Palestinian Arab tenant farmers were evicted, with some receiving compensation the buyers were not required to pay under the new British Mandate law. Although they were not legally owed any compensation, the evicted tenants (1,746 Arab farmer families comprising 8,730 persons in the largest group of purchases), were compensated with $17 per person (approx. $300 in 2024 dollars).

Despite the sale, some former tenants refused to leave, such as in Afula. However, the new owners considered it was inappropriate for these farmers to remain as tenants on land intended for Jewish labor, driven in particular by the working-the-land ideology of the Yishuv. British police carried out eviction orders, forcing the farmers from their former homes. Through the 1930s, dispossessed fellahin made their way to the coast in search of work, with most ending up in shanty towns on the edges of Jaffa and Haifa.

The Sursock Purchase became a focus of the 1930 Shaw Commission. Palestinian American Saleem Raji Farah, son of a previous mayor of Nazareth, prepared a detailed table of the Sursock purchases as evidence for the commission showing 1,746 families displaced from 240,000 dunums of land; the information in this table is shown below:

Village	Sub-district	Dunums	Feddans	Families	Price	Date	Seller	Modern location
Tel-el-Adas	Nazareth	22,000	120	150	£40,000	1921	Heirs of George Lutfalah Sursock	Tel Adashim
Jalud and Tel el Fer	Nazareth	30,000	230	280	£191,000	1921	Najeeb and Albert Sursock	Ma'ayan Harod
Mahloul	Nazareth	16,000	72	90	£47,000	1921	Najeeb and Albert Sursock	IDF base (Nahalal is nearby)
Sofsafe-Ain-Sheika	Nazareth	16,000	72	90	£47,000	1921	Najeeb and Albert Sursock	Kfar HaHoresh
Ain-Beida & Mokbey	Nazareth	3,000	20	25	£9,000	1921	Najeeb and Albert Sursock	Yokneam Moshava
Jinjar	Nazareth	4,000	20	25	£13,000	1921	Najeeb and Albert Sursock	Ginegar
Rob-el-Nasreh	Nazareth	7,000	40	50	£21,000	1921	Najeeb and Albert Sursock	Mizra
ʿAfula	Nazareth	16,000	90	130	£56,000	1924	Heirs of Michel Ibrahim Sursock	Afula
Jabata	Nazareth	11,000	72	90	£32,000	1925	Heirs of Kaleels and Jobran Sursock	Gvat
Kneifis	Nazareth	9,000	50	60	£26,000	1925	Heirs of Kaleels and Jobran Sursock	Sarid
Sulam (two thirds only)	Nazareth	6,000	35	45	£40,000	1925	Heirs of Kaleels and Jobran Sursock and partners	Sulam
Jedro	Acre	52,000	250	300	£15,000	1925	Alfred Sursock	Kiryat Yam
Kordaneh	Acre	1,500	15	20	£9,000	1925	Alfred Sursock	Tel Afek
Kefr Etta	Acre	10,000	60	75	£3,000	1925	Alfred Sursock	Kiryat Ata
Majdal	Acre	9,000	50	70	£27,000	1925	Alfred Sursock	Ramat Yohanan
Jaida	Haifa	15,000	75	110	£45,000	1925	Heirs of Tueni family (Sursocks partners)	Ramat Yishai
Tel-el-Shemmam	Haifa	8,000	40	50	£25,000	1925	Heirs of Tueni family (Sursocks partners)	Kfar Yehoshua
Subtotal (excluding those below)		219,500	1,239	1,570	599,000			
Hartieh	Haifa	n.a.	50	60	n.a.	1925	Alexander Sursock	Sha'ar HaAmakim
Sheikh Bureik	Haifa	n.a.	40	50	n.a.	1925	Alexander Sursock	Beit She'arim National Park
Harbaj	Haifa	n.a.	70	90	n.a.	1925	Alexander Sursock	Kfar Hasidim
Kiskis and Tabon	Haifa	n.a.	30	36	n.a.	1925	Heirs of Matta Farah (Sursocks partners)	Kiryat Tiv'on

Other villages sold by the Sursocks included:

- Khirbat al-Shuna
- Malhamiyah (became Menahemia)

== Jewish settlements ==
Following the purchase of the land, the Jewish farmers created the first modern-day settlements such as the city of Afula and drained the swamps to enable further land development of areas that had been uninhabitable for centuries. The country's first moshav, Nahalal, was settled in this valley on 11 September 1921. Moshe Dayan, who grew up in Nahalal, mentioned the moshav – together with three other locations which had been part of the Sursock Purchase – as examples of there being "not one place built in this country which did not have a former Arab population":

We came to this country which was already populated by Arabs, and we are establishing a Hebrew, that is a Jewish, state here... Jewish villages were built in the place of Arab villages. You do not even know the names of the Arab villages, and I do not blame you, because these geography books no longer exists; not only do the books not exist [but] the Arab villages are not there either. Nahalal arose in the place of Mahalul, Gvat in the place of Jibta, Sarid in the place of Haneifs, and Kfar Yehoshua in the place of Tell Shaman. There is not one place built in this country that did not have a former Arab population.

— Moshe Dayan, Haaretz, 4 April 1969

== See also ==
- Hula Concession purchase

== Bibliography ==
- Avneri, Aryeh L. (1982). The Claim of Dispossession: Jewish Land-Settlement and the Arabs, 1878–1948. Transaction Publishers. ISBN 978-1-4128-3621-0.
- Ben-Bassat, Yuval (May 2013). "Rural Reactions to Zionist Activity in Palestine before and after the Young Turk Revolution of 1908 as Reflected in Petitions to Istanbul". Middle Eastern Studies. 49 (3): 349–363. doi:10.1080/00263206.2013.783823. JSTOR 23471075. S2CID 144522522.
- ESCO Foundation (1947), Palestine – A Study Of Jewish Arab And British Policies, vol. II, Yale University Press
- Glass, Joseph B. (5 February 2018). From New Zion to Old Zion: American Jewish Immigration and Settlement in Palestine, 1917–1939. Wayne State University Press. ISBN 978-0-8143-4422-4.
- Great Britain. Commission on the Palestine Disturbances of August 1929 (1930). Palestine Commission on the Disturbances of August, 1929. H.M. Stationery Office.
- Hadawi, Sami (1988). Palestinian Rights and Losses in 1948: A Comprehensive Study. Saqi Books. ISBN 978-0-86356-157-3.
- Hadawi, Sami (1970). Village Statistics, 1945: A Classification of Land and Area Ownership in Palestine, with Explanatory Notes. PLO Research Center.
- Khalidi, Rashid (1997). Palestinian Identity: The Construction of Modern National Consciousness. Columbia University Press. ISBN 978-0-231-10515-6.
- Schölch, A.; 'European Penetration and the Economic Development of Palestine, 1856–82,' in Roger Owen (ed.),Studies in the Economic and Social History of Palestine in the Nineteenth and Twentieth Centuries, Springer, 1982 ISBN 978-1-349-05700-9 pp. 10–86 esp pp. 21ff
- Schölch, A. (1993). Palestine in Transformation, 1856–1882: Studies in Social, Economic, and Political Development (PDF). Institute for Palestine Studies. ISBN 978-0-88728-234-8.
- Sursock House: Rothschild Land Purchases and Early Israel
- Trombetta, Lorenzo (2009). "The private archive of the sursuqs, a Beirut family of Christian notables: An early inspection". Rivista degli studi orientali. 82 (1/4): 197–228. JSTOR 41913265.
