= Yehoshua Hankin =

Russian Zionist activist (1864–1945)

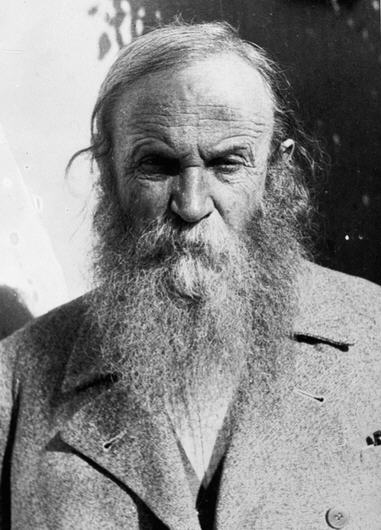
- Hankin in 1945
- Born: 1864; Kremenchuk, Russian Empire
- Died: 11 November 1945 (aged 80–81); Tel Aviv, Mandatory Palestine
- Occupation: Zionist activist
- Known for: Major land purchases for the World Zionist Organization
- Spouse: Olga Belkind

Yehoshua Hankin (Hebrew: יהושע חנקין; 1864 – 11 November 1945) was a Zionist activist who was responsible for most of the major land purchases of the Zionist Organization in Ottoman Palestine and Mandatory Palestine – in particular for the Sursock Purchase.

== Biography ==
Yehoshua Hankin was born in Kremenchuk, Russian Empire, and moved to Rishon LeZion with his parents in 1882. In 1887, his family moved to Gedera. In 1888, Hankin married Olga Belkind (1852–1943) in Gedera. She was a woman twelve years his senior, who would become his partner in all his endeavors. Givat Olga, a neighborhood of Hadera, is named after her. Their marriage remained childless. Hankin died in Tel Aviv and was buried in the Galilee next to his wife Olga, at the house ("Bet Hankin") he had built for them at Ein Harod on Mount Gilboa.

== Land purchases ==
While living in Gedera, Hankin became friendly with local Arabs, helping him negotiate the purchase of land. Hankin's first purchase was the land of Rehovot, acquired in 1890. A year later, using funds provided by the Hovevei Zion associations in Vilnius and Kaunasa, he bought the land that later became the settlement and city of Hadera. According to Roy Marom, this "purchase was the largest land acquisition operation for Jewish settlement to date." Hankin soon settled in one of Hadera’s satellite estates. He then purchased territories for the Jewish Colonial Association in the Galilee.

In 1908, when the Zionist organization sent Arthur Ruppin and set up the Palestine Land Development Company, Hankin joined. In 1909 or 1910, Hankin completed his first major purchase in the Jezreel Valley. He bought some 10,000 dunams (10 km²) of land in Al-Fuleh, which became the home of Merhavia. This purchase also marked the start of bitter disputes between Arabs and Jews over the rights of tenant farmers who had been evicted, and regarding the employment of Jewish or Arab watchmen for the land.

In his article, Buying the Emek, Arthur Ruppin described the vicissitudes of this purchase:

In order to execute this plan the Jaffa office communicated with Messrs. Kalvariski and Joshua Hankin. The latter, then a young man of twenty-five had already demonstrated his skill in such negotiations in the acquisition of land for the colonies Rehoboth and Hederah. By energetic work he succeeded, in 1891, in reaching an agreement with large owners in the Emek Jezreel and the Plain of Acco for the purchase of 160,000 dunams [160 km²] at 15 francs per dunam [15,000 franc/km²]....Before the consummation of the agreement, however the Turkish Government, alarmed by the increasing inflow of Russian Jews, prohibited Jewish immigration entirely. This blow proved disastrous for the negotiations. The Russian societies formed for the purposes of purchasing land were dissolved, failed to send in the money they had promised, and the entire magnificent project fell through...It was only in 1910 that Hankin -- who, in the meanwhile, had purchased land in Lower Galilee for the ICA -- resumed his negotiations for land in the Emek.

Because of the reluctance of Zionist organizations to pay for land, Hankin frequently agreed to purchase lands and then convinced the Jewish agency or others to finance the "done deal." As Ruppin notes:

Authorized by a Russian Jew, Elias Blumenfeld, to arrange for the purchase of 1,000 dunams [1 km²] on which he, Blumenfeld, intended to establish a farm with his own means, Hankin concluded an agreement for a stretch of 9,500 dunams [9.5 km²] in Fule, later Merchavia [Al-Ful in Arabic]. He hoped that the ICA, in whose employ he was at that time, would buy the remainder of the land. When, however, the ICA refused to do so, he inquired of me, who was then the director of the Palestine Bureau of the Zionist Organization, whether the Zionists would be prepared to purchase this land. Even before that it had occurred to me, whenever, going from Haifa to Nazareth, I had viewed the broad expanse of the Emek Yizrael, that, because of its proximity to Haifa, its excellent railroad and highway connections, and the ease with which its soil could be cultivated, this land would be preeminently suited for Jewish colonization.

But it was no simple matter to obtain the money for this purchase. Only the fact that Franz Oppenheimer was just then seeking land for the co-operative colonization society he had recently organized, and the simultaneous appearance of some private purchasers, made it possible to carry through this project. 3,500 dunams [3.5 km²] were taken over by the National Fund for the co-operative colonies, and the rest by the Palestine Land Development Company.

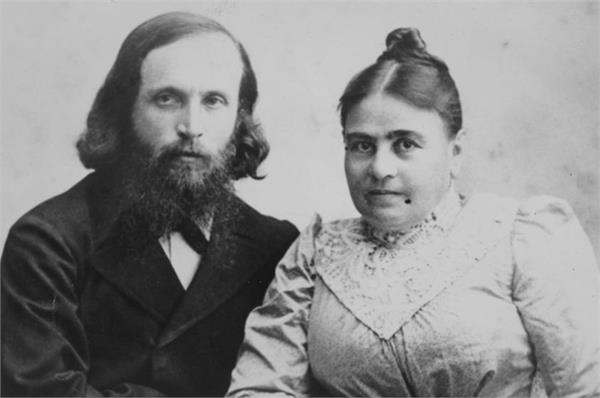
Yehoshua and Olga Hankin 1910

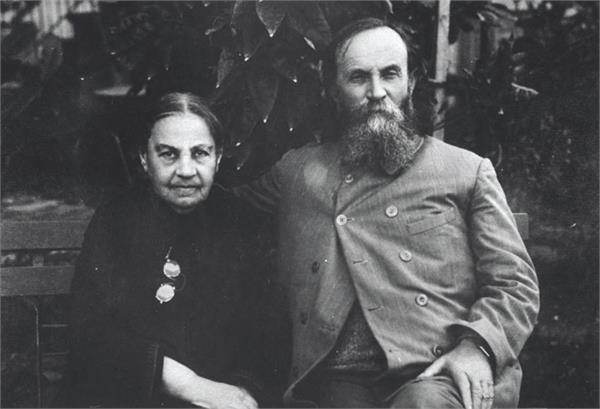
Yehoshua and Olga Hankin 1920

During World War I, Hankin was exiled by the Turks to Anatolia. Returning to Palestine, he soon resumed his work where he had left off. In 1920, he concluded a deal with the Sursock family of Beirut for purchase of 60,000 dunams (60 km²) of land in the Jezreel Valley. He negotiated for this land when he had in fact not a penny to finance the purchase. The chairman of the Jewish National Fund, Nehemia De Lieme, refused to pay for the land, arguing that it was beyond the budget of the Fund, but he was overruled by the Zionist organization and in particular Chaim Weizmann. This tract became home to numerous new kibbutzim and other settlements, including Nahalal, Ginegar, Kfar Yehezkel, Geva, Ein Harod, Tel Yosef and Beit Alfa.

A number of villages in the Jezreel Valley were inhabited by tenants of land who were displaced following the sale. The JNF demanded the existing population be relocated and as a result, the Palestinian Arab tenant farmers were evicted, with some receiving compensation the buyers were not required to pay under the new British Mandate law. Although they were not legally owed any compensation, the evicted tenants (1,746 Arab farmer families comprising 8,730 persons in the largest group of purchases), were compensated with $17 per person (approx. $300 in 2024 dollars).

Subsequently, Hankin was involved in large scale purchases of land in and around Acco. In 1927, Hankin proposed an ambitious 20 year land purchase plan to the Jewish Agency for Israel, a plan that was never carried out in full. In 1932, he became head of the Palestine Land Development Corporation.

Hankin understood the necessity to plan for Arab as well as Jewish settlement, and apparently intended to do so. In July 1930, he wrote:

...Had we desired to disregard the interests of such workers of the land as are dependent, directly or indirectly, upon lands of the landlords, we could have acquired large and unlimited areas, but in the course of our conversation I have pointed out to you that this has not been our policy and that, when acquiring lands, it is our ardent wish not to prejudice or do harm to the interests of anybody. (Quoted by Sir John Hope Simpson in his report of 1930 ).

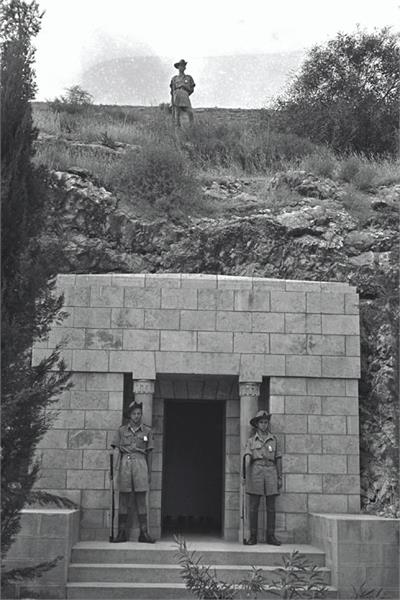
Yehoshua Hankin’s tomb Ein Harod 1946
