= Hula Concession purchase =

1934 acquisition of land and concession in northern Mandatory Palestine

The Hula Concession (see yellow hashed area) illustrated on a map of Jewish land purchase in Palestine in the Galilee Panhandle as at 1944; the dark blue represents land then owned by the Jewish National Fund, and the yellow area by the Palestine Land Development Company and other private owners

Lake Hula region in the 1930s-40s Survey of Palestine

The Hula Concession purchase was the acquisition by the Palestine Land Development Company (PLDC) of the land and rights to drain and reclaim Lake Hula and its surrounding marshes in northern Mandatory Palestine in 1934. One of a number of concessions in Mandatory Palestine, it had originally been granted by the Ottoman Empire in 1914 and was subsequently held by the Syro-Ottoman Agricultural Company, a group of mostly Beirut-based investors headed by Salim Ali Salam, to whom the PLDC agreed to pay £191,974 for the concessionary rights.

The concession covered approximately 56,940 metric dunams, or about one-third of the Hula Valley. It was a drainage and reclamation concession over state land, with an option to acquire the land. Under the original agreement, the concessionaires were to purchase the reclaimed land from the government at a pre-agreed price after draining it and bringing it under cultivation.

The British administration formally approved the transfer on 29 September 1934, and the concession area was handed over to the PLDC on 29 November. The conditions included the reservation of 15,772 metric dunams for Arab cultivators and required the new concessionaires to meet the cost of draining and irrigating that land without recovering those costs from the cultivators.

The purchase did not result in the immediate drainage of the lake and marshes. Financing difficulties, negotiations over government participation, competing water rights and political conflict delayed the scheme, and no major drainage work was undertaken before 1948.

== Background ==
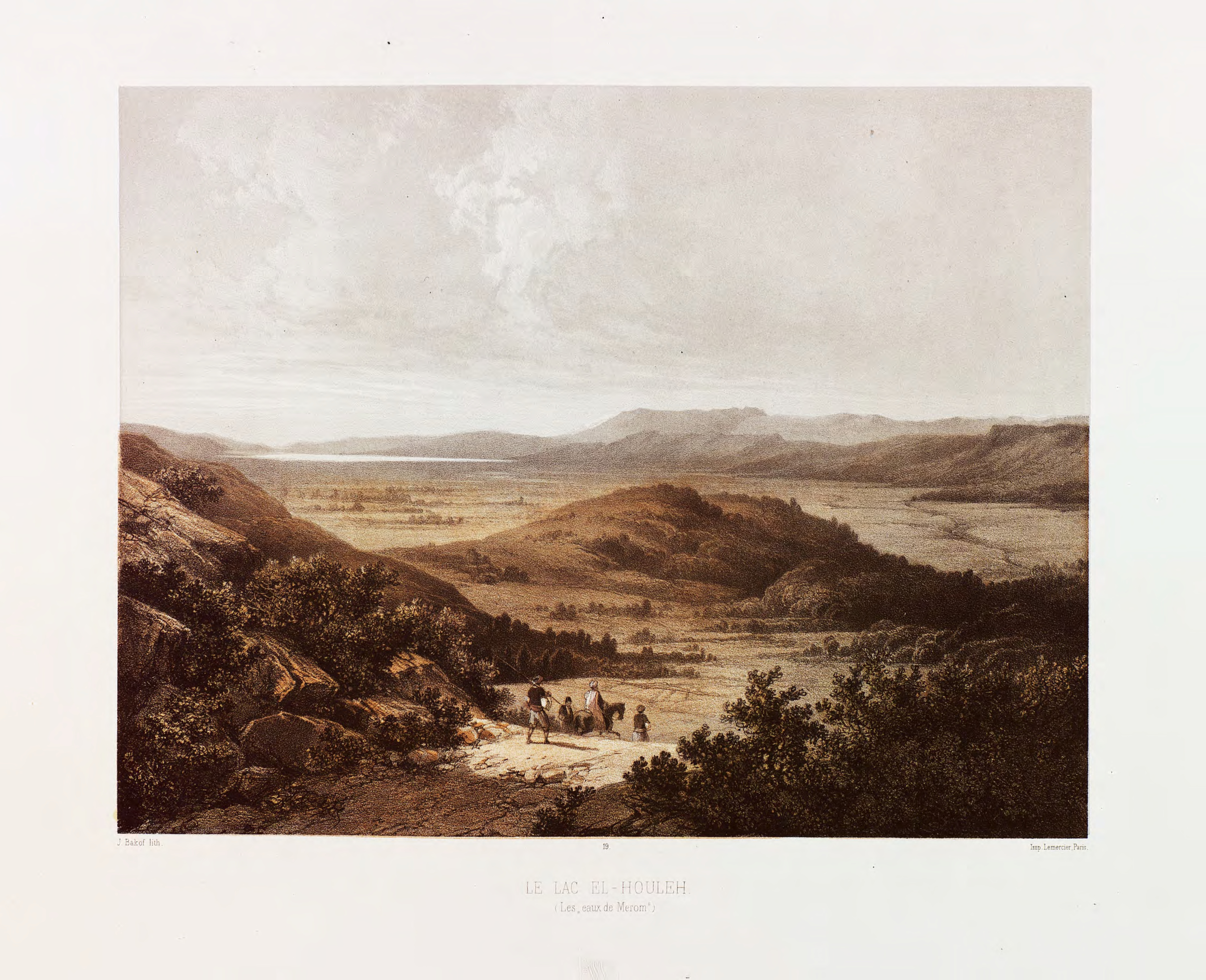
1857 image, Le Lac el-Houleh, by Charles William Meredith van de Velde

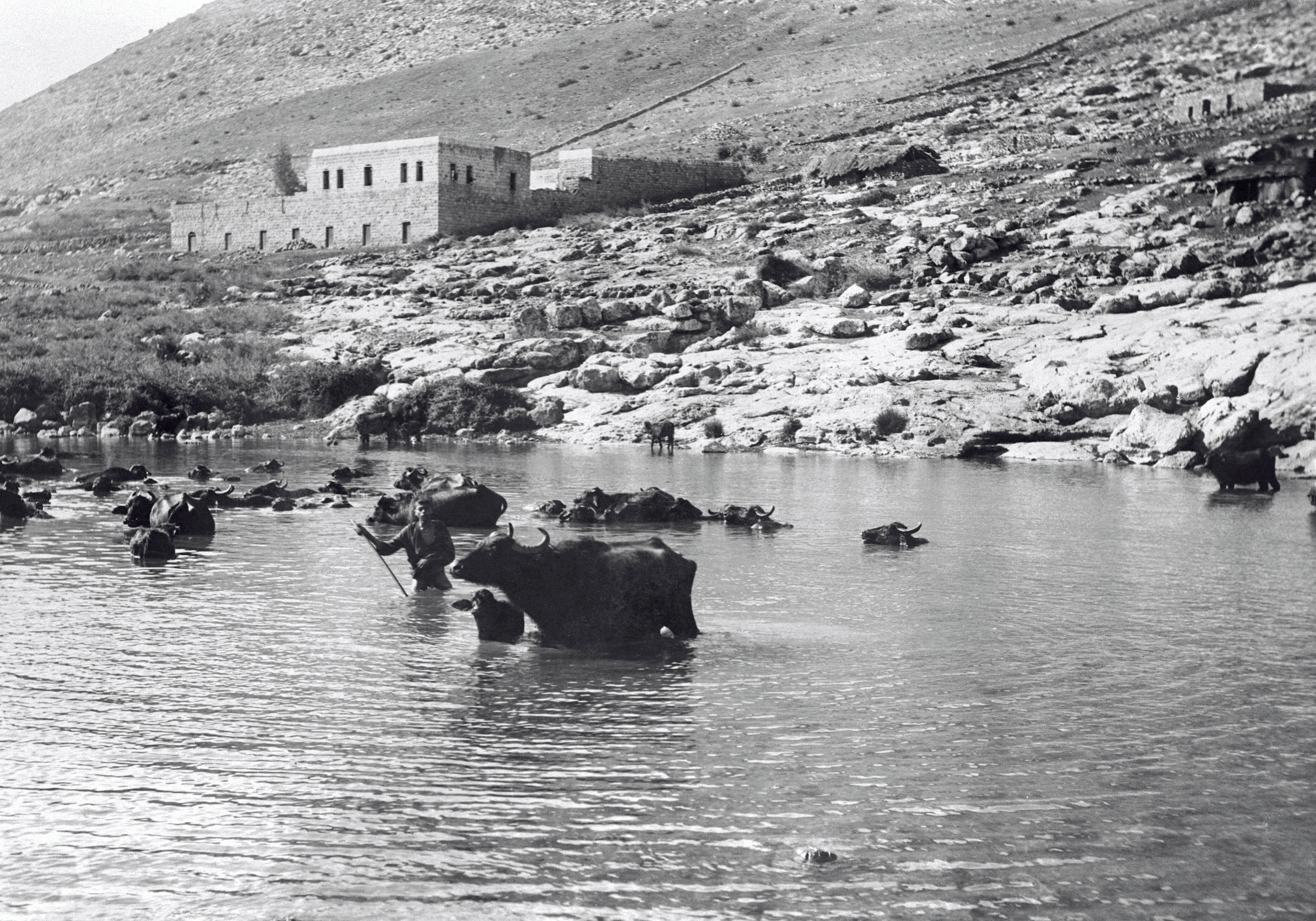
1923 water buffalo husbandry in the lake

1946 papyrus harvesting in the lake

The Hula Valley formed the northernmost section of the Jordan rift valley within Mandatory Palestine. Before drainage, it included Lake Hula, permanent marshes, seasonally flooded land to the north and comparatively dry land south of the lake. A basaltic barrier south of the lake restricted the discharge of the Jordan River, contributing to winter flooding.

The marshes supported an existing economy based on cultivation, fishing, water buffalo husbandry and papyrus harvesting. Papyrus was used to make mats and baskets, construct homes and provide other household materials. Glenna Anton wrote that these activities formed part of a relationship in which the inhabitants and the wetland environment shaped one another, rather than the marshes constituting an unused landscape awaiting development.

Whilst malaria was a public-health problem in the valley, the marshes were essential to local livelihoods. Anton cites the statement of Arab farmers that their opposition to drainage reflected concern about losing the resources on which their herds depended: “It's better to die from malaria than from hunger, because our existence depends on the herds which need the swamps”.

== Ottoman grant of the concession ==
Huleh Concession (Boundaries) Ordinance, 1938: "(1) The Reserved Area shall be and be deemed to be the area or areas marked in red on a survey plan deposited with the District Commissioner, Northern District, dated the 22nd day of July, 1937, and signed by the Commissioner for Lands and Surveys. (2) The Unreserved Concession Area shall be and be deemed to be the area marked in blue on the survey plan aforesaid."

In June 1914, the Ottoman authorities granted a concession for the drainage and reclamation of the Hula marshes. The original concessionaires were Michel Ibrahim Sursock and Muhammad Umar Bayhum; who sold it in 1918 to another consortium of businessmen. Saqr Abu Fakhr, writing in The New Arab, described Salim Ali Salam as the chairman selected for the company established to acquire and undertake the concession in 1918.

The agreement required the submission of plans and maps within one year, the commencement of drainage within six months of approval and completion within six years. Once the land had been drained and brought under cultivation, the company was to purchase it at two Turkish pounds per Turkish dunam. The agreement also protected the rights of cultivators who had already reclaimed approximately 10,000 Turkish dunams within the concession area.

The outbreak of the First World War interrupted the project. German engineers engaged by the concessionaires were unable to complete their survey work during the war, and a postponement was authorized in October 1915. After the war, the concessionaires applied to the British authorities for recognition of their Ottoman rights.

== PLDC purchase ==
=== Early discussions ===
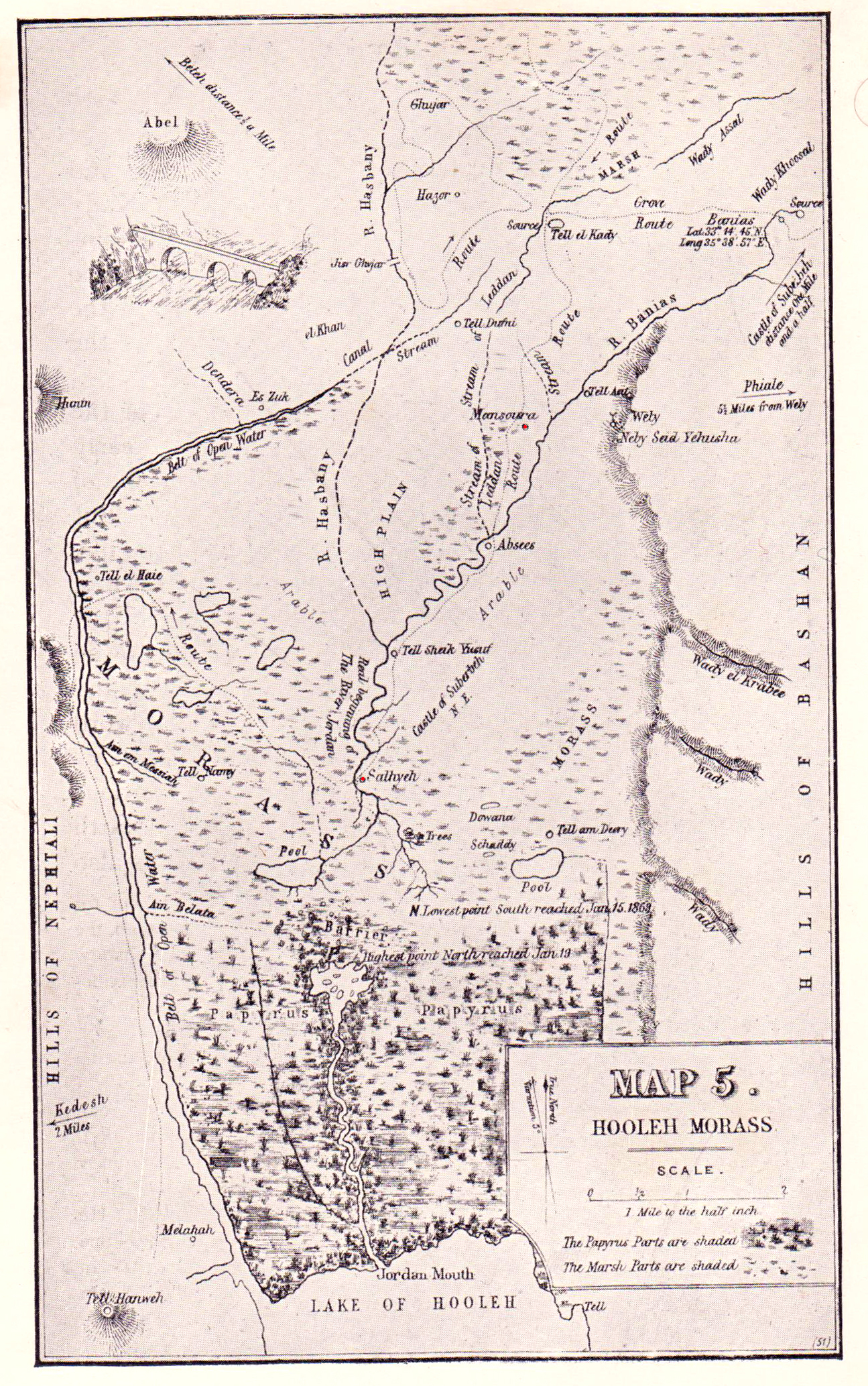
John MacGregor's map, January 1869

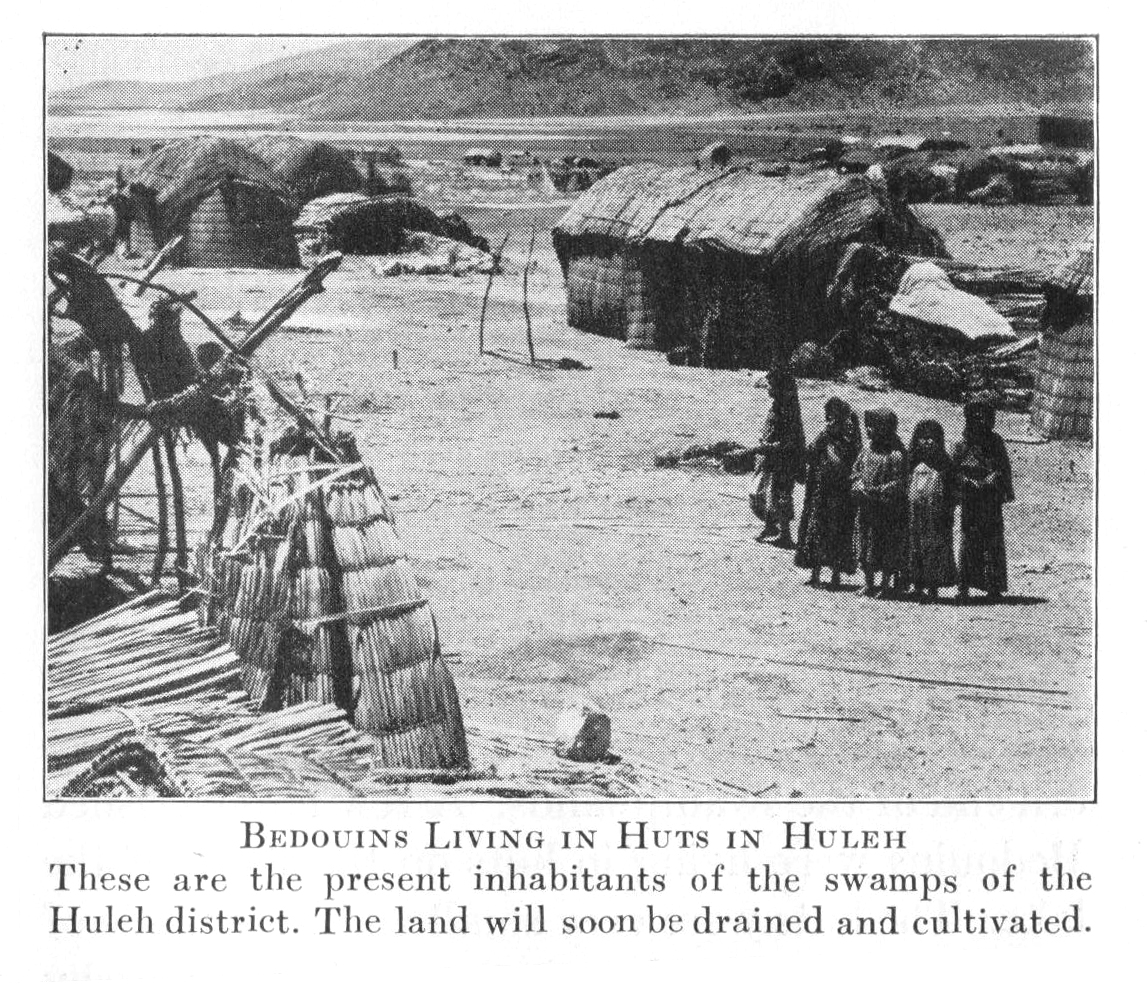
Hula Bedouin, 1935

Recognition of the concession was complicated by the transition from Ottoman rule, the settlement of Palestine's northern boundary and competing proposals for water development. High Commissioner Herbert Samuel opposed the sale of state land to the Arab owners as envisaged by the concession, preferring a long-term lease. He also worked to manage a possible conflict with Pinhas Rutenberg's hydroelectric concession for the First Jordan Hydro-Electric Power House.

In February 1924, an agreement provided for the surrender of the Ottoman concession and the establishment of a limited-liability company with authorized capital of at least £250,000 and subscribed capital of at least £50,000. The concessionaires were unable to raise the required capital, and the Mandate authorities granted an extension.

Negotiations with the Zionist Organization followed. In 1925, the organization offered £5,000 for an option to purchase the concession for £90,000. An engineering investigation subsequently indicated that reclamation would be substantially more expensive than earlier estimates had suggested, and the proposed acquisition was abandoned. In December 1925, a confidential note from Leo Amery, Secretary of State for the Colonies, to Herbert Plumer, High Commissioner for Palestine, noted an instruction from Plumer against taking steps that could be construed as official pressure on the concessionaires to sell to the Zionists.

=== 1929–1933 developments ===
After the proposed replacement agreement lapsed, the original Ottoman concession was revived, and the company was reinstated in the concession area on 1 January 1929. Drainage proposals were submitted in June, but disagreements over technical requirements prevented immediate progress.

In January 1931, the administration served notice requiring the commencement of the approved works within six months and completion within six years. Work included the replacement of the Banat Ya'qub bridge, whose arches restricted the flow of water from the lake, and the deepening of the Jordan channel.

The prospects for a Jewish acquisition changed in 1933. British officials supported renewed negotiations, and Yehoshua Hankin signed a preliminary deed on behalf of the PLDC in May. A contract for acquisition was completed on 20 November 1933, allowing time to arrange financing and obtain official authorization for the transfer.

=== 1934 purchase and conditions ===
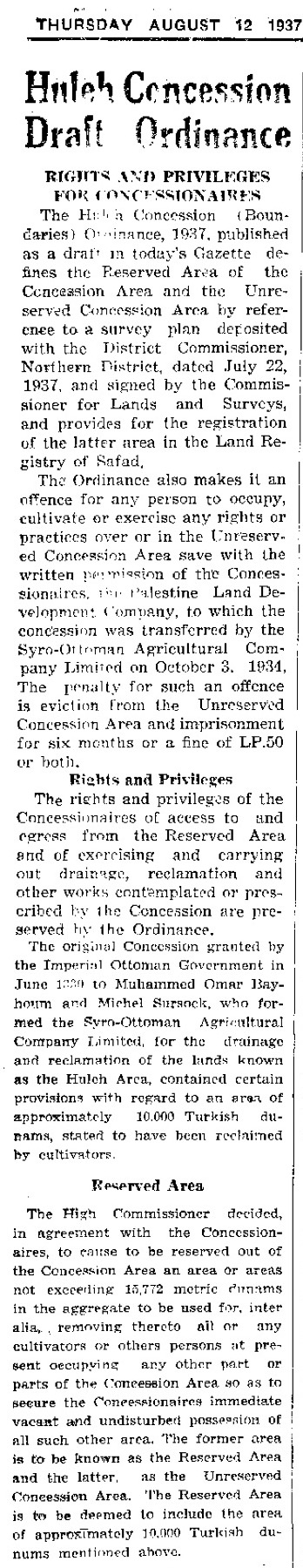
Palestine Post article on the Huleh Concession 12 August 1937

The acquisition required an investigation of the concession boundaries and the rights of existing cultivators. British enquiries recorded increasing estimates of the land under cultivation, and the administration ultimately reserved 15,772 metric dunams for approximately 1,100 Arab families cultivating within the concession area. Tyler calculates that this represented 27.7 per cent of the concession.

The transfer conditions required the PLDC to bear the entire cost of reclamation within the concession, including drainage and irrigation of the cultivators' reservation. The company also assumed liabilities owed to the government by the previous concessionaires. Approval did not commit the government to drainage or anti-malarial works outside the concession area.

Formal approval was granted on 29 September 1934, followed by the handover on 29 November. In a public statement issued on 1 December, High Commissioner Arthur Wauchope defended the transfer on the grounds that the new concessionaires possessed greater financial resources and would be required to drain the land reserved for Arab cultivators without charging them for the work.

According to Tyler's 1994 account, the PLDC made an initial payment of £60,000 and contracted to pay a further £156,438, comprising the balance of the purchase price and interest, during 1935–1939.

=== Differing accounts of the transfer ===
Accounts differ over the role of British pressure and the legal form of the final transaction.

The accounts of Salim Ali Salam and his son, Saeb Salam, present the outcome as a surrender of the concession to the Mandate government under pressure, in return for compensation bonds payable over seven years. He states that the shareholders stipulated that 22,000 dunams already drained by Palestinian cultivators should become their property. These figures and the description of the transaction differ from Tyler's account.

== Jewish settlements ==
The purchase encouraged further Jewish land acquisition in the valley and its surrounding hills. The Jewish National Fund first began purchasing land in the region at the end of 1935; its holdings increased from 344 dunams at the outbreak of the 1936 disturbances to a claimed 84,000 dunams in the region by 1946. Settlements were established as follows:

- Hulata, on the southern shores of Lake Hula, in 1937
- Dafna, Dan, Amir and Beit Hillel, north of the concession, in 1939–1940.

British officials interpreted the wider acquisition and settlement campaign as a means of reinforcing Jewish claims to the region, strengthening the northern frontier and gaining control of the Jordan headwaters.

== Drainage works ==
The reclamation scheme remained difficult to finance. A report submitted by Rendel, Palmer and Tritton in July 1936 estimated that draining, irrigating and sanitizing the entire basin would cost £933,000. Its investigation also found that the soil within the concession was poorer than anticipated and that the best soil lay within the area reserved for Arab cultivators.

Negotiations continued over the government's contribution, the formation of a financing consortium and the competing rights of the Palestine Electric Corporation. The 1936–1939 Arab revolt in Palestine, partition proposals and the Second World War further delayed the project. A proposed British contribution of £235,000 was authorized in principle in August 1939 but withdrawn after the outbreak of war.

== Legacy ==
The drainage project was carried out after the establishment of Israel and completed in 1958. Anton links its implementation to the displacement and expulsion of Arab residents in 1948 and the removal of the administrative obstacles that had existed under the Mandate. She also notes subsequent ecological damage as a legacy of the works, alongside the as agricultural improvement and public-health progress.

The land sales, along with other similar Jewish land purchase in Palestine such as the Sursock Purchases, have been used to defame the families of those who sold the land. The son and two grandsons of Salim Ali Salam, Saeb Salam, Tammam Salam and Nawaf Salam, have served as Prime Minister of Lebanon, and have been criticized for their family's part in the Hula Concession purchase. Both Selim Ali Salam and Saeb Salam described the affair in their memoirs, attempting to clear the record.

== See also ==
- Sursock Purchases

== Bibliography ==
- Abu Fakhr, Saqr (22 December 2025). "الآراء الكسولة في امتياز الحولة... الرواية الصحيحة لبيع أراضي السهل" [Opinions on the Hula concession: The correct account of the sale of the plain's lands] (in Arabic). The New Arab.
- Anton, Glenna (2008). "Blind Modernism and Zionist Waterscape: The Huleh Drainage Project" (PDF). Jerusalem Quarterly (35): 76–92.
- Tyler, Warwick P. N. (July 1991). "The Huleh Lands Issue in Mandatory Palestine, 1920–34". Middle Eastern Studies. 27 (3): 343–373.
- Tyler, Warwick P. N. (October 1994). "The Huleh Concession and Jewish Settlement of the Huleh Valley, 1934–48". Middle Eastern Studies. 30 (4): 826–859.

=== Further reading ===
- Salam, Saeb (26 August 2026), "قصة امتياز الحولة 1914–1934", مجلة الشراع (in Arabic)
- זלטנרייך, יאיר; Seltenreich, Yair (2007). "The sale of northern Eretz-Israel lands during the British Mandate period / מכירת אדמות אצבע הגליל בתקופת המנדט — הזווית הערבית במסמכי שלטונות המנדט הצרפתי בסוריה ובלבנון". Horizons in Geography / אופקים בגאוגרפיה (68/69). University of Haifa / אוניברסיטת חיפה: 35–55. ISSN 0334-3774. JSTOR 23716445.
