= Gesher Benot Ya'aqov =

Bridge in northern Israel

Gesher Benot Ya'aqov: גשר בנות יעקב; جسر بنات يعقوب
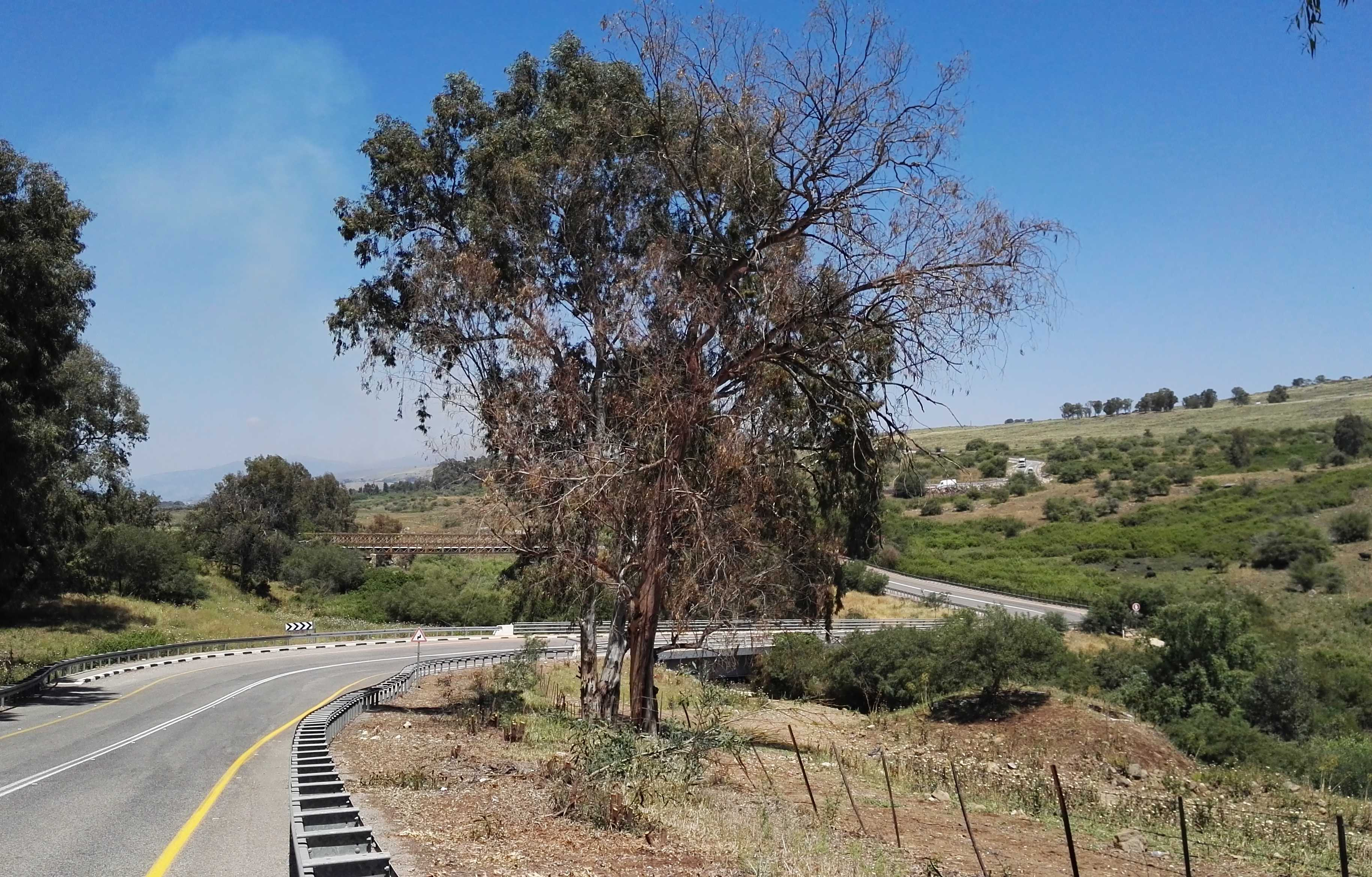
- The modern concrete bridge in 2016
- Coordinates: 33°0′37.02″N 35°37′41.83″E
- Crosses: Jordan River
- Locale: Northern District, Israel
- Named for: Jacob

History
- Opened: 2007

Location
- Location of the Gesher Benot Ya'aqov in northern Israel and the Golan Heights

The Gesher Benot Ya'aqov (Hebrew: גשר בנות יעקב, romanized: Gesher Bnot Ya'akov, Arabic: جسر بنات يعقوب, romanized: Jisr Benat Ya'kub) is a bridge in northern Israel.

The medieval Daughters of Jacob Bridge was dismantled and replaced in 1934 by a Warren truss bridge further south during the draining of Lake Hula; this was later replaced by a Bailey bridge.

The modern bridge was constructed in 2007 and forms part of Israeli Highway 91, just before the boundary between the Galilee and the Golan Heights.

The bridge is of strategic military significance as it is one of the few fixed crossing points over the upper Jordan River that enable access from the Golan Heights to the Upper Galilee.

== History ==
The bridge in 1942, showing the subject of this article, marked stone, and the historical Daughters of Jacob Bridge, marked demolished, from the Survey of Palestine

In 1934, in preparation for the draining of Lake Hula as part of a Zionist land reclamation project (see Hula Concession purchase), the medieval Daughters of Jacob Bridge was demolished replaced by a Warren truss bridge further south.

On the "Night of the Bridges" between 16 and 17 June 1946, the Warren truss bridge was destroyed by the Jewish Haganah. The Syrians captured the bridge on June 11, 1948, during the 1948 Palestine war, but later withdrew as a result of the 1949 Armistice Agreements between Israel and Syria. After the war, the bridge was in the central demilitarised zone established by the armistice agreement.

In 1953, the site was chosen as the original location for the water intake of the National Water Carrier of Israel, but after US pressure, the intake was moved downstream to the Sea of Galilee at Eshed Kinrot, which later became known as the Sapir Pumping Station at Tel Kinrot/Tell el-'Oreimeh.

During the Six-Day War, an Israeli paratrooper brigade captured the area, and after the war, the Israeli Combat Engineering Corps constructed a Bailey bridge. In the Yom Kippur War, Syrian forces approached the vicinity of the bridge. As a precaution, Israeli sappers placed explosives on the bridge but did not detonate them as the Syrians did not attempt to cross it.

=== 21st century ===
In 2007, one of the two Bailey bridges at the site (one for traffic from east to west and the other handling traffic in the opposite direction) was replaced with a modern concrete span, while the other Bailey bridge was left intact for emergency use.

== Gallery ==
Warren truss bridge in 1937, with remains of the historical Daughters of Jacob Bridge visible underneath

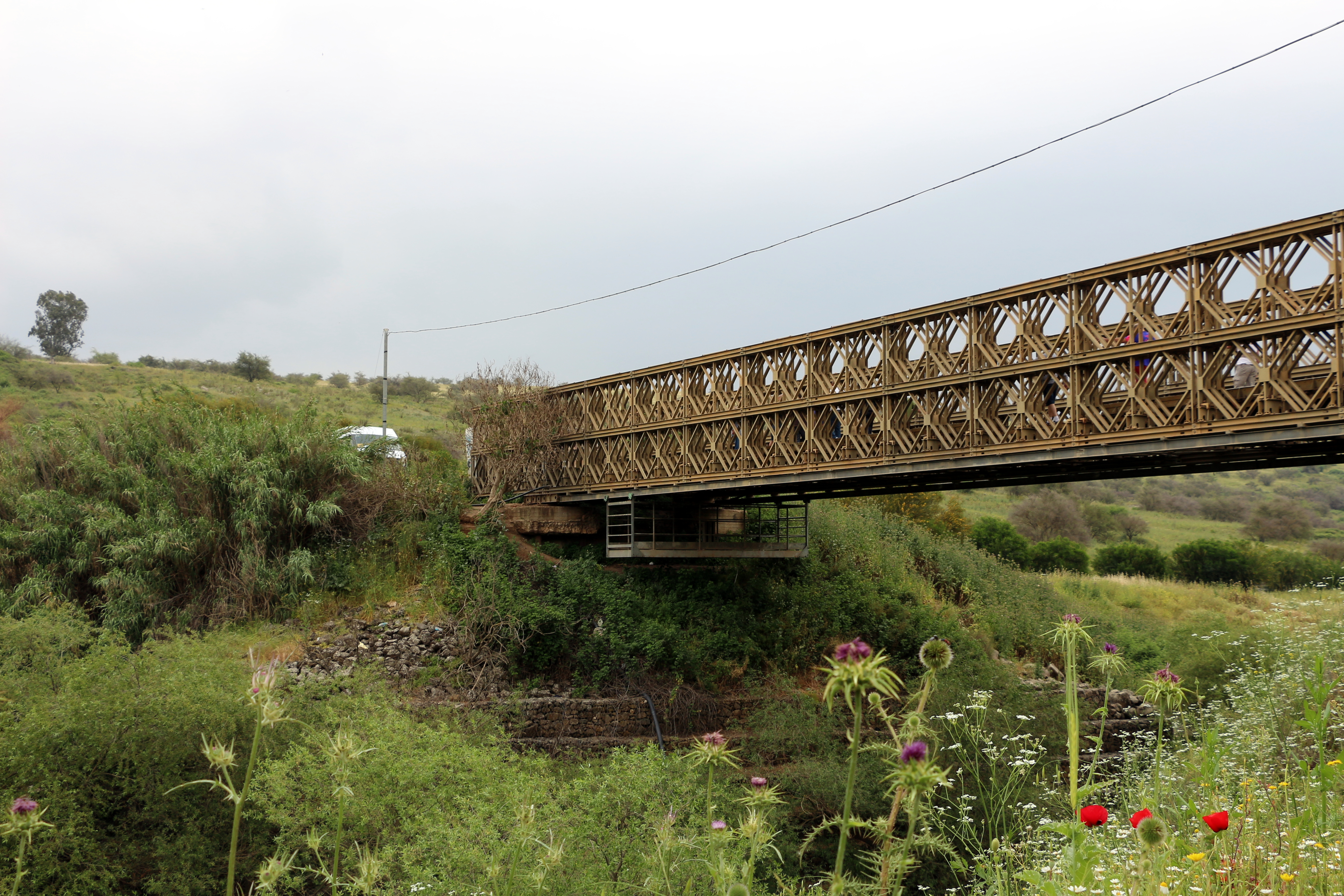
Remaining Bailey bridge in 2015

Remaining Bailey bridge in 2016
