= Daughters of Jacob Bridge =

Medieval bridge over the Jordan River

Daughters of Jacob Bridge: גשר בנות יעקב; جسر بنات يعقوب
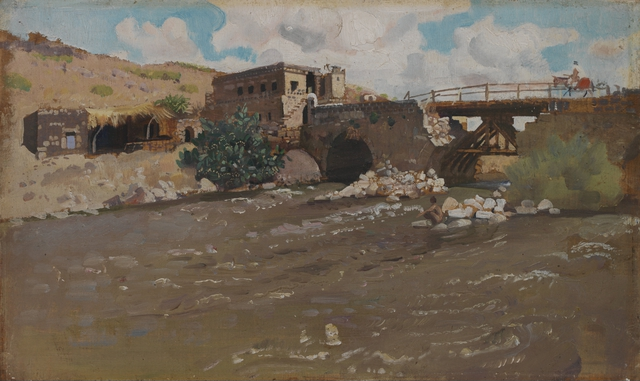
- The bridge and ancient khan in 1918
- Coordinates: 33°0′51.17″N 35°37′42.81″E
- Crosses: Jordan River
- Locale: Northern District, Israel
- Named for: Jacob

History
- Closed: 1932

Location
- Location of the Daughters of Jacob Bridge, approximately 400m north of the modern Gesher Benot Ya'aqov

The Daughters of Jacob Bridge (Hebrew: גשר בנות יעקב, romanized: Gesher Bnot Ya'akov, Arabic: جسر بنات يعقوب, romanized: Jisr Benat Ya'kub) was a medieval arch bridge that spanned the last natural ford of the Jordan River between the Korazim Plateau, today in northern Israel.

Within the vicinity of the bridge is the location of a well known Paleolithic archaeological site with Acheulean artifacts dated to around 780,000 years ago. The area has been used as a crossing point for thousands of years; it was part of the recently dubbed Via Maris, and was strategically important to the Ancient Egyptians, Assyrians, Hittites, Jews, Saracens (early Muslims), Crusaders, Ayyubids, Mamluks, Ottomans, and to modern inhabitants and armies who crossed the river at this place.

The site was named Jacob's Ford (Latin: Vadum Iacob) by Europeans during the Crusades. A stone bridge was built by the Mamluks sometime in the 13th century, who called it Jisr Ya'kub (lit. 'Jacob's Bridge'). Located southwest of the medieval bridge are the remains of a crusader castle known as Chastelet and east of the bridge are the remains of a Mamluk khan (caravanserai). The old arched stone bridge marked the northernmost limit of Napoleon's campaign in Syria, and was the site of the Battle of Jisr Benat Yakub during World War I.

Described by Professor Andrew Petersen as the "best-known medieval bridge in Palestine", the historical bridge was demolished in 1934 during the draining of Lake Hula (see Hula Concession purchase).

It was replaced by a series of modern bridges in a different location, approximately 400m south of the historic location. The modern history of these replacement bridges is described at Gesher Benot Ya'aqov – initially a Warren truss bridge, later replaced with two Bailey bridges, and finally a modern road bridge was built in 2007.

== Etymology ==
The Crusader-era nunnery of Saint James (Saint Jacques in French), from the nearby castellany of Sephet (modern-day Safed), received part of the customs paid at the ford, and since Jacques is derived from Jacob, this led to the name Jacob's Ford.

The references to "daughters" is relatively modern, attested no earlier that the 17th or 18th centuries.

The "daughters of Jacob" name was shared by a nearby reservoir (bath) and tomb (maqam). According to the PEF Survey of Palestine, the "legends of the bridge, the baths, and the tomb of Jacob’s daughters seem to be entirely of Mussulman origin".

== History and archaeology of the ford site ==
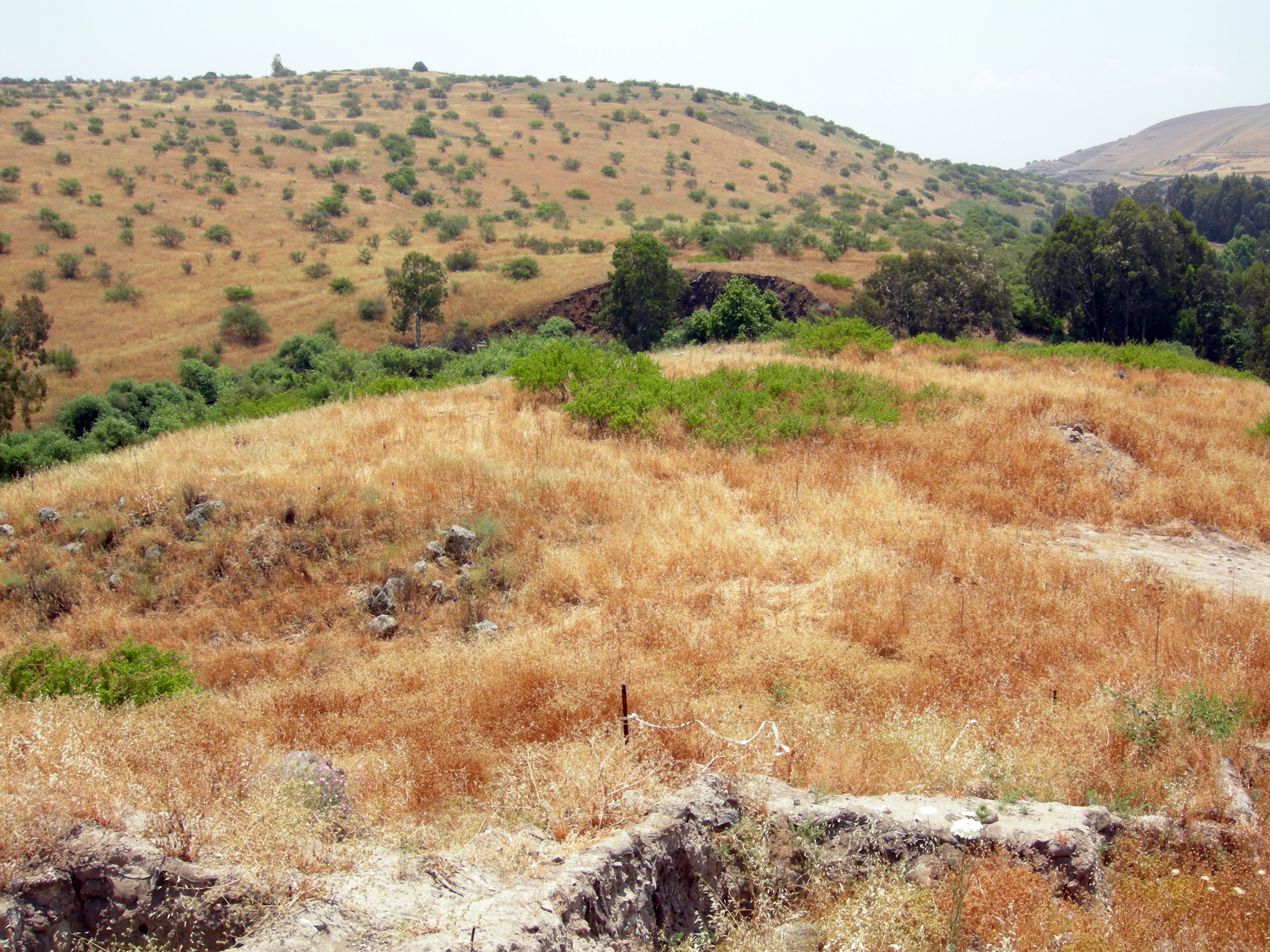
Jacob's Ford battlefield, looking from the west bank to the east bank of the Jordan River

=== Prehistory ===
Archaeological excavations at the prehistoric Gesher Benot Ya'aqov site have revealed evidence of human habitation in the area, from as early as 750,000 years ago. Archaeologists from the Hebrew University of Jerusalem claim that the site provides evidence of "advanced human behavior" half a million years earlier than has previously been estimated as possible. Their report describes a layer at the site belonging to the Acheulian (a culture dating to the Lower Palaeolithic, at the very beginning of the Stone Age), where numerous stone tools, animal bones and plant remains have been found, including those of the large elephant Palaeoloxodon recki which is associated with stone tools, including a handaxe, and shows cut and fracture marks indicating that it was butchered by archaic humans. According to the archaeologists Paul Pettitt and Mark White, the site has produced the earliest widely accepted evidence for the use of fire, dated approximately 790,000 years ago. A Tel-Aviv University study found remains of a huge carp fish cooked with the use of fire at the site 780,000 years ago. A 2026 study argued that the plant remains at the site include the oldest known evidence of medicinal plant use by humans, predating previous estimates by more than 700,000 years.

=== Crusader and Ayyubid period ===
Jacob's Ford was a key river crossing point and major trade route between Acre and Damascus. It was utilized by Christian Palestine and Seljuk Syria as a major intersection between the two civilizations, making it strategically important. When Humphrey II of Toron was besieged in the city of Banyas in 1157, King Baldwin III of Jerusalem was able to break the siege, only to be ambushed at Jacob's Ford in June of that year.

Later in the twelfth century, Baldwin IV of Jerusalem and Saladin continually contested the area around Jacob's Ford. Baldwin allowed the Templars to build Chastelet castle overlooking Jacob's Ford known to the Arabs as Qasr al-'Ata commanding the road from Quneitra to Tiberias. On 23 August 1179, Saladin successfully conducted the siege of Jacob's Ford, destroying the unfinished fortification, known as the castle of Vadum Iacob or Chastellet.

=== Mamluk and Ottoman bridge ===
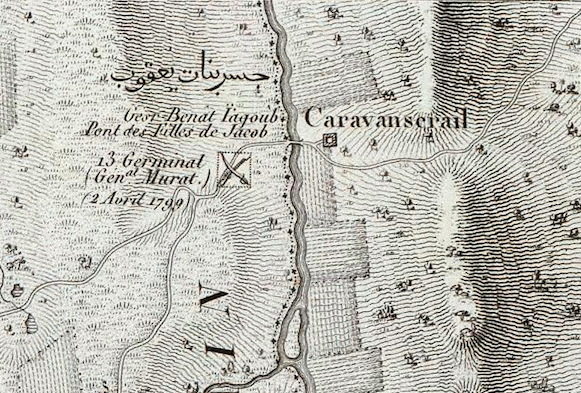
Jisr Benat Yacob marked on the Jacotin 1799 map

In the late Mamluk period, Sefad became a principal town and Baibars' postal road from Cairo to Damascus was extended with a branch that went through the north of Palestine. To accomplish this, the bridge was built over the Crusaders' Vadum Jacob (Jacob's ford). The bridge had the Mamluk characteristic dual-slope pathway like the Yibna Bridge. Al-Dimashqi (1256–1327) noted that "the Jordan traverses the district of Al Khaitah and comes to the Jisr Ya'kub (lit. "Jacob's Bridge"), under Kasr Ya'kub (lit. "Jacob's Castle"), and reaching the Sea of Tiberias, falls into it."

Before 1444, a merchant constructed a khan (caravanserai) on the eastern side of the bridge, one of a series of such khans built at the time. Edward Robinson noted that during the 14th century, travellers crossed the river Jordan below the Lake of Tiberias, while the first crossing in the area of Jisr Benat Yakob was noted in 1450 CE. The khan, at the eastern end of the bridge, and the bridge itself, were both probably built before 1450, according to Robinson.

For the year 1555−1556 CE (AH 963) the toll post at the bridge collected 25,000 akçe, and in 1577 (985 H) a firman commanded that the place had post horses ready.

On June 4, 1771, a combined force of Daher al-Umar's men and mamluk commander Abu al-Dhahab met the Damascene Pasha in battle, The result was a victory for the Zayadina coalition and established control of Irbid and Quneitra to Daher al Umar. This also set in motion the later Final Invasion of Damascus Eyalet & Siege of Damascus by Abu al-Dhahab

The bridge was maintained through the Ottoman period, with a caravanserai on one end of the bridge, as shown in the 1799 Jacotin map. During the Egyptian campaign of 1799, Napoleon sent his cavalry commander, general Murat, to defend the bridge, as a measure of preempting reinforcement from Damascus being sent to Akko during the siege laid by the French. Murat occupied nearby Safed and Tiberias, as well as the bridge and, by relying on the superior quality of French troops, managed to defeat Turkish units far outnumbering him. Jacotin's map marks the west side of the bridge with the name of General Murat and the date of 2 April 1799.

In 1881, the PEF's Survey of Western Palestine (SWP) also noted about Jisr Benat Yakub: "The bridge itself appears to be of later date than the Crusader period."

=== 20th century ===
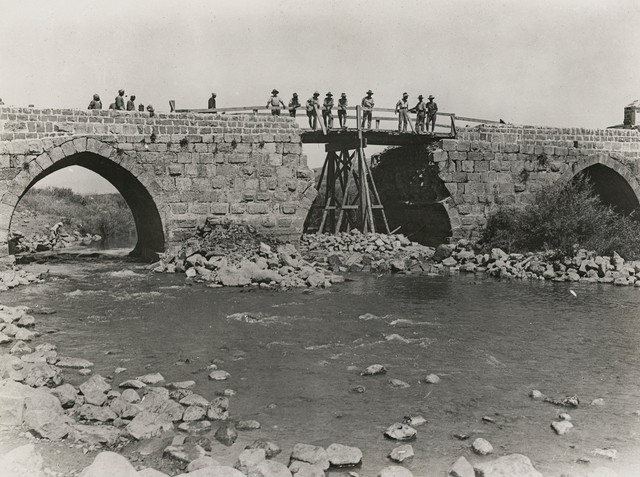
The Daughters of Jacob Bridge in 1918

Daughters of Jacob Bridges in 1942, showing the subject of this article, marked as demolished, and the modern bridge, marked stone, from the Survey of Palestine

The Battle of Jisr Benat Yakub was fought there on 27 September 1918 during the Sinai and Palestine Campaign of World War I, at the beginning of the pursuit by the British Army of the retreating remnants of the Ottoman Yildirim Army Group towards Damascus, who destroyed the central arch of the bridge. The bridge was shortly repaired by ANZAC sappers, flattening the original dual-slope pathway, making it useful for modern vehicles.

In 1934, during the early stages of the draining of Lake Hula, shortly ahead of the Hula Concession purchase, the old bridge was demolished and replaced by a modern one further south.

The modern history of the replacement bridges, 400m south, is described at Gesher Benot Ya'aqov.

British Mandate government history of the replacement of the bridge, late 1940s

Mohammad Salam confirms the old bridge is taken over for demolition, 15 Feb 1934

British government hand over the old bridge for demolition to the Hula Concessionaires, 5 Feb 1934

British government decide to require the Hula Concessionaires to build a new bridge, 19 Sept 1930

Correspondence of Cecil Quixano Henriques, of the Zionist Executive, with the British Mandate government, 3 April 1926

Correspondence of Cecil Quixano Henriques, of the Zionist Executive, with the British Mandate government, 1 Feb 1926

British memo noting that the Hula Concession allows for reconstruction of the bridge further down the river, 23 July 1930

== See also ==
- Archaeology of Israel and Levantine archaeology
- Barid, Muslim postal network renewed during Mamluk period (roads, bridges, khans)
  - Jisr al-Ghajar, stone bridge south of Ghajar
  - Al-Sinnabra Crusader bridge, with nearby Jisr Umm el-Qanatir/Jisr Semakh and Jisr es-Sidd further downstream
  - Jisr al-Majami bridge over the Jordan, with Mamluk khan
  - Jisr Jindas bridge over the Ayalon near Lydda and Ramla
  - Yibna Bridge or "Nahr Rubin Bridge"
  - Isdud Bridge (Mamluk, 13th century) outside Ashdod/Isdud
  - Jisr ed-Damiye, bridges over the Jordan (Roman, Mamluk, modern)
- Bir Ma'in, Arab village near Ramle, connected by a foundation legend to Jacob/Ya'kub and Daughters of Jacob Bridge/Jisr Benat Ya'kub.
- Jacob's Well, site associated with biblical Jacob in Samaritan and Christian tradition
- Jubb Yussef (Joseph's Well), site associated with biblical Joseph in Muslim tradition

== Bibliography ==
- Clermont-Ganneau, C.S. (1896). [ARP] Archaeological Researches in Palestine 1873–1874, translated from the French by J. McFarlane. Vol. 2. London: Palestine Exploration Fund. p. 78.
- Conder, C.R.; Kitchener, H.H. (1881). The Survey of Western Palestine: Memoirs of the Topography, Orography, Hydrography, and Archaeology. Vol. 1. London: Committee of the Palestine Exploration Fund.
- Cytryn, Katia; Czitron, Dror (2024). "Who Built Jisr (Banāt) Yaʿqūb over the Upper Jordan?". Mamluk Studies Review. XXVII. Middle East Documentation Center at the University of Chicago. doi:10.6082/RVBBQ-4H345. ISSN 1947-2404.
- El-Eini, Roza (2004). Mandated Landscape: British Imperial Rule in Palestine 1929–1948. Routledge. ISBN 978-1-135-77240-6.
- Guérin, V. (1880). Description Géographique Historique et Archéologique de la Palestine (in French). Vol. 3: Galilee, pt. 1. Paris: L'Imprimerie Nationale. (pp. 341−344)
- Karmon, Y. (1960). "An Analysis of Jacotin's Map of Palestine" (PDF). Israel Exploration Journal. 10 (3, 4): 155–173, 244–253. Archived from the original (PDF) on 2019-12-22.
- Le Strange, G. (1890). Palestine Under the Moslems: A Description of Syria and the Holy Land from A.D. 650 to 1500. London: Committee of the Palestine Exploration Fund.
- Murray, Alan V. editor. (2006), The Crusades: An Encyclopaedia, ISBN 1-57607-862-0
- Palmer, E.H. (1881). The Survey of Western Palestine: Arabic and English Name Lists Collected During the Survey by Lieutenants Conder and Kitchener, R.E. Transliterated and Explained by E.H. Palmer. Committee of the Palestine Exploration Fund. p. 76.
- Payne, R. (1998). The Crusades: A History. Wordsworth Editions. ISBN 1-85326-689-2.
- Petersen, Andrew (2001). A Gazetteer of Buildings in Muslim Palestine: 64. Jisr Banat Yacqub. Vol. I. Oxford University Press. pp. 182–183. ISBN 978-0-19-727011-0.
- Petersen, Andrew (2010). Medieval bridges of Palestine. Leuven−Paris−Walpole, MA: Uitgeverij Peeters.
- Pettitt, P.; White, Mark (2012). The British Palaeolithic: Human Societies at the Edge of the Pleistocene World. Abingdon, UK: Routledge. ISBN 978-0-415-67455-3.
- Pococke, R. (1745). A description of the East, and some other countries. Vol. 2. London: Printed for the author, by W. Bowyer. p. 73.
- Preston, R.M.P. (1921). The Desert Mounted Corps: An Account of the Cavalry Operations in Palestine and Syria 1917–1918. London: Constable & Co. OCLC 3900439.
- Pringle, D. (1997). Secular buildings in the Crusader Kingdom of Jerusalem: an archaeological Gazetter. Cambridge University Press. p. 85. ISBN 0521-46010-7.
- Richard, J. (1999). The Crusades c. 1071–c. 1291. Cambridge University press. ISBN 0-521-62566-1.
- Robinson, E.; Smith, E. (1841). Biblical Researches in Palestine, Mount Sinai and Arabia Petraea: A Journal of Travels in the year 1838. Vol. 3. Boston: Crocker & Brewster.
- Sharon, M. (1999). Corpus Inscriptionum Arabicarum Palaestinae, B-C. Vol. 2. Brill. ISBN 90-04-11083-6.
- Sosland, Jeffrey (2007). Cooperating Rivals: The Riparian Politics of the Jordan River Basin. SUNY Press. ISBN 978-0-7914-7201-9.
- Sufian, Sandra M. (2008). Healing the Land and the Nation: Malaria and the Zionist Project in Palestine, 1920–1947. University of Chicago Press. ISBN 978-0-226-77938-6.
