= Haifa Bay =

Bay along the Mediterranean coast of Northern Israel

Coordinates: 32°49′23.01″N 35°1′26.04″E

Satellite image of Haifa Bay, November 2026

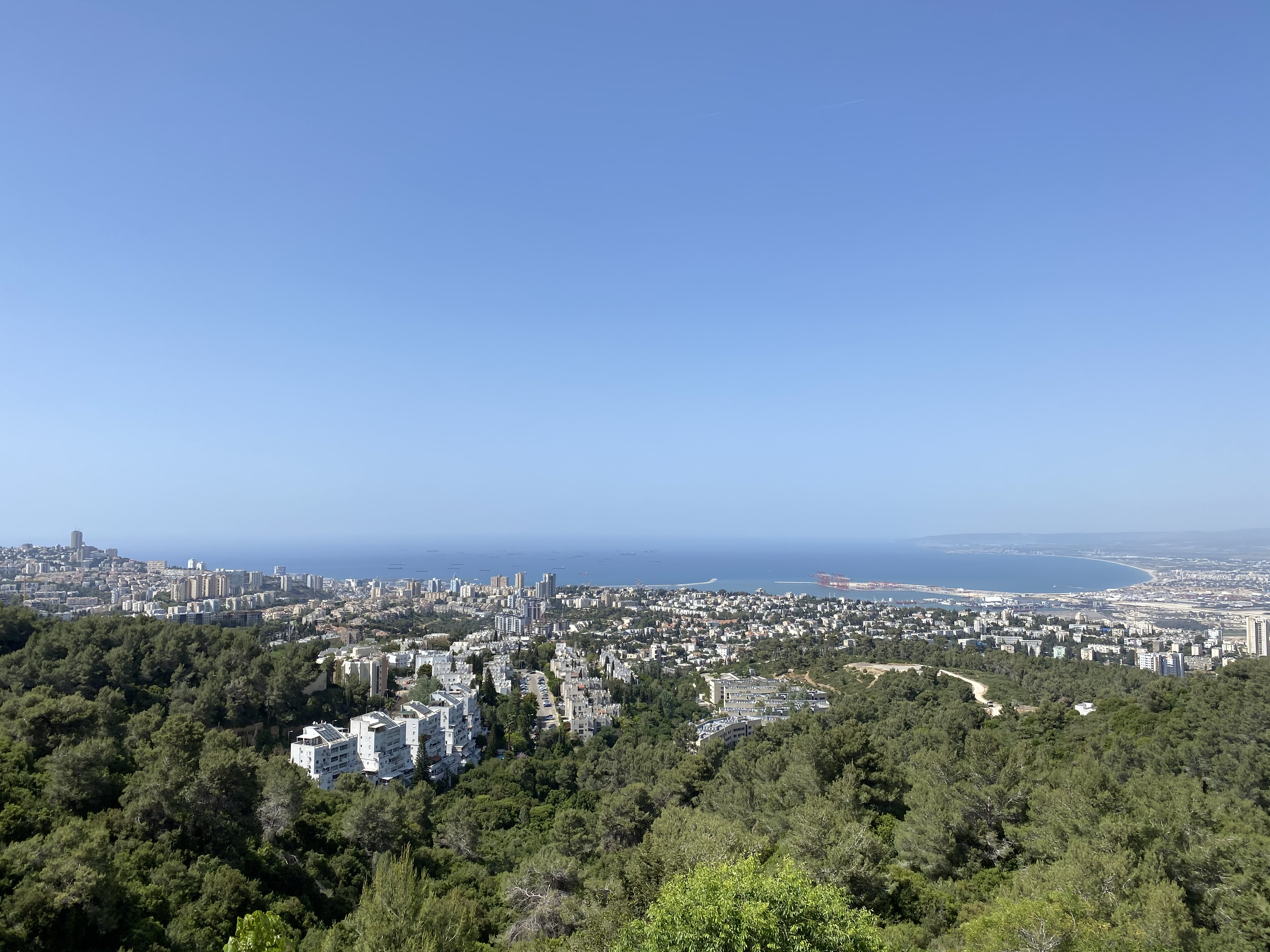
Haifa Bay as viewed from Denia.

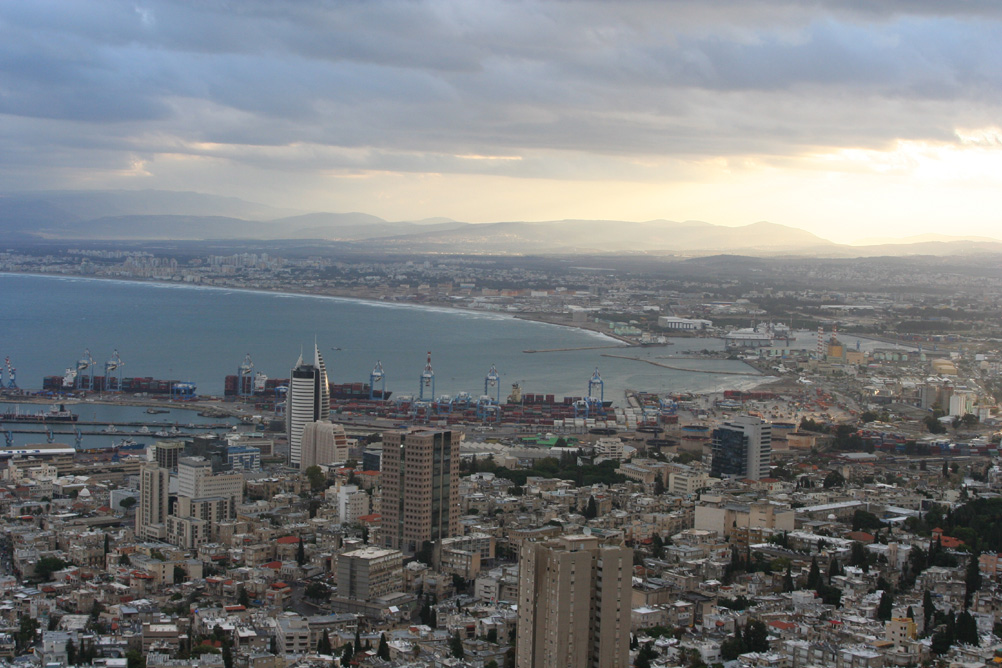
Haifa Bay.

A map of the Galilee showing Haifa Bay

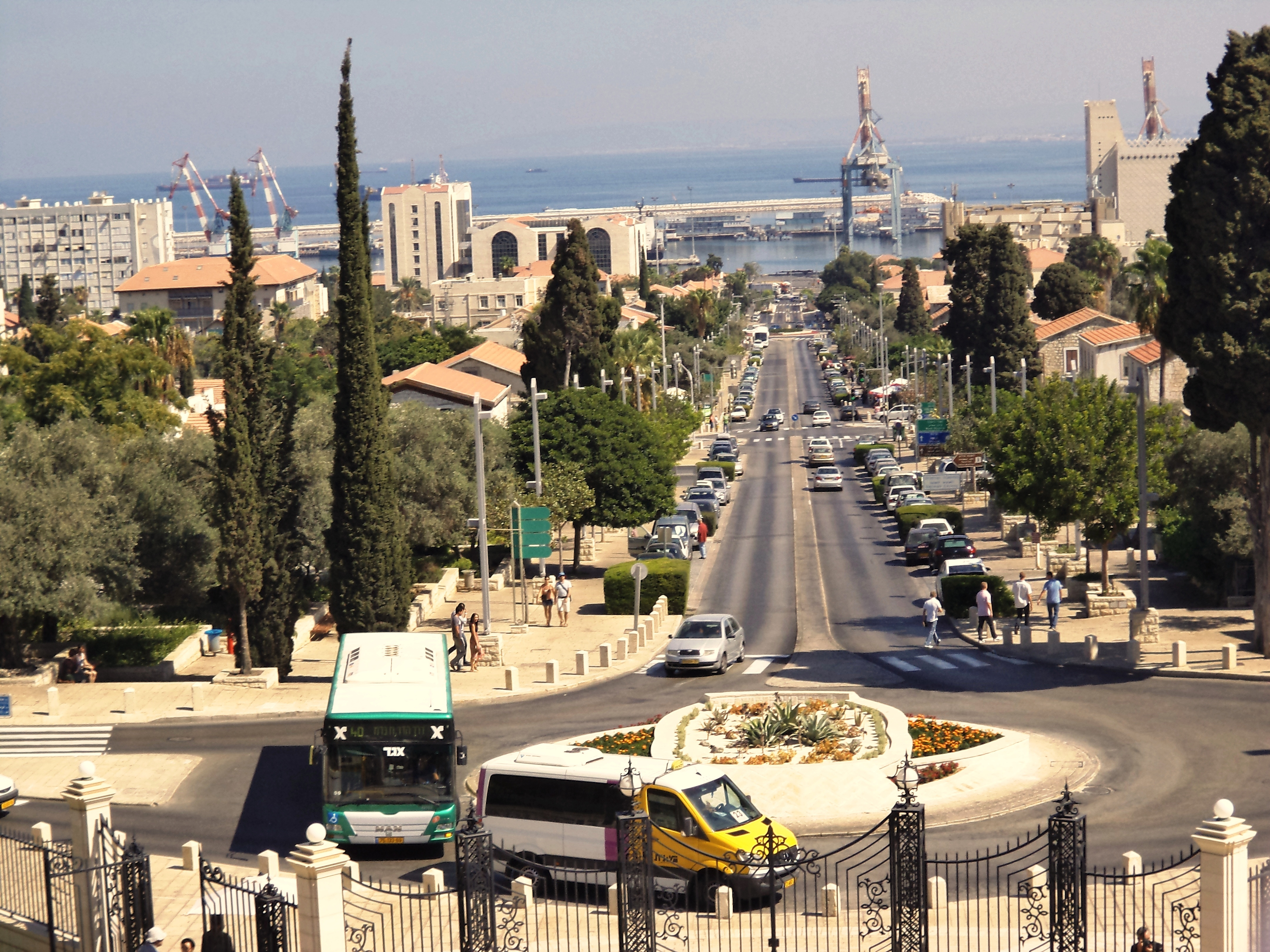
Haifa: German Colony and harbour

The Bay of Haifa or Haifa Bay (Hebrew: מפרץ חיפה, Mifratz Heifa), formerly Bay of Acre, is a bay along the Mediterranean coast of Northern Israel. Haifa Bay is Israel's only natural harbor on the Mediterranean.

Haifa Bay also refers one of Haifa's nine quarters, covering the overwhelmingly industrial area northeast of Downtown and south of Kiryat Hayim.

== Geography ==
Fed by the Kishon River, the cities of Haifa and Acre mark its southern and northern capes, while its centre is lined with dunes and the suburban Krayot neighbourhoods. Mount Carmel rises from the southern edge, while the mountains of the Western Galilee run up to the shore at the northern boundary. The Zvulun Valley, a coastal plain, runs 14 km along the coast of the bay between these mountainous boundaries.

According to paleogeographic studies, 3,000 to 3,500 years ago Haifa Bay was larger and extended as far as the area of present-day Kibbutz Yagur. The estuary of Kishon River was wider, and as a result of sand deposition from the sea and sediment carried by the river, the estuary became covered, causing the coastline to shift to its current location.

The Port of Haifa lies along part of its southeastern coastline.

== History ==
In the 1920s, several kibbutzim were established in the Bat Galim neighborhood on Haifa Bay in the wake of British Mandatory budgeting for development of the area. With the coast of Palestine lacking a modern harbor, the British authorities drew up plans for new port facilities. The Haifa Bay Development Company, founded in February 1925 to further these plans, could not recruit the necessary capital, so the transaction was made by the Palestine Land Development Company.

The area was acquired by the Jewish community as part of the Sursock Purchase. The land was purchased from the Sursock family, which had bought it from the Ottoman government in 1872. The 45,000 dunam tract was known as the Jidro lands. The company also acquired a 99-year concession for an additional 12,000 dunams of adjoining land, bringing the total area to 57,000. The land changed hands several times due to financial difficulties, eventually becoming the property of the Bayside Land Company, established in cooperation with the Jewish National Fund. In 1928, the company commissioned Patrick Abercrombie to draw up a development plan.

In 1934, the Phoenicia glass factory was established in Haifa Bay. The company moved to Yeruham in 1968, and is still operating today.

== Ports and industrial zone ==
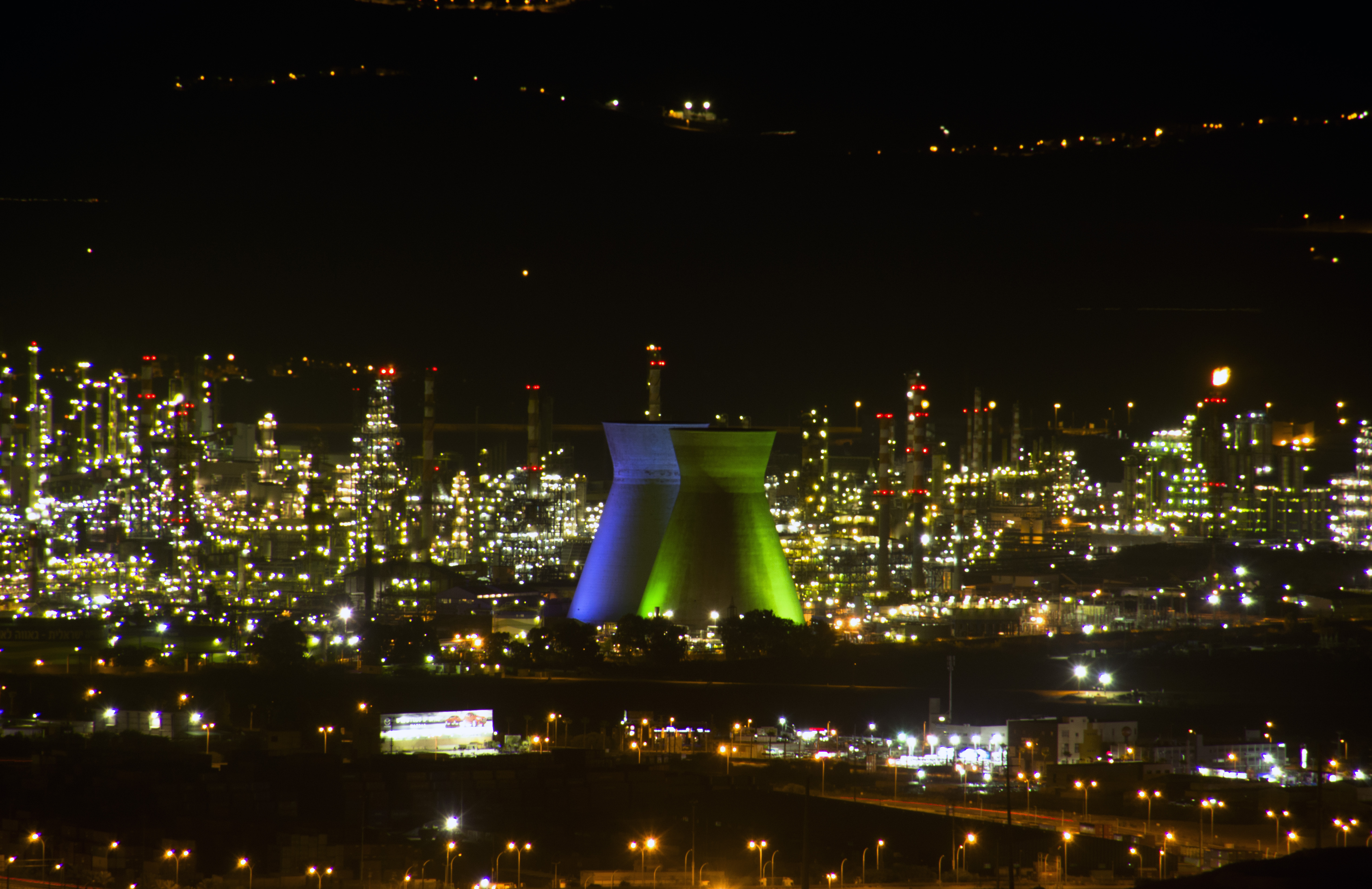
The cooling towers of the Haifa oil refinery are a nationally recognized symbol of Haifa as a center of industry.

The Port of Haifa and a private port operated by Israel Shipyards are located in Haifa Bay. In 2017 they handled a combined total of 32 million tons of cargo, making the port complex one of the largest in the Eastern Mediterranean.

The Bay region is also home to an extensive industrial zone containing various factories, workshops, large shore-based oil refineries, chemical, metals fabrication and power plants and other industrial and storage facilities. The 76-meter high twin cooling towers of the Haifa oil refinery are a nationally recognized icon for the city. For this reason, they have been left intact, though they are no longer actually used since technological advancements in refining have made them obsolete.

== Environmental concerns ==
Historically the concentration of industry in the area has also led to pollution of the air and the bay, and a higher incidence of cancer in the surrounding communities. In response, since the late 2000s the Israeli Environment Protection ministry, in conjunction with area industries, has implemented a comprehensive pollution reduction, monitoring and reporting programme for the region. This effort, together with the practice by major plants in the region of switching from using heavy fuels to natural gas as their primary fuel source, starting in 2013, has led to a significant reduction in air pollution. The ministry estimates that between 2009 and 2014 overall air pollution in the Bay area has been reduced by 70%, although the overall concentration of heavy industry in the area means that air pollution is still higher as compared with other regions in Israel.
