= Saqr Abu Fakhr =

Arab journalist based in Lebanon

Saqr Abu Fakhr (Arabic: صقر أبو فخر) is a Palestinian writer living in Lebanon. He is a researcher and author specialized in Arab Affairs, with special focus on Palestinian affairs.

Abu Fakhr began writing in 1973 and his works have been published in newspapers and journals such as As-Safir, Arab Studies, and Shu'un Filastiniyya. He is a researcher and editor at the Arab Center for Research and Policy Studies office in Beirut.

== Career ==
Abu Fakhr has held a variety of editorial and research positions. He was appointed as the Editorial Secretary for the "Palestine Supplement" in Assafir, a leading Arabic daily newspaper. Since 1981, he was the editor/assistant managing editor for a number of journals and research institutes, namely the PLO Planning Center and the Institute for Palestine Studies. He was also the editor for Majallat Al-Dirasat Al-Filastiniyya (مجلة الدراسات الفلسطينية), the Arabic-language journal of the Institute for Palestine Studies (مؤسسة الدراسات الفلسطينية).

== Writing ==
Abu Fakhr has written extensively about Palestinian history, culture, and the situation of refugees in Lebanon. His writings have been translated into various languages (such as Turkish, Kurdish, Persian, French and English). He is a member of several professional associations, such as the General Union of Palestinian Writers and Journalists, the Information Committee in the International Council for the Palestinians in the Diaspora - Geneva) and other advocacy societies (such the Arab National Congress and the Right of return). Abu Fakhr also became the editor of a collection of unpublished short stories by the Palestinian writer Samira Azzam upon discovering them and making them available to the public.

Abu Fakhr is the author of the article "Seven Prejudices about the Jews" published in Al-Hayat (12-14 November 1997); it examined and refuted seven common subjects of Arab myths about Israel and the Jews:

- That Judaism is not a monotheistic religion.
- That the blood libel such as in the book The Matzoh of Zion are true.
- That the Israeli flag represents the goal of the borders of Israel to be from the Nile to the Euphrates ("Greater Israel")
- That the Protocols of the Elders of Zion is true.
- The Zionist Occupation Government conspiracy theory and that Jews wield hidden power
- That there is a unique Jewish ingenuity.
- That there is an all-powerful Zionist "Jewish lobby" in the United States.
