= Palestine Jewish Colonization Association =

1924–1957 Zionist organization

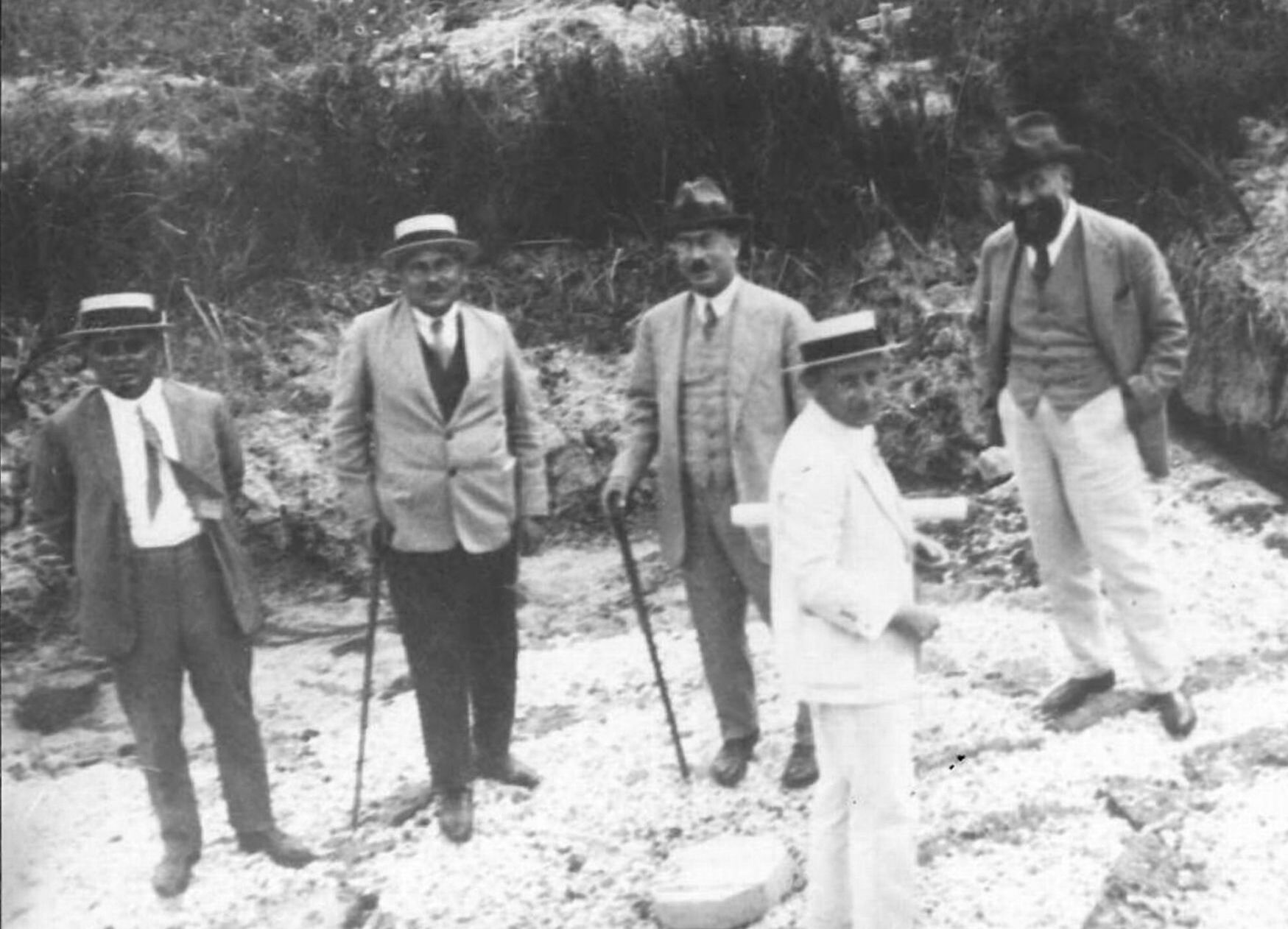
Members of PICA in Palestine, c.1920-1925

The Palestine Jewish Colonization Association (Hebrew: חברה להתיישבות יהודית בארץ־ישראל), commonly known by its Yiddish acronym PICA (Hebrew: פיק"א), was a Zionist organization established in 1924 to facilitate Jewish land purchase in Palestine and for establishing Jewish settlements in Palestine. (Note: Norman 1985: "In 1924 a new company, the Palestine Jewish Colonization Association (PICA), was registered. It took over from JCA the management of all the settlements that JCA had supervised, including not only colonies originally under Rothschild's care, such as Petach Tikvah and Rishon-le-Zion, but also places that JCA had taken under its wing in 1896 or subsequently, like Rehovoth and Ness Ziona, or had itself founded, like Hedera and Sedjera.") The PICA played a significant role in laying the foundations what would become the State of Israel. The association disbanded in 1957.

The Jewish Colonization Association (JCA or ICA) was founded by Bavarian philanthropist Baron Maurice de Hirsch in 1891 to help Jews from Russia and Romania to settle in Argentina. Baron de Hirsch died in 1896 and thereafter the JCA began to also assist the Jewish settlement in Palestine. At the end of 1899 Edmond James de Rothschild transferred title to his colonies in Palestine, plus fifteen million francs to the JCA. In 1924, the JCA branch dealing with colonies in Palestine was reorganized by Baron de Rothschild as the Palestine Jewish Colonization Association, with his son James de Rothschild appointed as president for life.

Between 1895 and 1899, Rothschild's development agency and PICA planted Palestine’s first major forest in Hadera, primarily aiming to drain swamps. The developers sourced 250,000 eucalyptus seeds from Algeria, where French settlers had cultivated large eucalyptus forests. In the 1920s, the once-dominant eucalyptus trees were replaced by pine trees, which were hardy, fast-growing, and contributed to a more European-like landscape. After the 1929 Palestine riots, PICA extended its support beyond forestation, helping to rehabilitate agricultural colonies that had been damaged in the unrest.

From 1927, the Palestine Jewish Colonization Association (PICA)—successor to the Jewish Colonization Association (JCA)—competed with the Greek Orthodox Patriarchate over lands at Caesarea. British Mandatory topo-cadastral maps indicate that JCA/PICA held the largely barren tracts north of the Caesarea–al-Shuna road, while the Church owned the more fertile, cultivated area to the south. Amid the upheavals of 1936–1939, the Patriarchate opened secret negotiations to dispose of its Caesarea holdings to PICA; surviving correspondence names intermediaries (including PICA solicitor Mr. Ferragi and Mr. Hamishwili) and records Patriarch Timotheos.

James de Rothschild, who died in 1957, instructed in his will that PICA should transfer most of its land in Israel to the Jewish National Fund. On December 31, 1958, PICA agreed to vest its right to land holdings in Syria and Lebanon in the State of Israel.

== See also ==
- Jewish Territorial Organization
- Zionism as settler colonialism
- Organization for Jewish Colonization in Russia
