= Israel Land Development Company =

Israeli conglomerate founded in 1909

- Type: Public
- Traded as: TASE: ILDC; Nasdaq: ILDC
- Founded: 1909; 117 years ago
- Headquarters: Tel Aviv, Israel
- Key people: Yaakov Nimrodi
- Website: ildc.co.il/en/

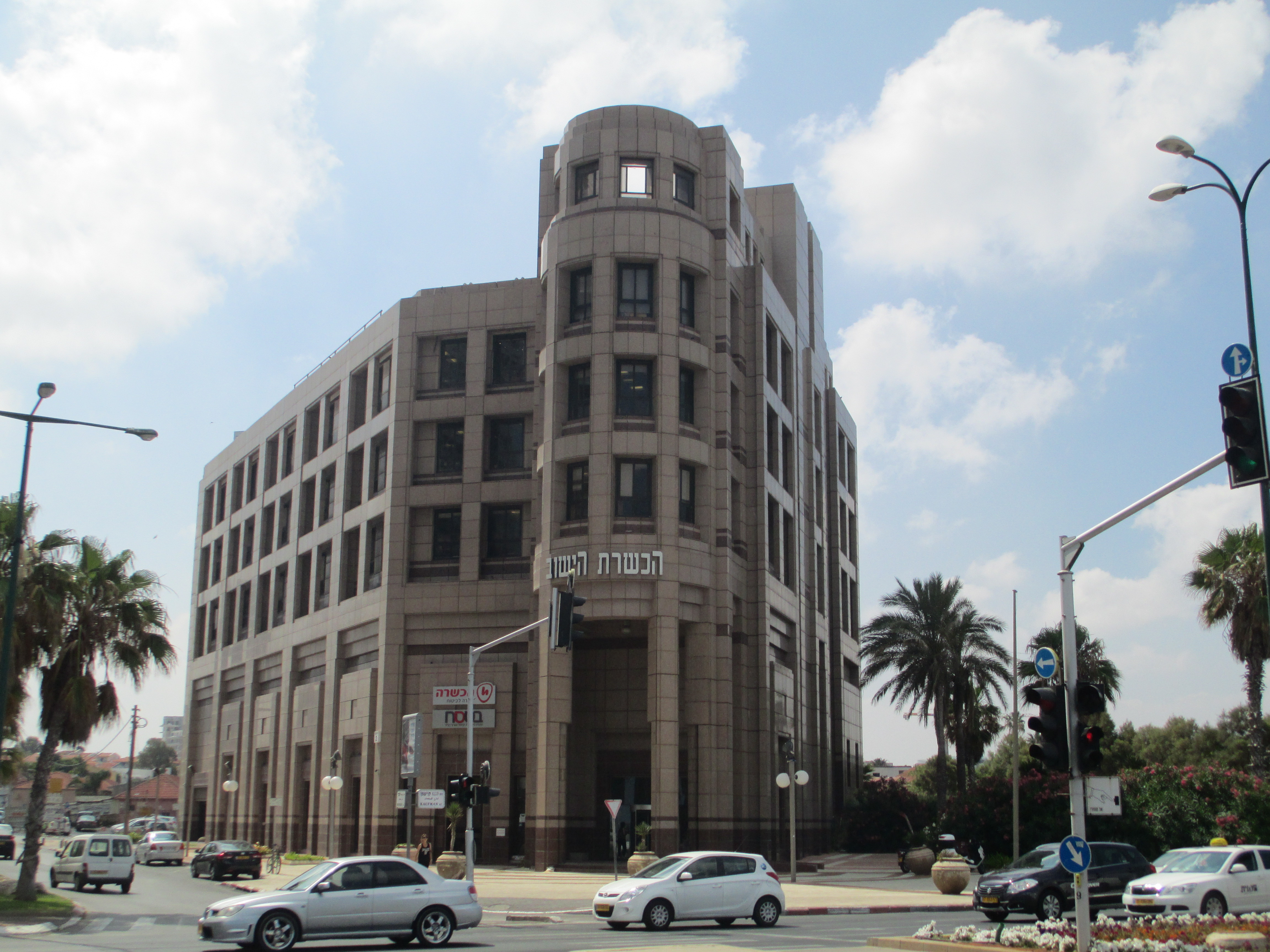
Head office in Tel Aviv

Israel Land Development Company (ILDC; Hebrew: הכשרת הישוב, Hakhsharat HaYishuv) is one of Israel's largest conglomerates, with fields including real estate, construction, energy and hotels. It was acquired in 1987 by Yaakov Nimrodi.

== History ==
ILDC was founded in 1909 by the Zionist Federation as the Palestine Land Development Company, or Palestine Land Development Corporation. It was a program of the practicalist movement in early Zionism, particularly in the decade before the start of World War I. The PLDC purchased land, trained Jews in agricultural pursuits, and established Jewish agricultural settlements in Palestine, such as the Hula Concession purchase. By the outbreak of World War I it had purchased about 50,000 dunam (about 4600 hectares) of land. It attempted to purchase nearly 3 times that amount in the Jezreel Valley, however the outbreak of the war prevented it from making such a purchase.

In July 1930, surveyor Nahum Paper, agronomist Yitzhak Elazari Volcani, and others conducted surveys in Ajlun district. After returning to Jerusalem, they concluded that Transjordan "has a great potential, but it presently lacks energy, capital and professional knowledge." Additionally, referring to the attitudes of local populations, Paper stated: "I have found indifference among the masses of fellahin; sympathy amid the senior officialdom and the minorities, such as the Circassians; but fierce hatred and deep apprehension among other officials, the urban intelligentsia and the merchants, most of whom come from Damascus and the rest from Nablus".

It became an Israeli public company in 1953.

Yaakov Nimrodi took control of the company in 1988 with a $26m investment. In 2006 Nimrodi signed an agreement to buy out a 20% minority shareholder which valued the company at $172m.

== Properties owned by ILDC ==
- Rimonim Hotels
