= Beit She'arim (Roman-era Jewish village) =

Roman-era ruin in Lower Galilee

- Sheikh Abreiḳ
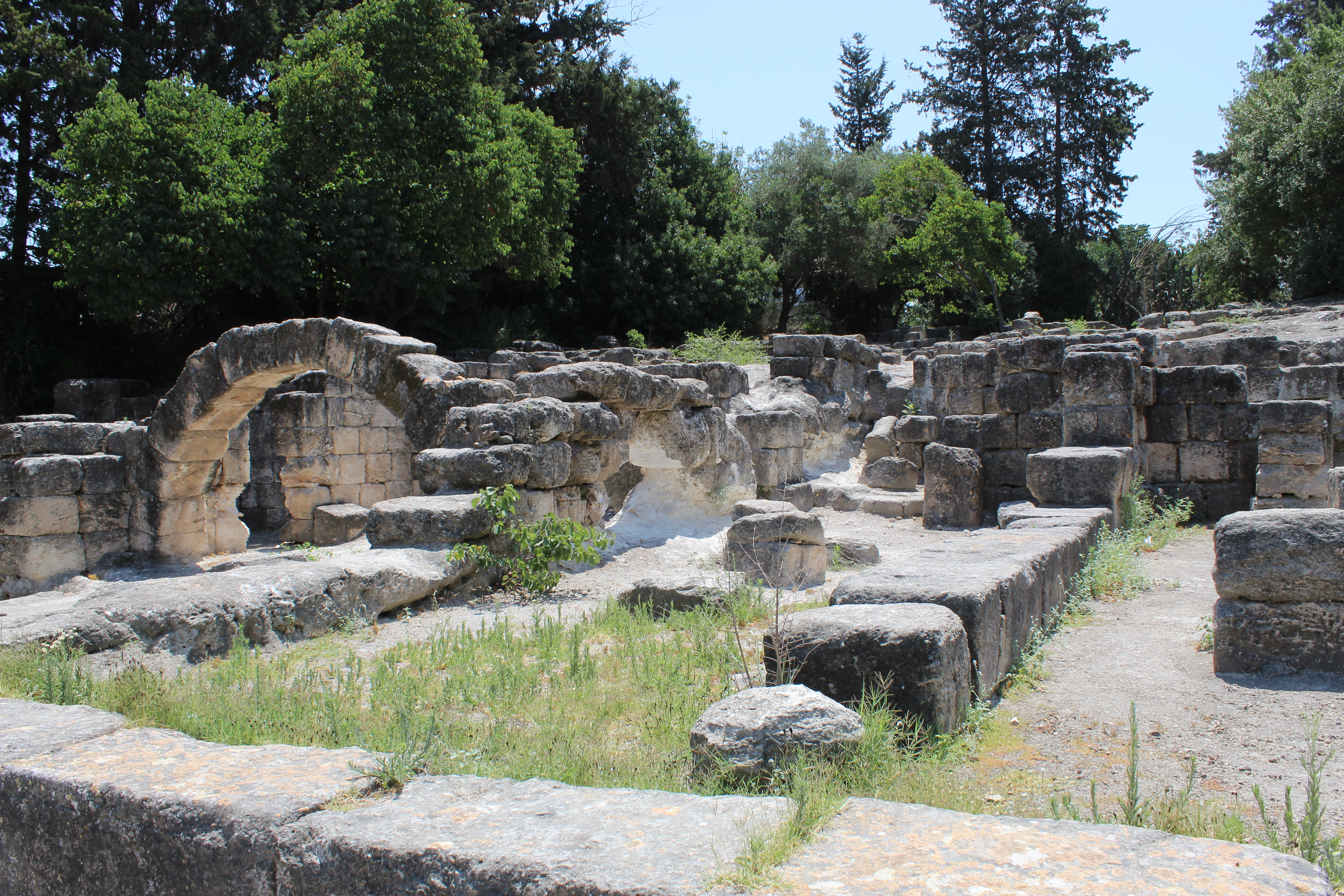
- Ancient ruin of Beit Shearim in Lower Galilee

- Location within Israel
- 32°42′08″N 35°07′45″E
- Periods: Hellenistic, Roman era, Byzantine era, Early Arab
- Cultures: Jewish, Graeco-Roman, Byzantine
- Location: Israel

History
- Built: Hellenistic period
- Abandoned: 20th century

Site notes
- Excavation dates: 1936–40, 1953–55
- Archaeologists: Benjamin Mazar, Nahman Avigad
- Condition: Ruin
- Public access: yes

Beit She'arim (Hebrew: בית שערים; Imperial Aramaic: בית שריי / Bet Sharei), also Besara (Greek: Βήσαρα), was a Jewish village located in the southwestern hills of the Lower Galilee, during the Roman period, from the 1st century BCE to the 3rd century CE. At one point, it served as the seat of the Sanhedrin, the Jewish Supreme Court.

Josephus mentions Beit She'arim in the late Second Temple period as a royal estate belonging to Berenice, near the border of Acre. In the mid-2nd century CE, it flourished as a town under the leadership of Rabbi Judah ha-Nasi, the compiler of the Mishnah, when it became a center of rabbinic scholarship and literary activity. After Rabbi Judah ha-Nasi's death around 220 CE, he was laid to rest in the adjoining necropolis. This necropolis, a vast network of underground tombs, transformed Beit She'arim into a central burial ground for Jews from both the Land of Israel and diaspora communities across the Middle East.

Beth She'arim underwent a crisis in the 4th century and a continued decline by the 5th century, transforming from an urban center back into a rural village. Byzantine-period remains from the 6th and 7th centuries indicate a very limited presence at the site. Later this was the site of Sheikh Bureik, a village depopulated in the early 1920s due to the Sursock Purchase.

It is today part of the Beit She'arim National Park.

== Location ==
The site is situated on the spur of a hill about half a kilometer long and 200 meters wide, and lies in the southern extremity of the Lower Galilee mountains, facing the western end of the Jezreel Valley, east of Daliat el-Carmel, south of Kiryat Tivon, and west of Ramat Yishai. It rises 138 metres (453 ft) above sea level at its highest point. It is first mentioned by Josephus as Besara where grain from the King's land was stored.

== Identification ==
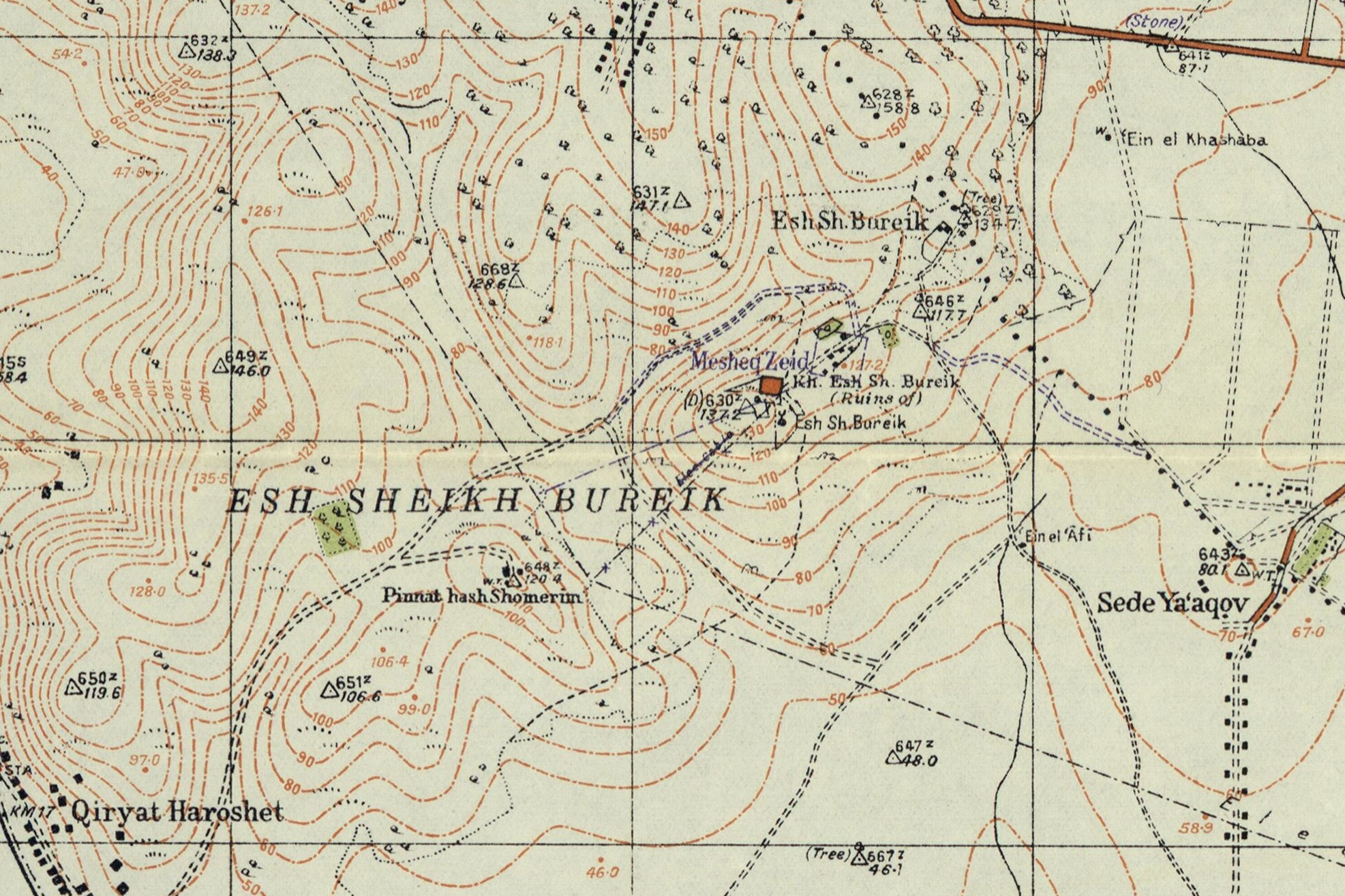
Sheikh Bureik, Lajjun in the Survey of Palestine in 1942

For many years the ancient site of Beit Shearim remained obscure and nearly slipped into oblivion. Some historical geographers thought that Sheikh Abreiḳ was to be identified with Gaba Hippeum (Geba), the site mentioned by Josephus as being in the confines of Mount Carmel.

Historical geographer Samuel Klein argued in 1913 that Beth-Shearim and Besara were to be recognised as one and the same place, an opinion agreed to earlier by C.R. Conder, but he was unable to pin-point its location. In 1936 Alexander Zaïd discovered what he thought was a "new" catacomb among the already known burial caves in the hill directly below Sheikh Abreiḳ, and brought the necropolis to the attention of archaeologist Benjamin Mazar and his brother-in-law Yitzhak Ben-Zvi; Ben-Zvi proposed that this was the burial grounds of the Jewish Patriarchal family of the 2nd-century CE. On this basis Klein proposed that Sheikh Abreik was the ancient site of Beit Shearim, which was corroborated by the discovery of a broken marble slab, from a mausoleum above Catacomb no. 11, containing a Greek inscription, in which the funerary epigram (written during the deceased person's lifetime) bears the words: "I, Justus, the son of [S]appho, of the family Leontius, have died and have been laid to rest...alas... ...esar......", where "...esar..." was interpreted to have been Besara.

Arguably the most definitive pieces of evidence that helped scholars identify Sheikh Bureik with Beit Shearim is the Talmudic reference that the body of Rabbi Judah the Prince, after he had died in Sepphoris, was carried for burial at Beit Shearim, during which funeral procession they made eighteen stops at different stations along the route to eulogize him. Josephus, when speaking about Besara in Vita § 24 (the Jewish-Galilean Aramaic dialect for Beit Shearim), places the village at "60 stadia (more than 11 km.) from Simonias," a distance corresponding with the site at Sheikh Bureik, where is situated the largest Jewish necropolis found in the Land of Israel, and only "20 stadia (3.7 km.) from Geba of the Horsemen," thought by Mazar to be Ḫirbet el-Ḥârithîye. This prompted historian Ben-Zvi to suggest that the necropolis at Sheikh Bureik (Shêkh 'Abrêq) and the tombs found there were none other than that of the Patriarchal Dynasty belonging to Judah the Prince.

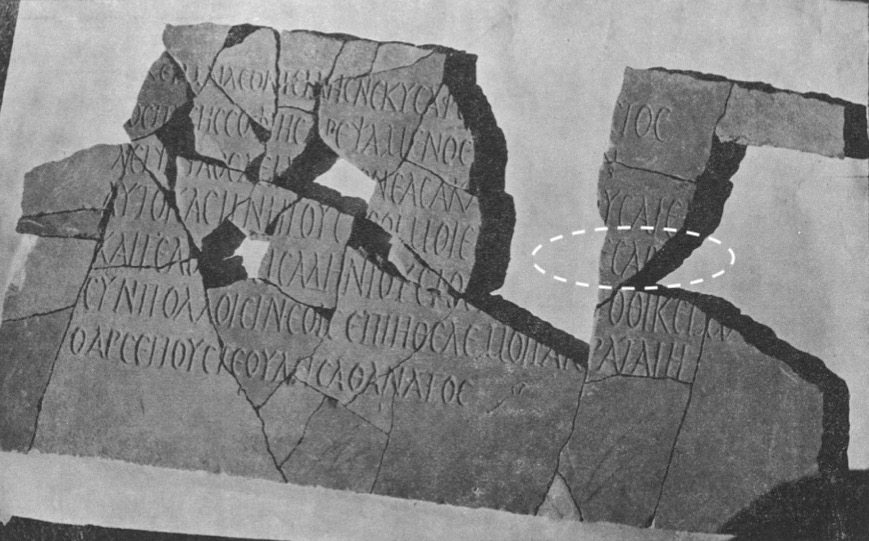

]ΚΕΙΜΑΙΛΕΟΝΤΕΙΔΗϹΝΕΚΥϹΑΦ[...]ϹΤΟϹ[
]ΟϹΠ[...]ΗϹϹΟΦΙΗϹ[...]ΡΕΨΑΜΕΝΟϹ[...]Ν[
]ΛΕΙΨ.ΦΑΟϹΔΕΙ[...]ΝΕΑϹΑΚΑ[...]ΥϹΑΙΕ[
]ΑΥΤΟΚΑϹΙΓΝΗΤΟΥϹΕΟΙΜΟΙΕ[...]ΕϹΑΡ[
]ΚΑΙΓΕΛΘ[...]ΕΙϹΑΔΗΝΙΟΥϹΤΟ[...]ΤΟΘΙΚΕΙΜ[
]ϹΥΝΠΟΛΛΟΙϹΙΝΕΟΙϹΕΠΙΗΘΕΛΕΜΟΙΡΑΚΡΑΤΑΙΗ[
]ΘΑΡϹΕΙΙΟΥϹΤΕΟΥΔΕΙϹΑΘΑΝΑΤΟϹ[

Justus the Leontide inscription at Sheikh Abreiq which includes the Greek letters "...ECAP..." (...esar...) interpreted to refer to Besara.

These facts prompted seven seasons of systematic excavations at Sheikh Abreiḳ and its necropolis between the years 1936–1940, and 1956, on behalf of the Jewish Palestine Exploration Society, and again in the years 1953–1958 under Nahman Avigad. Additional excavations were conducted at the site in 2006–2007 by archaeologist Yotam Tepper on behalf of the Israel Antiquities Authority, during which season coins from the Roman and Byzantine periods were retrieved.

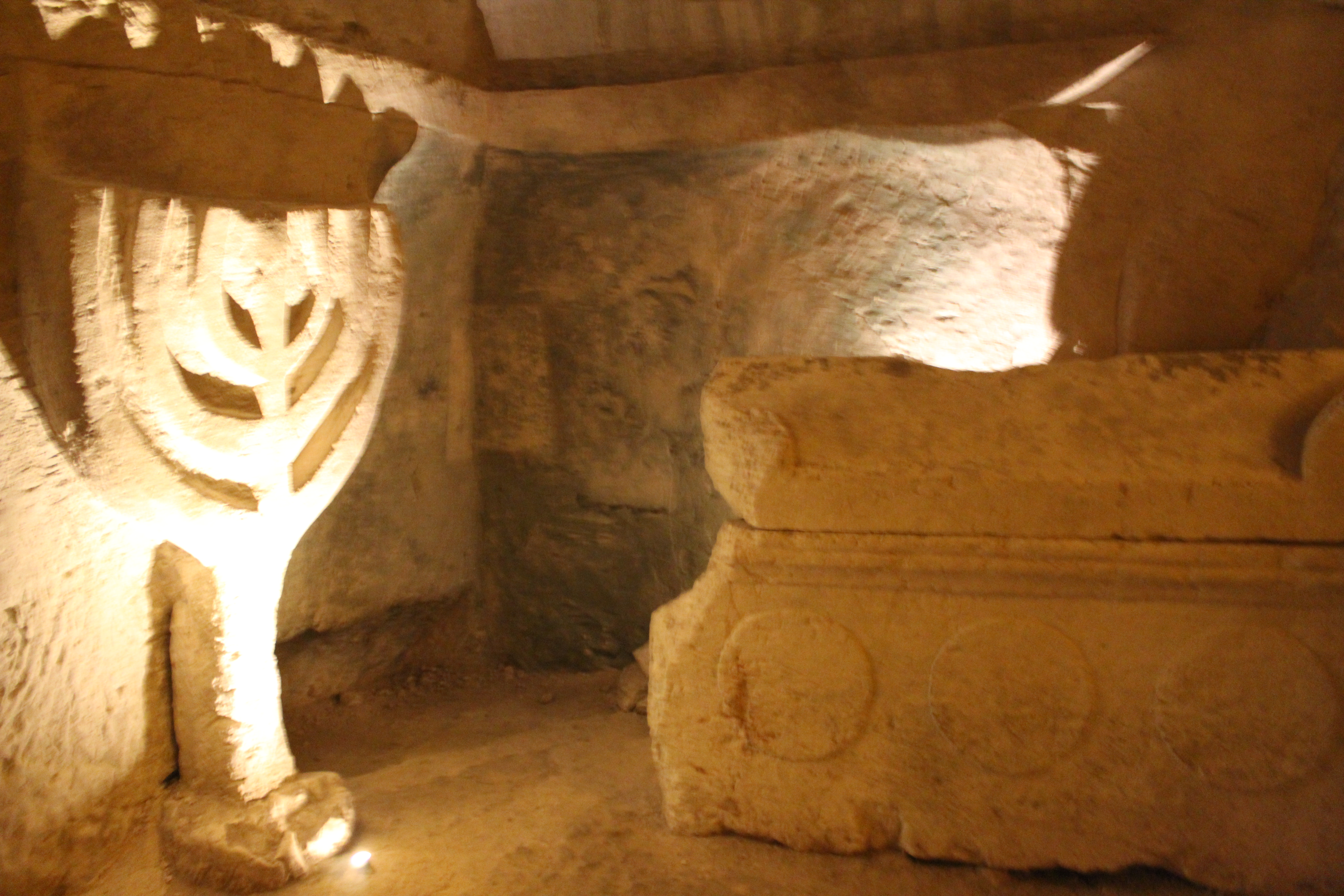
Menorah and Sargophagus found at the Beit Shearim necropolis

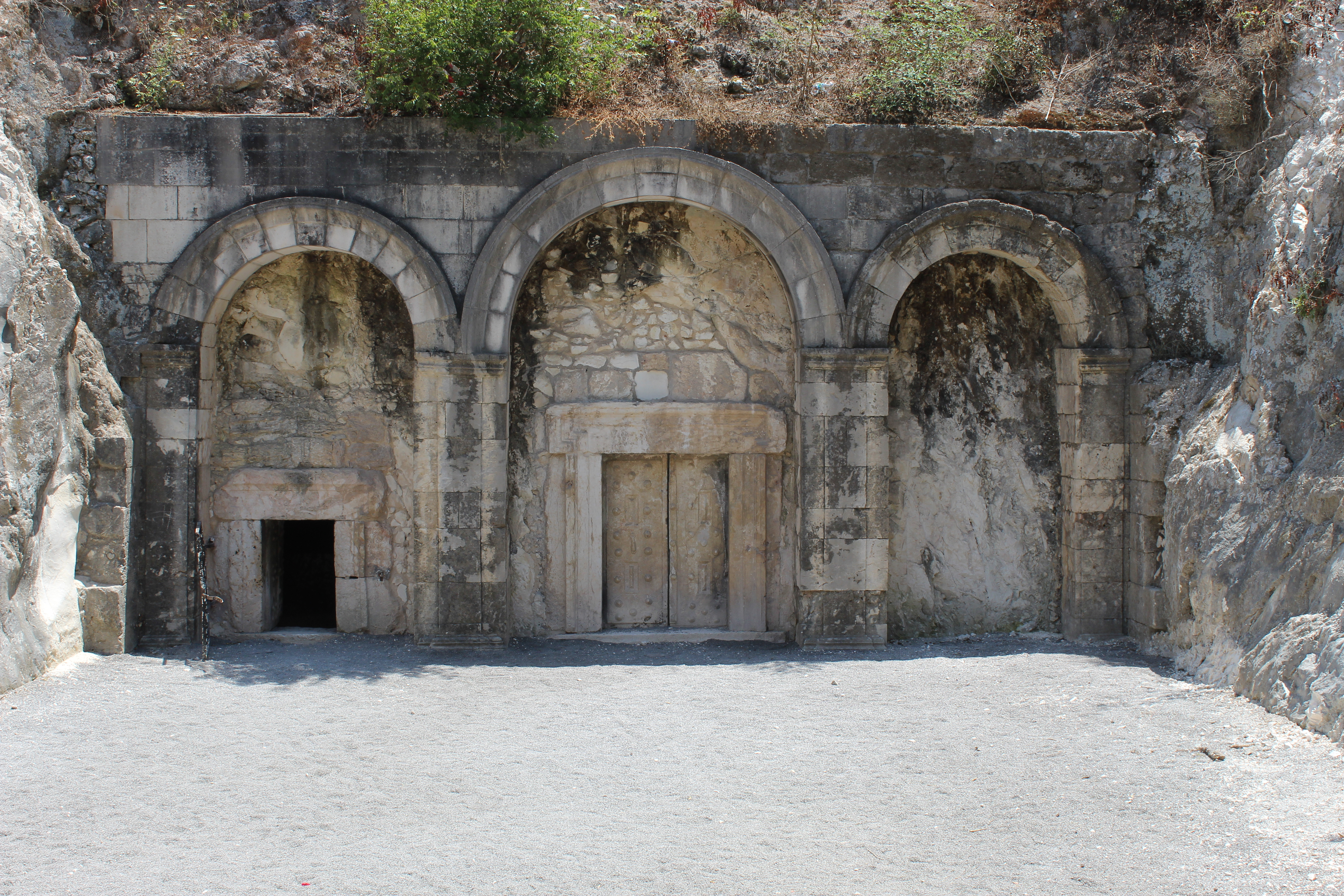
Façade of burial cave at Beit Shearim necropolis (reconstructed)

== Site description ==
The village site retains the stone foundation of what appears to be a large synagogue (35 × 15 m) and other public buildings in the northeastern quarter of the ruins. A hall directly in front of the synagogue entrance was aligned with two rows of columns, each row containing eight pillars. One large structure (40 × 15 m) on the southwestern part of the hill is thought to have been a basilica which, under the Jewish custom of the time, buildings of such size were used primarily for kings holding court, or for baths, or for royal treasuries. It was constructed of large, smooth-bossed ashlars that were coated with thick plaster. The basilica contained two rows of seven square pillars. Archaeologists have also identified a late Roman "stepped pool" in Beit Shearim, and three 3rd to 4th-century ritual baths (mikveh) on the ancient site. Ancient stone-pavements, cisterns, and walls of hewn-stone can still be seen on the site. Byzantine mosaics have also been found at the site. Remains of a gate and an oil press from the Byzantine period were discovered at the northern edge of the summit, but are thought to have been built in an earlier time.

=== Necropolis ===
In the 3rd and 4th centuries CE, the Beit Shearim necropolis became a popular place for Diaspora Jews to send their dead for burial. In 2015, the necropolis was recognised as a UNESCO World Heritage Site.

The cemetery forms the largest known Jewish necropolis in the Levant. Based on the inscriptions found at the necropolis, Jews were being brought for interment at Beit Shearim from all throughout the Jewish Diaspora, such as Beirut, Sidon, Palmyra, Messene in Babylonia and Himyar. The burial caves date from the beginning of the 3rd-century CE.

In wake of the excavations conducted under Nahman Avigad, Avigad remarked: "The fact that in one catacomb nearly one hundred and thirty sarcophagi were discovered, and that there had previously been many more, makes it one of the foremost catacombs of ancient times in so far as the use of sarcophagi is concerned." Conservation work in the catacombs at Beit Shearim has been carried out over the years, in order to check the decay and to preserve old structures.

== History ==
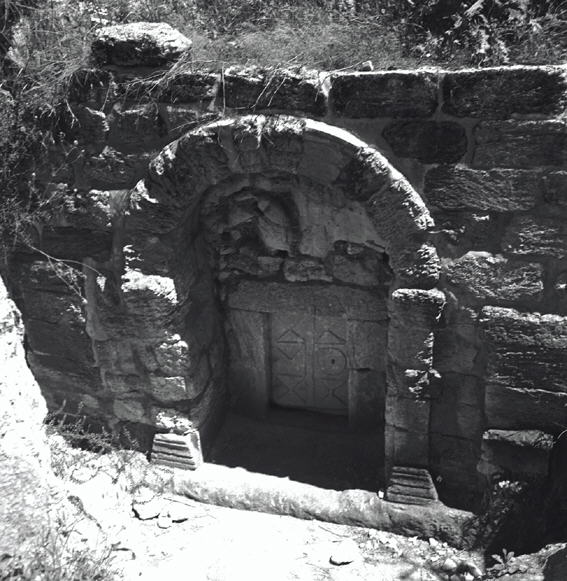
1944 excavations of Sheikh Abreik (Beit Shearim)

Pottery shards discovered at the site indicate that a first settlement there dates back to the Iron Age.

Under Roman rule, it lay within the royal estate of the Herodian dynasty, where Berenice, the sister of Herod Agrippa II stored grain, and marked the border with Ptolemais. The site Beit Shearim is mentioned in the Talmud, along with Yavne, Usha, Shefar'am and Sepphoris, as one of ten migratory journeys taken by the Sanhedrin when it uprooted from Jerusalem. Beit She'arim was also the home and final resting place of Rabbi Judah the Prince (Judah Ha-Nasi), compiler of the Mishnah and Head of the Sanhedrin. An anecdote about communal life in Beit Shearim has come down in his name and alludes to the practice of its people being observant in the laws of Jewish ritual purity. The Mishnaic sage, Rabbi Johanan ben Nuri (1st–2nd century), also made his home in Beit Shearim. During its Jewish settlement in the Second Temple period, the inhabitants of Beit Shearim are believed to have been occupied in husbandry, but when the village land later became a popular burial ground for Diaspora Jews, from nearby Phoenicia to far away Himyar in Yemen, many of the villagers are thought to have worked in funeral preparations (obsequies) and in stone-masonry.

Benjamin Mazar described the village as a prosperous Jewish town that was eventually destroyed in the first half of the 4th century (ca. 351/2 CE), at the end of the Jewish revolt against Gallus, during which time many towns and villages in Galilee and Judea were assigned to the flames, including Sepphoris. After some time it was renewed as a Byzantine city. More recent research shows that the Gallus revolt had a much lesser impact on the town. The Galilee earthquake of 363 is said to have damaged Beit Shearim, although its damages thought to have been limited. The presence of buildings and mosaics dated to the 6th century seem to indicate that there was a renewal of the settlement to some extent during this time, though it did not return to its former prosperity.

During the late Byzantine era, the necropolis fell into disuse, notwithstanding signs of human occupancy during the Byzantine period, all throughout the 6th-century, and into the early Arab period, although dwindling in importance.

By the late 16th-century, the village appeared in Ottoman records under the name Sheikh Bureik (Arabic: شيخ ابريق), although it is uncertain when it was first given this name. The village was depopulated in the 1920s after the Sursuk family of Lebanon – who had bought the land from the Ottoman government in 1875 – sold the village to the Jewish National Fund.

== See also ==
- Ancient synagogues in the Palestine region
- Ancient synagogues in Israel
- Archaeology of Israel
- Usha (city)
- Vigna Randanini – Jewish catacombs in Rome, 2nd–5th century

== Bibliography ==
- Avigad, N. (n.d.). Beit-Shearim (in Hebrew). Tel-Aviv: Sirtonei-Israel. (published between 1961 and 1969)
- Avigad, N.; Schwabe, M. (1954). Excavations at Beit She'arim, 1953 - Preliminary Report. Jerusalem: Israel Exploration Society.
- Avigad, N. (1958). Excavations at Beit She'arim, 1955 - Preliminary Report. Jerusalem: Israel Exploration Society.
- Conder, C.R. (1879). Tent Work in Palestine - A Record of Discovery and Adventure. Vol. 2. London: Richard Bentley & Son.
- Conder, C.R.; Kitchener, H.H. (1881). The Survey of Western Palestine: Memoirs of the Topography, Orography, Hydrography, and Archaeology. Vol. 1. London: Committee of the Palestine Exploration Fund.
- Freedman, D.N., ed. (1992), The Anchor Bible Dictionary, vol. 1 (A–C), New York: Doubleday, ISBN 0-385-19351-3
- Guérin, V. (1880). Description Géographique Historique et Archéologique de la Palestine (in French). Vol. 3: Galilee, pt. 1. Paris: L'Imprimerie Nationale.
- Hirschberg, H.Z. [in Hebrew] (1946). Yisrā'ēl ba-'Arāb (ישראל בערב) (in Hebrew). Tel Aviv: Mosad Byaliḳ ʻal-yede "Masadah". OCLC 19161564.
- Hütteroth, W.-D. [in German]; Abdulfattah, Kamal (1977). Historical Geography of Palestine, Transjordan and Southern Syria in the Late 16th Century. Erlangen. ISBN 3-920405-41-2.
- Ilan, Zvi [in Hebrew] (1991). Ancient Synagogues in Israel (in Hebrew). Ministry of Defence Israel. OCLC 180611930. -- ISBN 9650505229
- Leibner, Uzi (2009). Settlement and History in Hellenistic, Roman, and Byzantine Galilee - An Archaeological Survey of the Eastern Galilee. Tübingen: Mohr Siebeck. ISBN 978-3-16-149871-8.
- Maisler, B. (1937). "The Second Campaign of Excavations at Beth Sheʿarim (Sheikh Abreiq), 1937". Yediot - Bulletin of the Jewish Palestine Exploration Society (in Hebrew). 5 (3). OCLC 5792956368. - (OCLC 50332017)
- Mason, Steven Neil (2001). Life of Josephus, in Flavius Josephus, Translation and Commentary. Leiden: Brill. ISBN 978-9-004-11793-8.
- Mazar (Maisler), B. (1957). Beth She'arim - Report on the Excavations during 1936–40 (in Hebrew). Vol. 1 (The Catacombs I–IV). Jerusalem: Israel Exploration Society. OCLC 492594574. (reprinted from 1944 edition)
- Miller, Stuart S. (2015). At the Intersection of Texts and Material Finds (Stepped Pools, Stone Vessels, and Ritual Purity among the Jews of Roman Galilee). Bristol, CT: Vandenhoeck & Ruprecht. ISBN 978-3-525-55069-4.
- Negev, Avraham; Gibson, S., eds. (2001), Archaeological Encyclopedia of the Holy Land, New York: Continuum, ISBN 0826413161
- Negev, Avraham; Gibson, S. (2005). Archaeological encyclopedia of the Holy Land (4th, revised, illustrated ed.). Continuum International Publishing Group. ISBN 9780826485717.
- Rogers, Guy MacLean (2021). For the Freedom of Zion: the Great Revolt of Jews against Romans, 66-74 CE. New Haven: Yale University Press. ISBN 978-0-300-24813-5.
- Schumacher, G. (1888). "Population list of the Liwa of Akka". Quarterly Statement - Palestine Exploration Fund. 20: 169–191.
- Schwabe, Moshe [in Hebrew] (1939). "A Graeco-Jewish Inscription from Beth Shearim / אפיגרמה יוונית-יהודית מבית שערים". Bulletin of the Jewish Palestine Exploration Society (in Hebrew). ו' (ג'). Israel Exploration Society. JSTOR 23723987.
- Schwabe, Moshe [in Hebrew]; Lifshitz, Baruch (1956). "A Graeco-Jewish Epigram from Beth She'arim". Israel Exploration Journal. 5 (2): 78–88. JSTOR 27924651.
- Sherira Gaon (1988). The Iggeres of Rav Sherira Gaon. Translated by Nosson Dovid Rabinowich. Jerusalem: Rabbi Jacob Joseph School Press - Ahavath Torah Institute Moznaim. OCLC 923562173.
- Shpigel, Noa; Feinberg Vamosh, Miriam (6 July 2015). "Second Temple-era Catacomb Beit She'arim Declared UNESCO World Heritage Site". Haaretz.
- Stern, Karen B. (2015), Working Women? Professions of Jewish Women in the Late Ancient Levant, in Susan Ashbrook Harvey, Nathaniel DesRosiers, Shira L. Lander, Jacqueline Z. Pastis, Daniel Ullucci, A Most Reliable Witness: Essays in Honor of Ross Shepard Kraemer, SBL Press, ISBN 978-1-930-67596-4
- Stern, Karen B. (2020), Writing on the Wall: Graffiti and the Forgotten Jews of Antiquity, Princeton University Press, ISBN 978-0-691-21070-4
- Vitto, Fanny (1996). "Byzantine Mosaics at Bet She'arim: New Evidence for the History of the Site". 'Atiqot. 28: 115–146. JSTOR 23458348.
- Zaharoni, M. [in Hebrew] (1978). Israel Guide - Lower Galilee and Kinneret Region (A useful encyclopedia for the knowledge of the country) (in Hebrew). Vol. 3. Jerusalem: Keter Publishing House, in affiliation with the Israel Ministry of Defence. pp. 36–45. OCLC 745203905., s.v. בית שערים
