= Beit She'arim =

Beit She'arim may refer to:

- Beit She'arim (Roman-era Jewish village)
  - Sheikh Bureik, the Palestinian village which succeeded the above
- Beit She'arim (moshav), a village in Israel
- Beit She'arim National Park, a park centred around the necropolis of the Roman-era Jewish village
