= Sheikh Bureik =

- الشيخ بريك/الشيخ اِبريق
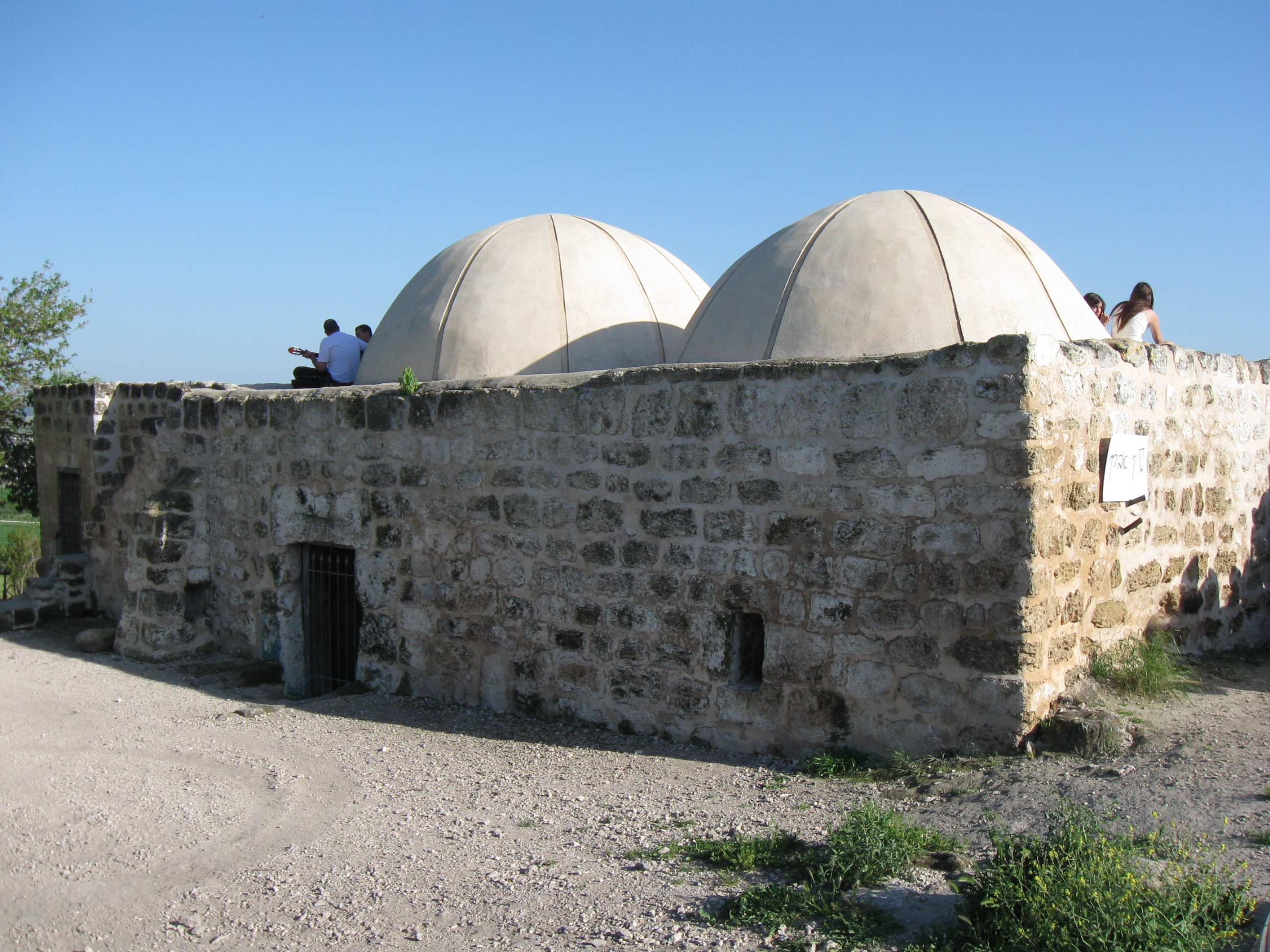
- Sheikh Abreik shrine, 2011

- Location within Mandatory Palestine
- Alternative names: Sheikh Abreik or Sheikh Ibreik

General information
- Type: Maqam
- Location: Israel
- Coordinates: 32°42′08″N 35°07′45″E
- Palestine grid: 162/234

Sheikh Bureik (Arabic: الشيخ بريك او الشيخ اِبريق), locally called Sheikh Abreik or Sheikh Ibreik in recent times, was a Palestinian Arab village located 10 miles (16 km) southeast of Haifa. Situated at an ancient site that shows evidence of habitation as early as the Iron Age, it was known as Beit She'arayim in the Roman and Byzantine periods and became an important center of Jewish learning in the 2nd century, with habitation continuing during the Early Islamic period and limited signs of activity from the Crusader period.

The village appears under the name Sheikh Bureik in 16th century Ottoman archives. Named for a local Muslim saint to whom a shrine was dedicated that remains standing to this day, it was a small village whose inhabitants were primarily agriculturalists. Rendered tenant farmers in the late 19th century after the Ottoman authorities sold the village lands to the Sursuk family of Lebanon, the village was depopulated in the 1920s after this family of absentee landlords in turn sold the lands to the Jewish National Fund.

A new Jewish settlement, also named Sheikh Abreik, was established there in 1925. Excavations at the site in 1936 revealed the ancient city, known in Greek as Besara and identified as Beth Shearim by Benjamin Mazar. The excavated part of the ancient town has become the Beit She'arim National Park, which is managed by the Israel Nature and Parks Authority.

== Name ==
The site is first mentioned in the writings of Josephus, the 1st-century Jewish historian under the name Besara. The Arab village was named for a Muslim saint (wali) known as Sheikh Abreik for whom a two-domed shrine was erected which is still a site of pilgrimage (ziyara). The name translates from Arabic into English as "the sheikh of the small pitcher". It has also been suggested that the name Abreik recalls the name of Barak, the military general mentioned in the Bible's Book of Judges as the son of Abinoam.

Following excavations in 1936 of an ancient city located on the hill upon which the village had been located, Benjamin Mazar identified the site as Beth Shearim, and this has been the official name of the site ever since, although the more accurate ancient name had been Bet She'arayim. Prior to Mazar's identification, it was thought that Sheikh Abreik was the ancient Geba, near Carmel.

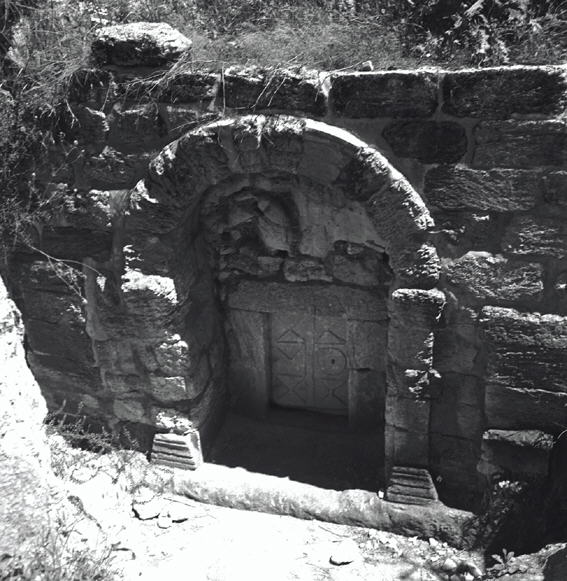
Sheikh Bureik part of excavations 1944

== Sheikh Abreik shrine ==
A small double-domed Maqam (shrine) holding the tomb of a Muslim saint, Sheikh Abreik or Ibreik, stands on the ridge of the hill and is still a site of ziyārah-type pilgrimage. At the time of the Survey of Western Palestine, its interior was painted red. Gottlieb Schumacher noted in the 1890s that: "The shrine of Sheik Abreik is still highly venerated by the Bedouin of the Merj ibn Amir. According to their tradition the Sheikh lived [before] the Prophet; it is a fact, that if you take an oath from a Bedawy, and make him swear by Sheikh Abreik, he will not deceive you." Tawfiq Canaan, the Palestinian physician and ethnographer, who wrote about the shrine of Sheikh Abriek in 1927, noted that it was also a site frequented by women seeking to remedy infertility: "After a barren woman has taken a bath in el-Matba'ah she washes herself in Ein Ishaq ["Spring of Isaac"]; she goes then to ash-shekh Ibreik to offer a present." Sheikh Abreik is described by Moshe Sharon as a local saint believed to have bestowed the nearby swamp of al-Matba'ah with healing properties that were said to be useful in treating rheumatism and nervous disorders. Sharon sees the possibility that an Abbasid-period poem found written on the wall of a nearby catacomb might mark the beginning of the maqām of Shaykh Abreik.

== History ==
=== Iron Age ===
Pottery shards discovered at the site indicate that a first settlement there dates back to the Iron Age.

=== Roman and Byzantine periods ===
Beit She'arim was founded at the end of the 1st century BCE, during the reign of King Herod. The Roman Jewish historian Josephus Flavius, in his Vita, referred to the city in Greek as Besara, the administrative center of the estates of Queen Berenice in the Jezreel Valley.

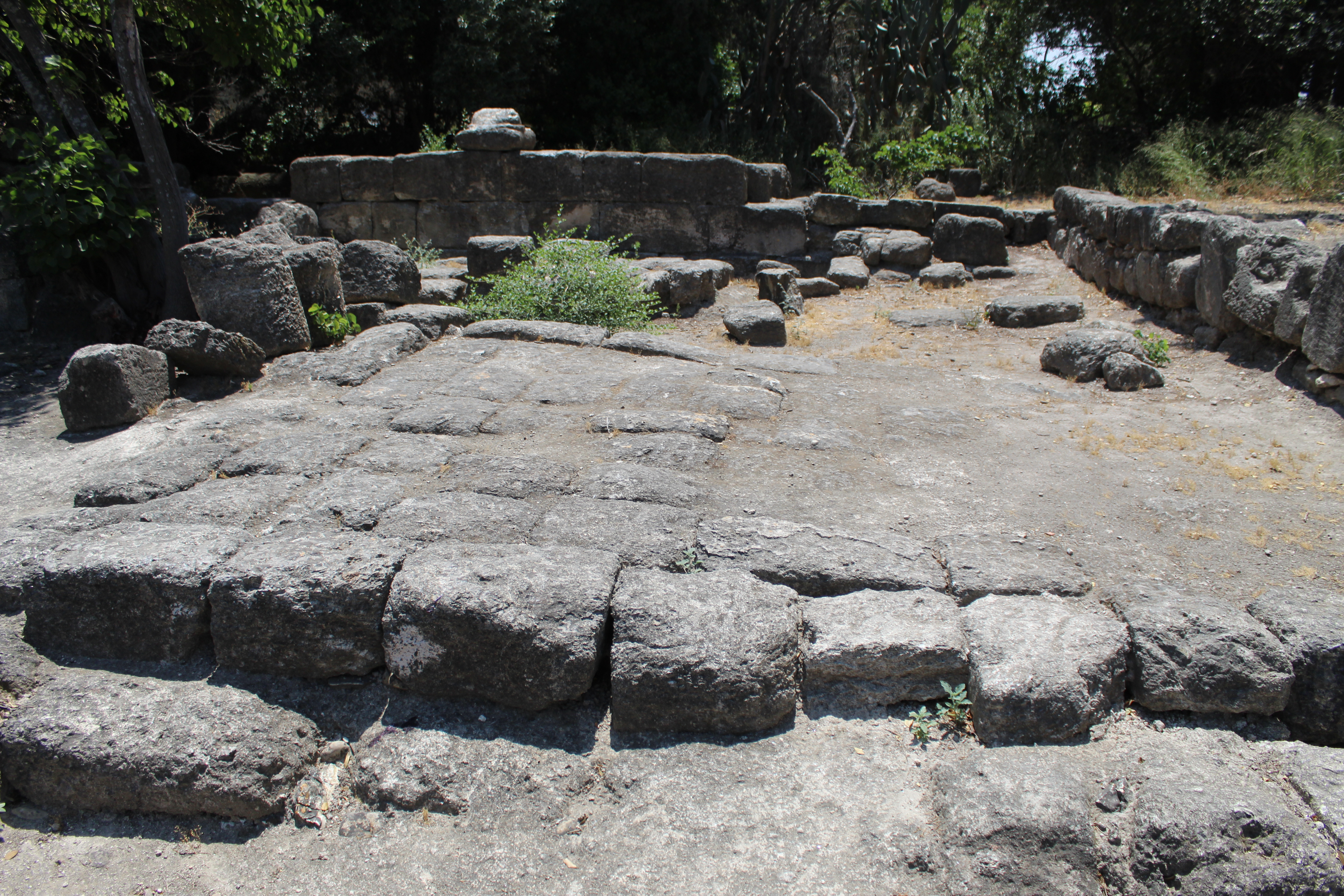
Basalt-stone pavement at Sheikh Bureik (Beit She'arim (Roman-era Jewish village) ruin) in Lower Galilee

After the destruction of the Second Temple in 70 CE, the Sanhedrin (Jewish legislature and supreme council) moved to Beit She'arim. The town is mentioned in rabbinical literature as an important center of Jewish learning during the 2nd century. Rabbi Judah the Prince (Yehudah HaNasi), head of the Sanhedrin and compiler of the Mishna, lived there and was buried there, as were many other Jews from all over the country and from the Jewish diaspora from nearby Phoenicia to far away Himyar in Yemen.

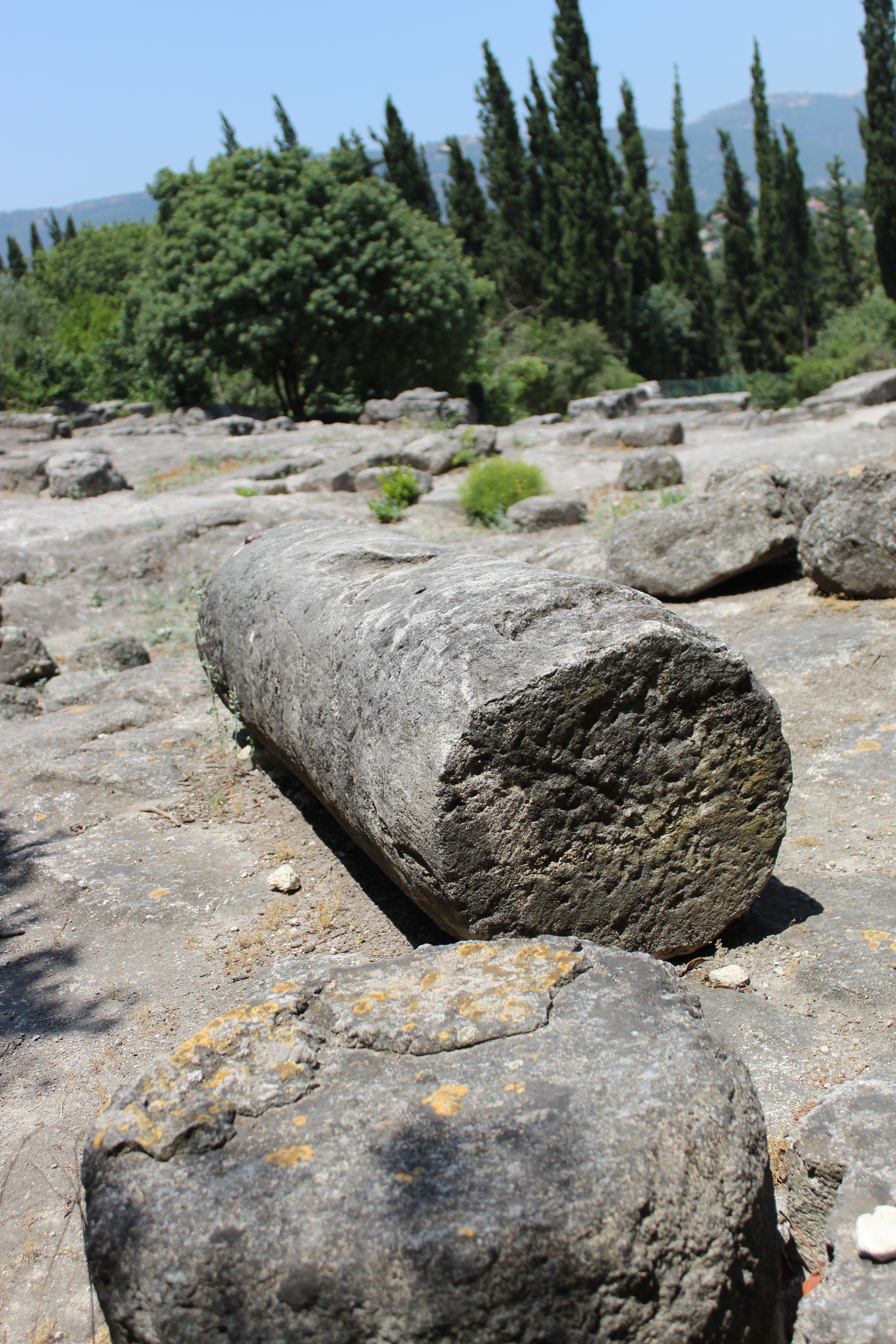
Stone column at Sheikh Bureik (Beit She'arim (Roman-era Jewish village))

While it was originally thought that Beit She'arim was destroyed during the Jewish revolt against Gallus in the mid-4th century, recent research has revealed the destruction to be far less extensive. An earthquake in 386 caused some damage, but the town recovered and enjoyed prosperity during the era of Byzantine rule. Almost 300 inscriptions primarily in Greek, but also in Hebrew, Aramaic, and Palmyrene were found on the walls of the catacombs containing numerous sarcophagi.

=== Early Islamic period ===
From the beginning of the Early Islamic period (7th century), settlement was sparse. The site shows signs of industrial activity from the Early Islamic Umayyad and Abbasid periods. Excavations uncovered 75 lamps dating to the period of Umayyad (7th–8th centuries) and Abbasid (8th–13th centuries) rule over Palestine.

==== Glassmaking industry ====
In 1956, a bulldozer working at the site unearthed an enormous rectangular slab, 11×6.5×1.5 feet, weighing 9 tons. Initially, it was paved over, but it was eventually studied and found to be a gigantic piece of glass. A glassmaking furnace was located here in the 9th century during the Abbasid period, which produced great batches of molten glass that were cooled and later broken into small pieces for crafting glass vessels.

==== Poem from Abbasid period ====
An elegy written in Arabic script typical of the 9–10th century and containing the date AH 287 or 289 (CE 900 or 902) was found in the Magharat al-Jahannam ("Cave of Hell") catacomb during excavations conducted there in 1956. Composed by the previously unknown poet Umm al-Qasim, whose name is given in acrostic in the poem, it reads as follows:

I lament the defender (who passed away)

While desire within his breast is still afire.

His generosity was not very manifest to the eye,

So that the envious ones neglect desiring him.

Yearning (for him) has made his resting place

(a site of) wakefulness and a shrine where people stay.

The blessing of beauty he enjoyed. Can any thing equal them

in the worlds? Nothing to match them can be found.

Closer come the Ages, but distance they cause;

for nearness they aspire, but friends they keep afar.

Were Desire to cause blame (to a person), (still) it could not subdue (him);

And if man's fortune does not ascend, he (too will) not rise.

Ask about it, and the experienced ones will tell thee

That Time combines both blame and praise:

As long as limpid it remains, life is happy, blissful

But once it turbid turns, miserable is life and painful

And wrote Ahmad b. Muhammad b. Bishr b. Abu Dulaf al-Abdi, and in these verses is a name. Take from the beginning of each verse one letter and you should comprehend it. And it was written in the month of Rabi II in the year 287 (or 289).

Moshe Sharon speculates that this poem might be marking the beginning of the practice of treating this site as the sanctuary of Shaykh Abreik and suggests the site was used for burial at this time and possibly later as well. He further notes that the cave within which the inscription was found forms part of a vast area of ancient ruins which constituted a natural place for the emergence of a local shrine. Drawing on the work of Tawfiq Canaan, Sharon cites his observation that 32% of the sacred sites he visited in Palestine were located in the vicinity of ancient ruins.

=== Crusader period ===
There is some evidence of activity in the former city area and necropolis dating to the Crusader period (12th century), probably connected to travellers and temporary settlement.

=== Village under Ottoman rule ===
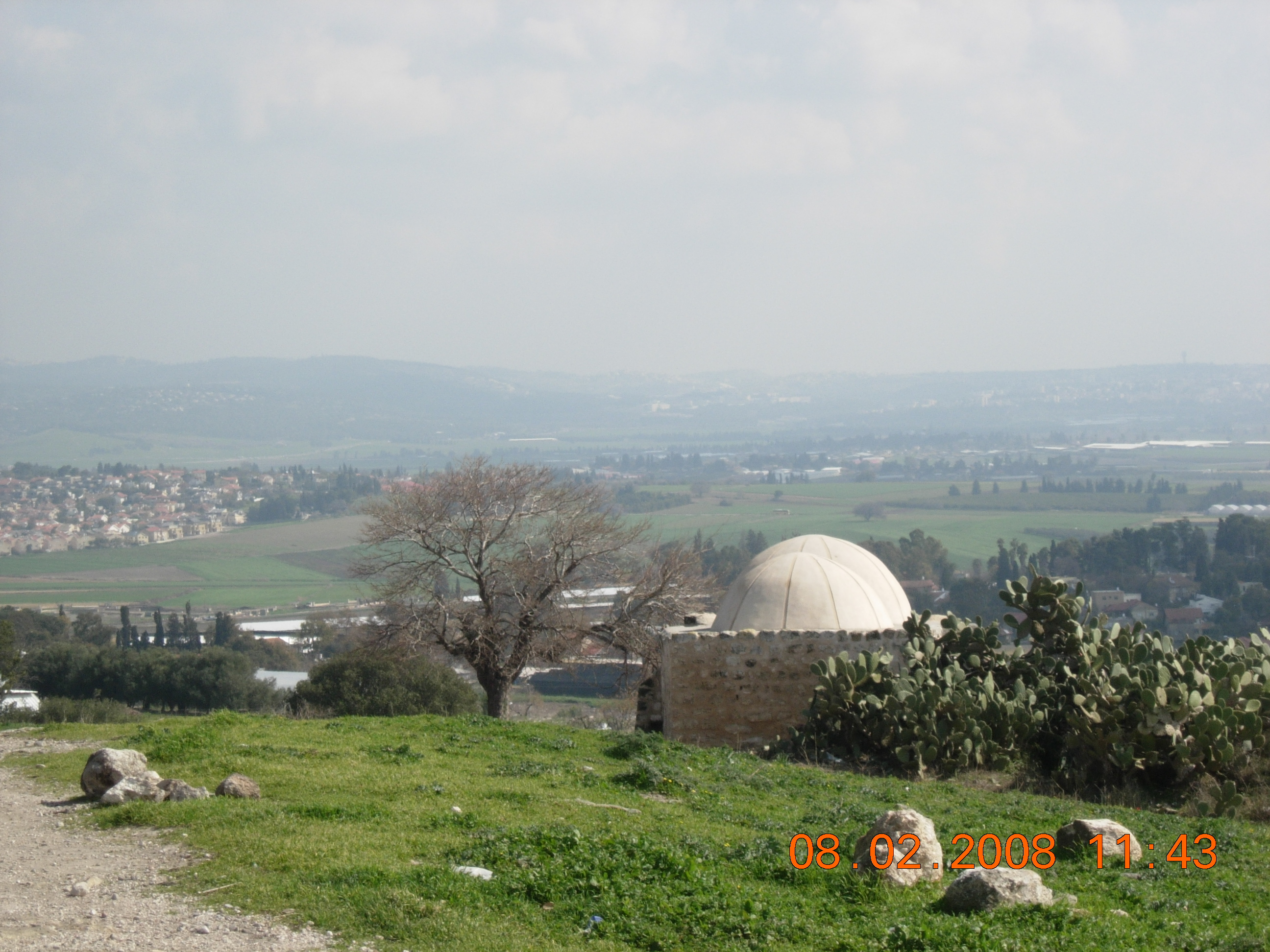
Sheikh Abreik shrine, February 2008. The village was named for its local Muslim saint to whom a shrine (Arabic: wely) was dedicated and whose remain standing to this day.

Sheikh Bureik, like the rest of Palestine, fell under the rule of the Ottoman Empire between the 16th and 20th centuries. The village appears under the name Sheikh Bureik in 16th century Ottoman archives. In the imperial daftar for 1596, it is recorded as a village of 22 Muslim families located in the nahiya of Shafa in the liwa of Lajjun, whose inhabitants paid taxes on wheat, barley and summer crops. A map by Pierre Jacotin from Napoleon's invasion of 1799 showed the place, named as Cheik Abrit.

In 1859, the tillage of the village was 16 feddans. In 1872, the Ottoman authorities sold Shayk Abreik (together with a total of 23 villages and some seventy square miles of land) for £20,000 to the Sursuk family of Lebanon. In 1875, Victor Guérin found it to have 350 inhabitants.

In 1881, "The Survey of Western Palestine" describes Sheikh Abreik as a small village situated on a hill with a conspicuous Maqam (sanctuary) located to the south. The village houses were made mostly of mud, and it belonged to the Sursuk family. The population at this time was estimated to be around 150.

A population list from about 1887 showed that Sheikh Abreik had about 395 inhabitants; all Muslims.

During World War I, the "finest oaks" of Sheikh Bureik were "ruthlessly destroyed" by the Turkish Army for use as rail fuel.

=== Village under British Mandatory rule ===
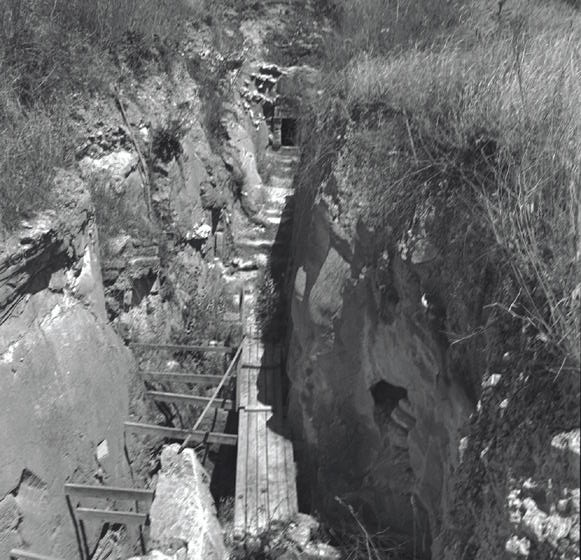
Sheikh Bureik 1944 photograph of excavations

During the period of Mandate Palestine, in the October 1922 census of Palestine, the population of Sheikh Bureik was recorded as 111 Muslims (51 male and 60 female). The villagers were primarily agriculturalists, who were made tenant farmers in the late 19th century after the Ottoman authorities sold the village lands to the Sursuk family of Lebanon, who assumed the title of absentee landlords.

The area was acquired by the Jewish community as part of the Sursock Purchase. At some time during the early 1920s, the Sursuk family sold the lands of the village to the Jewish National Fund, purchased in the name of the "Palestine Land Development Company" via Yehoshua Hankin, a Zionist activist who was responsible for most of the major land purchases of the World Zionist Organization in Ottoman Palestine. The land purchased by the JNF were classified by the Government of Palestine under "miri property," meaning, lands given out for conditional public use, while ultimate ownership lay with the Government; or what is tantamount to private usufruct State land. After the sale, which included lands from the Arab villages of Harithiya, Sheikh Abreik and Harbaj, a total of 59 Arab tenants were evicted from the three villages, with 3,314 pounds compensation paid. The Muslim shrine on the site was not sold and fell to the administration of the Government of Palestine.

In 1926-7 an agricultural settlement was established by the Hapoel HaMizrachi, a Zionist political party and settlement movement; the village continued to be called by its Arabic name Sheikh Abreik. By 1930, the new Jewish settlement had a population of 45 spanning an area of 1,089 dunams. In 1940, the High Commissioner of the British Mandate for Palestine placed the village in Zone B for land transfers, meaning that transfer of land to a person other than a Palestinian Arab was permitted in certain specified circumstances.

== See also ==
- Al-Khansa (7th century), the best known female poet in Arabic literature, famous for her elegies
- Beit She'arim National Park
- List of villages depopulated during the Arab–Israeli conflict

== Bibliography ==
- Abu El Haj, N. (2001): Facts on the Ground: Archaeological Practice and Territorial Self-Fashioning in Israeli Society(p.81..more about Bet Shearim)
- Avneri, Arieh L. (1984). The Claim of Dispossession: Jewish Land-settlement and the Arabs, 1878–1948. Transaction Publishers. ISBN 0-87855-964-7.
- Barron, J.B., ed. (1923). Palestine: Report and General Abstracts of the Census of 1922. Government of Palestine.
- Canaan, T. (1927). Mohammedan Saints and Sanctuaries in Palestine. London: Luzac & Co.
- Conder, C.R.; Kitchener, H.H. (1881). The Survey of Western Palestine: Memoirs of the Topography, Orography, Hydrography, and Archaeology. Vol. 1. London: Committee of the Palestine Exploration Fund. (Sharon, 2004, mentions p.325, p.345, p. 346, p. 347, p. 348, p.349, p. 350, and p.351)
- Conder, C.R. (1887). Syrian Stone-Lore; Or, the Monumental History of Palestine.
- Guérin, V. (1880). Description Géographique Historique et Archéologique de la Palestine (in French). Vol. 3: Galilee, pt. 1. Paris: L'Imprimerie Nationale.
- Hütteroth, W.-D.; Abdulfattah, K. (1977). Historical Geography of Palestine, Transjordan and Southern Syria in the Late 16th Century. Erlanger Geographische Arbeiten, Sonderband 5. Erlangen, Germany: Vorstand der Fränkischen Geographischen Gesellschaft. ISBN 3-920405-41-2.
- Karmon, Y. (1960). "An Analysis of Jacotin's Map of Palestine" (PDF). Israel Exploration Journal. 10 (3, 4): 155–173, 244–253.
- Masterman, Ernest William Gurney (1909). Studies in Galilee. Chicago: The University of Chicago press. OCLC 250486251.
- Mazar, B.; Ḥevrah la-ḥaḳirat Erets-Yiśraʼel ṿe-ʻatiḳoteha (1976), Beth Sheʻarim: Mazar, B. Catacombs 1–4: Volume 1 of Beth Sheʻarim: Report on the Excavations During 1936–1940, Ḥevrah la-ḥaḳirat Erets-Yiśraʼel ṿe-ʻatiḳoteha (Illustrated ed.), Rutgers University Press on behalf of the Israel Exploration Society and the Institute of Archaeology, Hebrew University, ISBN 9780813507309
- Negev, Avraham; Gibson, S. (2005). Archaeological encyclopedia of the Holy Land (4th, revised, illustrated ed.). Continuum International Publishing Group. ISBN 9780826485717.
- Oliphant, L. (1887). Haifa, or Life in Modern Palestine. (visited Sheik Abreik and "The Cave of Hell" in 1883; see p.38 ff.)
- Palmer, E.H. (1881). The Survey of Western Palestine: Arabic and English Name Lists Collected During the Survey by Lieutenants Conder and Kitchener, R. E. Transliterated and Explained by E.H. Palmer. Committee of the Palestine Exploration Fund.
- Schumacher, G. (1888). "Population list of the Liwa of Akka". Quarterly Statement – Palestine Exploration Fund. 20: 169–191.
- Schumacher, G. (1899). "Reports from Galilee". Quarterly Statement – Palestine Exploration Fund. 31 (4): 339–343. doi:10.1179/peq.1899.31.4.339.
- Sharon, M. (2004). Corpus Inscriptionum Arabicarum Palaestinae, D-F. Vol. 3. BRILL. ISBN 90-04-13197-3.
- Stein, K.W. (1987). The Land Question in Palestine, 1917-1939. UNC Press. ISBN 0-8078-4178-1.
- Singer, A. (2002). Constructing Ottoman Beneficence: An Imperial Soup Kitchen in Jerusalem. Albany: State University of New York Press. ISBN 0-7914-5352-9.
- Sufian, Sandra Marlene (2007). Healing the land and the nation: malaria and the Zionist project in Palestine, 1920-1947. University of Chicago Press BRILL. ISBN 9780226779386.
