= Shimron =

Archaeological site, nature reserve in the Jezreel Valley, Israel

Tel Shimron
- תל שמרון (Hebrew)
- Simonias, Semmoune
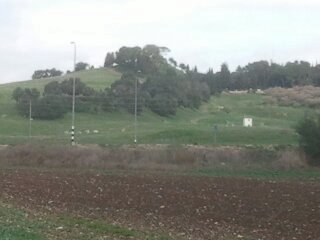
- Interactive map of Tel Shimron
- 32°42′13″N 35°12′50″E
- Type: Archaeological site
- Periods: Neolithic, Chalcolithic, Bronze Age, Iron Age, Persian, Hellenistic, Roman, Byzantine, Early Islamic, Crusader, Mamluk, Ottoman
- Location: Jezreel Valley, Israel
- Region: Lower Galilee

Site notes
- Area: 19.5 ha (48 acres)
- Excavation dates: 2004–2010, 2016–present
- Archaeologists: Yuval Portugali, Avner Raban, Nurit Feig, Yardenna Alexandre, Daniel M. Master, Mario A. S. Martin
- Condition: Ruined
- Public access: Yes

Tel Shimron (Hebrew: תל שמרון) is an archaeological site and nature reserve in the Jezreel Valley. Since 2016 the site is being excavated in cooperation with the Jezreel Valley Regional Project.

Shimron was a major city in the north of Israel mentioned in the Hebrew Bible. In Late Antiquity, it was known as Simonias (Hebrew: סימונייה), as attested to by Flavius Josephus. The Arabic name of the site is Tell Sammunia, also written Semmunieh or Semmoune. Tel Shimron is located on the western edge of the Nazareth range at the intersection of the Lower Galilee and the Jezreel Valley. The location, particularly due to its proximity to the Acre (Akko) Plain, made it an important trade route.

== History ==
=== Neolithic ===
Very little Neolithic material has been found at Tel Shimron, but during the 2010 excavation, a Pre-Pottery Neolithic B arrowhead as well as remains of the Wadi Rabah culture were discovered.

=== Chalcolithic ===
In the Chalcolithic period, there are sparse evidence of the Ghassulian Culture uncovered during the 2010 Excavation.

=== Early Bronze Age ===
Due to Middle Bronze remains that lie atop the Early Bronze strata, it is difficult to gain a detailed picture of the Early Bronze Age at Shimron.

==== Early Bronze I ====
In Early Bronze IB (c. 3300-3000 BCE), Tel Shimron was founded on the eastern portion of the tel.

==== Early Bronze II ====
In Early Bronze II (c. 3000-2750 BCE), there is little information about Shimron.

The EB II was characterized by climate variability and settlement reorganization. In the Southern Levant, the transition from EB IB-II was characterized by a decline in olive cultivation. Nearby Megiddo was in decline. In Egypt, the late 1st Dynasty and 2nd Dynasty represents a sequence of weak rulers, and trade with the Southern Levant halted.

==== Early Bronze III ====
There was a gap in settlement during EB III (c. 2750-2350 BCE). In Egypt, the Old Kingdom flourished with the 3rd and 4th dynasties and before decline started with the 5th dynasty with drier climate conditions from 2500 BCE onwards.

==== Early Bronze IV ====
In Early Bronze IV (c. 2350-2020 BCE) there are no signs of occupation. Esse (1991) suggested a continuation between EB III into MB I, but not evidence have supported this. Most sites in the Southern Levant struggled, were abandoned or destroyed. At the Transitional EB IVA-B, the region saw severe drought around 2200-2150 BCE (see 4.2 ka event) and a second drought at the Transitional EB IVB-MB IA at 2036-2023 BCE which ended the Early Bronze Age.

=== Middle Bronze Age ===
==== Middle Bronze I ====
In Middle Bronze I (c. 2020-1820 BCE), the end of the Early Bronze Age was due to climate change causing severe drought. A slow prosess of re-urbanization started in the second half of MB IA (c. 2020-1910/1900 BCE) and accelerated in MB IB (c. 1910/1900-1820 BCE) when regional powers start to emerge in the Northern Levant. This paved the way for the flourishing trade networks that saw urbanism thrive the following MB IIA period. Tel Shimron grew as a hub along the intersection of major trade routes (Akko/Tel Kabri to the west, Megiddo to the south, Hazor to the northeast).

==== Middle Bronze II ====
In Middle Bronze II (c. 1820-1550 BCE; MB IIA-C or MB II-III), Shimron became a fortified city-state around 1800 BCE. At its largest, Tel Shimron consisted of 19.5 hectares. Its size and location suggest that it was an important inland city in the interconnected trade network of growing ports and the Jezreel Valley trade route. A cylinder seal found, dating to the MB II, further attests the international nature of Shimron as a site along an important trade route during the MB. In general, Shimron is part of a larger trend of booming urbanism and fortification as well as international trade during the MB.

The juxtaposition of domestic activity in the lower city and monumental buildings on the acropolis provides an intriguing case of status differences in the Middle Bronze Age.

The site was mainly oriented toward the Northern Levant, dominated by the kingdoms of Yamhad and Qatna in Syria. There are also influences from the Middle Kingdom of Egypt in the south. The site may be mentioned as "š-mw-ʕ-nw" in the Egyptian Execration Texts.

In 2017, a cylinder seal dating to the 17th century BCE was discovered at Tel Shimron. Made of hematite in the Old Syrian Classic style, it measures 1.5 cm in length and 8.5 cm in width with a 2.5 mm diameter hole. The seal depicts a sphinx and lion fighting over a human and stag, with two vultures, a sun and crescent shape depicted over the fight. In addition, a hare and a bull's head are pictured to either side. The depictions draw on influences from Egypt, Mesopotamia, and Northern Syria, showing the international nature of the site in the 17th century.

==== Lower city ====
In the southwest corner of the site, Middle Bronze Age domestic buildings were excavated. Evidence of daily life in the Middle Bronze Age was found in the houses, including craft industries like metal working.

==== Acropolis ====
On the acropolis of the site, to the east, monumental Middle Bronze Age remains were discovered. While the pottery in this area is similar chronologically to that of the lower city domestic area, the quality and forms are different. For example, several whole and fragmented Nahariya bowls were found (Note: For more on this type of artefact see Liat Naeh (2012), abstract of Miniature vessels and seven-cupped bowls in the Middle Bronze Age temple of Nahariya, pp. 4, 16, 16; image of exhibit from the Met).) This area additionally contained a massive mudbrick corbelled passageway that was also discovered.

=== Late Bronze Age ===
During the Late Bronze I, a series of Egyptian military campaigns saw the Jezreel Valley become part of the Egyptian Empire. Military campaigns into the Southern Levant started with Ahmose I, with military campaigns far north by Thutmose I and the establishment of the "empire" by Thutmose III and Amenhotep II.

==== Late Bronze IIA ====
In Late Bronze IIA, most of the Southern Levant was part of the Egyptian Empire. Surveys indicate that Shimron shrunk somewhat in the late second millennium BCE. The Amarna Letter may provide the names of two rulers of Shimron, Kusuna (c. 1450? BCE; Thuthmose III) and Šum-Haddu (c. 1350 BCE).

The Amarna Letters (c. 1350 BCE) attest that it was still an important royal city in northern Canaan. The city is then known as Šamhuna. In EA 225 EA 261, and EA 224, Šammu-Hadi, king of Shimron, is shown as a vassal to the Egyptian pharaoh.

In Amarna Letter EA 224, the ruler of Shimron greets the Pharaoh: "Spea[k] to the ki[ng], [my] lo[rd], my [Sun god], a message from Šum-Haddu, [servant] of the king, my lord. I fall at the feet of the king, my lord, seven times and seven times." Later, he explains: "Inasmuch as the king, my lord, sent a message concerning barley (and) millet -- "Are they threshed?"—the king, my lord, should ask his commissioners if our forefathers were bringing (grain) since the days of Kusuna, our forefather." The letter shows that grain production based on barley and millet was important, with the grain being shipped to Egyptian storehouses and garrisons. It also mentions a forefather, Kusuna, who may have been a previous ruler of the city. When the Pharaoh inquires whether the grain is threshed, the local ruler does not give a simple “yes,” but instead refers to the Pharaoh's commissioner (regional overseer) and to the established practice of delivering grain since the time of the forefather Kusuna.

In Amarna Letter EA 225, the ruler of Shimron greets the Pharaoh: "Speak to the king, my lord, a message from Šum-Haddu, the ruler of Šamhuna. I fall at the foot of my king seven and seven times." He continues: "I am obeying the entirety of my king’s commands. As for the commissioner <whom> my king will give over <me>, I will obey the entirey of his commands (as well)." The letter shows the Pharaoh written in Akkadian as "LUGAL" (Great Man; i.e. Great King), while the ruler of Shimron uses the title "LU" (Man) in "LU₂-li₂1 ^{uru}ša-am-ḫu-na".

In Amarna Letter EA 8, Burraburiyash of Babylon complains to the pharaoh that Šum-Hadda (cf. Šammu-Hadi) and Sutana of Acco raided one of his caravans. The text indicates that Shimron was along an important trade route, and allianced western city-states like Acco. This is supported by Cypriot material found at the site. However, the reference seems to refer to another Šum-Adda from Ḫinnatuna to the north.

Say to Napḫurureya, king of Egypt, my brother Thus Burra-Buriyaš Great king the king of Karaduniyaš your brother For me all goes well For you your country your household your wives your sons your magnates your horses your chariots may all go very well. My brother and I made a mutual declaration of friendship and this is what we said 'Just as our fathers were friends with one another so will we be friends with one another Now my merchants who were on their way with Aḫu-ṭabu were detained in Canaan for business matters After Aḫu-ṭabu went on to my brother in Ḫinnatuna of Canaan Šum-Adda the son of Balumme and Šutatna the son of Šaratum of Akka having sent there men killed my merchants and took away their money I send ... post haste Inquire of him so that he may inform you Canaan is your country and its kings are your servants In your country I have been despoiled Bring them to account and make compensation for the money they took away Put to death the men who put my servants to death and so avenge my blood And if you don not put these men to death they are going to kill again be it a caravan of mine or your own messengers and so messengers between us will there-by be cut-off And if they try and deny this to you Šum-Adda having blocked the passage of one man of mine retained him in his company and another man having been forced into service by Šutatna of Akka is still serving him These men should be brought to you so you can investigate inquire whether they are dead and thus become informed As a greeting gift I send to you one mina of lapis-lazuli Send off my messenger immediately so I may know my brother's decision Do not detain my messenger Let him be off to me immediately

==== Late Bronze IIB ====
In the late 19th dynasty, drier climate caused distress and rebellion in the Egyptian Empire in the Southern Levant. During the reign of Merneptah, several city-states rebelled. The Merneptah Stele indicate that the Egyptian army tried to suppress and starve out the rebels in the Jezreel Valley (Yisrael; Israel) by attacking the grain production laying the fields waste.

According to Joshua 11, the king of Shimron was part of an alliance with the king of Hazor, which was defeated by Joshua. Joshua 19:15 places Shimron inside the allotment of the Tribe of Zebulun.

=== Iron Age ===
==== Iron I ====
Iron Age I was a transitional phase between the end of the Late Bronze Age (c. 1190 BCE) and Iron II (10th century BCE), characterized by climate instability and drought along with political turmoil. Iron Age remains were found in a silo cut into the Bronze Age fortifications. While the 2019 excavation did not allow for rigorous investigation of the Iron Age remains, the assemblage found in the silo is similar to that of Megiddo VI, which indicates a "Canaanite" population in the lowlands in the Iron Age I. A bronze bracelet and electrum sheeting were also found here.

==== Iron II ====
The exact political and social orientation of Tel Shimron during the Iron Age is unclear (Phoenicians W, Northern Kingdom of Israel SE).

==== Assyrian destruction ====
During the 8th century BC, Shimron was destroyed. Tiglath Pileser III of Assyria (r. 745–727 BCE) conducted military campaigns around 734-732 BCE. In a fragment of his annals, different cities taken by the Assyrians are recorded. One such site, although the list is badly broken, has been restored as Samhuna, which Nadav Na'aman and others have associated with Shimron. Tiglath Pileser III performed massive deportations in the Jezreel and Lower Galilee, and surveys in the area suggest it remained sparsely populated for centuries.

=== Persian period ===
In the Persian period use of the site resumed. The 2004 salvage excavation uncovered a Persian-period building that likely served a public function, which could indicate that Shimron had an administrative role in the area.

=== Hellenistic period ===
Finds from the Hellenistic period indicate substantial occupation during both the Ptolemaic and Seleucid eras. It is unclear, however, if the site was occupied after the withdrawal of Seleucid rule in the middle of the second century.

Feig's 2008 excavation uncovered a coin, which was likely struck in the Ashkelon Mint during the Ptolemaic Period.

Excavations on the western side of the site revealed a hoard of coins from the reign of Antiochus III, just at the moment when this region moved from Ptolemaic to Seleucid rule. There were also coins of Demetrius II; after which the site was abandoned.

=== Roman period ===
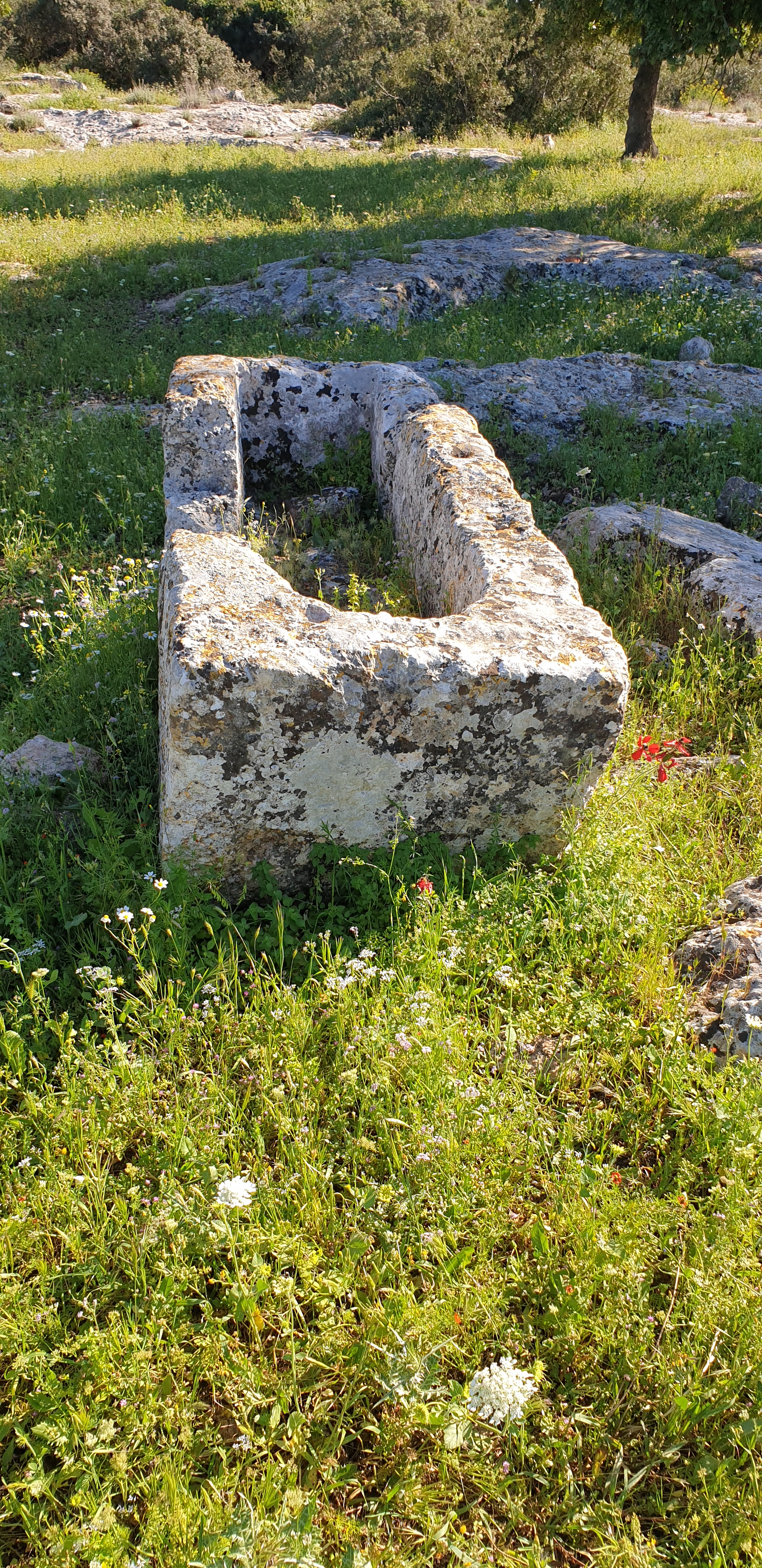
Rock-cut sarcophagus at Shimron

During the First Jewish–Roman War, and in 66 CE a battle occurred here between the Jewish rebels and the Romans, who besieged the city. Josephus, mentioning the village by name, states that it was attacked there at night by the Roman decurion, Æbutius, who had been entrusted with the charge of the Great Plain and who had one-hundred horses and two-hundred infantry at his disposal. The Roman soldiers, however, were forced to withdraw since their horses were of little use in that terrain (Life of Flavius Josephus, § 24).

During this era, Shimron was referred to as Simonias in Greek and Simonia in Rabbinic Hebrew and Aramaic, but the Jerusalem Talmud draws equivalency between the two, declaring "and Shimron is Simonia."

The surveys by Raban and Feig indicate occupation during the Roman period, but the site was likely part of the orbit of nearby Sepphoris. Part of the Leggio-Sepphoris road was excavated at Shimron in 2004, and proximity to this trade route probably benefitted Shimron. A massive ashlar wall was also uncovered in 2004, dating to the same period.

At the center of the site, several houses, dating to the 1st to 3rd centuries CE, were excavated in 2017. Both houses had entrance courtyards, and the rooms were divided by stone walls with 'windows.' These domestic structures were typical of Jewish Galilean villages in the Roman period and included a ritual bath (miqveh) in one of the houses.

=== Byzantine, Early Islamic, Crusader and Mamluk periods ===
There is little textual evidence of Shimron during the Early Islamic period, so Portugali's survey provides the clearest picture of the site during this period to date. Portugali identified two distinct settlements, a 3.9 dunam farmstead, showing a retraction from the 78.3 dunam Byzantine settlement, and a 12.8 dunam Mamluk village, which Portugali hypothesized was built over a Crusader occupation site.

Later, Shimron was mentioned by Ishtori Haparchi ("Kaftor wa-Feraḥ", ch. xi, written in 1322).

=== Late Ottoman rule ===
A map from Napoleon's invasion of 1799 by Pierre Jacotin showed a village on the site, named Sammouni.

In 1838, Edward Robinson found a small Arab village called Semunieh on the site.

In 1867, a group of German Templers attempted to establish an early German Templer Colony in Palestine on the site, which failed due to malaria.

In 1875, Victor Guérin noted:

"The present village has succeeded a small ancient city, now completely destroyed." He then goes on to describing the tell east of the village and other ancient remains (see above at Surveys and excavations).

In 1881, the PEF's Survey of Western Palestine (SWP) described the area as a small village on a knoll with three springs, having probably less than 100 inhabitants. A population list from about 1887 showed that Semunieh had about 100 inhabitants; all being Muslims.

Gottlieb Schumacher, as part of surveying for the construction of the Jezreel Valley railway, noted in 1900 that the village "had not increased [since the 1881 SWP survey] due to its unhealthy position and bad water.

=== British Mandate period ===
The area was acquired by the Jewish community as part of the Sursock Purchase. In 1936, the site became an agricultural training station for the Moshavim Movement. One group that trained on the site came from Nahalal and continued on to establish kibbutz Hanita.

In 1948, kibbutz Timorim was established on the site. Timorim became a moshav shitufi in 1953 and moved to the south of the country, due to lack of farming lands. When it was vacated, the area it had inhabited became a Ma'abara (transit camp) for new immigrants destined for Migdal Ha'Emek and Ramat Yishai.

== Nature reserve ==
In 1965, a 28-dunam nature reserve was declared, preserving the Apple-ring Acacia (syn. Acacia albida) trees that grow on the site. This is the northernmost occurrence of these trees in Israel. The Apple-ring Acacia, native to Africa and the Middle East, is used for nitrogen fixation, erosion control for crops, for food, drink and medicine. It sheds its leaves in the rainy season and is highly valued in agroforestry as it can grow among field crops without shading them.

== Excavations ==
=== Guérin, 1875 ===
In 1875, Victor Guérin wrote of Shimron:

"The present village has succeeded a small ancient city, now completely destroyed. East of the site which it occupied rises a round isolated hill, which commands the plain in every direction, and was once surrounded on its summit by a wall, of which a few traces still remain. This hill must probably have been fortified. Scarped towards the east, it slopes gently on the western side towards the town, which covered the lower hillocks at its feet. Among them I found, in the midst of the various debris which cover the soil, the remains of a building in cut stone, completely overthrown, once ornamented by columns, as is attested by two mutilated shafts lying on the spot. This edifice seems to have been constructed from east to west, so that it may have been a Christian church. "In another place I saw an enclosure measuring thirty-five paces in length by twenty-five in breadth. From a distance it appears ancient. It is, however, of modern date, constructed of stones of all sizes and shapes; among them pillars of broken sarcophagi".

=== 1982 survey ===
In 1982 the site was surveyed by Yuval Portugali and Avner Raban. Their finds included several tombs dating to the Middle Bronze II, Persian, Hellenistic, and Roman Periods, but Chalcolithic and Early Bronze I remains were discovered around the site, as well as evidence of Neolithic activity in the surrounding area.

=== IAA excavations (2004-2010) ===
In 2004, 2008 and 2010, salvage excavations were conducted adjacent to Tel Shimron by Nurit Feig and Yardenna Alexandre on behalf of the Israel Antiquities Authority (IAA).

==== 2004 excavation ====
Nurit Feig directed a salvage excavation on behalf of the IAA prior to the installation of electrical poles at the Bet Zarzir-Nahalal Junction road. Four squares were excavated, three of which were situated along the shoulder of the road, and the fourth was 200m to the west.

==== 2008 excavation ====
Feig conducted another IAA salvage dig prior to the construction of agricultural buildings. This excavation found several smaller walls and potsherds dating to the Early and Middle Bronze Ages as well as the Roman Period. Flint remains dated to the Neolithic as well as the Early Bronze Age.

==== 2010 excavation ====
Another salvage excavation was conducted on behalf of the IAA, this time by Yardenna Alexandre near the Nahalal junction ahead of a widening of Highway 75. A rural settlement dating to the Middle Bronze Age was uncovered along with Roman remains.

=== Tel Shimron Excavations (2016-) ===
In 2016, research began on the tel itself. The project is co-directed by Daniel M. Master and Mario A. S. Martin on behalf of the Institute of Archaeology at Tel Aviv University and Wheaton College, IL. This survey reached similar conclusions to the earlier work by Portugali and Raban. Middle Bronze Age remains were found close to the surface, and later periods were mostly represented at the center of the mound. However, ground-penetrating radar and magnetometry assays revealed strata from later periods overlaying the MB strata in certain areas, which led to the excavations of 2017 and 2019.

The first five years of excavation uncovered remains from the Middle Bronze Age and Iron Age as well as the Persian, Hellenistic, Roman, and Mamluk periods.

In 2023, excavators uncovered a mudbrick passageway with a corbelled arched roof, the first of its kind to be found in the southern Levant. While excavating the entrance to the passageway, the team found a "Nahariya bowl", a seven-cupped vessel which is thought to have had ritual function. In November 2024, archaeologists revealed the discovery of a monumental structure containing a large cache of rare cultic objects used by the Canaanites 3,800 years ago.

== Bibliography ==
- Conder, C.R.; Kitchener, H.H. (1882). The Survey of Western Palestine: Memoirs of the Topography, Orography, Hydrography, and Archaeology. Vol. 2. London: Committee of the Palestine Exploration Fund.
- Feig, Nurit (2007-12-13). "Tel Shimron". Hadashot Arkheologiyot (119). Hadashot Arkheologiyot – Excavations and Surveys in Israel.
- Feig, Nurit (2009-06-02). "Tel Shimron". Hadashot Arkheologiyot (121). Hadashot Arkheologiyot – Excavations and Surveys in Israel.
- Guérin, V. (1880). Description Géographique Historique et Archéologique de la Palestine (in French). Vol. 3: Galilee, pt. 1. Paris: L'Imprimerie Nationale.
- Karmon, Y. (1960). "An Analysis of Jacotin's Map of Palestine" (PDF). Israel Exploration Journal. 10 (3, 4): 155–173, 244–253. Archived from the original (PDF) on 2019-12-22.
- Palmer, E.H. (1881). The Survey of Western Palestine: Arabic and English Name Lists Collected During the Survey by Lieutenants Conder and Kitchener, R. E. Transliterated and Explained by E.H. Palmer. Committee of the Palestine Exploration Fund. ("personal name" p. 115)
- Robinson, E.; Smith, E. (1841). Biblical Researches in Palestine, Mount Sinai and Arabia Petraea: A Journal of Travels in the year 1838. Vol. 3. Boston: Crocker & Brewster.
- Robinson, E.; Smith, E. (1856). Later Biblical Researches in Palestine and adjacent regions: A Journal of Travels in the year 1852. London: John Murray.
- Schumacher, G. (1888). "Population list of the Liwa of Akka". Quarterly Statement - Palestine Exploration Fund. 20: 169–191.
- Schumacher, G. (1900). "Reports from Galilee". Quarterly Statement - Palestine Exploration Fund. 32 (4): 355–360. doi:10.1179/peq.1900.32.4.355.
- Rainey, Anson F. "Reviewed Work: Tabula imperii romani: Iudaea-Palaestina, Eretz Israel in the Hellenistic, Roman, and Byzantine Periods by Y. Tsafrir, L. Di Segni, J. Green". Journal of the American Oriental Society. JSTOR 606301.
- Flavius, Josephus. "Josephi Vita".
- "Shimron". Bible Encyclopedia.
- Master, Daniel & Martin, Mario A.S. (2021). "Tel Shimron – 2017, 2019". Hadashot Arkheologiyot. 133.
- Portugali, Yuval. "A Field Methodology for Regional Archaeology (The Jezreel Valley Survey, 1981)". Tel Aviv: 170–188.
- Alexandre, Yardenna. "Tel Shimron West: A Proto-Historic and Bronze Age Rural Site". Hadashot Arkheologiyot Excavations and Surveys in Israel. 127: 1–27 – via Hadashot Arkheologiyot.
- Roßberger, Elisa. "A Middle Bronze II Cylinder Seal of North Syrian Style from Tel Shimron (Jezreel Valley)". U Chicago.
- "Simonias". Jewish Encyclopedia.
