= Sha'ar HaAmakim =

Kibbutz in northern Israel

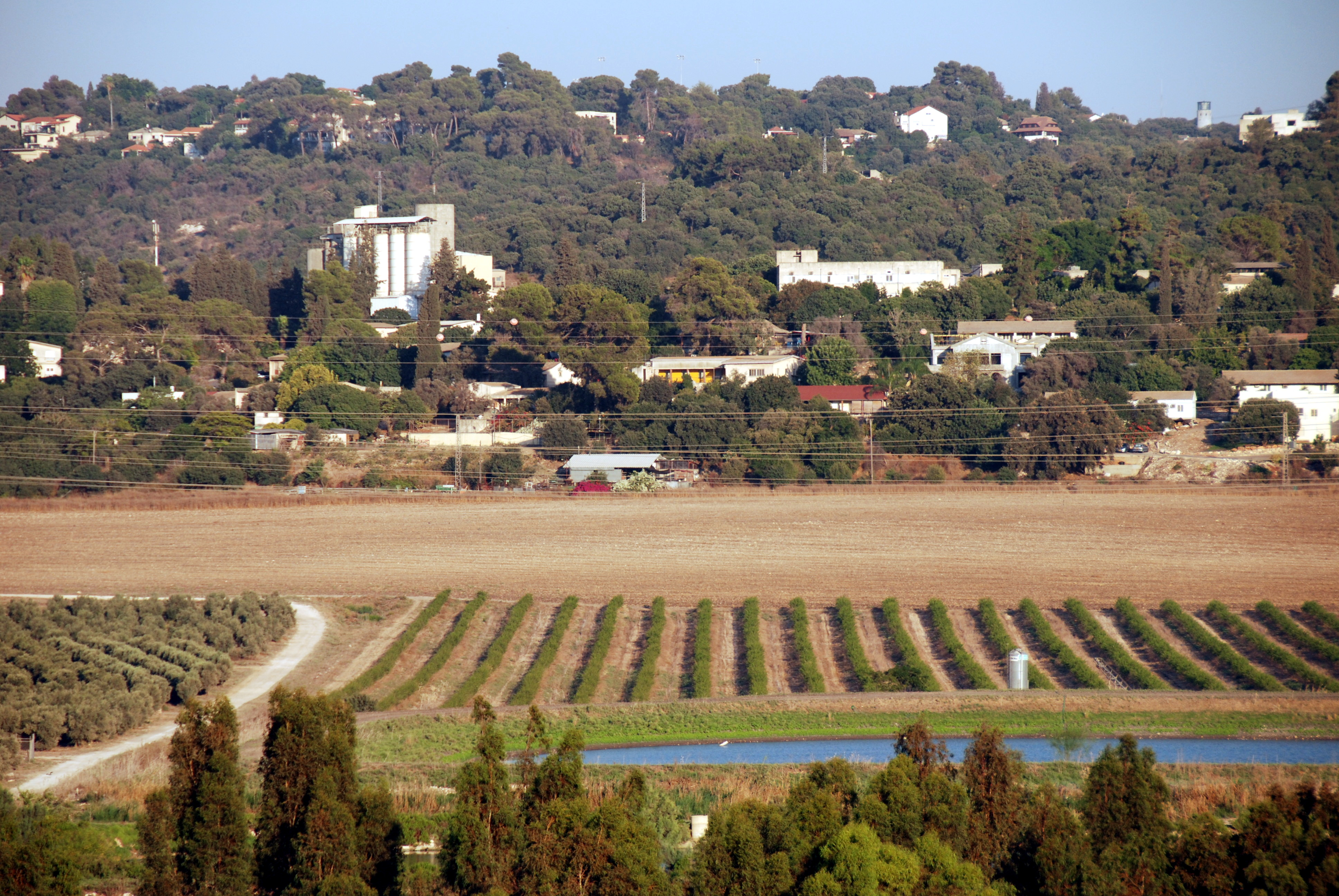
- Sha'ar HaAmakim in 2008

- Location within Haifa region of Israel
- Coordinates: 32°43′23″N 35°6′48″E
- Grid position: 160/236 PAL
- Country: Israel
- District: Haifa
- Subdistrict: Haifa
- Council: Zevulun
- Affiliation: Kibbutz Movement
- Founded: 1935
- Founder: Romanian and Yugoslav Jews
- Population (2024): 832
- Website: www.s-h.org.il

Sha'ar HaAmakim (Hebrew: שַׁעַר הַעֲמָקִים, lit. 'Gate of the Valleys') is a kibbutz in northern Israel associated with the Hashomer Hatzair movement founded in 1935. Located near Kiryat Tiv'on, it falls under the jurisdiction of Zevulun Regional Council. In 2024 it had a population of 832.

== History ==
=== Antiquity ===
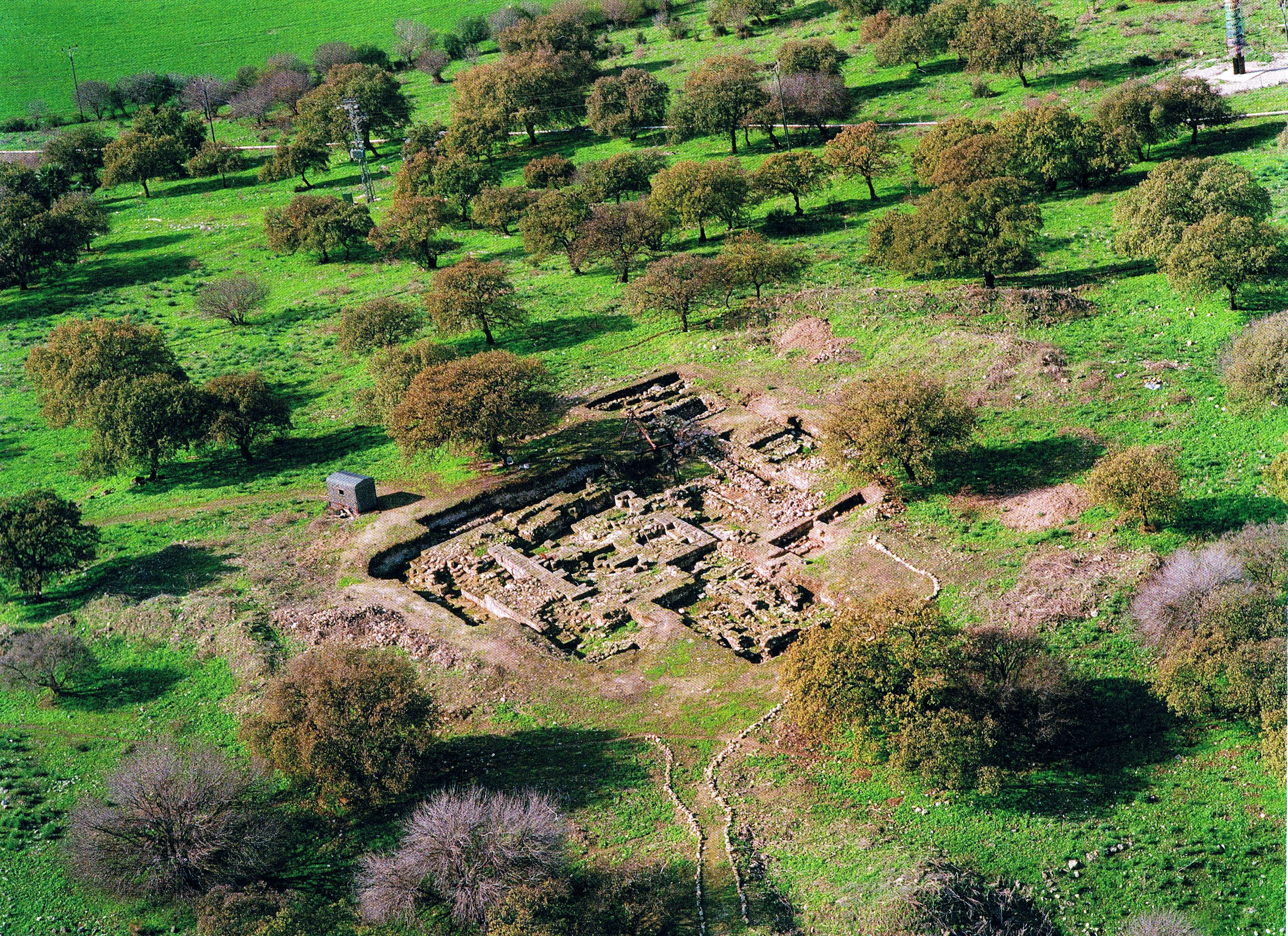
Hellenistic era site near the kibbutz

Human habitation in the area dates at least as far back as the Hellenistic period. Although the site, in recent history, has borne the name of Ḫirbet el-Ḥârithîye, it is thought by modern-day archaeologists to have been the Second Temple-period site known as Geba / Gibea (Greek: Γάβα), based on Josephus' description of distances between Geba and Simonias and Beit She'arim (Roman-era Jewish village) in Lower Galilee.

=== Crusades ===
In 1283, during the hudna ("truce") between the Crusaders based in Acre and the Mamluk sultan al-Mansur Qalawun, this location was named el Harathiyah and was described as part of the domain of the Crusaders.

=== Ottoman rule ===
During the Ottoman era, a Muslim village at the site was named el Hâritheh. The village appeared as El Harti on the map of Pierre Jacotin compiled in 1799. In 1859, the population was recorded as 120 with tillable land of 12 feddans. In 1875, Victor Guérin reported about 40 houses. In 1882, the Palestine Exploration Fund's Survey of Western Palestine described it as an adobe hamlet.

A population list from about 1887 showed that Harithiyeh had about 120 inhabitants; all Muslims.

=== British Mandate ===
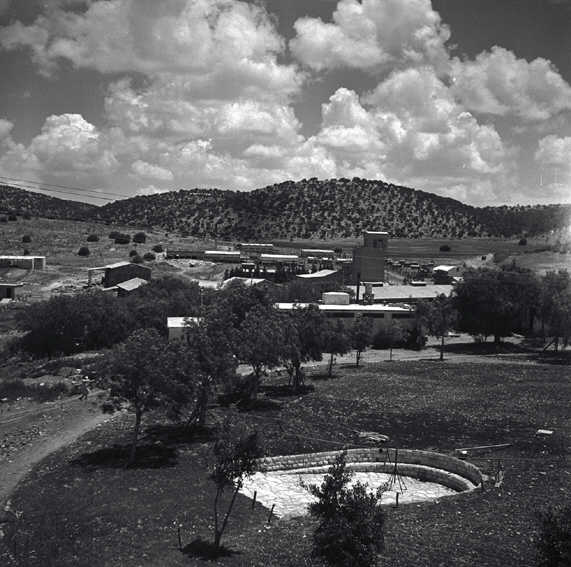
Sha’ar HaAmakim 1947

In the 1922 census of Palestine, conducted by the British Mandate authorities, the Al Zubaidat, who cultivated the Hartieh land, numbered 363, all Muslims.

The area was acquired by the Jewish community as part of the Sursock Purchase. In 1925 a Zionist organisation purchased 50 feddans in Hartieh from the Sursock family of Beirut. At the time, there were 60 families living there. In the 1931 census, the Arab Zubeidat was counted under the Shefa-'Amr suburbs.

From 1931, and lasting several years, the Jewish Agency struggled to evict the Arab El Zubeidat, who were tenant farmers at Hartiya. According to Avneri, Hartiya land was to become Sha'ar HaAmakim. According to the Department of Statistics, however, Sha'ar HaAmakim had previously been part of Sheikh Bureik.

Kibbutz Sha'ar HaAmakim was founded in 1935 by immigrants from Romania and Yugoslavia. One of its founders was Aharon Cohen, later to be convicted of spying for the Soviet Union. Its name was derived from the nearby confluence of the Jezreel and Zevulun valleys. By the 1945 statistics it had a population of 360, all Jews.

=== State of Israel ===
Sha'ar HaAmakim hosted volunteers from around the world, including France and the United States, who worked at the kibbutz and participated in cultural exchanges. In the 1960s, there were up to 100 volunteers each year. Bernie Sanders spent time at the kibbutz for several months in 1963.

== Economy ==
According to a 2016 report, the kibbutz derives most of its income from its solar water heater factory. Additional sources of income include agriculture, such as dairy farming. For over five decades, the kibbutz has produced and processed sunflower seeds which it markets under its name both in Israel and for export. It also has a fish pond and orchards producing apples, peaches, and pears.

== Bibliography ==
- Avneri, Arieh L. (1984). The Claim of Dispossession: Jewish Land-settlement and the Arabs, 1878-1948. Transaction Publishers. ISBN 0-87855-964-7.
- Barag, Dan (1979). "A new source concerning the ultimate borders of the Latin Kingdom of Jerusalem". Israel Exploration Journal. 29: 197–217.
- Barron, J.B., ed. (1923). Palestine: Report and General Abstracts of the Census of 1922. Government of Palestine.
- Conder, C.R.; Kitchener, H.H. (1881). The Survey of Western Palestine: Memoirs of the Topography, Orography, Hydrography, and Archaeology. Vol. 1. London: Committee of the Palestine Exploration Fund.
- Dvorjetski, Esti (2009), "Between the Valley of Zebulun and the Valley of Jezreel: the Historical Geography of Geva-Geba-Gaba-Jaba'", Excavations of the Hellenistic site in Kibbutz Sha'ar-Ha'Amakim (Gaba) 1984-1998, Haifa: Zinman Institute of Archaeology: University of Haifa
- Government of Palestine, Department of Statistics (1945). Village Statistics, April, 1945.
- Guérin, V. (1880). Description Géographique Historique et Archéologique de la Palestine (in French). Vol. 3: Galilee, pt. 1. Paris: L'Imprimerie Nationale.
- Hadawi, S. (1970). Village Statistics of 1945: A Classification of Land and Area ownership in Palestine. Palestine Liberation Organization Research Center.
- Karmon, Y. (1960). "An Analysis of Jacotin's Map of Palestine" (PDF). Israel Exploration Journal. 10 (3, 4): 155–173, 244–253. Archived from the original (PDF) on 28 September 2018.
- Mazar (Maisler), B. (1957). Beth She'arim - Report on the Excavations during 1936–40 (in Hebrew). Vol. 1 (The Catacombs I–IV). Jerusalem: Israel Exploration Society. OCLC 492594574. (reprinted from 1944 edition)
- Mills, E., ed. (1932). Census of Palestine 1931. Population of Villages, Towns and Administrative Areas. Jerusalem: Government of Palestine.
- Palmer, E.H. (1881). The Survey of Western Palestine: Arabic and English Name Lists Collected During the Survey by Lieutenants Conder and Kitchener, R. E. Transliterated and Explained by E.H. Palmer. Committee of the Palestine Exploration Fund.
- Schumacher, G. (1888). "Population list of the Liwa of Akka". Quarterly Statement - Palestine Exploration Fund. 20: 169–191.
