= Ramat Yishai =

Town in northern Israel

Ramat Yishai: רָמַת יִשַּׁי; رمات يشاي
- Local council (from 1958)

Hebrew transcription(s)
  - ISO 259: Ramat Yiššay
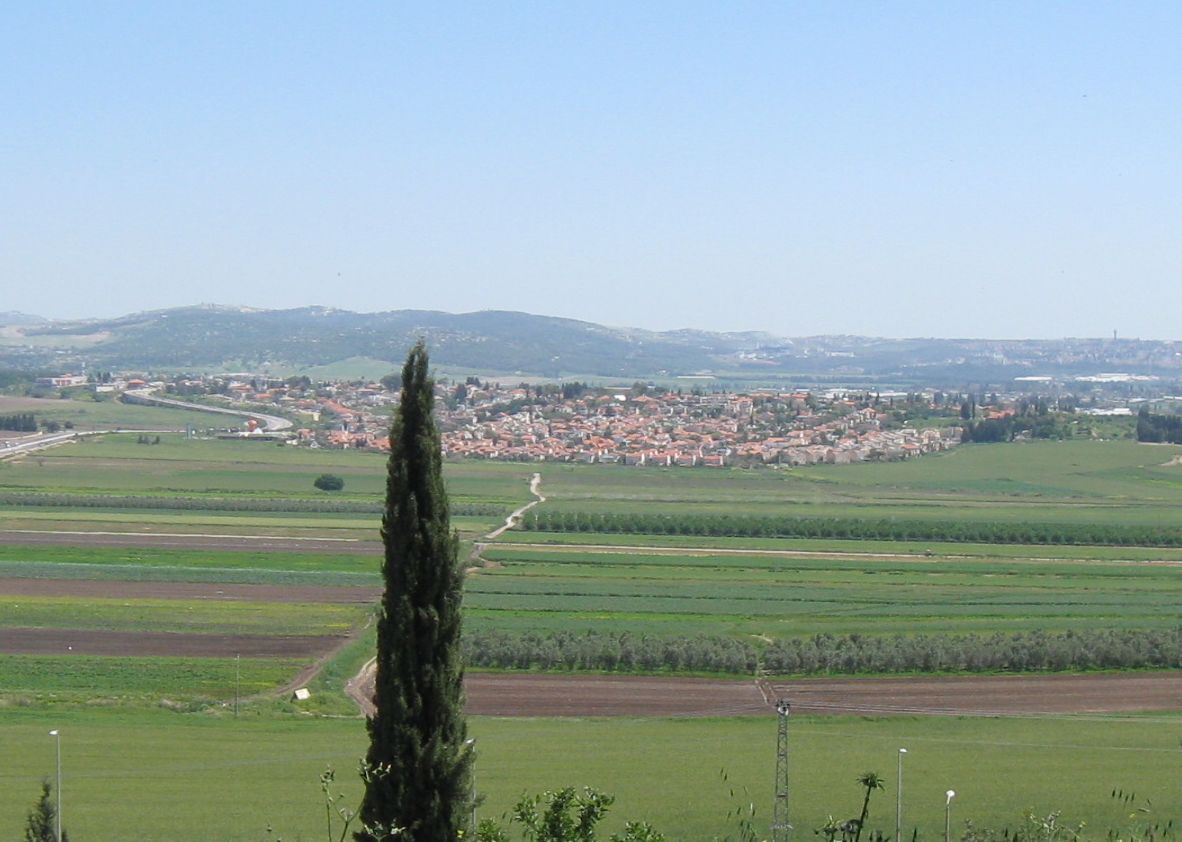
- View of Ramat Yishai from the west

- Location within Haifa region of Israel
- Coordinates: 32°42′12″N 35°9′54″E
- Grid position: 166/234 PAL
- Country: Israel
- District: Northern
- Subdistrict: Jezreel
- Natural Region: Yokneam
- Founded: 1925

Government
  - Head of Municipality: Assaf Oberlander

Area
  - Total: 2,388 dunams (2.388 km^{2}; 0.922 sq mi)

Population (2024)
  - Total: 7,953
  - Density: 3,330/km^{2} (8,626/sq mi)

Ethnicity
  - Jews and others: 99.9%
  - Arabs: 0.1%

Ramat Yishai (Hebrew: רָמַת יִשַּׁי, Jesse's Heights; Arabic: رمات يشاي) is a town in the Northern District of Israel, located on the side of the Haifa–Nazareth road about 4 kilometres (2.5 mi) eastern to Kiryat Tivon. It was originally established as Manor in 1925 on land purchased from the Arab village of Jeida. The town achieved local council status in 1958. In 2024 it had a population of 7,953.

== Name ==
The town is named for the Jewish teacher and philanthropist Yisrael Yehudah "Yishai" Adler, who was among the founders of Tel Aviv, and who in 1943 donated funds that were crucial to the town's survival after it was attacked by Arab raiders during the 1936–39 Arab revolt in Palestine. This name replaced the official Arabic name Jeida in 1943. Prior to that it was also colloquially called ‘’Manor’’.

== History ==
Archaeological remnants have been found from Middle Bronze Age I (a tomb) and the Roman, Byzantine, Umayyad and Abbasid eras. Of particular interest, was a zoomorphic vessel of glass, dating to the Umayyad era. Remains from the Crusades, as well as from the Mamluk era has also been found here.

In 1875 Victor Guérin found rock-cut cisterns in the area that have been repeatedly dug up, concluding that the examined archeological site must be an ancient one. Guérin identified the site with the ancient Israelite city of Idalah, a part of the inheritance of the Tribe of Zebulon.

=== Ottoman era ===
During the Ottoman era, an Arab village existed on the lands where Ramat Yishai is currently located. the village's name was Jeida (sometimes spelled in English as Jayda, Geida or Jedda) which possibly meant "long-necked" in Arabic as a description of a previous inhabitant of the village or land, or an Arabicization of the Hebrew name Idalah.

Jeida was first mentioned in the Ottoman defter for the year 1555–6, named Jayda, located in the Nahiya of Tabariyya of the Liwa of Safad, and with its land designated as Ziamet land. The village appeared as Geida on the map which Pierre Jacotin compiled in 1799. In 1881, the PEF's Survey of Western Palestine (SWP) found that the village was much like the nearby village Al-Harithiyah, described as "A miserable hamlet of mud". A spring was mentioned to be 3/4 of a mile to the west.

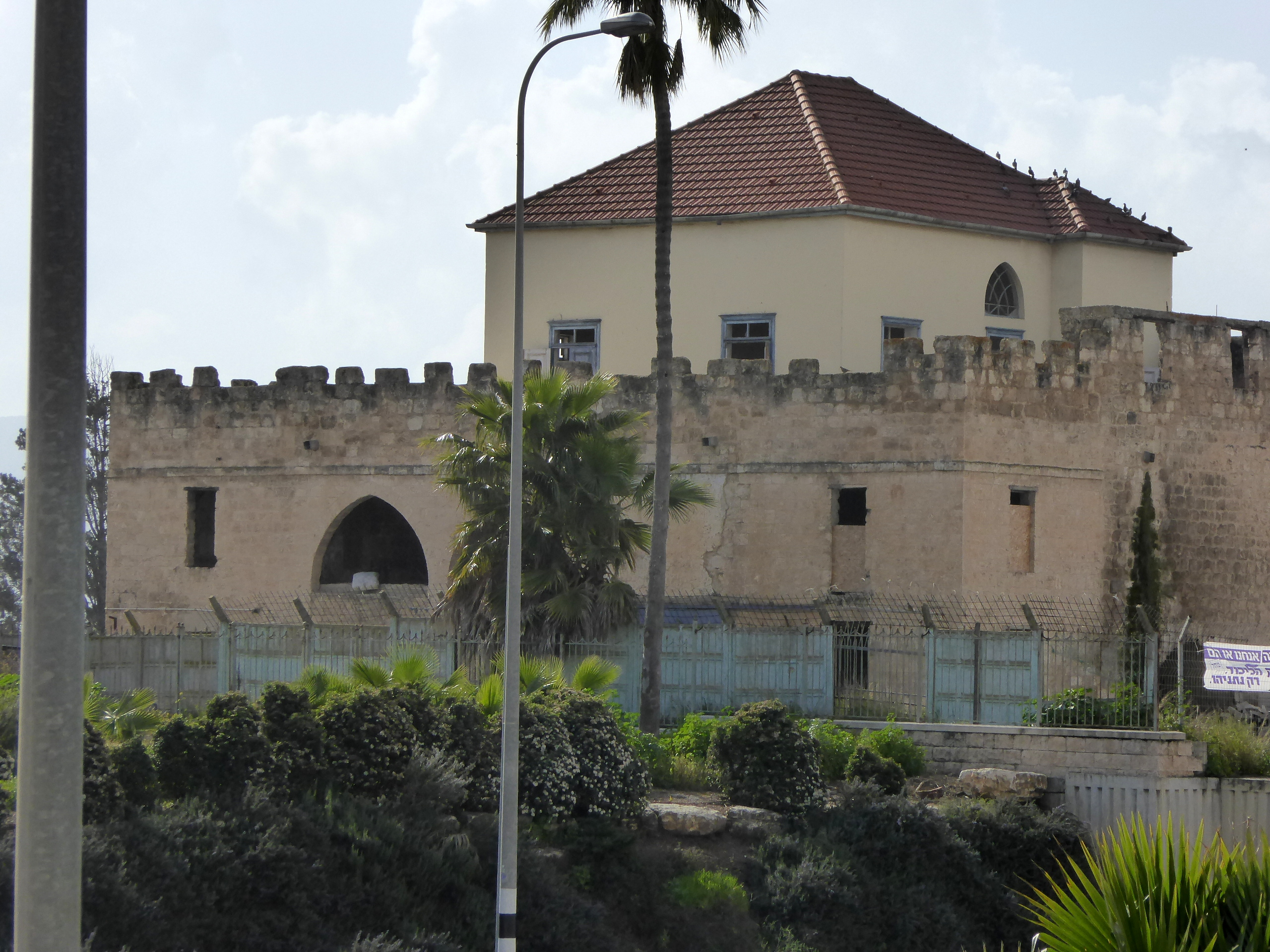
2015 picture of the Ramat Yishai Khan

Around the late 19th century, the lands of the Jezreel Valley, including the village, were purchased from the Ottoman Empire by members of the Lebanese Greek Orthodox Christian Tueni family, which later partnered with the Sursuk family from Beirut to manage the land. The landowners either financed the construction or the renovation of the Ramat Yishai Khan, after which it was used as the residence of the foreman who oversaw farmhands working their lands. The building was colloquially identified as a Persian Khan, a travelers' inn.

=== British Mandate era ===
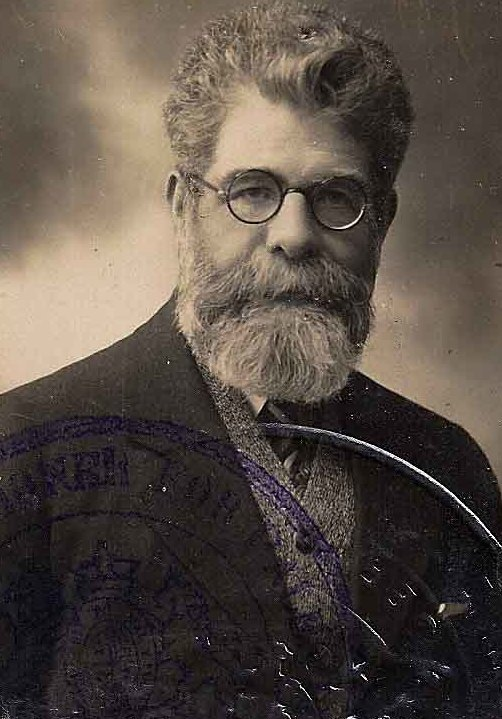
1929 passport photo of Yishai Adler, who Ramat Yishai was named after

In 1925, the Tueni and Sursuk families sold the lands, a total of 15,000 dunams, to the Zion Society of America, a private Zionist organization. The lands were sold to the Manor Company, a cooperative of Polish Jewish weavers from Łódź that immigrated to Palestine. Manor was also to be the name of the planned socialist textile factory town, similar to the New Lanark project in Scotland. The hope was to create a European-scaled textile center similar to the Jewish textile industry in Poland at the time, and was deemed to be a model project of industrial settlement in Palestine. Haim Weizman deemed Manor to be "one of the most important projects in Palestine".

The British government established a Police post in the village, as early as 1930.

The Manor Company established a textile mill in Manor, the first of its kind in Mandatory Palestine, and additional 18 shacks used as housing for the mill's workers, a shared kitchen, a school, and a cow shed. five shallow wells were dug to provide drinking water for the 251 factory workers that moved to Manor by 1926. The mill was initially unsuccessful. by 1928 the mill's assets were sold by auction, and only 22 families remained in the village, subsisting mostly from grain agriculture, with a fludgling milking industry.

In June 1931 the remaining assets of the textile mill were bought by the Nul company. Nul partnered with the Tel-Aviv Based Gerev company to reestablish the mill, to moderate initial success. The mill is credited as instrumental in the development of industry in Mandatory Palestine, particularly in the training of technical and industrial experts that went on to found, operate and manage factories throughout Israel.

in 1933, some of the lands owned by the village were expropriated by the government for the construction of the Kirkuk–Haifa oil pipeline.

During the Arab Revolt the isolated Jewish population in Manor and the surrounding area was subject to constant attacks, sniper fire and ambushes from armed militias of local Arabs. On 12 October 1936 the villager Mordechai Feldman was ambushed and killed. On the night of 5 June 1938, armed Arabs attacked the Jews in the village again, killed one of the volunteer notrim, Zvi Levine, wounded another, and burned down the textile mill and other buildings. Due to the attacks, Manor was almost abandoned, with the 9 remaining families abandoning their homes to seek shelter in the Khan, and petitioned Zionist organizations to provide relief. The textile mill was liquidated in 1937.

In 1943, one of Tel Aviv's founders, the Jewish philanthropist Yisrael Yehudah "Yishai" Adler pledged a donation of 10,000 Pounds to construct permanent homes for the textile mill workers and public buildings in Manor. The village was renamed in his honour shortly thereafter. Construction began on January 25, 1944. A synogauge and clinic were built in 1947.

=== State of Israel ===
by 1949, the village grew to a total of 45 families, mostly employed by the textile mill. in 1950 a 200-family Ma'abara, a refugee tent city, was created by the state nearby. At that time that more than doubled the population of the town. Three years later the tent city was demolished as the refugees were resettled in Migdal Haemek.

the 1950s were met by an economic and population expansion. the town grew to more than 200 families, and several new industries were established, including a cooperative bakery and the Newe Ya’ar Agricultural Research Center. in an effort to attract private industrial entrepreneurs, the town dedicated a designated industrial zone north of the town. The town was also first connected to the national electric and water grids. However, the local textile mill, while operating so far, remained unseccessful and ultimetly defuncted in 1959, leaving two thirds of the town unemployed.

Since the 1990s, Ramat Yishai has undergone rapid development. In 2010, the population was estimated at close to 7,000 people, with 1,800 households at the high end of the socioeconomic scale.

== Local government and politics ==
the town was originally part of the Kishon Regional Council. The regional council mostly governed agricultural settlements, like the surrounding Kibbutzim and Moshavim, and the industrial Ramat Yishai was an outlier. The town claimed it was substantially underfunded and underrepresented, and began demanding its independence in the 1950s. Additionally, a desire to double the size of the town in the following years required additional local authorities. In 1958, during its 32 anniversary celebrations, the town was elevated to local council status.

The first mayor, Amnon Yanai, was elected on behalf of the local branch of Mapai, the ruling political party in Israel at the time. The mayor was ousted in 1962 due to the council's failure to fulfil its stated goal to double the population of the town. The Ministry of the Interior appointed an interim council and mayor, the local nurse Yehudith Shoshani, also from Mapai. Shoshani was the first female mayor in Israel. Yanai's brother and former Mapai member, Oded Yanai, founded an opposition party name Le'Maan Ramat Yishai (For Ramat Yishai) which managed to form a coalition after the 1965 elections. During 1967 Yanai had a change of heart, rejoined Mapai, resigned as mayor, and designated Shoshani as the interim mayor for a second time. in the 1969 elections Mapai, headed by Shoshani, managed to form a coalition government with Le'Maan Ramat Yishai. This made Shoshani the first elected female mayor in Israel. The political drama continued as a year following the elections both council members from Mapai, now the Israeli Labor Party, resigned due to "personal reasons". The national and local opposition party Gahal formed a coalition and named Zelda Kramer, also a female nurse, as the new mayor. Shoshani was reelected in 1967, defeating Kramer by 2 votes. Shoshani ultimately resigned on September 2, 1976, and was replaced by her party member, Moshe Zeidner.

=== Mayors ===
Below is a list of mayors since the town became a local council:

Mayors of Ramat Yishai
Mayor		Party	Took office	Left office
1	Amnon Yanai	Mapai	December 1959	November 1962
2	Yehudith Shoshani	Mapai	November 1962	November 1965
3	Oded Yanai	Le'Maan Ramat Yishai	November 1965	1967
4	Yehudith Shoshani	Mapai	1967	1970
5	Zelda Kramer	Gahal	1970	January 1974
6	Yehudith Shoshani	Labor	January 1974	September 2, 1976
7	Moshe Zeidner	Labor	September 2, 1976	October 1978
8	Dror Vogel	Likud	October 1978	November 1993
9	Zeev Schwartz		November 1993	November 1998
10	Nir Havkin	Likud	November 1998	November 2008
11	Ofer Ben Eliezer	Rama (Yesh Atid affiliated)	November 2008	March 2024
12	Assaf Oberlander	Toshavim Ve'Totzaot	March 2024	Present

Before 1959, the local government was headed by a Mukhtar.

== Voting Patterns ==
In the 2022 election, 65 percent of voters in Ramat Yishai voted for the parties of the center-left coalition led by Yair Lapid, while 32 percent voted for the parties of the right-wing coalition led by Benjamin Netanyahu and 0.1 percent voted for the Arab parties.

In the 2026 election, 66 percent of voters in Ramat Yishai voted for the parties of the center-left coalition led by Gadi Eisenkot, while 28 percent voted for the parties of the right-wing coalition led by Benjamin Netanyahu and 0.2 percent voted for the Arab parties. An additional 3.9 percent voted for the Reservists, and 1.9 percent voted for Amcha Yisrael. Voter turnout increased 16 percent from the 2022 election.

== Culture and landmarks ==
One of the better known buildings in the village is called "the Khan" (caravanserai in Arabic), a 1909 building with surrounding walls. The logo of the village consists of this Ottoman-era building with a palm tree next to it. The town hall flies 2 logo-on-bedsheet flags with this emblem in dark blue on a light blue and a yellow field, respectively.

== Demographics ==
Historical population
Year	Pop.	±%
1931	115	—
1937	78	−32.2%
1945	50	−35.9%
1961	779	+1458.0%
1965	765	−1.8%
1969	790	+3.3%
1972	800	+1.3%
1983	1,300	+62.5%
1995	3,700	+184.6%
2008	6,200	+67.6%
2022	7,880	+27.1%
2024	7,953	+0.9%

In 1859, the village of Jeida was estimated to have 120 inhabitants, and the tillage was 20 feddans (about 84 dunams). A population list from about 1887 showed that Jeida had about 140 inhabitants; all Muslims. In the 1922 census of Palestine conducted by the British Mandate authorities, Jaida had a total population of 327; 324 Muslims and 3 Christians; of which two were Roman Catholics and one was Melkite Catholic.

A 1926 newspaper report claimed that a total of 251 Jews inhabited the land. At the time of the 1931 census, Jaida had 29 occupied houses and a population of 77 Jews, 2 Christians, and 33 Muslims; a total of 115. In mid-1937, the overall estimated population of 78 included 43 non-Jews and 35 Jews. In the 1945 statistics, Ramat Yishai had 50 residents, all Jewish. It was noted that it was previously called Jeida.

in the 2010s Ramat Yishai experienced a minor population boom, driven by families moving from larger cities, motivated by the improving transportation infrastructure in the region. In 2022, 97.2% of the population was Jewish and 2.8% was counted as other.

== See also ==
- List of people from Ramat Yishai

== Bibliography ==
- Atrash, Walid; Hanna, Butros (2016-04-17). "Ramat Yishay" (128). Hadashot Arkheologiyot – Excavations and Surveys in Israel.
- Barron, J.B., ed. (1923). Palestine: Report and General Abstracts of the Census of 1922. Government of Palestine.
- Bisharat, Eyad (2016-03-07). "Ramat Yishay" (128). Hadashot Arkheologiyot – Excavations and Surveys in Israel.
- Conder, C.R.; Kitchener, H.H. (1881). The Survey of Western Palestine: Memoirs of the Topography, Orography, Hydrography, and Archaeology. Vol. 1. London: Committee of the Palestine Exploration Fund.
- Daniel, Zohar (2010-06-18). "Ramat Yishay" (122). Hadashot Arkheologiyot – Excavations and Surveys in Israel.
- Government of Palestine, Department of Statistics (1945). Village Statistics, April, 1945.
- Guérin, V. (1880). Description Géographique Historique et Archéologique de la Palestine (in French). Vol. 3: Galilee, pt. 1. Paris: L'Imprimerie Nationale.
- Hadawi, S. (1970). Village Statistics of 1945: A Classification of Land and Area ownership in Palestine. Palestine Liberation Organization Research Centre.
- Hanna, Butros (2010-06-18). "Ramat Yishay (South)" (122). Hadashot Arkheologiyot – Excavations and Surveys in Israel.
- Hanna, Butros (2012-10-31). "Ramat Yishay (A)" (124). Hadashot Arkheologiyot – Excavations and Surveys in Israel.
- Hanna, Butros (2012-10-31). "Ramat Yishay (B)" (124). Hadashot Arkheologiyot – Excavations and Surveys in Israel.
- Hanna, Butros (2013-08-26). "Ramat Yishay, Ha-Oren St. (A)" (125). Hadashot Arkheologiyot – Excavations and Surveys in Israel.
- Karmon, Y. (1960). "An Analysis of Jacotin's Map of Palestine" (PDF). Israel Exploration Journal. 10 (3, 4): 155–173, 244–253. Archived from the original (PDF) on 2019-12-22.
- Mills, E., ed. (1932). Census of Palestine 1931. Population of Villages, Towns and Administrative Areas. Jerusalem: Government of Palestine.
- Palmer, E.H. (1881). The Survey of Western Palestine: Arabic and English Name Lists Collected During the Survey by Lieutenants Conder and Kitchener, R. E. Transliterated and Explained by E.H. Palmer. Committee of the Palestine Exploration Fund.
- Porat, Leea (2005-11-13). "Ramat Yishay" (117). Hadashot Arkheologiyot – Excavations and Surveys in Israel.
- Porat, Leea (2007-02-06). "Ramat Yishay" (119). Hadashot Arkheologiyot – Excavations and Surveys in Israel.
- Rhode, H. (1979). Administration and Population of the Sancak of Safed in the Sixteenth Century. Columbia University. Archived from the original on 2020-03-01.
- Schumacher, G. (1888). "Population list of the Liwa of Akka". Quarterly Statement - Palestine Exploration Fund. 20: 169–191.
- Tepper, Y. (2016-04-14). "Ramat Yishay" (128). Hadashot Arkheologiyot – Excavations and Surveys in Israel.
