= Leggio =

Leggio is an Italian surname and may refer to:

- Luciano Leggio (1925–1993), Italian mobster
- David Leggio (born 1984), American ice hockey player
- Jerry Leggio (1935–2025), American actor
- Carmen Leggio (c. 1927–2009), American jazz tenor saxophonist
