= Shimon Gibson =

British archeologist

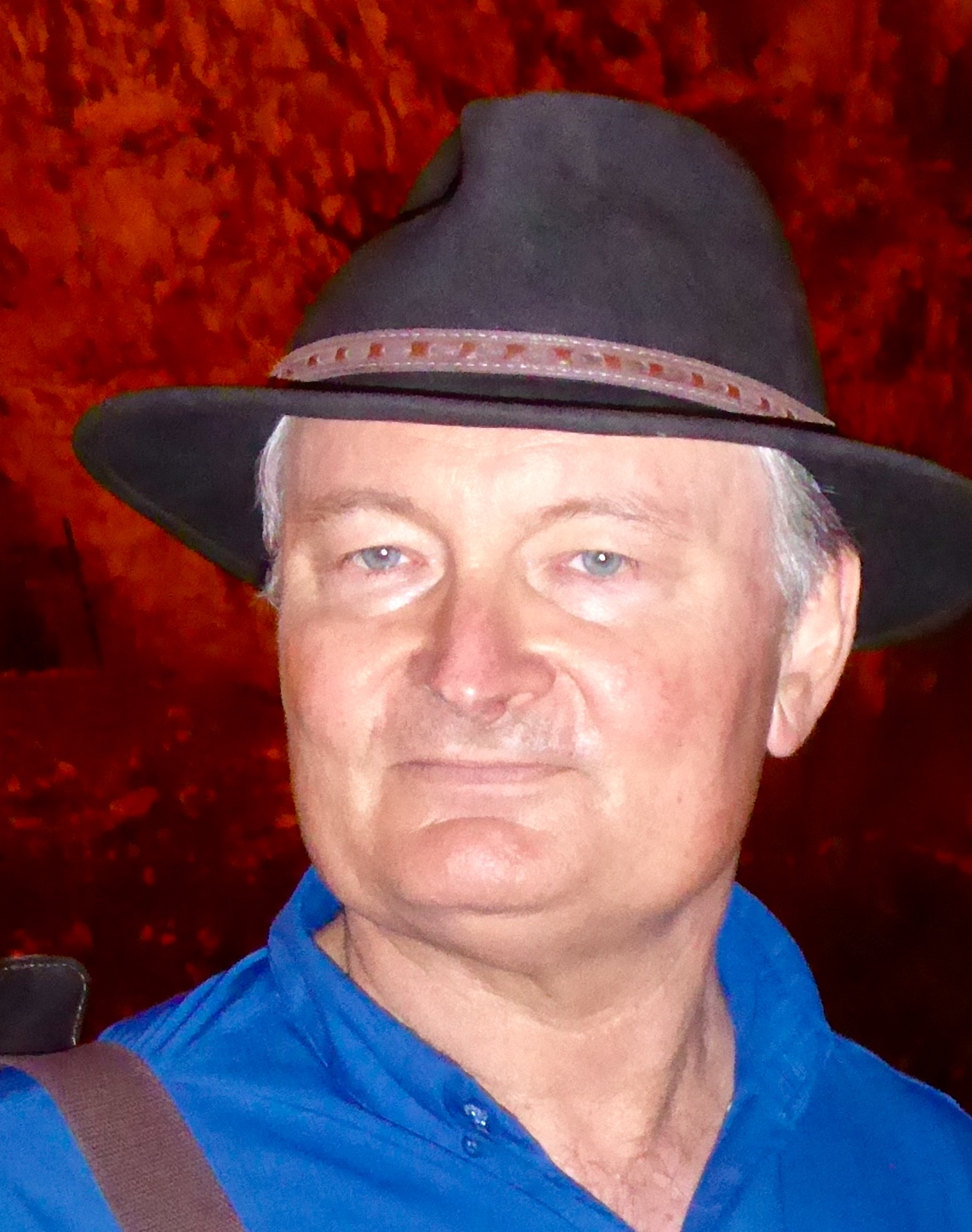
Shimon Gibson is an archaeologist and a professor of practice in the Department of History at the University of North Carolina, Charlotte.

Shimon Gibson is a British-born archaeologist living in North Carolina, where he is a professor of practice in the Department of History at University of North Carolina at Charlotte.

== Life ==
Gibson was the lead archaeologist excavating a wilderness cave he associated with John the Baptist in 2000 and later wrote The Cave of John the Baptist. Such claim has been criticized by other scholars and, according to Hershel Shanks, "few, if any, scholars in Israel think this cave has anything to do with John the Baptist". He later led a team that found a 10-line ritual cup at Mount Zion.

He is the editor of The Illustrated Dictionary & Concordance of the Bible and was co-editor with Avraham Negev of the Archaeological Encyclopedia of the Holy Land. In his The Final Days of Jesus: The Archaeological Evidence (2009) he advanced the theory that Jesus was killed for acts of healing.

Gibson has appeared in a number of biblical archaeology documentaries.
