= The Life of Flavius Josephus =

Autobiography of Flavius Josephus

- Author: Josephus
- Original title: Ἰωσήπου βίος Iosepou bios
- Language: Greek
- Genre: Autobiography
- Publication date: 94-99 CE

The Life of (Flavius) Josephus (Greek: Ἰωσήπου βίος Iosepou bios), also called the "Life of Flavius Josephus", or simply Life or Vita, is an autobiographical text written by Josephus in approximately 94-99 CE as an appendix to his Antiquities of the Jews (cf. Antiquities of the Jews 20.260-268 and Life 430), where the author for the most part revisits the events of the First Jewish-Roman War. Life is also a response to allegations made against Josephus by Justus of Tiberias (cf. Life 336). Nothing survives of Justus of Tiberius's works except what is mentioned by Josephus in Life.

The Life of Josephus is the earliest complete autobiography that has survived intact from the ancient world. Most of the work (28-413) focuses on the activities of Josephus as a general in Galilee, where Jesus of Nazareth ministered, around the mid 60s AD during the first Jewish revolt against Rome. He discusses demographics of the inhabitants of Galilee, economics, cultural patterns, and government.

Josephus states he is descended from a priestly family and is related to Hasmonenan dynasty. At around 26 years old, Josephus traveled to Rome to negotiate the release of Jewish priests imprisoned there by Nero. With the assistance of Nero's wife, Poppaea, and a Jewish actor, he succeeded in securing their freedom. Upon his return to Jerusalem, at the outbreak of the First Jewish–Roman War, Josephus was appointed the military governor of Galilee. His arrival in Galilee, however, was fraught with internal division: the inhabitants of Sepphoris and Tiberias opted to maintain peace with the Romans; the people of Sepphoris enlisted the help of the Roman army to protect their city, while the people of Tiberias appealed to King Agrippa's forces to protect them from the insurgents. Josephus trained 65,000-100,000 troops in the region.

== Composition ==
Scholars have discussed the possible reasons that Josephus would have had to even write an autobiography in the first place. Some has suggested that since Justus of Tiberias made allegations against Josephus, that this was, in part, a response to him. Others have suggested that it was his effort, as a survivor of the War, to explain to the Judean diaspora why he failed "to master the Galilee" and why he was rejected by the authorities. Others have suggested that he was trying to establish his qualifications since he was writing about the War or was practicing common trends of great men to write in praise and defense of their character.

=== As an appendix to Antiquities of the Jews ===
In the end of Antiquities of the Jews, Josephus makes a reference that his autobiography (Life) was supposed to be at the end of that work. He states:

Encouraged by the completion of what I had projected, I would now say plainly that no other person who had wished to do so, whether a Judean or a foreigner, would have been able to produce this work in such a precise way for Greek speakers.For among my compatriots I am admitted to have an education in our country’s customs that far surpasses theirs, and I worked very hard to share in the learning of Greek letters and poetry... Perhaps it will not be a provocation to jealousy, or strike ordinary folk as gauche, if I review briefly both my own ancestry (genos) and the events of my life while there are still those living who can either challenge or corroborate. With these matters I shall conclude the Judean Antiquities (Epi toutois de katapausô tên archaiologian), comprising twenty volumes and 60,000 lines, and should the Deity permit I shall again make mention cursorily (kata peridromên hypomnêsô palin) of both the war and what has happened to us until the present day, which belongs to the thirteenth year of the rule of Domitian Caesar and my own fifty‐sixth year since birth. I have also resolved to write in four volumes about our Judean views concerning God...

— Antiquities of the Jews 20.260-268

At the end of Life, Josephus makes reference once more that his autobiography is the last part of Antiquities of the Jews. He states:

And this is the account of the actions of my whole life; and let others judge of my character by them as they please; but to thee, O Epaphroditus, thou most excellent of men! do I dedicate all this treatise of our Antiquities; and so, for the present, I here conclude the whole.

— Life 430

==== Internal and external evidence ====
There are numerous internal and external evidences that also signify that Life was supposed to be at the end of Antiquities of the Jews. For example, ancient writers like Eusebius, who were familiar with his works, did not treat Life as a separate work when quoting a passage from it and all manuscripts of Antiquities of the Jews include Life with books 11-20. Also style, phrases, references to people from Antiquities of the Jews continue into Life.

== Contents ==
Life of Josephus (Greek: Ἰωσήπου βίος)
Overview	Section
Ancestry, education, and juvenile honors	1–12
Qualification for leadership: embassy to Rome, being shipwrecked, surviving, meeting Poppaea and able to liberate captive priests	13–16
Judean desire for revolt against Rome, the suffering of Judeans	16-27
Mission in Galilee and conflicts faced as a general	30-188
Delegation from Jerusalem sent to replace Josephus	189–335
Digression against Justus of Tiberias (who wrote against Josephus)	335–367
Josephus’s successes and opponents’ failures in war, losing to Vespasian	368–413
Josephus in Roman captivity, Josephus in Alexandria	414–415
Josephus taken by Titus to Jerusalem, witnesses the fall of Jerusalem, Titus protects and grants favors to Josephus	416–421
Josephus is given benefits from Flavian rulers, given Roman citizenship and property	422–429
Josephus states this is the conclusion of Antiquities of the Jews	430

== Bibliography ==
- Mason, Steve (2016). "Josephus's Autobiography (Life of Josephus)". In Rodgers, Zuleika; Chapman, Honora (eds.). A Companion to Josephus. John Wiley & Sons, Inc. pp. 59–74. ISBN 978-1-118-32516-2.
- Stern, Pnina (2010). "Life of Josephus: The Autobiography of Flavius Josephus". Journal for the Study of Judaism. 41 (1): 63–93. doi:10.1163/004722110X12580045809786.
- Willem van Henten, Jan (2022). "Josephus". In Kaizer, Ted (ed.). A Companion to the Hellenistic and Roman Near East. John Wiley & Sons, Inc. pp. 67–76. ISBN 9781444339826.

== Editions ==
- William Whiston, The whole genuine works of Flavius Josephus, Vol. 3, Blackie, 1859, p. 192f.
