= Zvulun =

Zvulun may refer to:

- Zvulun (name)
- Tribe of Zebulun
- Zevulun Regional Council
- Zvulun Valley
