= Khawaled =

Bedouin village in northern Israel

Khawaled: חַ'ואלִד (Hebrew); الخوالد (Arabic)
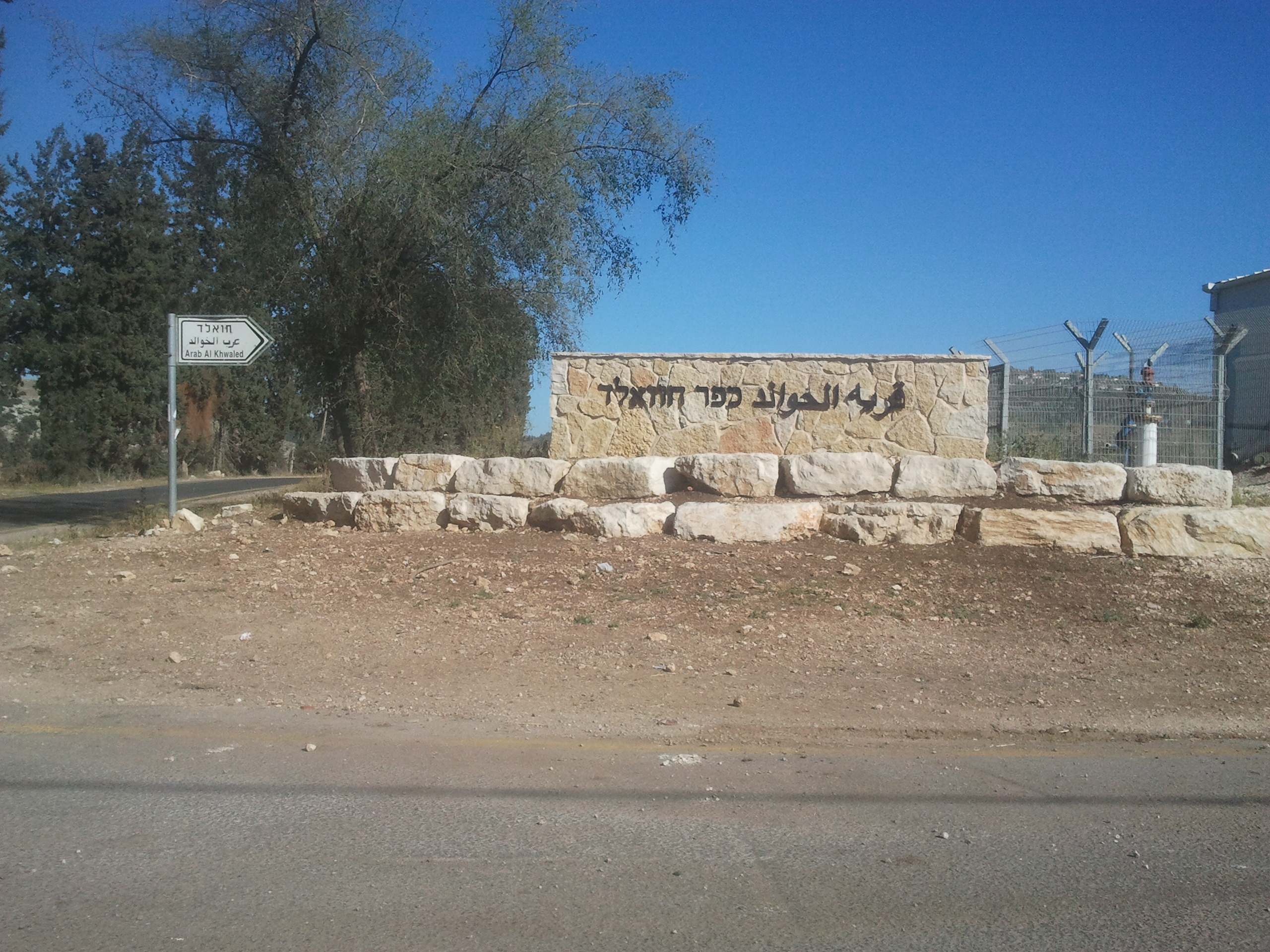
- Village entrance

- Location within Haifa region of Israel Location within Israel
- Coordinates: 32°46′15″N 35°8′12″E
- Country: Israel
- District: Haifa
- Subdistrict: Haifa
- Council: Zevulun
- Population (2024): 762

Khawaled or al-Khawled (Arabic: الخوالد; Hebrew: חַ'ואלִד) is a Bedouin village in northern Israel. Located near Nofit, it falls under the jurisdiction of Zevulun Regional Council. In 2024 it had a population of 762.

The Israeli Bedouin diplomat Ismail Khaldi initiated a project called "Hike and Learn with Bedouins in the Galilee" that has brought thousands of young Jews to the village, to learn about Bedouin culture and history. He said these encounters inspired him to become a diplomat.
