= Kfar HaNoar HaDati =

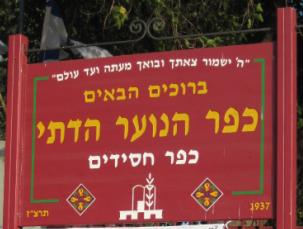

- Location within Haifa region of Israel Location within Israel
- Coordinates: 32°44′34″N 35°5′46″E
- Country: Israel
- District: Haifa
- Subdistrict: Haifa
- Council: Zevulun
- Founded: 1936
- Population (2024): 106

Kfar HaNoar HaDati (Hebrew: כפר הנוער הדתי, lit. The Religious Youth Village) is a youth village in northern Israel. Adjacent to Kfar Hassidim, it falls under the jurisdiction of Zevulun Regional Council. In 2024 it had a population of 106.

== History ==
The school was founded in 1936 and today teaches around 350 students from seventh to twelfth grade, most of whom are new immigrants from Ethiopia who arrive at the school with the help of Youth Aliyah.

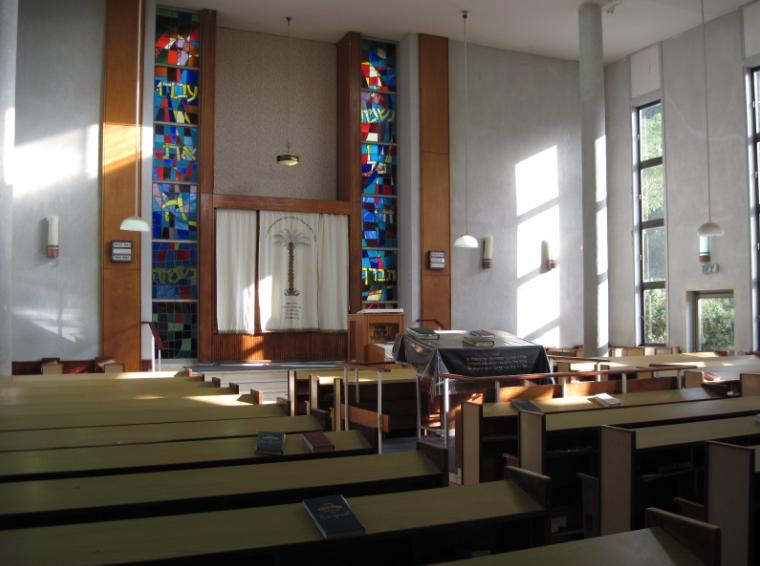
Ohel Yitzhak Synagogue on the premises

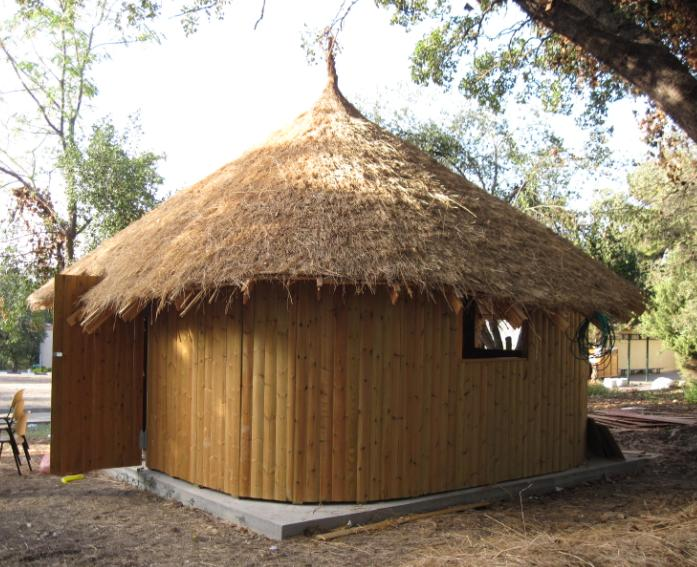
Tukul hut built in Kfar HaNoar HaDati Kfar Hasidim
