= Usha, Israel =

Usha: אוּשָׁה (Hebrew)
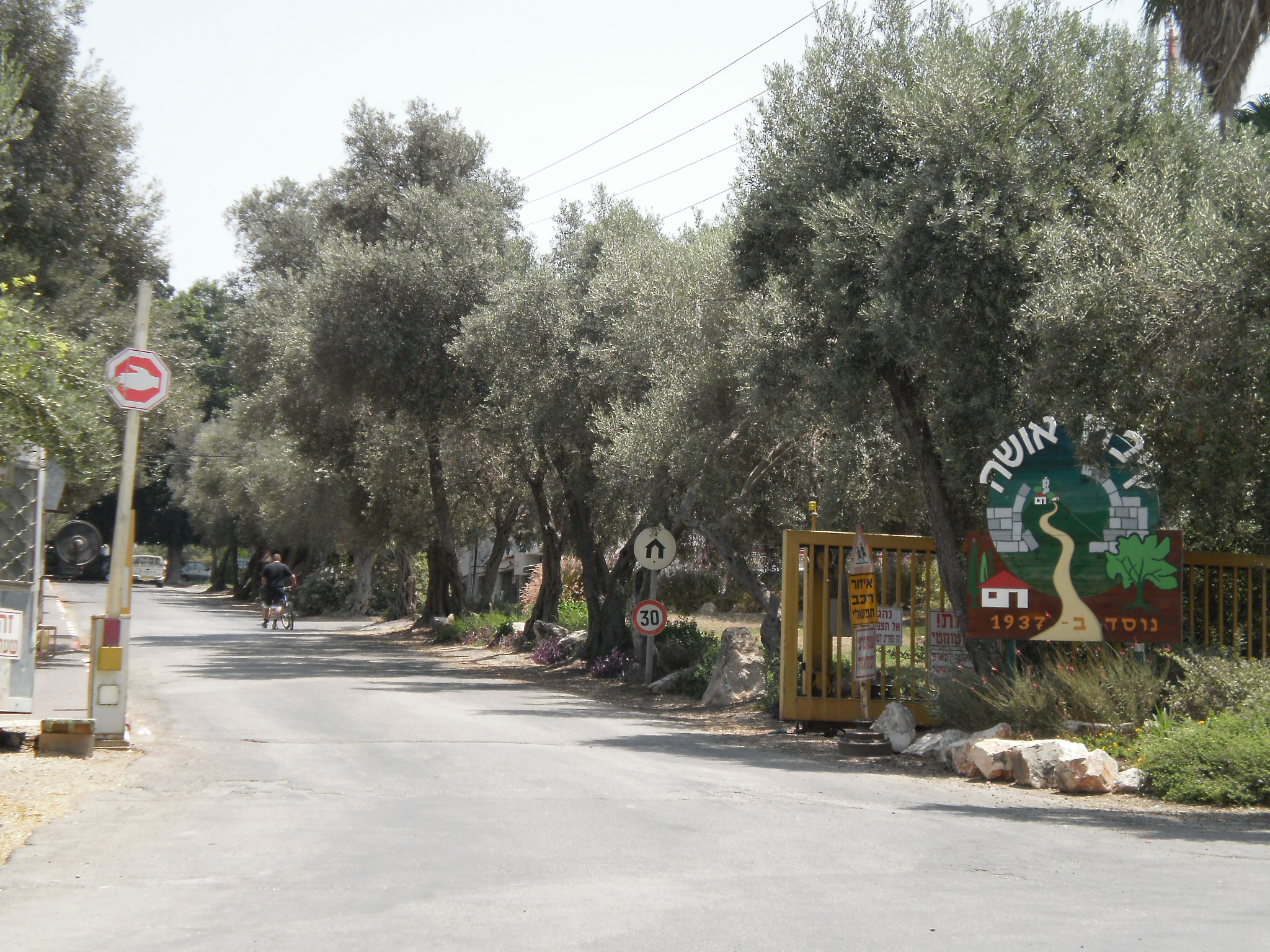
- Entrance to Usha

- Location within Haifa region of Israel Location within Israel
- Coordinates: 32°47′45″N 35°6′50″E
- Country: Israel
- District: Haifa
- Subdistrict: Haifa
- Council: Zevulun
- Affiliation: Kibbutz Movement
- Founded: 9 November 1937
- Founder: Polish Jews
- Population (2024): 612

Usha (Hebrew: אוּשָׁה) is a kibbutz in the western Galilee area of Israel. Located near the city of Kiryat Atta, it falls under the jurisdiction of Zevulun Regional Council. In 2024 it had a population of 612.

== History ==
The kibbutz was founded on 9 November 1937 as a tower and stockade settlement by a Polish Jewish gar'in formed in 1930. Prior to the establishment of the kibbutz, they had organised themselves in several moshavot in the Sharon area, including Kfar Saba, Magdiel and Petah Tikva. The founders were members of the Hanoar Hatzioni youth group, and it was the first kibbutz established by the organisation. Its name was taken from the ancient Jewish city of Usha, which remained in the Arab village Hawsha that was located nearby.

During the 1948 Arab–Israeli War Usha and Ramat Yohanan were attacked by the Druze battalion of the Arab Liberation Army, though the residents of the two settlements managed to repel the attack.

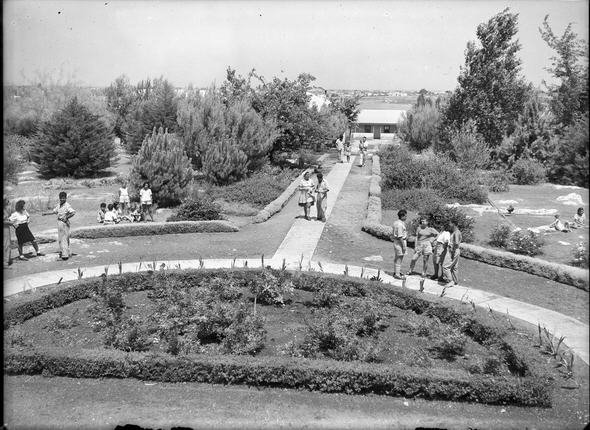
Usha 1946
