= Ras Ali =

Arab village in northern Israel

Ras Ali: ראס עלי (Hebrew); رأس علي (Arabic)
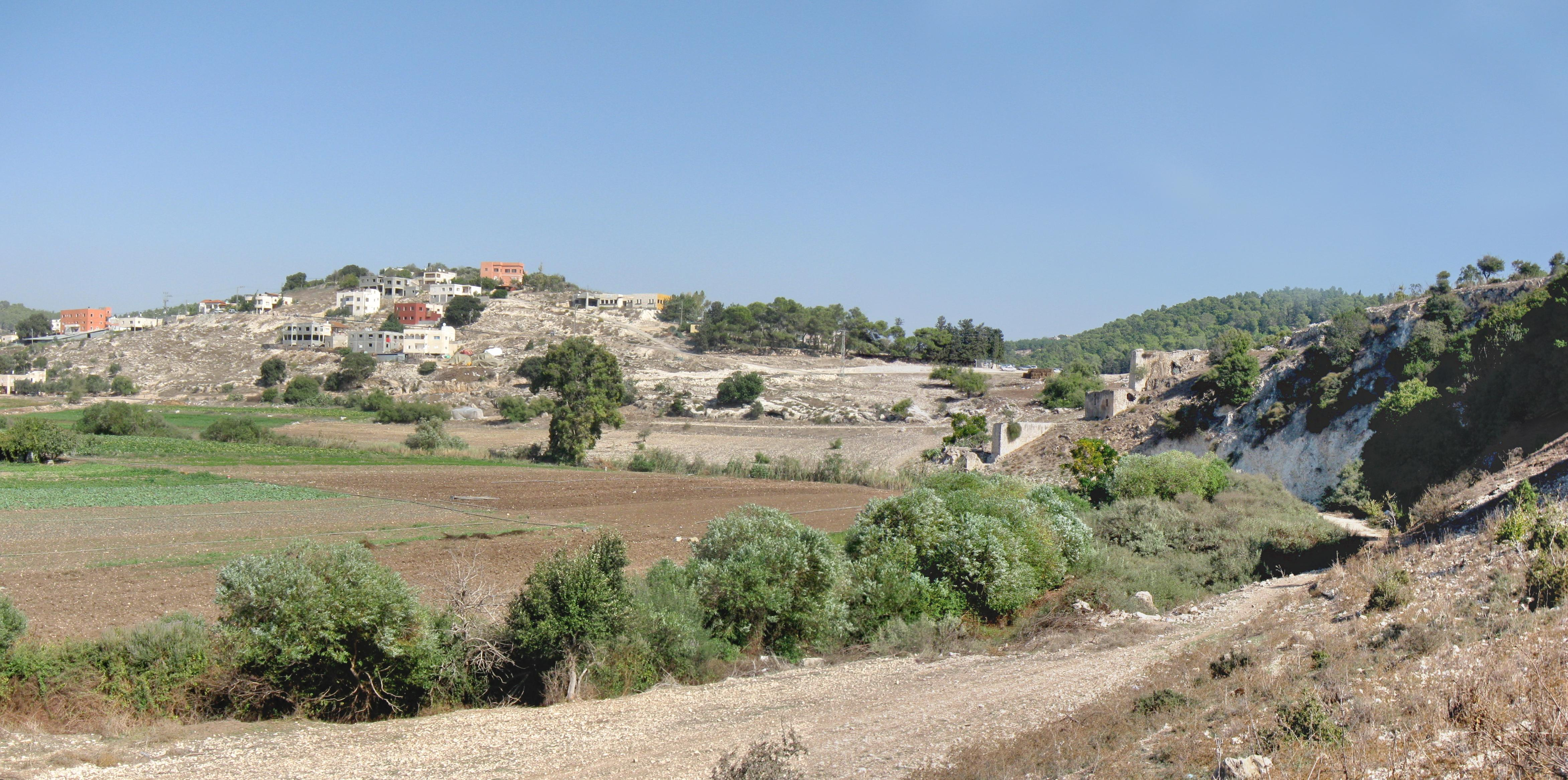

- Location within Haifa region of Israel Location within Israel
- Coordinates: 32°46′20″N 35°09′19″E
- Country: Israel
- District: Haifa
- Subdistrict: Haifa
- Council: Zevulun
- Founded: 1927
- Population (2024): 795

Ras Ali (Arabic: رأس علي, Hebrew: ראס עלי) is an Arab village in northern Israel. Located to the south of Shefa-'Amr, it falls under the jurisdiction of Zevulun Regional Council. In 2024 it had a population of 795.

== History ==
The village was founded in 1927. Its initial residents are thought to have come from the villages of Haris al-Majdal and Kufritta, who returned to the area after their land was bought from the Lebanese Sursock family in 1925.

In the 1945 statistics Ras Ali was counted among Shefa-'Amr suburbs, and it was noted with a population of 80 Muslims.

== Bibliography ==
- Government of Palestine, Department of Statistics (1945). Village Statistics, April, 1945.
- Hadawi, S. (1970). "Village Statistics of 1945: A Classification of Land and Area ownership in Palestine". Palestine Liberation Organization Research Center.
