= Zvulun Valley =

Coordinates: 32.7994936°N 35.0644876°E

A map of Galilee. The Zebulun Valley is along the Haifa Bay

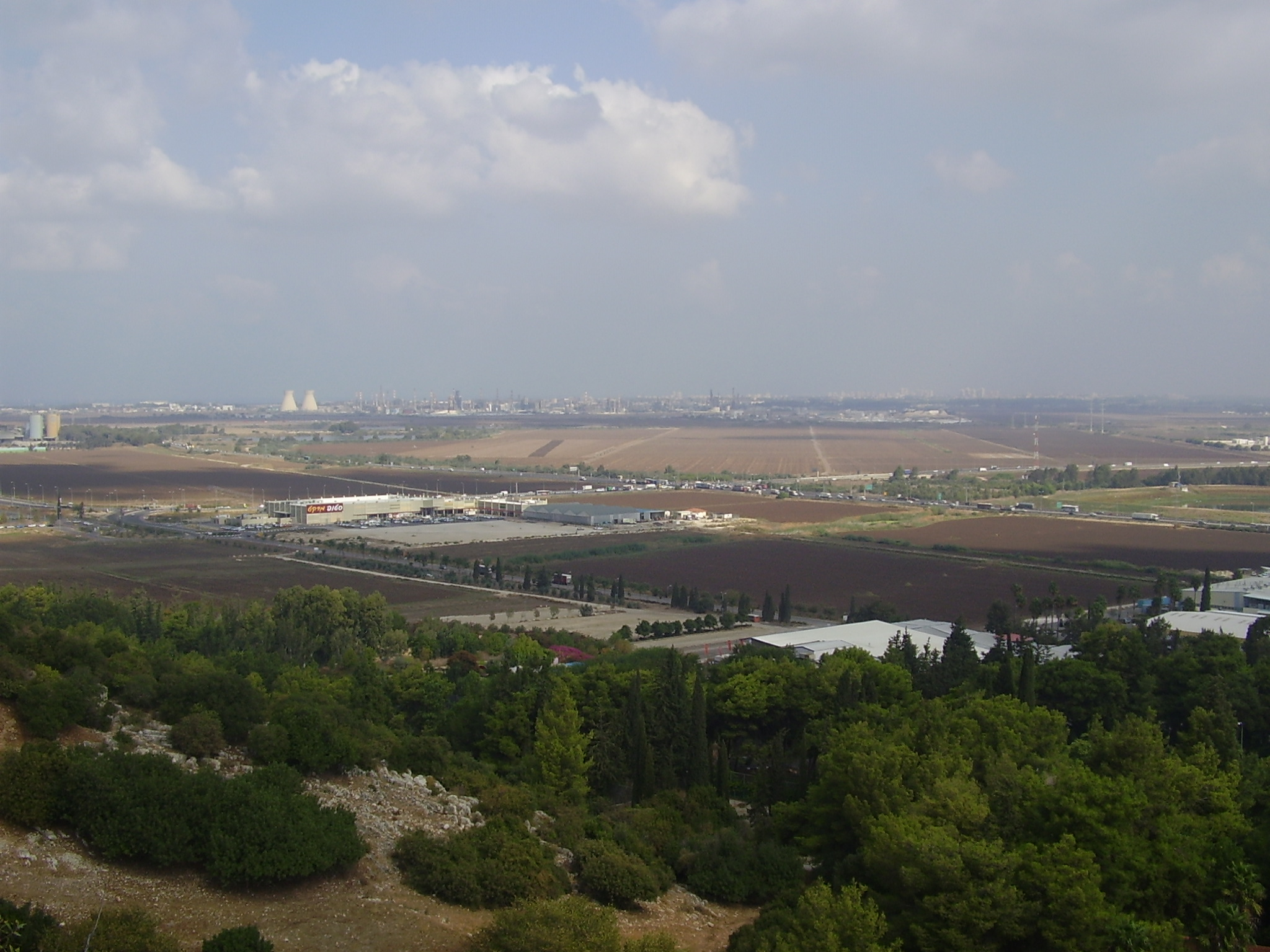
Zevulun Valley

The Zevulun Valley or Zvulun Valley (Hebrew: עמק זבולון, Emek Zvulun) is a fertile coastal territory in the North of Israel, part of the Israeli coastal plain along the Haifa Bay.

The length of the valley is 14 km, with its maximum width is up to 9 kilometers. Geologically it is not a valley, but rather a plain, a continuation of the fault which produces a lowland pathway from the Jordan River to the Haifa Bay — which also includes the Jezreel Valley (which is not a valley in a traditional sense either), the Harod Valley and the Beit She'an Valley.

The Zvulun Valley is bounded by the Naaman River to the North, the Mount Carmel range to the South, Mediterranean Sea / Haifa Bay to the West, and the Alonim – Shfar'am hills of the Lower Galilee to the east. The Kishon River runs along the southern side of the area into the Haifa Bay.

The name of the territory was chosen by a mistake, because according to the descriptions in the Book of Joshua the Zevulun tribe were within the Jezreel Valley, while the land in question belonged to the tribe of Asher.

In the west of the valley are the cities of the Krayot cluster, the center is occupied by the settlements of the Zevulun Regional Council, in the east there are kibbutz Yagur and Kfar Hasidim (both under the jurisdiction of ZRC), Rechasim and some Arab settlements, such as Ibtin.
