= Kfar Hasidim Bet =

Kfar Hasidim Bet: כְּפַר חֲסִידִים ב' (Hebrew)
- Location within Haifa region of Israel
- Coordinates: 32°45′0″N 35°5′24″E
- Country: Israel
- District: Haifa
- Subdistrict: Haifa
- Council: Zevulun
- Founded: 1950
- Founder: Kfar Hasidim residents
- Population (2024): 195

Kfar Hasidim Bet (Hebrew: כְּפַר חֲסִידִים ב', lit. Hasidim Village B) is a community settlement in northern Israel. Located near Nesher, it falls under the jurisdiction of Zevulun Regional Council. In 2024 it had a population of 195.

The village was founded in 1950 by residents of Kfar Hasidim, and was recognised by the state in 1959.
