= Shuli Nachshon =

Israeli video and installation artist

Shuli Nachshon שולי נחשון
- Born: November 13, 1951 (age 74); Essaouira, Morocco
- Died: 2024
- Education: University of Haifa
- Known for: sculpture, painting, installations, body art, drawing and video art
- Notable work: "Numi Numi" 2004
- Awards: First Prize for FOOD PROCESS, Phenomena Festival, Jerusalem

Shuli Nachshon (Hebrew: שולי נחשון; born in Essaouira, Morocco) is a video and installation artist, who lives and works in Israel.

== Biography ==
Nachson emigrated with her family from Morocco to Israel at the age of 4. She grew up in Ofakim, a small town in the south of Israel. Nachshon studied law at the Hebrew University of Jerusalem and later psychology, art and philosophy at the University of Haifa. In her late twenties Nachshon started painting and sculpting and quickly moved to installations, video installations and video art. Nachshon lives in Nofit, Israel and teaches video art at Oranim.

== Work ==
Nachshon's early work is characterized by her connection to earthy elements as a process personal growth, ritual and healing. Through her work she transforms personal memories to collective memories.

=== Selected works ===
- The Shadows refuse to go (1993) a video and installation, University of Haifa.
- White tent - the laundresses (1994) video and installation, Tel Hai, Israel.
- Blue whale (1996) a video installation depicting the artist interacting with wheat, Janco Dada Museum, Ein Hod, Israel.
- Food process (1996) a video and mixed media installation, Phenomena, Jerusalem.
- Wheat (1997) Music and Wheat-Path Installation, Botanical Gardens, Jerusalem.
- Enzymes between Garden Art and Agriculture (1999) "Office in Tel Aviv" gallery, Tel Aviv, Israel.
- Path of bread (2000) a video installation, International Triennial, Haifa Museum, Israel.
- Light (2000) light projecting installation on the river bank, Grenoble, France.
- Picnic (2001) a video installation in Flagstaff, Arizona, U.S.
- Every moment a new beginning (2002) a four-location video installation: 1. High Touch, Tel Aviv 2. Botanical Gardens, Jerusalem 3. Janco Dada Museum, Ein Hod 4. Ben-Gurion School, Kiryat Motzkin.
- Numi Numi (2004) a Lullabies video wall installation, Janco Dada Museum, Ein Hod, Israel.
- The video wall (2005) an ongoing video wall installation, Oranim, Fine Arts Institute.
- Tvila (2006) a video installation, Gal–On Art Space, Tel Aviv.
