= Rekhasim =

Town in Haifa District, Israel

Rekhasim רכסים
- Local council

Hebrew transcription(s)
  - ISO 259: Rkasim
  - Also spelled: Rechasim (unofficial)
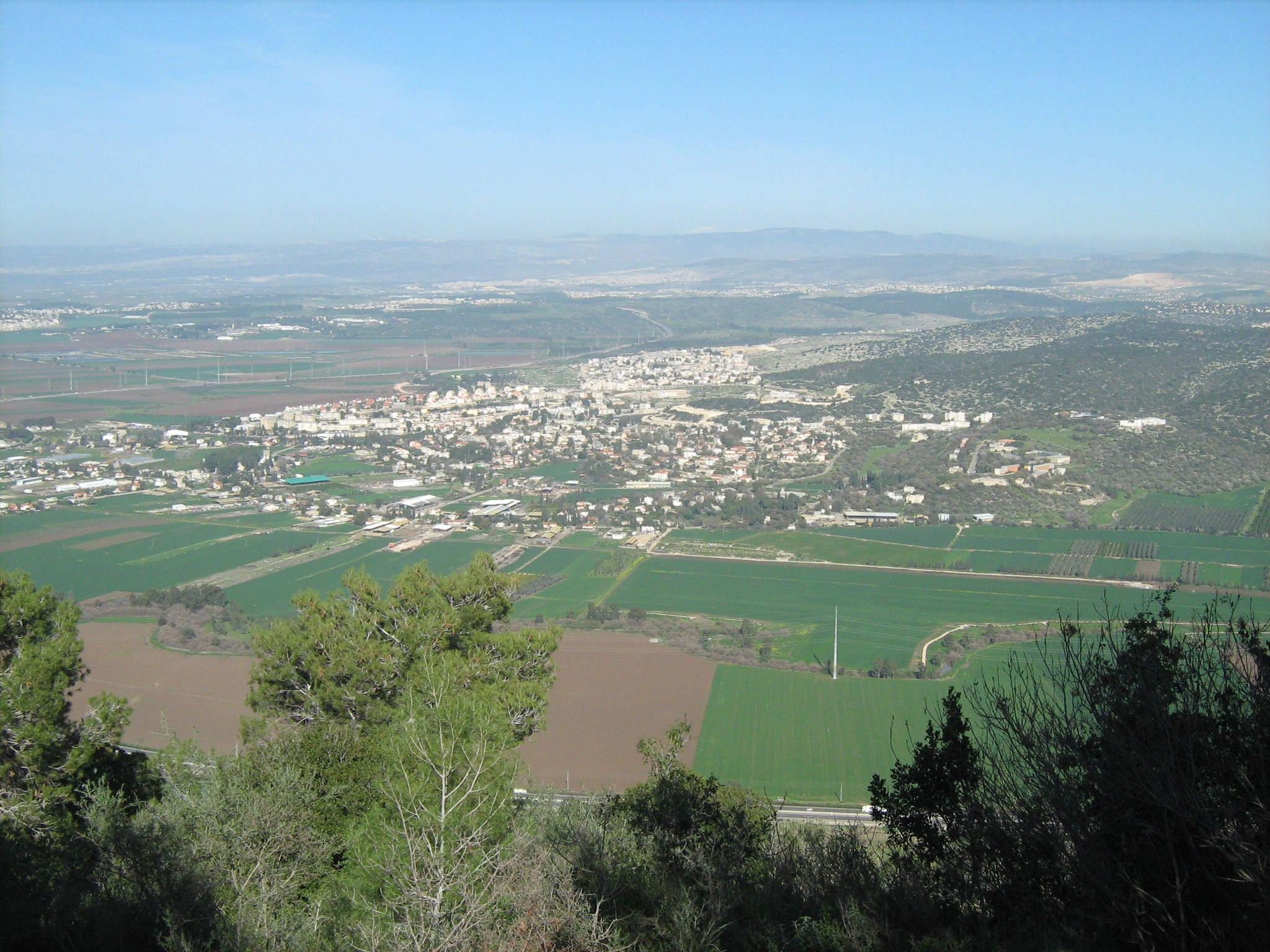
- View of Rekhasim

- Location within Haifa region of Israel Location within Israel
- Coordinates: 32°44′55.78″N 35°6′2.89″E
- Country: Israel
- District: Haifa
- Subdistrict: Haifa
- Founded: 1951

Government
  - Head of Municipality: Itzhak Raih

Area
  - Total: 2,859 dunams (2.859 km^{2}; 1.104 sq mi)

Population (2024)
  - Total: 15,086
  - Density: 5,277/km^{2} (13,670/sq mi)
- Name meaning: Mountain Ridges
- Website: www.rekhasim.muni.il

Rekhasim (Hebrew: רכסים, lit. 'Mountain Ridges') is a Haredi town in the Haifa District of Israel. It is located between Kiryat Tiv'on, Kiryat Ata, and Nesher, next to roads 70, 75, and 762.

With a jurisdiction of 2,859 dunams (~2.9 km^{2}), it had a population of 15,086 in 2024. It is ranked low (2 out of 10) on the Israeli socio-economic scale.

== Etymology ==
The town was named after a verse in the Book of Isaiah (Isaiah 40:4), because it is located on four mountain ranges.

== History ==
Rekhasim was founded in 1951 by released soldiers and residents of nearby ma'abarot. It initially absorbed large numbers of immigrants from India, Morocco, Romania, Russia and Yemen.

In 1955 the Knesses Chizkiyahu yeshiva relocated here from Zikhron Ya'akov. The yeshiva purchased a 10-dunam (0.010 km^{2}; 0.0039 sq mi) lot on the outskirts of the village and five buildings containing a beth midrash, dining hall, dormitories and offices, moving into its new home at the end of April 1955. A small Haredi community developed around the yeshiva, but the majority of residents remained non-Haredi into the 1990s. In 1995 the secular school closed, many non-religious residents left, and the village developed a Haredi majority, with both Ashkenazi and Sephardi neighborhoods. It is now considered a desirable and growing community for young Haredi families.

== Geography ==
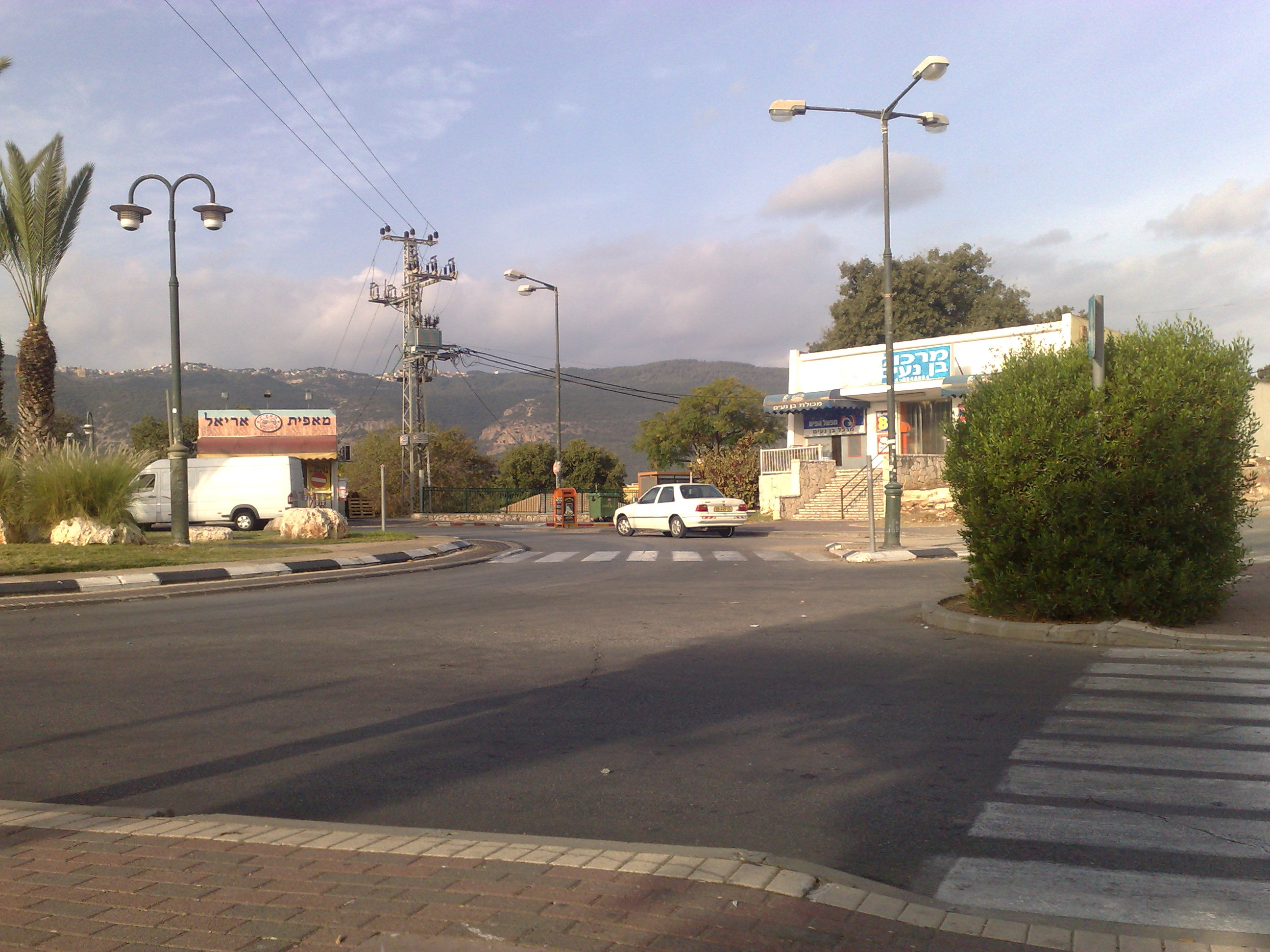
Street in Rekhasim

Rekhasim lies on four hills near Mount Carmel, labelled with Hebrew letters (Hill Alef, Bet, Gimel and Dalet). It borders two villages in the Zvulun Regional Council: the Jewish Kfar Hasidim and Arab Ibtin.

Its lowest elevation is only 19.8 m (65 ft) above sea level, while the highest is at 193.6 m (635 ft). The average temperature in January is 11 °C (52 °F), and 27 °C (81 °F) in August. The average annual precipitation is 650 mm (26 in).

== Demographics ==
Historical population
Year	Pop.	±%
1972	2,500	—
1983	3,500	+40.0%
1995	6,000	+71.4%
2008	9,000	+50.0%
2022	13,910	+54.6%
2024	15,087	+8.5%

== Education ==
Educational offerings include tens of kindergartens, six Talmud Torahs, three girls' schools, three yeshiva ketanas, three yeshiva gedolas, and numerous kolels. In addition to the Knesses Chizkiyahu yeshiva system, there is the Sephardi Yeshivat Rechasim, with 400 students.

Rekhasim has more than 80 synagogues and numerous chesed and gemach organizations.

== Voting Patterns ==
In the 2022 election, 98 percent of voters in Rekhasim voted for the parties of the right-wing coalition led by Benjamin Netanyahu, while 2 percent voted for the parties of the center-left coalition led by Yair Lapid. 89 percent of voters voted for the Haredi parties Shas or UTJ. The Arab parties did not receive any votes.

In the 2026 election, 97 percent of voters in Rekhasim voted for the parties of the right-wing coalition led by Benjamin Netanyahu, while 2 percent voted for the parties of the center-left coalition led by Gadi Eisenkot and 0.01 percent voted for the Arab parties. An additional 0.2 percent voted for the Reservists, and 0.3 percent voted for Amcha Yisrael. 87 percent of voters voted for the Haredi parties Shas or UTJ. Voter turnout increased 17 percent from the 2022 election.
