= Ramat Yohanan =

Kibbutz in northern Israel

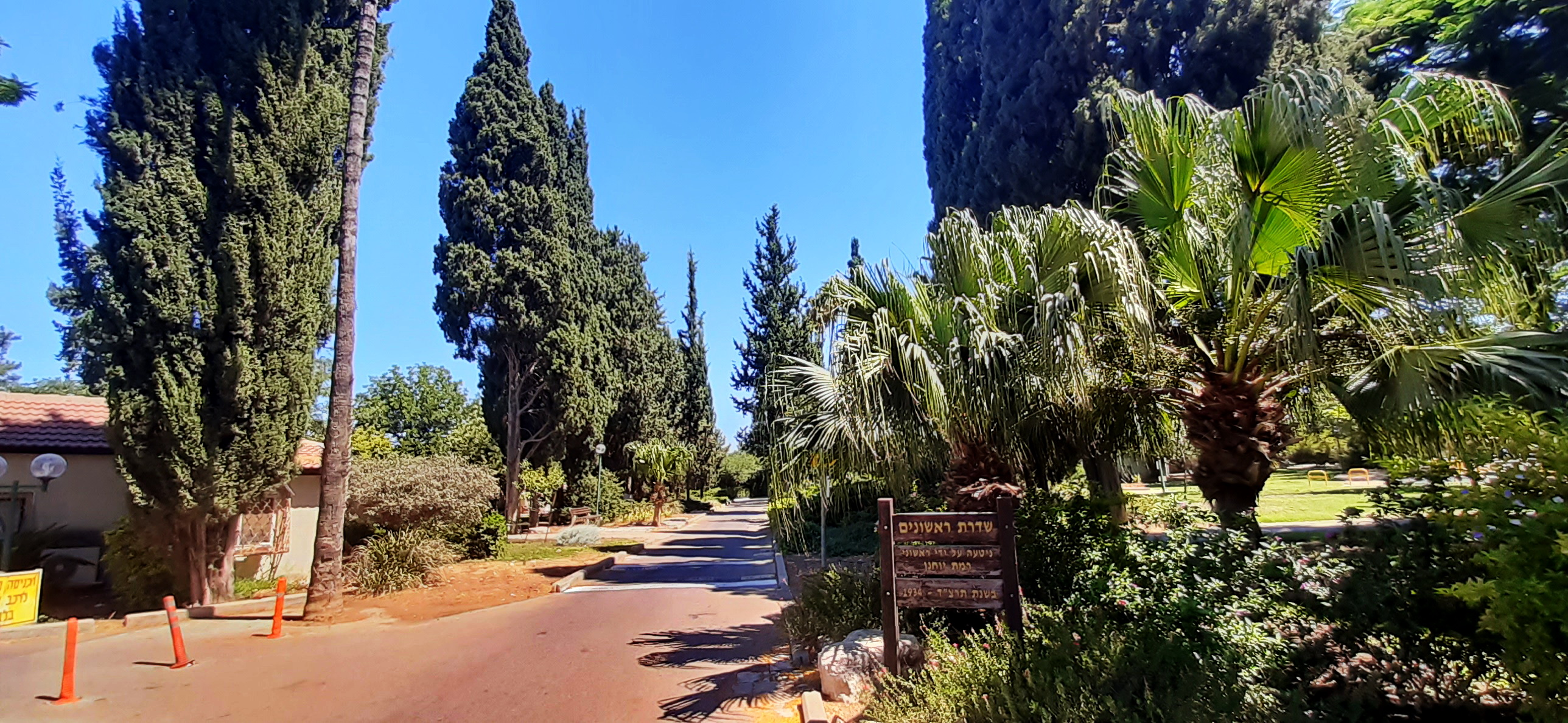
- Etymology: Yohanan Heights
- Location within Haifa region of Israel
- Coordinates: 32°47′34″N 35°7′17″E
- Country: Israel
- District: Haifa
- Subdistrict: Haifa
- Council: Zevulun
- Affiliation: Kibbutz Movement
- Founded: 1931
- Founder: Sabras and American Jews
- Population (2024): 1,162
- Website: www.kry.org.il

Ramat Yohanan (Hebrew: רָמַת יוֹחָנָן, lit. 'Yohanan Heights') is a kibbutz in northern Israel. Located near Kiryat Ata and adjacent to the kibbutzim of Kfar HaMaccabi and Usha, it falls under the jurisdiction of Zevulun Regional Council. In 2024 it had a population of 1,162. In 2014, Forbes Israel ranked the Kibbutz as the 6th richest in Israel with an estimated value of 250 million Shekels.

== History ==
The kibbutz was founded in 1931 on land bought by Yehoshua Hankin from the Lebanese in 1925. The founders were a mix of native Jews and immigrants from the United States. It was named after the South African politician Jan Smuts, who was a prominent supporter of Zionism and a personal friend of Chaim Weizmann. Upon graduating high school in 1940, Yitzhak Rabin joined the kibbutz's Noar Ha’oved (Working Youth) training program.

It was the location of the Battle of Ramat Yohanan during the 1947–1948 Civil War in Mandatory Palestine. The Druze regiment of the Arab Liberation Army were confronted by the Haganah soldiers. During the battle the defenders ran out of ammunition and fought with knives before they were re-supplied. Subsequently, the Druze ran out of ammunition and withdrew to their base in Shefa-'Amr with many casualties.

== Economy ==
The kibbutz grows produce including mainly avocado, lychee and citrus fruits. The kibbutz has large dairy farm of 600 milk cows, thousand acres of fields, and a large chicken breeding farm.

The main economical power of the kibbutz comes from the company Palram, which mainly manufactures plastic sheets for the building industry . and Canopia which manufacturers garden and outdoor products.

Beginning in the 1970s, Ramat Yohanan hosted an ulpan program. In recent years aimed primarily at American and Russian students, the program ceased operating in 2017 mostly due to Israeli government changes to immigration evaluations.

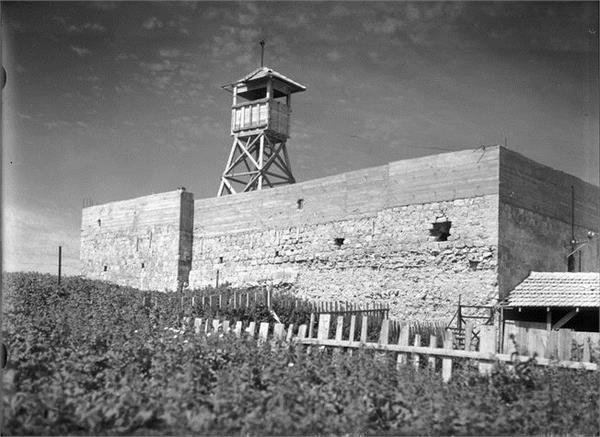
Ramat Yohanan watchtower 1941

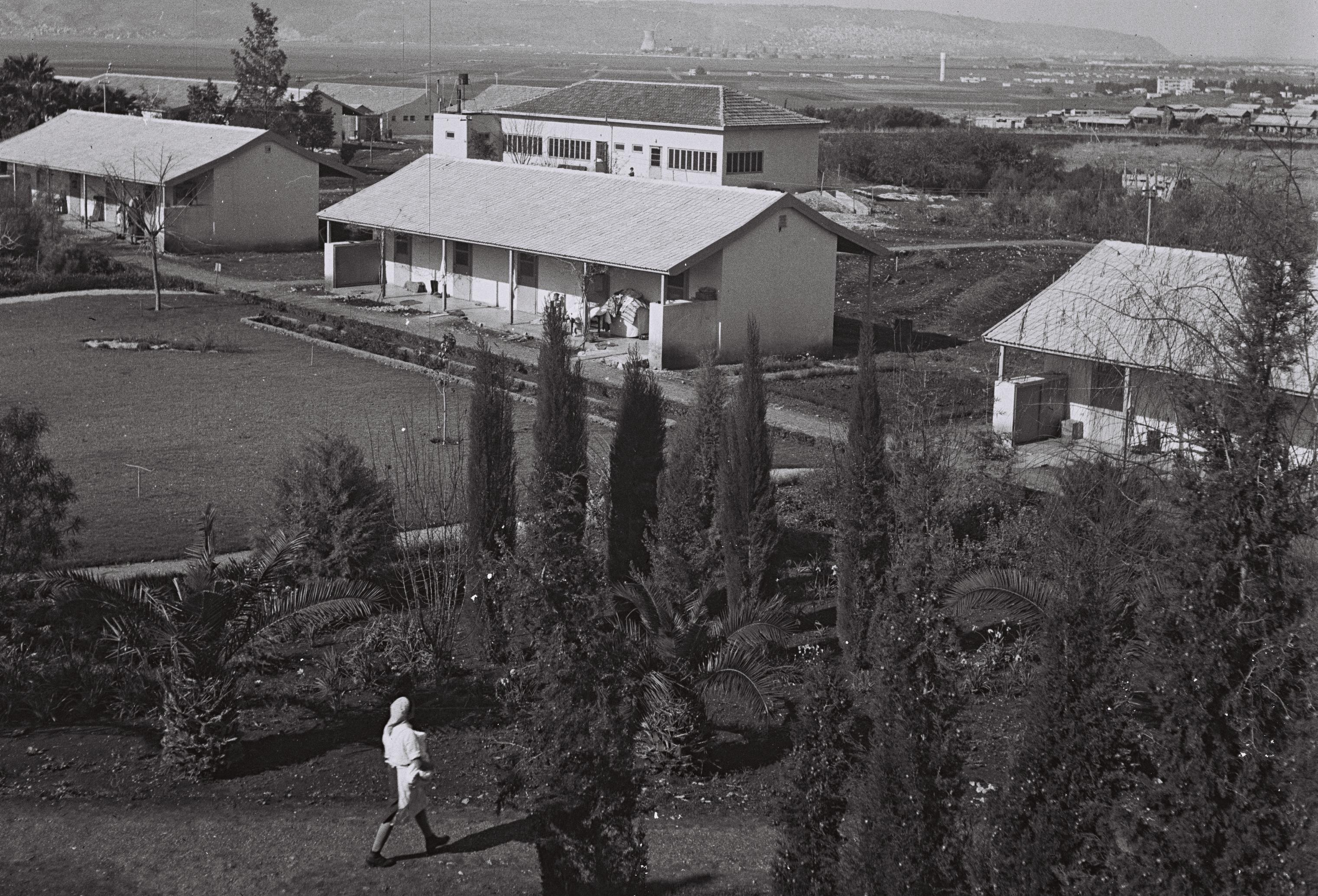
Ramat Yohanan 1944

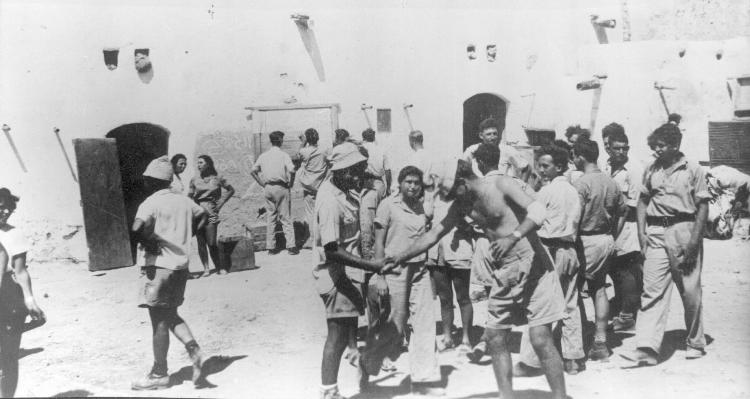
Members of the Yiftach Brigade stationed at Ramat Yohanan in 1948

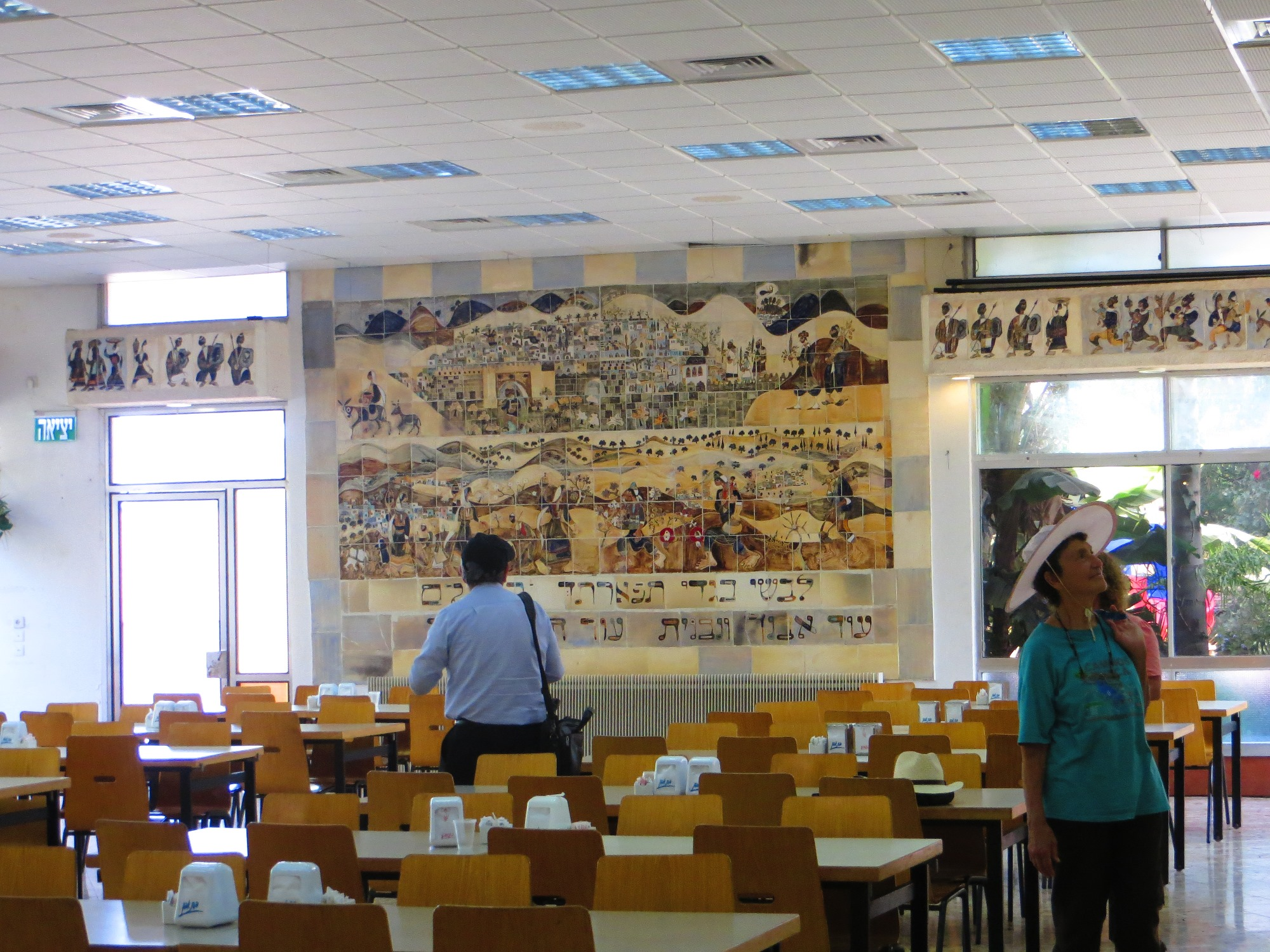
Kibbutz dining room with murals
