= Ibtin =

Bedouin village in northern Israel

Ibtin: إبطن (Hebrew); אִבְּטִין (Arabic)
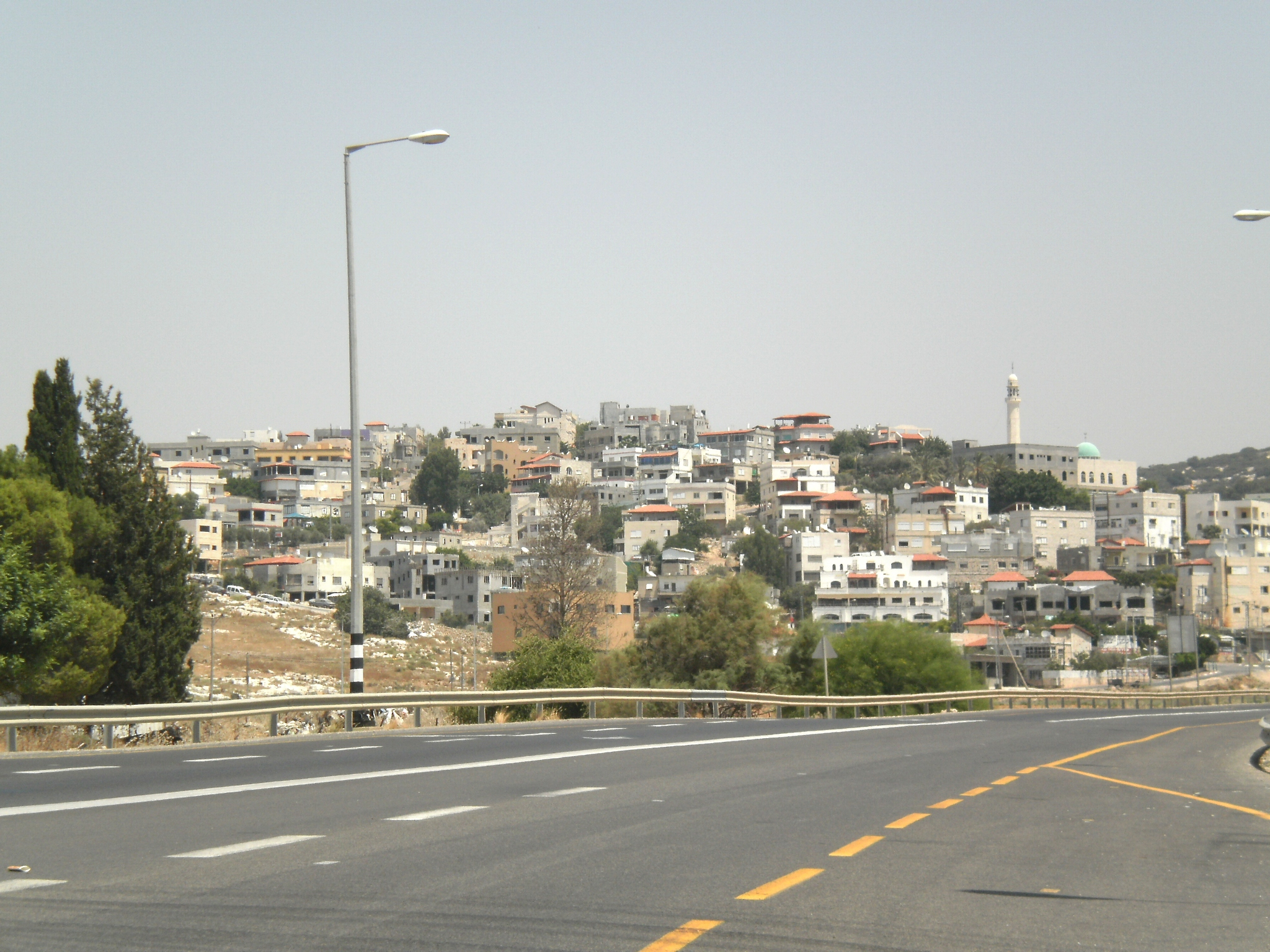

- Location within Haifa region of Israel Location within Israel
- Coordinates: 32°45′36″N 35°6′48″E
- Country: Israel
- District: Haifa
- Subdistrict: Haifa
- Council: Zevulun
- Founded: 1965
- Population (2024): 2,837

Ibtin (Arabic: إبطن; Hebrew: אִבְּטִין) is a Bedouin village in northern Israel. Located in the Lower Galilee around half a kilometre from Kfar Hasidim, it falls under the jurisdiction of Zevulun Regional Council. In 2024 it had a population of 2,837.

The sacred tree of U'm Ayash is located in the village, which according to legend, has stones roll under it every Friday.

== History ==
An ancient ruin known as Hurvat Ivtan or Khirbet Ibtin is located at the western part of the village. The site is identified with the ancient village Bethbeten mentioned in Eusebius' Onomasticon, which was composed in the early 4th century CE.

The village was established in 1965 for the Amria tribe as part of a plan to settle the Bedouin in the area in permanent settlements.

== Bibliography ==
- Talmi, Limor (2015-04-19). "Ibtin (South) Final Report". Hadashot Arkheologiyot – Excavations and Surveys in Israel (127).
- Palmer, E. H. (1881). The Survey of Western Palestine: Arabic and English Name Lists Collected During the Survey by Lieutenants Conder and Kitchener, R. E. Transliterated and Explained by E.H. Palmer. Committee of the Palestine Exploration Fund.
