= Oranim Academic College =

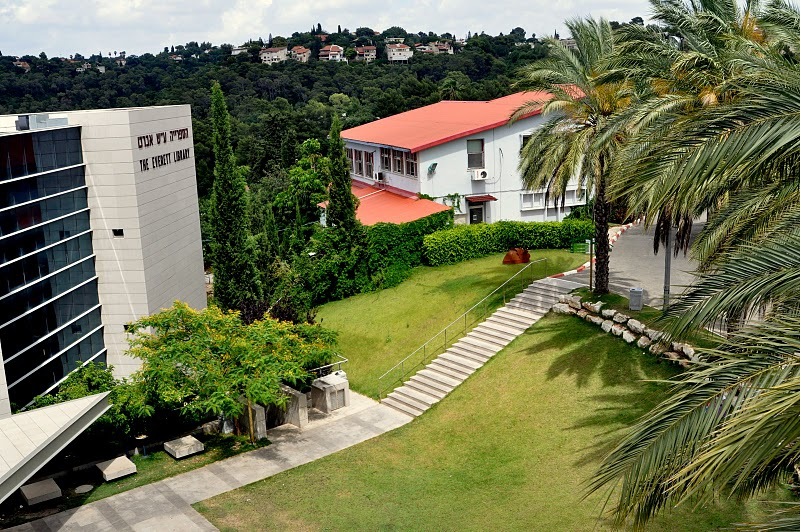
- The Oranim college library and arts complex

- Location within Haifa region of Israel Location within Israel
- Coordinates: 32°46′15″N 35°8′12″E
- Country: Israel
- District: Haifa
- Subdistrict: Haifa
- Council: Zevulun
- Founded: 1951
- Population (2024): 106
- Website: www.oranim.ac.il

Oranim (Hebrew: אֳרָנִים or אורנים, lit. 'Pines') is a college of education in northern Israel. The college was founded in 1951 by the United Kibbutz Movement. It was named after the small forest of pine trees in the area. It offers BA degrees in a variety of fields in the humanities and social sciences, BSc degrees in a variety of sciences, BEd degrees in kindergarten, elementary and upper school studies, and MEd and MTeach degrees.

== Notable alumni ==
- Ruth Calderon, Talmud scholar and politician
- Joshua Sobol (born 1939), playwright, writer, and director

== Notable faculty ==
- Ya'acov Dorchin (born 1946), Israeli sculptor and painter
- Miriam Roth (1910–2005), Israeli writer and scholar of children's books, kindergarten teacher, and educator

== See also ==
- Oranim Academic College alumni
- Academic staff of Oranim Academic College
- List of universities and colleges in Israel
