= Kfar HaMaccabi =

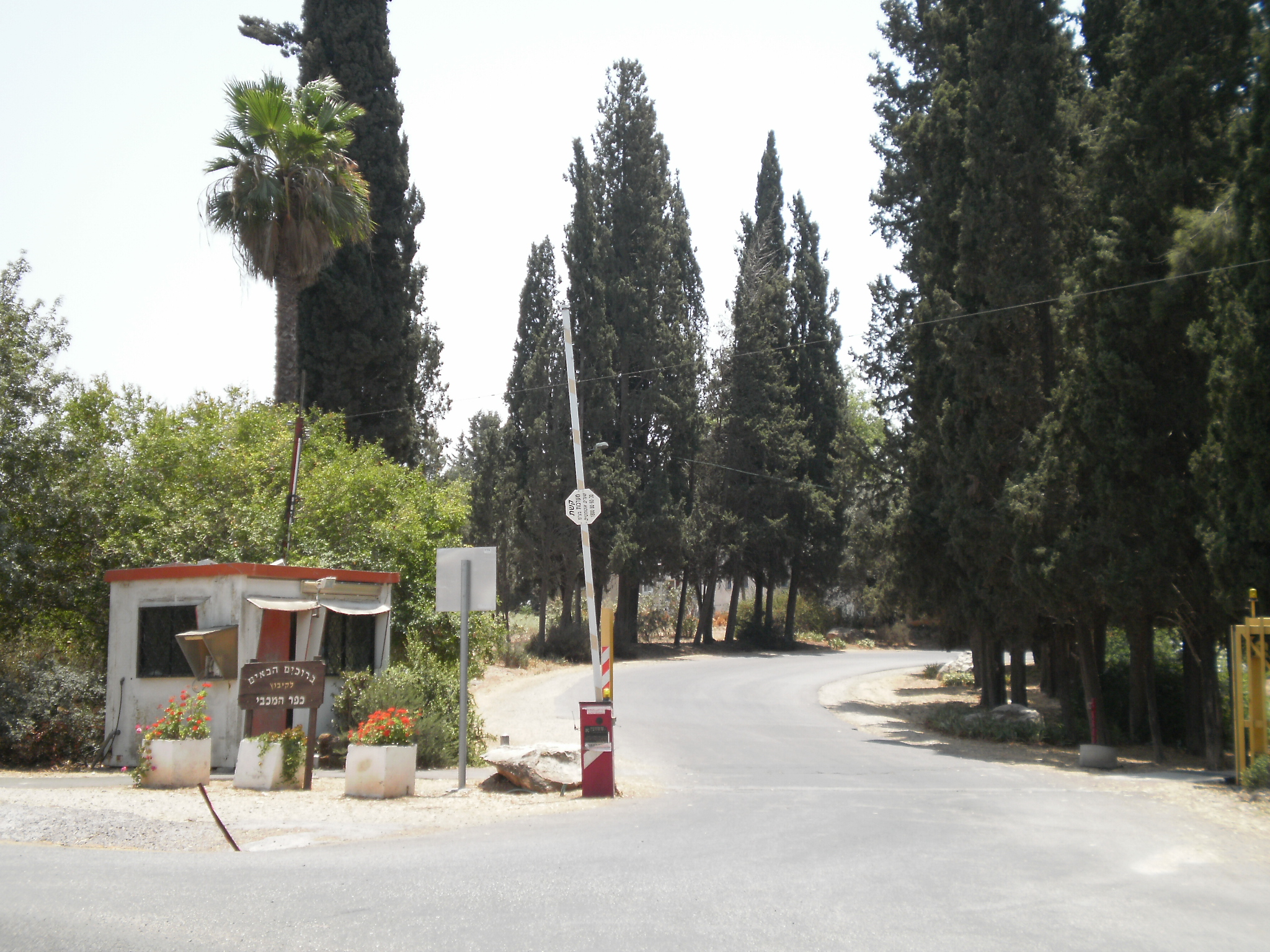

- Location within Haifa region of Israel
- Coordinates: 32°47′25″N 35°6′56″E
- Country: Israel
- District: Haifa
- Subdistrict: Haifa
- Council: Zevulun Regional Council
- Affiliation: Kibbutz Movement
- Founded: 1936
- Founder: Maccabi youth movement members
- Population (2024): 453

Kfar HaMaccabi (Hebrew: כְּפַר הַמַּכַּבִּי, lit. Village of the Maccabis) is a kibbutz in northern Israel. Located near Kiryat Ata, it falls under the jurisdiction of Zevulun Regional Council. In 2024 it had a population of 453.

== History ==
The village was founded in 1936 by members of Maccabi youth movement from Czechoslovakia and Germany who immigrated with the help of Menachem Ussishkin for the first Maccabiah Games in 1932. The kibbutz was named for the youth movement.

== Economy ==
The kibbutz is now one of Israel's largest animal feed manufacturers. This branch of income has been sold as have other branches. The new owners pay rent and the salary of the members that work in the branches.

== Notable people ==
- Theodore Bikel
- Nachum Heiman
