= Nachum Heiman =

Israeli composer and musician (1934–2016)

Nachum Heiman נחום היימן
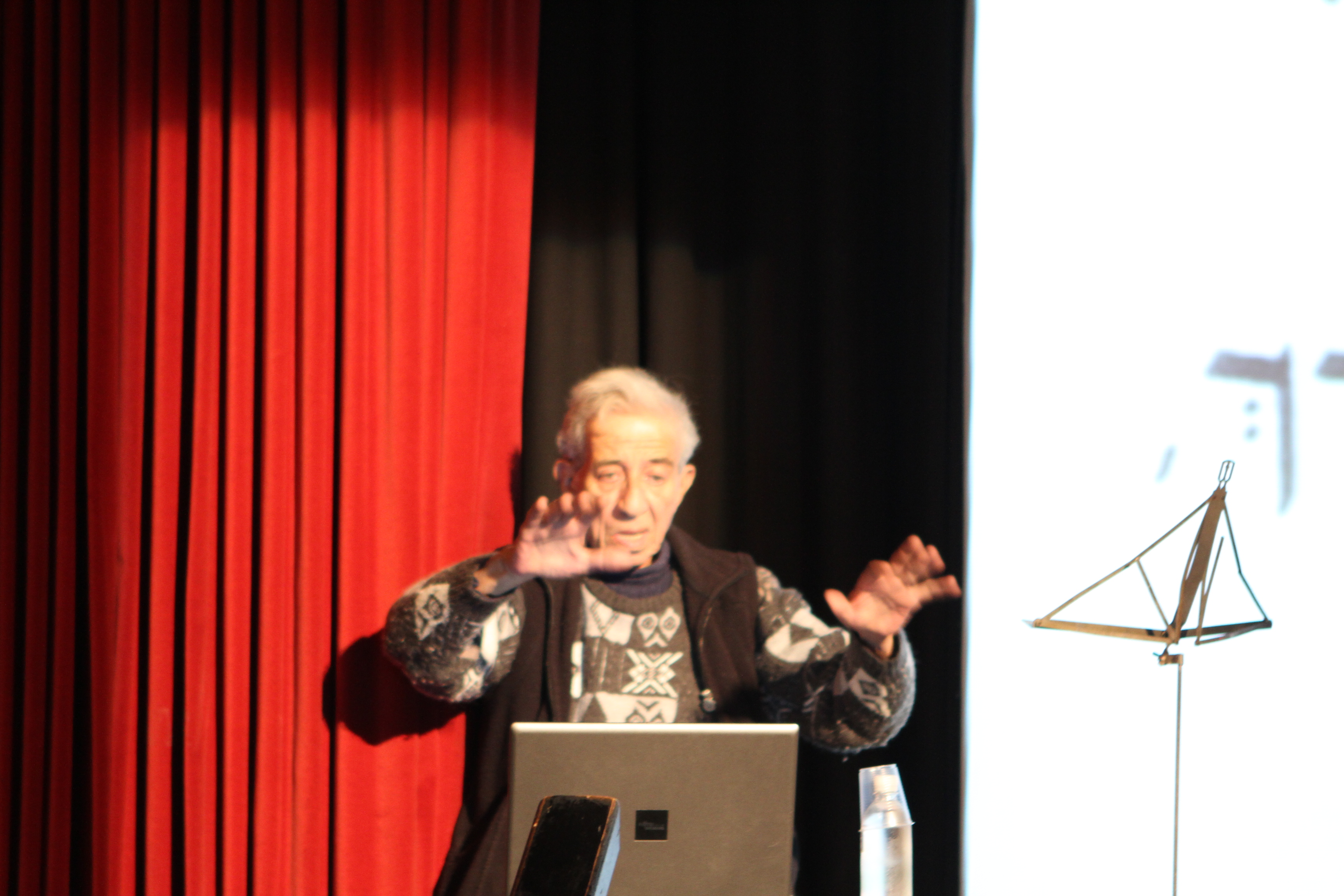

Background information
- Born: May 6, 1934; Riga, Latvia
- Died: August 17, 2016 (aged 82) Kfar Saba, Israel
- Genres: Folk
- Occupations: Musician, composer
- Instruments: Piano, accordion, harmonica
- Years active: 1951–2016
- Website: https://nachumheiman.co.il/

Nachum Heiman (Hebrew: נחום היימן; May 6, 1934 – August 17, 2016) was an Israeli composer and musician. Some of the over 1,000 songs he composed have become classics of Israeli folk music.

== Biography ==
Nachum (Nakhche) Heiman was born in Riga, Latvia in 1934 to a musical family that immigrated to Mandatory Palestine when he was five years old. As a child he began playing the piano. After becoming ill with polio at the age of nine, he switched to playing the accordion and the harmonica. He was hospitalized for three and a half years in an iron lung until he recovered. At age 14, following his parents' divorce, he moved to Kibbutz Na'an as a yeled hutz (child from outside the kibbutz), where he studied with kibbutz members Yehuda Oren and composer David Zahavi.

After his mother remarried, he moved with her to Rehovot, where he composed his first song, "Nitzanim niru ba'aretz" (text from the Song of Songs) at 17 years of age. Since he did not get along with his stepfather, he moved to Kfar HaMaccabi, where he met Matityahu Shalem from nearby Kibbutz Ramat Yohanan. He worked with Shalem as a shepherd and studied with him and his colleagues. Under the influence of Gurit Kadman, one of the pioneers of Israeli folk dance, Heiman began to work as an accordionist for folk-dancing events.

In the army, Heiman coordinated song and dance classes and played the accordion for the first Nahal troupe. He fought in three wars and was wounded in all of them. When he married Dalia Colton, the mother of his two daughters – Billie and Si, a well-known singer – they moved to Kibbutz Beit Alpha.

Heiman died in Meir Hospital in Kfar Saba on August 17, 2016, of a severe infection following prolonged ill health. He was 82.

== Music career ==
Heiman worked as a music teacher and established the Gevatron choir. He composed dozens of songs for the poet Natan Yonatan, took young singers and bands under his wing in the 1960s, and wrote music for 122 films and TV shows. From the late 1960s to the mid-1980s he lived in Paris and London, where he ran a music production and record company, Hi-Man Music. He worked with artists such as Nana Mouskouri, Marie Laforêt, Serge Lama, Rika Zarai, Mike Brant, Carlos Miranda, Luis Jardim, Geoff Downes and Hanny Livne.

In 1999, Heiman declared bankruptcy, but eventually repaid all his debts. In 2002, he established the Hebrew Song Heritage Association, a non-profit organization devoted to Israel's musical heritage. He devoted his time to restoring early Hebrew recordings, and served as the association's artistic director until his retirement in 2011. In 2009 he won the Israel Prize in the field of Hebrew song.

In his latter years, twice divorced and separated from his third wife, Heiman suffered from ill health and financial hardship. A television feature about him prompted Prime Minister Benjamin Netanyahu and then-Culture Minister Limor Livnat to employ him as a consultant for a project to preserve and document Hebrew songs. A documentary of his life, made by Anat Goren, was aired in 2015 on Israel's Yes Docu channel.

== See also ==
- Music of Israel
