= Ido Weisman =

Israeli film director and cinematographer (born 1989)

- Born: 1989 (age 36–37)
- Education: Tel Aviv University (BFA)
- Occupations: Film director; Cinematographer
- Years active: 2018–present
- Known for: Requiem for a Whale (2022); Sun Bay (2025)
- Awards: David L. Wolper Student Documentary Award (2022)
- Website: www.idoweisman.com

Ido Weisman (born 1989) is an Israeli film director and cinematographer known for his documentary films Requiem for a Whale (2022) and Sun Bay (2025). His work has received awards at the International Documentary Association (IDA) Documentary Awards, the Docaviv International Documentary Film Festival and the Flickers' Rhode Island International Film Festival.

== Early life and education ==
Weisman was born in 1989 and grew up in Nofit, a village in northern Israel. He earned a Bachelor of Fine Arts degree from the Steve Tisch School of Film and Television at Tel Aviv University.

== Career ==
=== Early films ===
Weisman began his filmmaking career with several short films, including the documentaries Horah (2018) and Uzzi (2018), and the narrative short Pool (2019). Uzzi was shortlisted for the BAFTA Student Film Awards.

=== Requiem for a Whale ===
In 2022, Weisman directed and photographed the short documentary Requiem for a Whale, which examines the responses of people who encountered the carcass of a whale that washed ashore at Nitzanim beach in Israel in 2021.

The film won the David L. Wolper Student Documentary Award at the 2022 IDA Documentary Awards, with Weisman credited as its director and producer. It also received the Best Student Film award at the Israeli Documentary Forum Awards and won second place and the cinematography award in the student competition at the 2022 Docaviv International Documentary Film Festival.

In 2023, Requiem for a Whale was nominated for the Ophir Award for Best Documentary Short Film. The film was subsequently distributed through The New Yorker, which published the documentary in August 2023 alongside an article discussing its themes and production.

=== Sun Bay ===
Weisman's feature-length documentary debut, Sun Bay (2025), follows three residents of a trailer park in Eilat, Israel. The film explores loneliness, social marginalisation and the residents' relationships with their past lives.

The film won the First Feature Award at the 2025 Docaviv International Documentary Film Festival and at the 2025 Israeli Documentary Forum Awards.

In August 2026, Sun Bay received the Grand Prize for Best Documentary Feature at the Flickers' Rhode Island International Film Festival in the United States.

The following month, Weisman received the Best Director Award for the film at the Moscow International Documentary Film Festival DOKer.

Sun Bay was also among the five finalists for Best Documentary Feature at the 2026 Ophir Awards. It was broadcast on Kan 11 in early 2026.

=== Television and other recognition ===
In 2025, Weisman directed the Israeli television programme You Have to Read This!, which aired on Kan 11.

In 2026, he was included in Docaviv's "20 Under 40" selection, recognising emerging figures in Israeli documentary filmmaking.

== Filmography ==
Year	Title	Type	Role
2018	Horah	Documentary short	Director, cinematographer
2018	Uzzi	Documentary short	Director, cinematographer
2019	Pool	Narrative short	Director
2022	Requiem for a Whale	Documentary short	Director, producer, cinematographer
2025	Sun Bay	Documentary feature	Director, cinematographer

== Television ==
Year	Title	Broadcaster	Role
2025	You Have to Read This!	Kan 11	Director

== Awards and nominations ==
Year	Award or festival	Category	Work	Result
2022	Docaviv International Documentary Film Festival	Student Competition – Second Prize	Requiem for a Whale	Won
2022	Docaviv International Documentary Film Festival	Student Competition – Cinematography Award	Requiem for a Whale	Won
2022	Israeli Documentary Forum Awards	Best Student Film	Requiem for a Whale	Won
2022	IDA Documentary Awards	David L. Wolper Student Documentary Award	Requiem for a Whale	Won
2023	Ophir Awards	Best Documentary Short Film	Requiem for a Whale	Nominated
2025	Docaviv International Documentary Film Festival	First Feature Award	Sun Bay	Won
2025	Israeli Documentary Forum Awards	First Feature Award	Sun Bay	Won
2026	Flickers' Rhode Island International Film Festival	Grand Prize for Best Documentary Feature	Sun Bay	Won
2026	Moscow International Documentary Film Festival DOKer	Best Director	Sun Bay	Won
2026	Ophir Awards	Best Documentary Feature	Sun Bay	Nominated

== Personal life ==
Weisman was in a relationship with Israeli actress Shira Haas for more than four years. Their separation was reported in January 2025.

Weisman resides in Tel Aviv, Israel.
