= Ishmael Khaldi =

Israeli diplomat (born 1971)

Ismail Khaldi
- إسماعيل خالدي
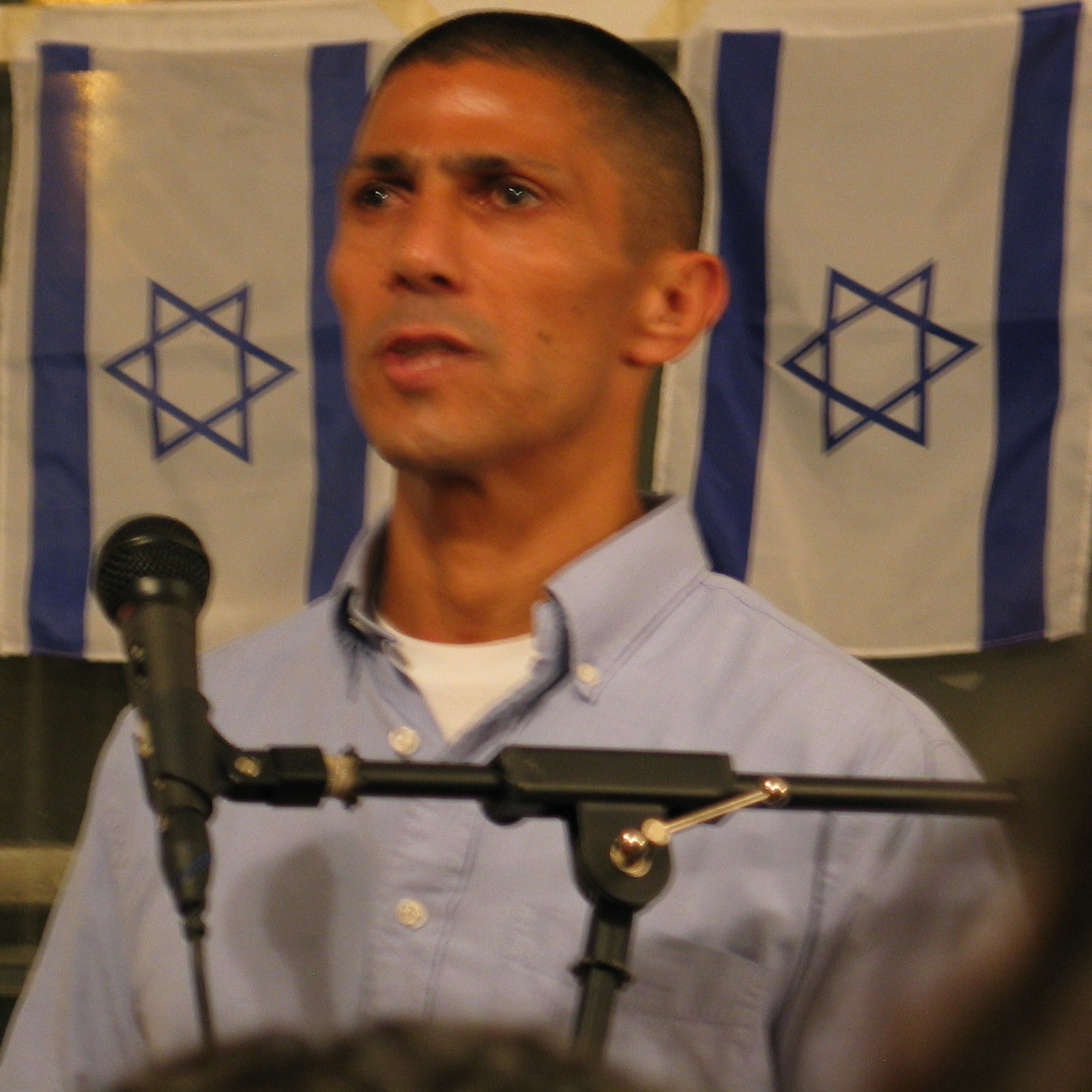

Israeli Vice Consul, San Francisco
- In office December 2006 – August 2009
- Preceded by: Omer Caspi

Personal details
- Born: 1971 (age 54–55) Khawalid, Israel
- Website: http://www.ishmaelkhaldi.com

Ismail Khaldi (Arabic: إسماعيل خالدي, Hebrew: איסמעיל חאלדי; born 1971) is the first Bedouin diplomat in the Israeli Ministry of Foreign Affairs.

== Early life ==
Ismail Khaldi was born in Khawaled, Israel a village near Haifa. He is the third of eleven children. He lived in a Bedouin tent until the age of eight. He walked four miles (6 km) round trip to attend school and tended flocks of sheep. He said his family's ties with its Jewish neighbors go back to the days of the early Zionist pioneers from Eastern Europe who settled in the Galilee region in the 1920s.

Khaldi earned a bachelor's degree in political science from the University of Haifa and a master's degree in political science and international relations from Tel Aviv University. He served in the Israeli Ministry of Defense, Israel Police, and in the Israel Defense Forces as a political analyst.

Khaldi initiated a project called "Hike and Learn with Bedouins in the Galilee" that has brought thousands of young Jews to Khawaled to learn about Bedouin culture and history. He said these encounters inspired him to become a diplomat.

== Diplomatic career ==
Khaldi began working for the Israeli Foreign Ministry in 2004. In June 2006, he was appointed to serve in San Francisco, California, United States. In August 2009, Khaldi was appointed policy advisor to the Minister of Foreign Affairs Avigdor Lieberman. He describes Lieberman as "one of the most realistic, of course, but honest and direct politicians in Israel."

On Sunday 5th Jul 2020, an internal committee appointed Ishmael Khaldi as Israel's first Bedouin Ambassador, to take up the post in Eritrea.

In June, 2020, Khaldi filed a police complaint after he was stopped by security guards at Jerusalem’s central bus station and physically assaulted. The guards said he refused to cooperate when asked for identification. Khaldi claimed it was a case of ethnic profiling.

== Anti-Israel protests ==
In 2011, Khaldi was invited to give a talk at the University of Edinburgh's Jewish Society. Pro-Palestinian protesters disrupted the event, which was declared a blow to freedom of speech on campuses. University security officers had to be brought in after 50 protesters claimed to have shut down a lecture.

He was also disrupted by activists at Rutgers University and by Julio Pino, a former professor of history at Kent State, who shouted "Death to Israel" during his lecture.

== Political views ==
Khaldi said there is still a long way to go before the Bedouin minority achieves full equality in Israel but the situation is improving, and more Bedouins are graduating from high school, entering universities and getting better jobs than ever before. "There are differences in tradition and religion between us, but at the end of the day we are all Israeli citizens". He considers himself a proud Bedouin and regards a Jewish state as beneficial to his community. He says it is through the alliance with Israel that the Bedouins have begun to transcend the isolation created by their nomadic traditions.

== Published works ==
- 2010: A Shepherd's Journey: the story of Israel's first Bedouin diplomat. ISBN 978-965-555-473-1
