= Sun Bay =

2025 Israeli documentary film

- Official English-language film poster
- Directed by: Ido Weisman
- Written by: Ido Weisman; Ayala Bengad
- Produced by: Hadar Hasina Masasa
- Cinematography: Ido Weisman
- Edited by: Ayala Bengad
- Music by: Ophir Leibovitch
- Release date: May 23, 2025
- Running time: 70 minutes
- Country: Israel
- Language: Hebrew

Sun Bay (Hebrew: מפרץ השמש) is a 2025 Israeli documentary film directed and photographed by Ido Weisman. His feature-length directorial debut, the film follows three residents of a makeshift trailer park in Eilat, Israel, exploring loneliness, social isolation and the search for belonging.

The film premiered at the 2025 Docaviv International Documentary Film Festival, where it won the First Feature Award. In 2026, it won the Grand Prize for Best Documentary Feature at the Flickers' Rhode Island International Film Festival in the United States. It also received awards at the Israeli Documentary Forum Awards and the Moscow International Documentary Film Festival DOKer.

The film was nominated for Best Documentary Feature at the 2026 Ophir Awards.

== Synopsis ==
Set in Eilat, a resort city on Israel's southern coast, The film follows three residents living in a trailer park near the city's luxury hotels: Eliezer, a longtime resident seeking to reconnect with his father and family; Amir, a military veteran experiencing post-traumatic stress disorder who hopes to rebuild his life; and Tova, an elderly immigrant from England living apart from her children and family.

As the residents face the possibility of eviction, the documentary examines their relationships, experiences of isolation and efforts to establish a sense of home.

== Production ==
In late 2020, director Ido Weisman travelled through southern Israel while searching for a subject for a new documentary. During his visit to Eilat, he encountered a makeshift trailer park known as Sun Bay.

Weisman became interested in the residents' experiences of loneliness and their decision to live outside conventional social structures. These themes became central to the film.

The film was directed and photographed by Weisman, edited by Ayala Bengad, and produced by Hadar Hasina Masasa. Its screenplay was written by Weisman and Bengad, with original music composed by Ophir Leibovitch.

== Release ==
Sun Bay had its world premiere at the Docaviv International Documentary Film Festival on 23 May 2025.

The film was broadcast on Israel's public television channel Kan 11 in January 2026 and was subsequently made available through Kan BOX and the broadcaster's YouTube channel.

== Awards and nominations ==
Year	Festival or ceremony	Award or category	Result
2025	Docaviv International Documentary Film Festival	First Feature Award	Won
2025	Israeli Documentary Forum Awards	Best First Feature	Won
2025	Israeli Documentary Forum Awards	Best Original Music – Ophir Leibovitch	Won
2025	Cinema South International Film Festival	Honorable Mention	Won
2026	Flickers' Rhode Island International Film Festival	Grand Prize for Best Documentary Feature	Won
2026	Moscow International Documentary Film Festival DOKer	Best Director – Ido Weisman	Won
2026	Ophir Awards	Best Documentary Feature	Nominated

== Reception ==
Writing for the Israeli news website Ynet, film critic Shmulik Duvdevani praised the documentary's portrayal of the trailer park residents and its examination of the relationship between physical shelter and emotional belonging.

In Haaretz, a review published during the Docaviv festival praised the film's intimate but unintrusive portrait of the trailer park's residents and rated it 3.5 out of 5. Writing in the same paper ahead of the Kan 11 broadcast, Gili Izikovitch described the film as a portrait of people pushed out of, or never part of, the normative social order, with Eilat's hotels serving as a pointedly symbolic backdrop to their isolation.
