= Ruth Calderon =

Israeli academic and politician

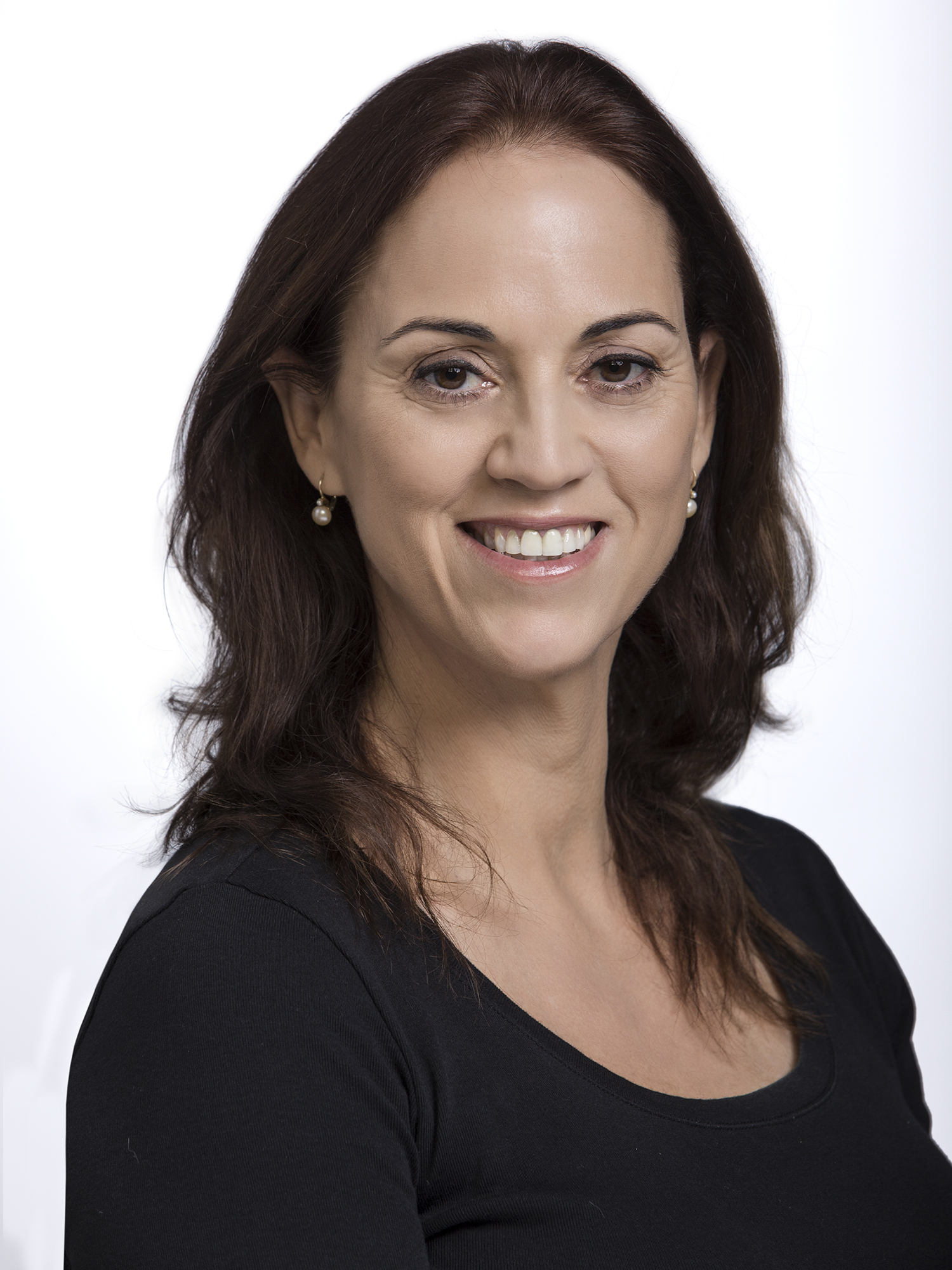

Faction represented in the Knesset
- 2013–2015: Yesh Atid

Personal details
- Born: 25 September 1961 (age 64) Tel Aviv, Israel

Ruth Calderon (Hebrew: רות קלדרון; born 25 September 1961) is an Israeli academic and politician. She served as a member of Knesset for Yesh Atid between 2013 and 2015.

== Biography ==
Ruth Calderon was born in Tel Aviv to a Sephardic father who emigrated to British controlled Mandatory Palestine from Bulgaria and an Ashkenazi mother originally from Germany. She grew up in what she describes as "a very Jewish, very Zionist, secular-traditional-religious home that combined Ashkenaz and Sepharad, Betar and Hashomer Hatzair," and attended public schools.

She earned a BA at Oranim Academic College and the University of Haifa, and went on to earn her MA and Ph.D. degrees in Talmud from the Hebrew University of Jerusalem. In 1989, she established the first Israeli secular, pluralistic and egalitarian Beth Midrash for women and men. In 1996 she founded ALMA, which seeks to acquaint secular Israelis with Hebrew culture. She hosted a TV show on Channel 2 that invited guests to discuss classic and modern Jewish texts.

Calderon has three children.

== Political career ==
In 2012 Calderon joined the new Yesh Atid party, and was placed thirteenth on the party's list for the 2013 elections. She subsequently became a Knesset member after the party won 19 seats. Her initial speech on the floor of the Knesset included personal anecdotes and talmudic quotations in a plea for mutual understanding and respect, and became a YouTube sensation. She was placed fifteenth on the party's list for the 2015 elections, and lost her seat as Yesh Atid were reduced to eleven seats.

MK Yair Lapid nominated Calderon to be the president of the WZO in November 2020, making her the first woman president or chair of a major Zionist organization.

== Awards and recognition ==
Calderon has been recognized for her scholastic achievements and civic leadership. Awards have included: the Avi Chai Prize for Jewish Education, the Samuel Rothberg Prize for Jewish Education, and honorary degrees from Brandeis, JTS, Hebrew College in Boston, and the Reconstructionist Rabbinical College.

== Books ==
Dr. Calderon is the author of, among other works, "A Bride for One Night" published by the University of Nebraska Press as a Jewish Publication Society book, English Translation (C) 2014 by the Deborah Harris Agency, original Hebrew edition, Hashuk, Habayit, Halev, (C) 2001. https://jps.org/books/bride-for-one-night/
