= Zvulun (name) =

Zvulun or Zevulun is both a given name and a surname.

Notable people with the given name include:

- Zevulun Hammer (1936–1998), Israeli politician
- Zvulun Kalfa (born 1962), Israeli politician
- Zvulun Lieberman (1930–2012), Israeli-American rabbi
- Zevulun Orlev (born 1945), Israeli politician

Notable people with the surname include:

- Tomer Zvulun (born 1976), Israeli stage director
