= Nofit =

Community settlement in northern Israel

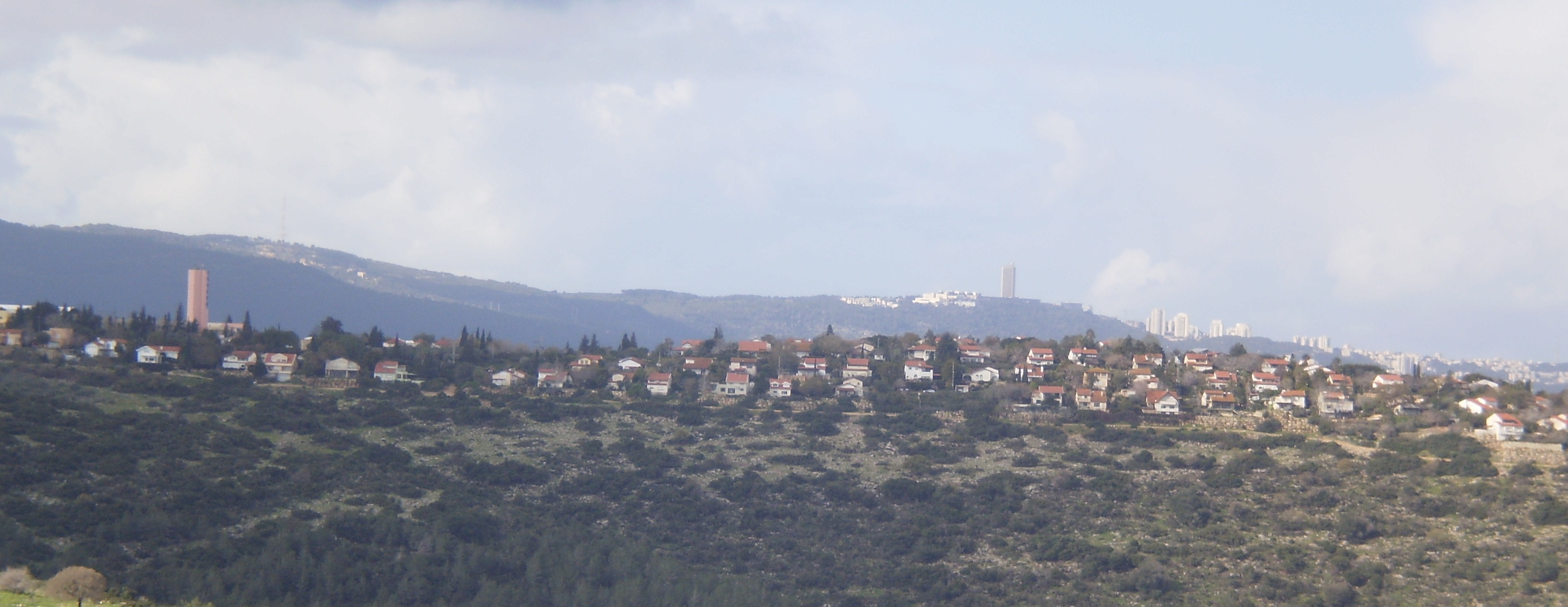

- Location within Haifa region of Israel
- Coordinates: 32°45′35″N 35°8′47″E
- Country: Israel
- District: Haifa
- Subdistrict: Haifa
- Council: Zevulun
- Founded: 9 November 1987
- Founder: Families from Haifa and HaKerayot
- Population (2024): 2,379
- Website: www.nofit.org.il

Nofit (Hebrew: נוֹפִית, lit. 'Scenic') is a community settlement in northern Israel. Located in the Lower Galilee, it falls under the jurisdiction of Zevulun Regional Council. In 2024 it had a population of 2,379.

== History ==
The beginnings of the village were with a group of eight families from Haifa and the Kerayot who were interested in establishing a community settlement in the Galilee. The initiator of the idea and the organizer of the group was architect Tzibi Springer who planned the village with a sustainable vision. The initiative was co-ordinated with the state, who approved the idea in 1982. Work on the infrastructure began in 1984, whilst the building of homes began in April 1986. The first residents (179 families) moved in on 9 November 1987. The village was initially named Pi Ner after Ludwig Piner, the head of the Rassco construction company, though it was later changed to Nofit.
