= Kfar Hasidim =

Moshav in northern Israel

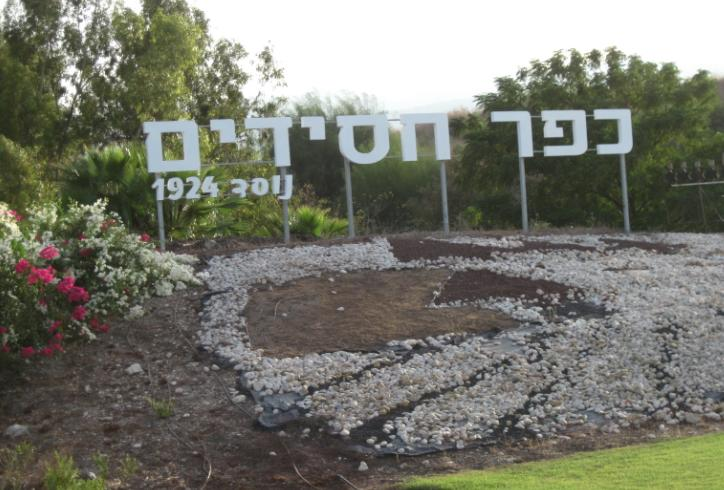

- Location within Haifa region of Israel Location within Israel
- Coordinates: 32°44′36″N 35°5′37″E
- Country: Israel
- District: Haifa
- Subdistrict: Haifa
- Council: Zevulun
- Founded: 1924
- Founder: Polish Jews
- Population (2024): 791

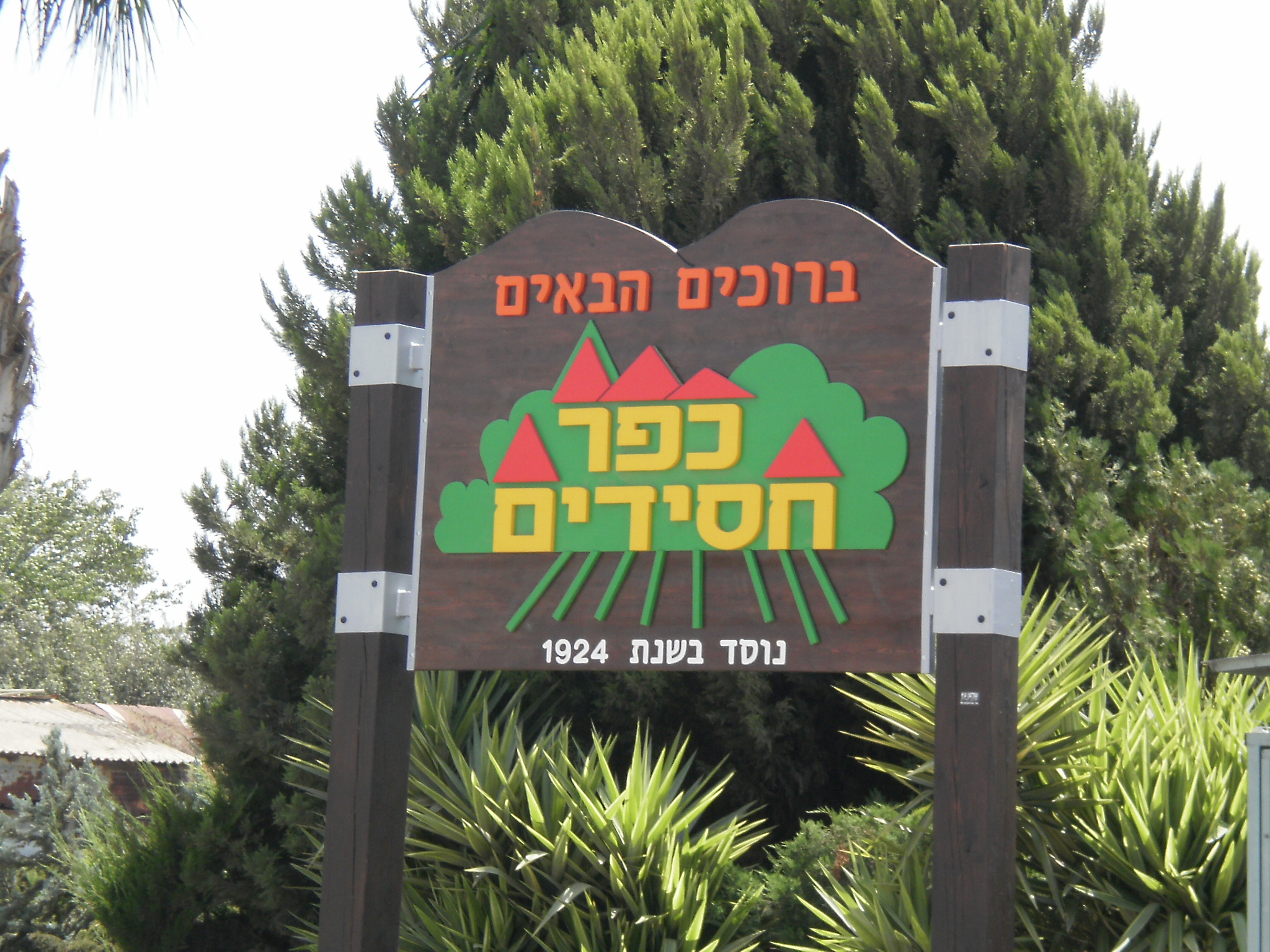
Entrance to Kfar Hasidim

Kfar Hasidim (Hebrew: כְּפַר חֲסִידִים, lit. 'Village of Hasidim'), also known as Kfar Hasidim Alef to distinguish it from Kfar Hasidim Bet, is a moshav in northern Israel. Located near Kiryat Ata, it falls under the jurisdiction of Zevulun Regional Council. In 2024 it had a population of 791.

== History ==
=== Harbaj village ===
During the Ottoman period there was a Muslim village called Harbaj at this place. In 1162 A.H. (~1748 CE) it was fortified by Daher al-Umar, and traces of the wall still existed in the late 19th century. The village appeared as El Harchieh on the map that Pierre Jacotin compiled in 1799.

In 1875, Victor Guérin found here about 30 inhabited houses. In the centre of the village was a large well, partly filled. In 1881, the Palestine Exploration Fund's Survey of Western Palestine described El Harbaj as "a small adobe village, on the plain, with a well to the north and olives to the east." A population list from about 1887 showed that el Harbaj had about 75 inhabitants; all Muslims.

In the 1922 census of Palestine conducted by the British Mandate authorities, Harbaj had a population 177, all Muslims.

==== Kfar Hasidim ====
Kfar Hasidim was founded in 1924 by two groups of Polish Hasidic immigrants of the Fourth Aliyah, followers of Rabbi Yehezkel Taub and Rabbi Israel Hoffstein, the rabbis of Yablono and Kozienice. They bought land east of Haifa Bay with the help of Rabbi Yeshayahu Shapira of Hapoel Hamizrachi and established Nahalat Ya’akov and Avodat Yisrael, which later merged into Kfar Hasidim.

In 1925 the Palestine Jewish Colonization Association purchased 70 feddans in Harbaj from Alexander Sursuk, as part of a larger series of land purchases from the Sursuk family of Beirut. At the time, there were 50 families living there. From 1931, and lasting several years, the Jewish Agency struggled to evict the tenant farmers from Harbaj, from the land which was to become Kfar Hasidim.

In the 1931 census, Kfar Hassidim had a population of 420, all Jews, in a total of 104 houses. By the 1945 statistics, Kfar Hasidim had 980 residents, all Jewish.

In 1935, Makhouly visited Tal Harbaj on behalf of the Department of Antiquities. He noted that: "the portion of the outer wall on the eastern top of the site was demolished and all stones from it were taken away."

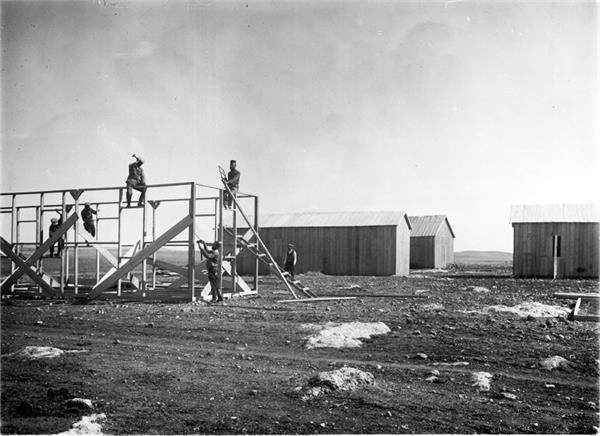
Kfar Hasidim first houses 1925

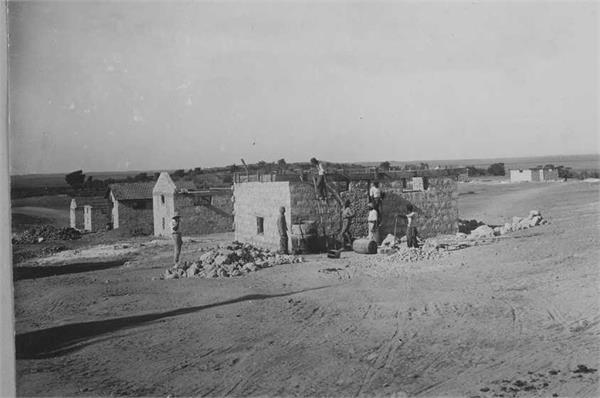
Kfar Hasidim 1925

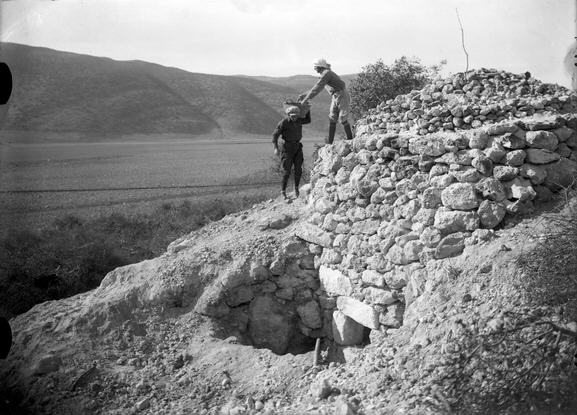
Kfar Hasidim lime kiln 1925

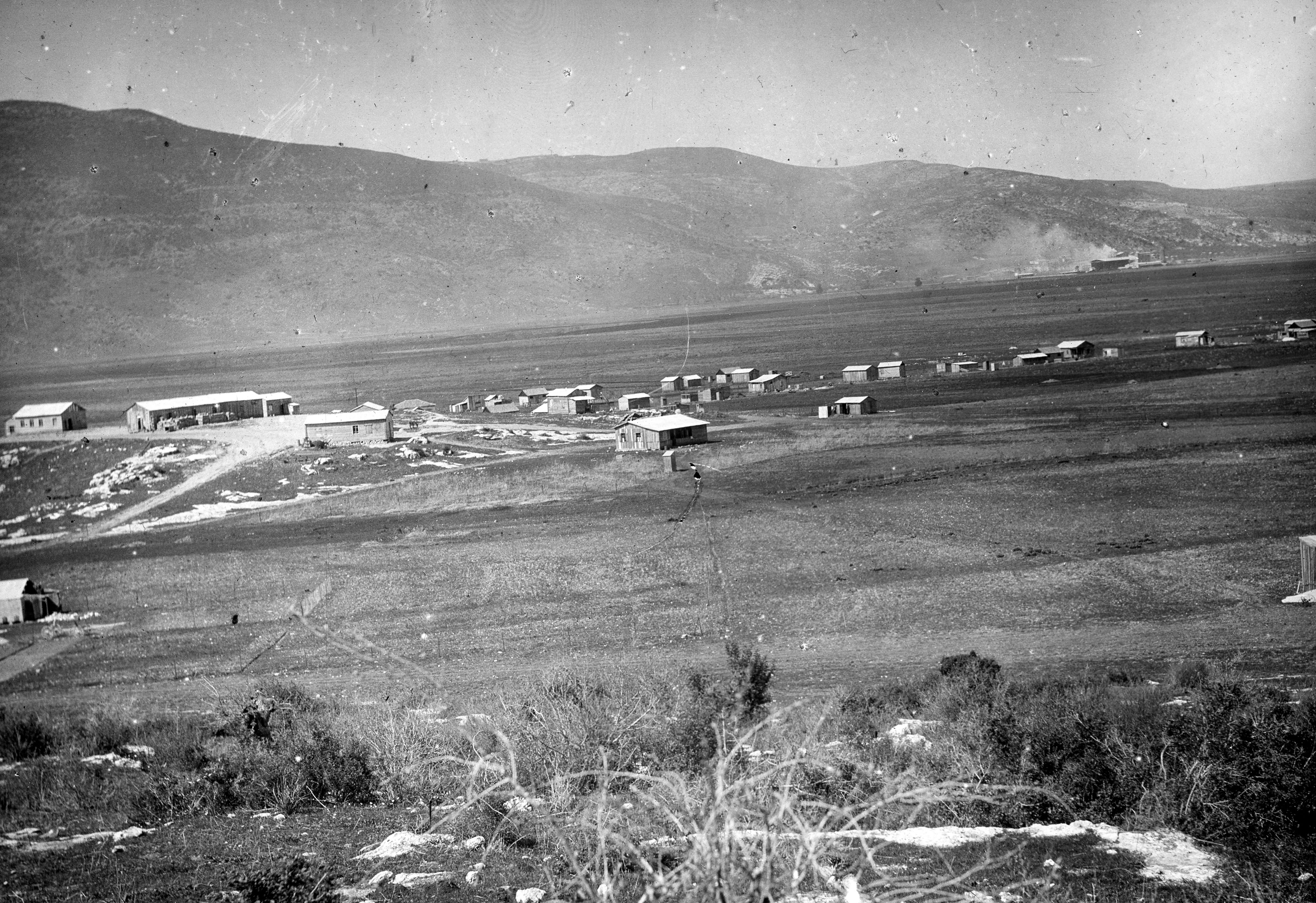
Nahalat Ya'akov, 1926

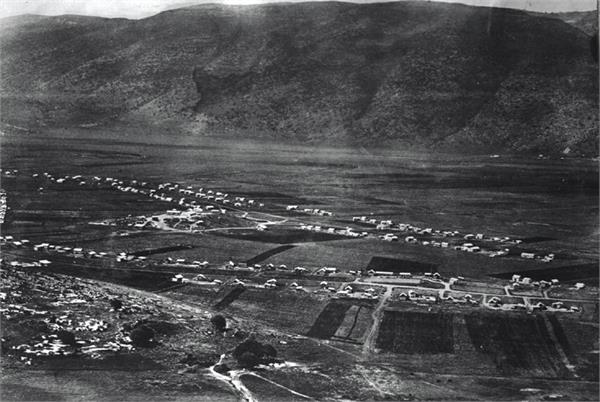
Kfar Hasidim 1929

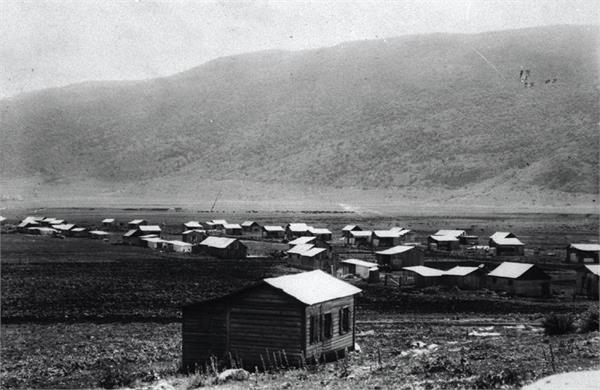
Kfar Hasidim 1930

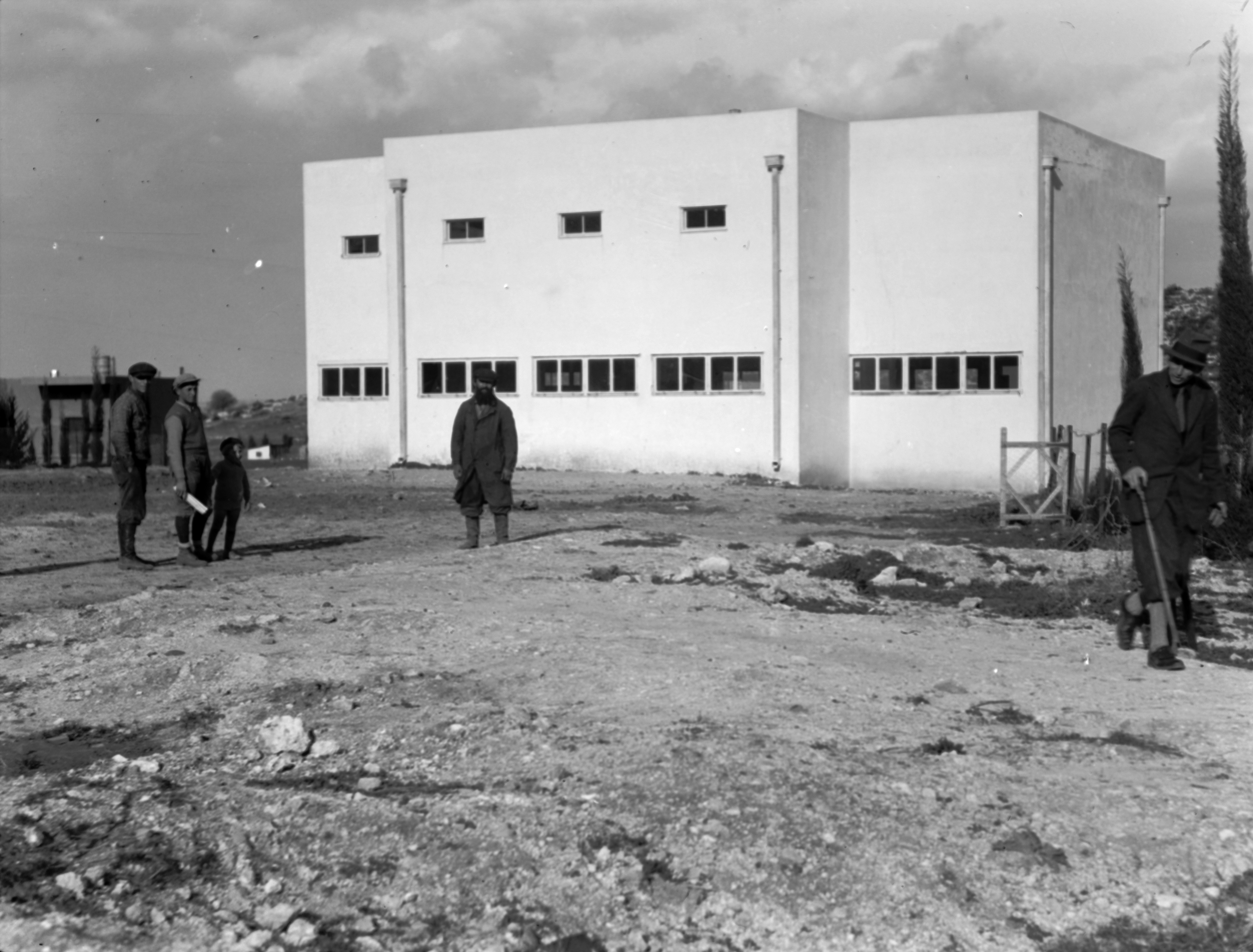
Kfar Hasidim synagogue, 1934-1939

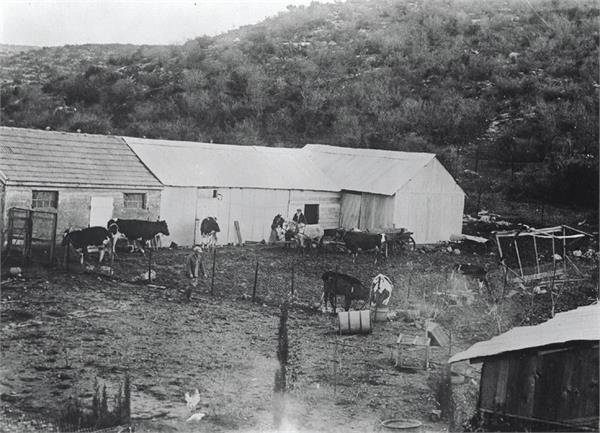
Kfar Hasidim 1937

=== State of Israel ===
In 1950, Kfar Hasidim Bet was established nearby by non-agricultural residents of Kfar Hasidim.

Kfar HaNoar HaDati youth village, founded in 1937, lies adjacent to the moshav. Yityish Titi Aynaw, an Ethiopian Jew who won the Miss Israel beauty pageant in 2013, was a graduate of the school.

The immigrant absorption center in Kfar Hasidim is the first stop for members of the Bnei Menashe community from North-Eastern India who settle in Israel.

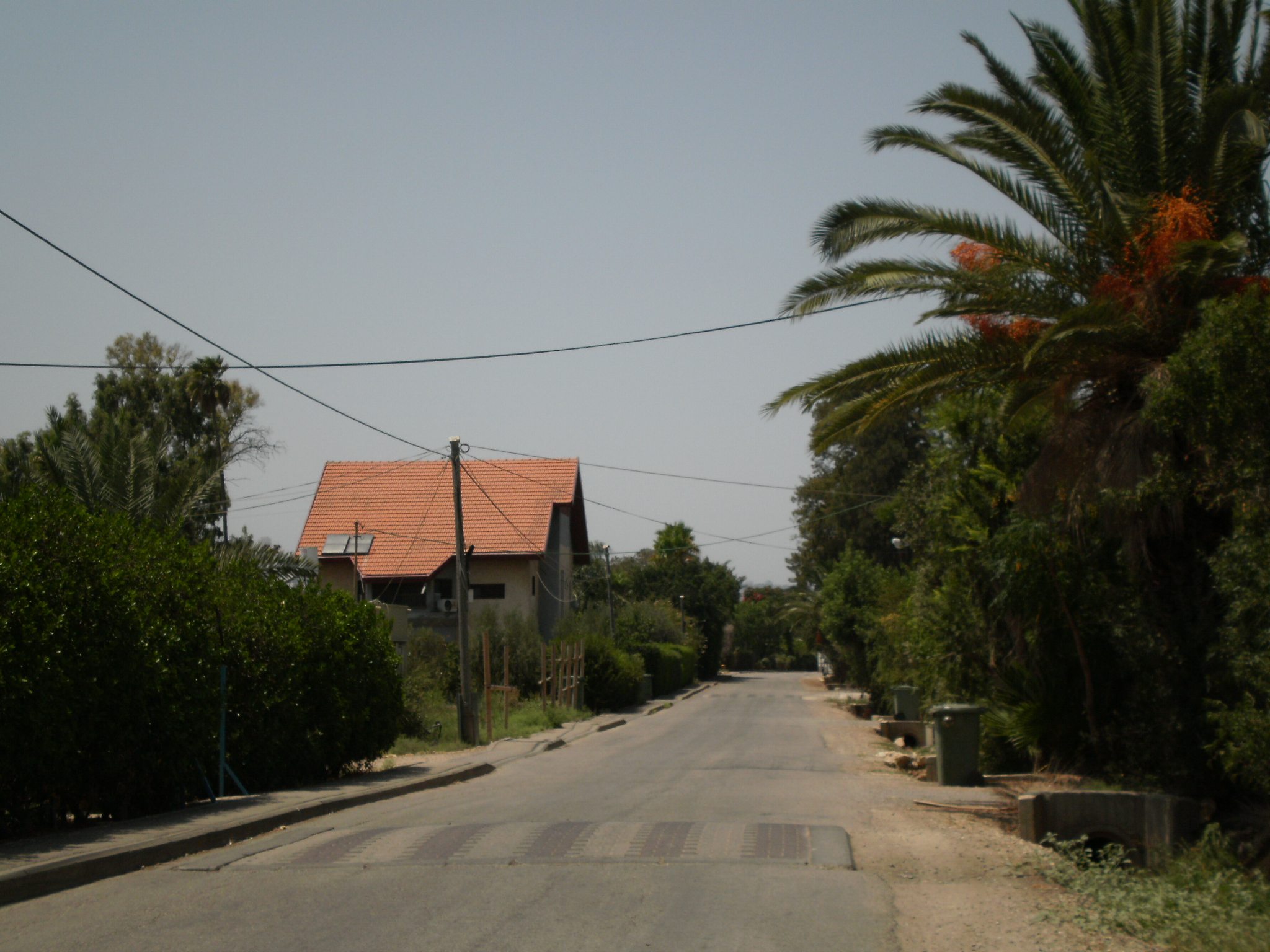
Street in Kfar Hasidim

== Prominent residents ==
Shlomo Goren, future head of the Military Rabbinate of the Israel Defense Forces and subsequently Ashkenazi Chief Rabbi of Israel from 1973 to 1983, was raised in Kfar Hasidim, which his father helped to found.

== Bibliography ==
- Avneri, Arieh L. (1984). The Claim of Dispossession: Jewish Land-settlement and the Arabs, 1878-1948. Transaction Publishers. ISBN 0-87855-964-7.
- Barron, J.B., ed. (1923). Palestine: Report and General Abstracts of the Census of 1922. Government of Palestine.
- Conder, C.R.; Kitchener, H.H. (1882). The Survey of Western Palestine: Memoirs of the Topography, Orography, Hydrography, and Archaeology. Vol. 2. London: Committee of the Palestine Exploration Fund.
- Department of Statistics (1945). Village Statistics, April, 1945. Government of Palestine.
- Guérin, V. (1880). Description Géographique Historique et Archéologique de la Palestine (in French). Vol. 3: Galilee, pt. 1. Paris: L'Imprimerie Nationale.
- Hadawi, S. (1970). Village Statistics of 1945: A Classification of Land and Area ownership in Palestine. Palestine Liberation Organization Research Center. Archived from the original on 2018-12-08.
- Karmon, Y. (1960). "An Analysis of Jacotin's Map of Palestine" (PDF). Israel Exploration Journal. 10 (3, 4): 155–173, 244–253. Archived from the original (PDF) on 2018-09-05.
- Mills, E., ed. (1932). Census of Palestine 1931. Population of Villages, Towns and Administrative Areas. Jerusalem: Government of Palestine.
- Palmer, E.H. (1881). The Survey of Western Palestine: Arabic and English Name Lists Collected During the Survey by Lieutenants Conder and Kitchener, R. E. Transliterated and Explained by E.H. Palmer. Committee of the Palestine Exploration Fund.
- Petersen, Andrew (2001). A Gazetteer of Buildings in Muslim Palestine (British Academy Monographs in Archaeology). Vol. I. Oxford University Press. ISBN 978-0-19-727011-0.
- Schumacher, G. (1888). "Population list of the Liwa of Akka". Quarterly Statement - Palestine Exploration Fund. 20: 169–191.
