= Zvulun Lieberman =

American rabbi

Zvulun (Sidney Z.) Lieberman (1930–December 16, 2012) served as spiritual leader of Congregation Beth Torah in Brooklyn, New York, for half a century and was a Rosh Yeshiva at Yeshiva University. He was also a principal at the Yeshivah of Flatbush High School in the late 1960s.

He graduated from Yeshiva College in 1951, RIETS in 1954 and the Ferkauf Graduate School of Psychology in 1959.

He died on 16 December 2012 (2 Tevet 5773) and was buried in Israel next to his son, Rabbi Hillel Lieberman.
