= Zevulun Regional Council =

Coordinates: 32.795°N 35.115°E

Zevulun זבולון
- Regional council (from 1950)
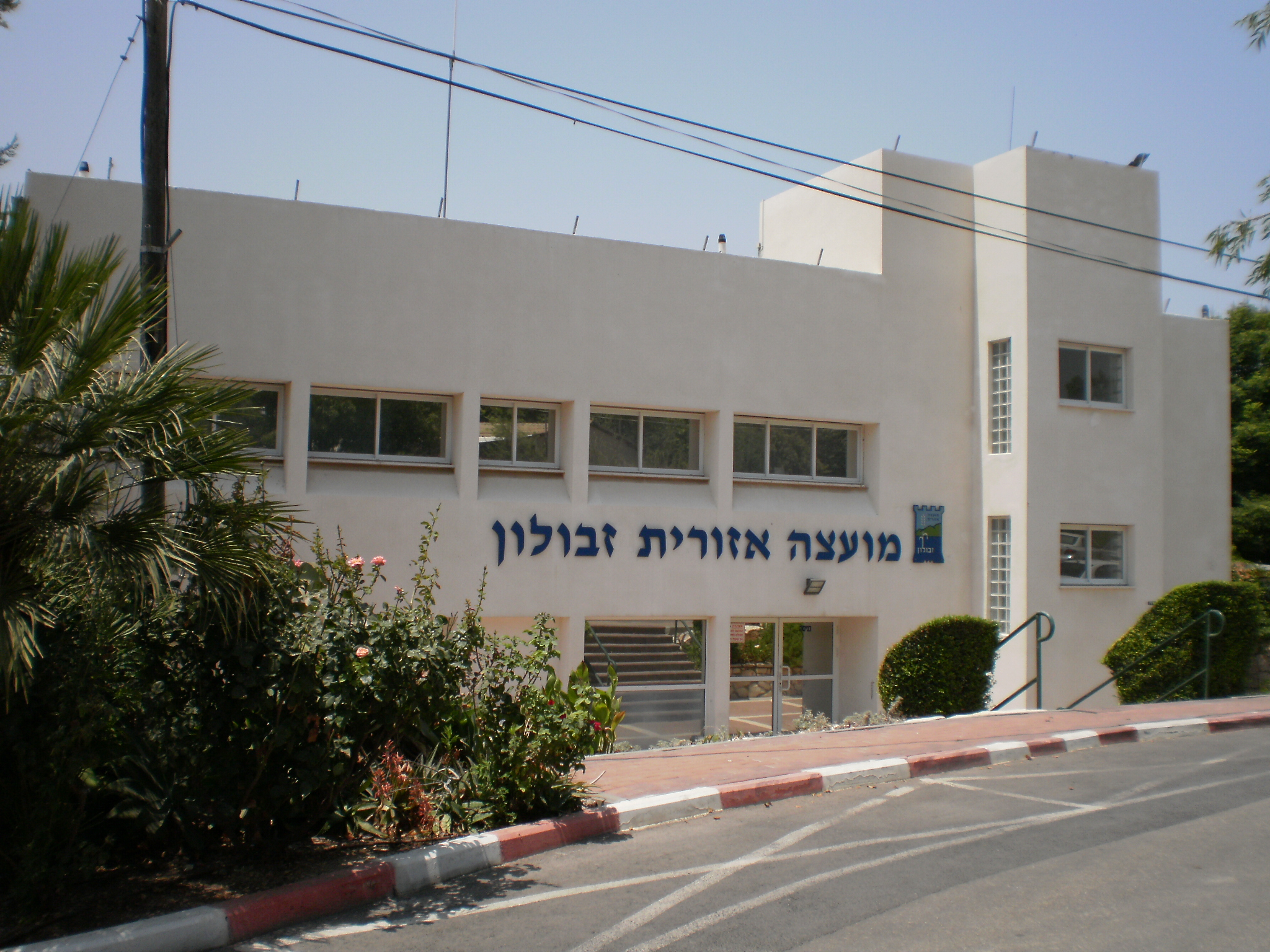
- Interactive map of Zevulun
- Country: Israel
- District: Haifa
- Subdistrict: Haifa

Government
  - Head of Municipality: Amos Netzer

Area
  - Total: 62,820 dunams (62.82 km^{2}; 24.25 sq mi)

Population (2024)
  - Total: 13,137
  - Density: 209.1/km^{2} (541.6/sq mi)
- Website: Official website

Zevulun Regional Council (Hebrew: מועצה אזורית זבולון, Mo'atza Azorit Zvulun) is a regional council in the Haifa District of Israel. Founded in 1950, it had a population of 13,137 in 2024.

The council borders Mateh Asher Regional Council to the north, Jezreel Valley Regional Council and Shefa-'Amr to the east, Carmel Nature Reserve national park and Kiryat Tiv'on to the south and HaKerayot to the west.

== Name ==
The name is derived from the Hebrew name "Emek Zevulun", lit. "Zebulun Valley", given by Zionist pioneers to the coastal area stretching along the Bay of Acre, from Acre (Akko) to Haifa, on the incorrect assumption that the tribe of Zebulun once had its territory in this area – this land was part of the allotment of Asher, and is a coastal plain, not a valley.

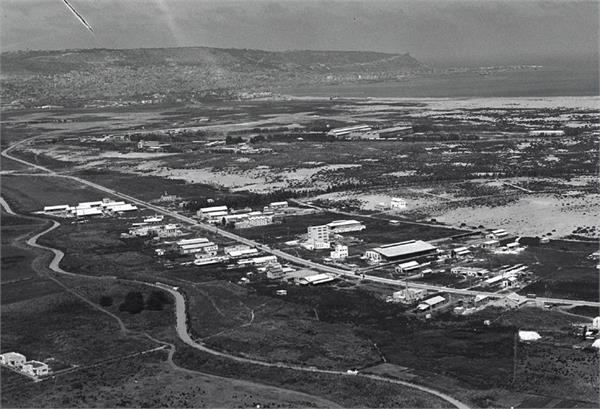
Zevulun industrial zone 1939

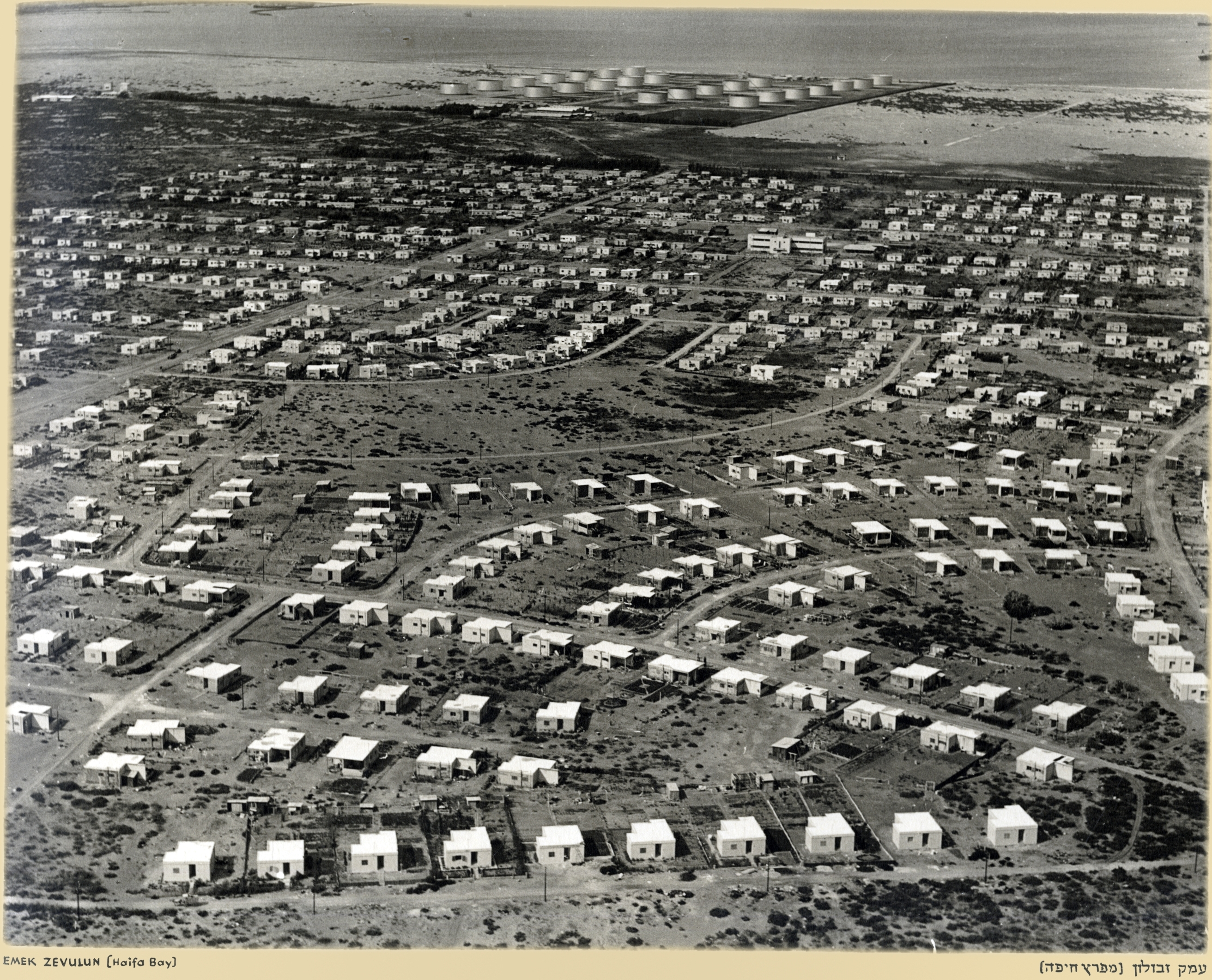
Zevulun housing 1937

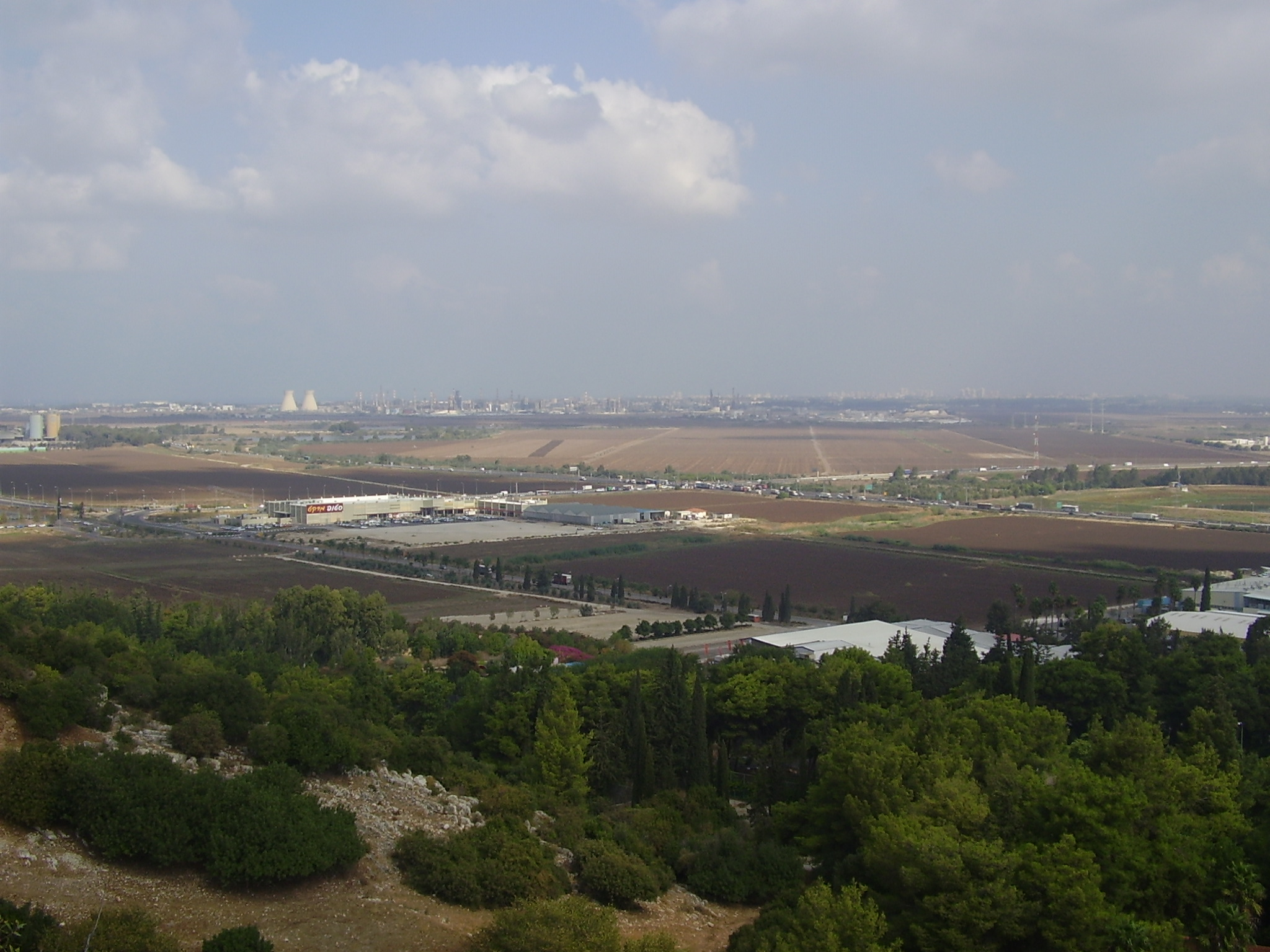
Zevulun Valley

== List of communities ==
Kibbutzim

- Kfar HaMaccabi
- Ramat Yohanan
- Sha'ar HaAmakim
- Usha
- Yagur

Moshavim

- Kfar Bialik
- Kfar Hasidim Alef

Communal settlements

- Kfar Hasidim Bet
- Nofit

Arab villages

- Ibtin
- Khawaled
- Ras Ali

Other villages

- Kfar HaNoar HaDati
- Oranim

== Demographics ==
Historical population
Year	Pop.	±%
1972	4,600	—
1983	5,400	+17.4%
1995	6,800	+25.9%
2008	11,220	+65.0%
2022	13,401	+19.4%
2024	13,137	−2.0%
