= Haifa District =

District of Israel

Coordinates: 32°35′N 35°00′E

- District of Israel

transcription(s)
  - Hebrew: מחוז חיפה

transcription(s)
  - Arabic: منطقة حيفا
- Interactive map of Haifa District
- Cities: 11
- Local Councils: 14
- Regional Councils: 4
- Capital: Haifa

Government
  - District Commissioner: Fayez Hanah

Area
  - Total: 864 km^{2} (334 sq mi)

Population (2024)
  - Total: 1,159,594
  - Density: 1,340/km^{2} (3,480/sq mi)
- ISO 3166 code: IL-HA

Haifa District (Hebrew: מחוז חיפה; Arabic: منطقة حيفا) is an administrative district surrounding the city of Haifa in Israel. The district is one of the seven administrative districts of Israel, and its capital is Haifa. The district land area is 864 km^{2} (299.3 mi^{2}), and its population as of 2024 is 1,159,594.

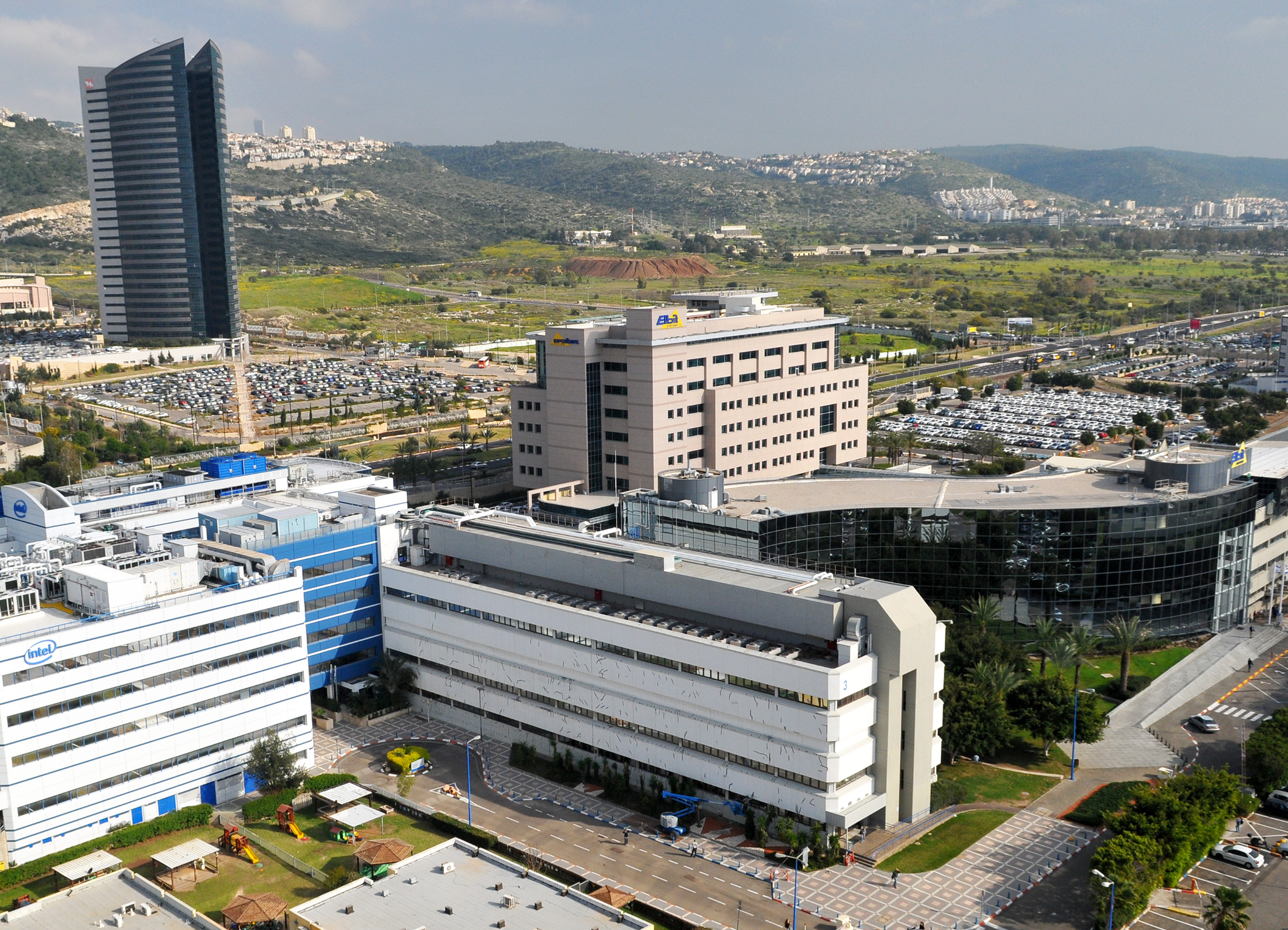
Haifa

== Demographics ==
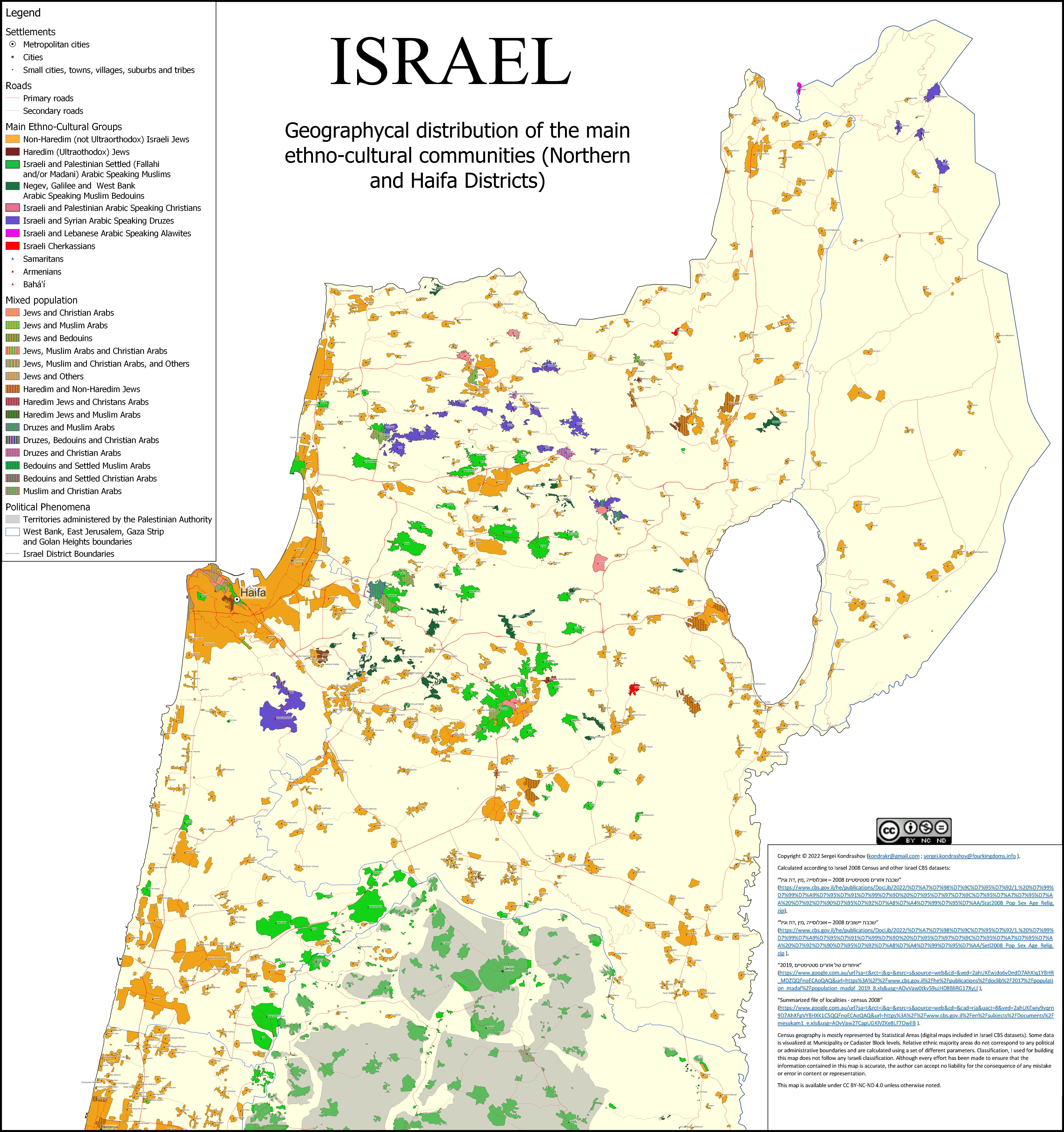
Geographical distribution of the main ethno-cultural communities Haifa and Northern districts

Historical population
Year	Pop.	±%
1972	462,500	—
1983	541,400	+17.1%
1995	695,900	+28.5%
2008	887,370	+27.5%
2022	1,104,049	+24.4%
2024	1,159,594	+5.0%

According to the Israeli Central Bureau of Statistics data for 2024:

- Total population: 1,159,594
- Ethnic:
  - Jews: 855,443 (73.8%)
  - Arabs: 286,990 (24.8%)
  - Others: 17,161 (1.5%)
- Religious (as of 2022):
  - Jews: 66.8%
  - Muslims: 20.6%
  - Druze: 2.5%
  - Christians: 2.6%
  - Not classified: 7.5%

== Administrative local authorities ==
Subdistricts and Natural Regions
Haifa (Natural regions: Haifa (coextensive with subdistrict)); Hadera (Natural regions: Alexander Mountain · Hadera · Karmel Coast · Zikhron Ya'akov)
Cities	Local Councils	Regional Councils
Baqa al-Gharbiyye; Hadera; Haifa; Harish; Kiryat Ata; Kiryat Bialik; Kiryat Motzkin; Kiryat Yam; Nesher; Or Akiva; Tirat Carmel; Umm al-Fahm	Ar'ara; Basma; Binyamina-Giv'at Ada; Daliyat al-Karmel; Fureidis; Isfiya; Jatt; Jisr az-Zarqa; Kafr Qara; Kiryat Tivon; Ma'ale Iron; Pardes Hanna-Karkur; Rekhasim; Zikhron Ya'akov	Alona; Hof HaCarmel; Menashe; Zevulun

== See also ==
- Districts of Israel
- List of cities in Israel
- Arab localities in Israel
- Wadi Ara
