= Haifa Subdistrict =

Haifa subdistrict נפת חיפה قضاء حيفا
- Subdistrict
- Interactive map of Haifa subdistrict
- Country: Israel
- District: Haifa

Area
  - Total: 294 km^{2} (114 sq mi)

Population (2024)
  - Total: 634,396

Ethnicity
  - Jews and others: 85.9%
  - Arabs: 12.3%

The Haifa Subdistrict is one of Israel's sub-districts in Haifa District. The Subdistrict is composed of mostly of the Northern half of the historical Mandatory Haifa Subdistrict.

The Haifa Natural Region is coextensive with the Haifa Subdistrict.

== Demographics ==
Historical population
Year	Pop.	±%
1972	353,000	—
1983	400,200	+13.4%
1995	479,600	+19.8%
2008	531,720	+10.9%
2022	610,708	+14.9%
2024	634,396	+3.9%

== Administrative local authorities ==
Cities	Local Councils	Regional Councils
Haifa; Kiryat Ata; Kiryat Bialik; Kiryat Motzkin; Kiryat Yam; Nesher; Tirat Carmel	Daliyat al-Karmel; Isfiya; Kiryat Tivon; Rekhasim	Zevulun

== Voting Patterns ==
In the 2022 election, 51 percent of voters in the subdistrict voted for the parties of the center-left coalition led by Yair Lapid, while 43 percent voted for the parties of the right-wing coalition led by Benjamin Netanyahu and 6 percent voted for the Arab parties.

In the 2026 election, 51 percent of voters in the subdistrict voted for the parties of the center-left coalition led by Gadi Eisenkot, while 38 percent voted for the parties of the right-wing coalition led by Benjamin Netanyahu and 6 percent voted for the Arab parties. An additional 2.9 percent voted for the Reservists, and 1.5 percent voted for Amcha Yisrael. Voter turnout increased 19 percent from the 2022 election.
