= List of Druze =

The list of Druze includes prominent Druze figures who are notable in their areas of expertise.

== Literature ==
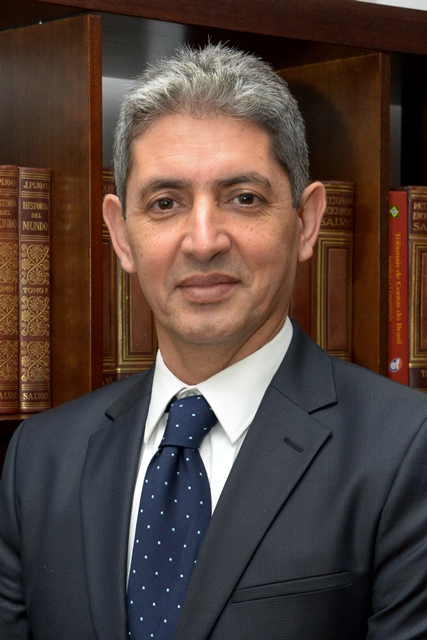
Reda Mansour, Israeli Hebrew poet, writer, and Ambassador

- Naim Araidi – Israeli writer and poet in Hebrew and Arabic, Israeli Ambassador to Norway.
- Emin Arslan – born in current-day Lebanon (Ottoman Syria), diplomat, writer, and editor
- Suliman Bashear – Israeli scholar, writer, and professor
- Sami Makarem – Lebanese-American writer, painter, and scholar
- Reda Mansour – Israeli Hebrew poet and writer and former Israeli ambassador to Ecuador, Brazil, and Panama.
- Salman Masalha – Israeli poet, essayist, translator, and researcher
- Salman Natour – Israeli writer, journalist, and playwright.
- Samih al-Qasim – Israeli poet.
- Rami Zeedan – Israeli political scientist, historian, professor, and author.

== Media ==
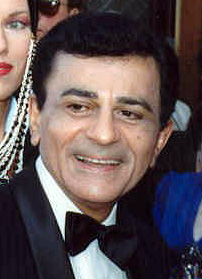
Casey Kasem, American TV and radio presenter

- Raghida Dergham – Lebanese-American journalist.
- Mona Abou Hamza – Lebanese TV presenter
- Casey Kasem – American TV and radio presenter (notably American Top 40) and actor, of Lebanese descent.
- Gadeer Mreeh – Israeli journalist and politician, member of the Israeli Knesset, anchor of Hebrew-language news program on Israeli television.
- Nahida Nakad – Lebanese-Italian senior correspondent, TV executive, and author; former Editorial Director of FRANCE 24 TV station and Monte Carlo Doualiya Arabic language radio
- Faisal al-Qassem – Syrian television talkshow host of The Opposite Direction on Al Jazeera, based in Qatar

== Military ==
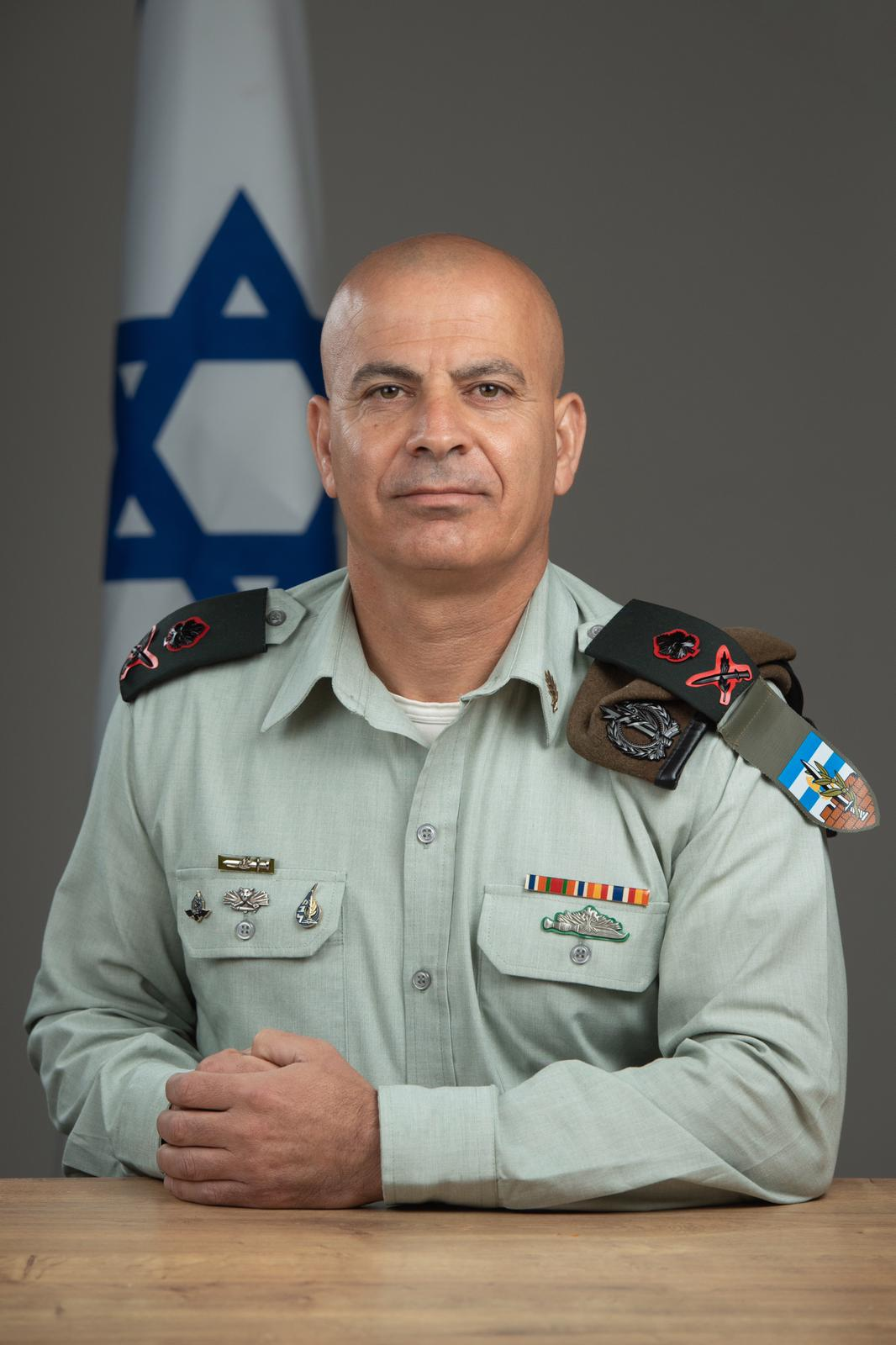
Ghassan Alian

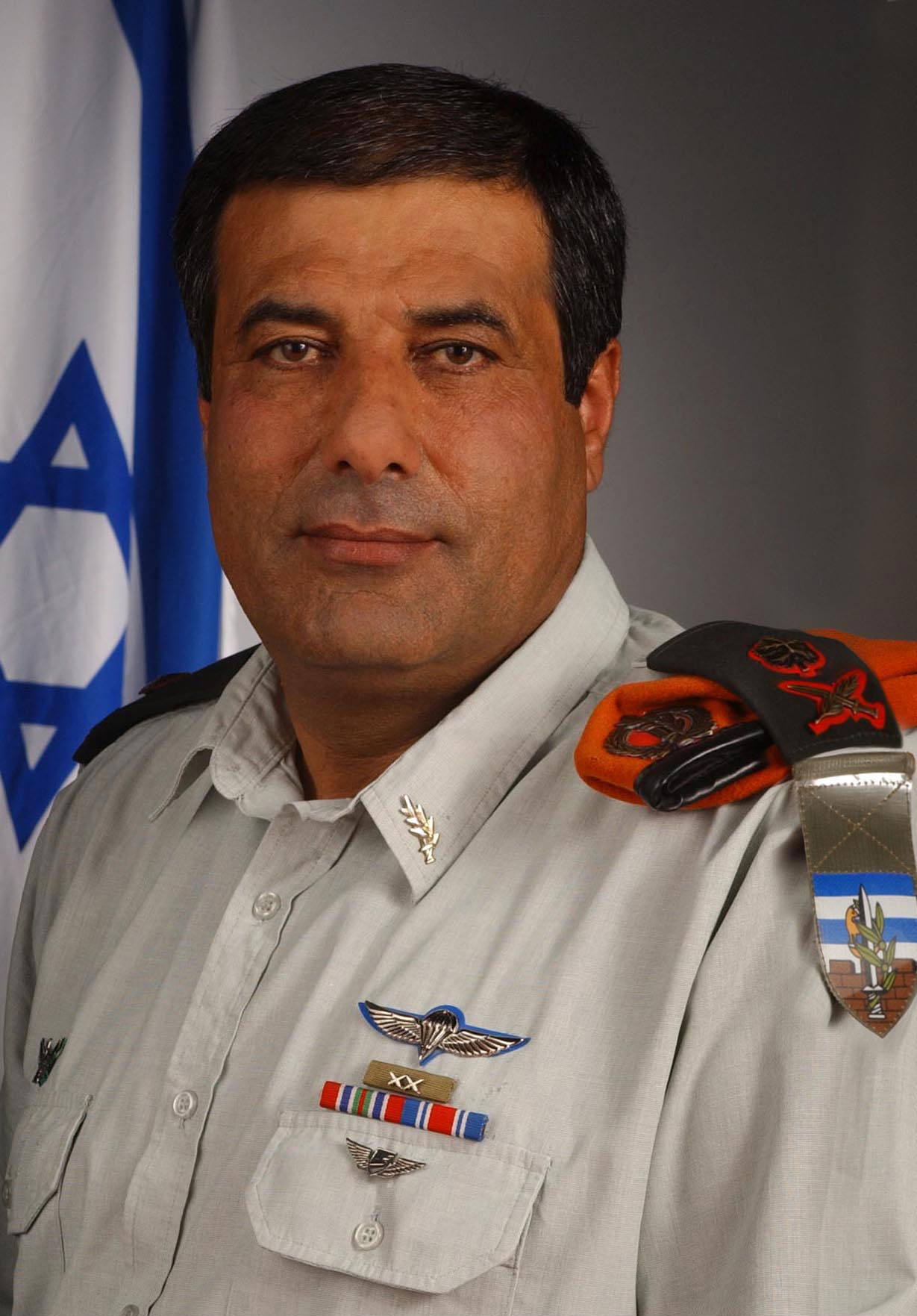
Yusef Mishleb

- Alim Abdallah – Israeli deputy commander of the IDF 401st Brigade of the 91st Division, lieutenant colonel.
- Ehsan Daxa – Israeli commander of the IDF 401st Armored Brigade, colonel.
- Ghassan Alian – Israeli commander of the IDF Golani Brigade, head of the Coordinator of Government Activities in the Territories.
- Imad Fares – Israeli Brigadier General, commander of the IDF Givati Brigade, commander of 91st Division
- Issam Zahreddine – Major General of the Syrian Republican Guard who has played a major role in the Syrian Civil War, leading Syrian Government forces on several fronts.
- Salman Habaka – Israeli commander of the IDF 188th Armored Brigade's 53rd Battalion killed in action during the Gaza war
- Salim Hatoum – Syrian Major. Led overthrow of the government of Amin al-Hafez in 1966.
- Yousef Mishleb – Israeli general; commander of the IDF Etzion Regional Brigade, commander of the Edom Division, Coordinator of Government Activities in the Territories, and commander of the Home Front Command.
- Nada Nadim Prouty – Lebanese intelligence professional who worked with the FBI and CIA in counter-terrorism
- Salman Zarka – Israeli physician and current Director of Ziv Medical Center in Safed; Israel Defense Forces Colonel, senior lecturer at the Haifa University and the Hebrew University of Jerusalem.

== Entertainment ==
- Farid al-Atrash – Syrian male singer, composer, and actor.
- Asmahan (Amaal al-Atrash) – Syrian female singer and actress.
- Ramy Ayach – Lebanese singer
- Fahd Ballan – Syrian male singer.
- Loai Ali - Israeli singer and actor

== Politics ==
=== Canada ===
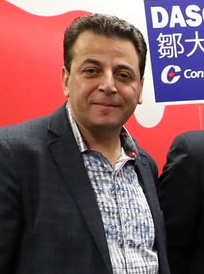
Ziad Aboultaif, Canadian MP

- Ziad Aboultaif – Canadian MP for Edmonton Manning.

=== Israel ===
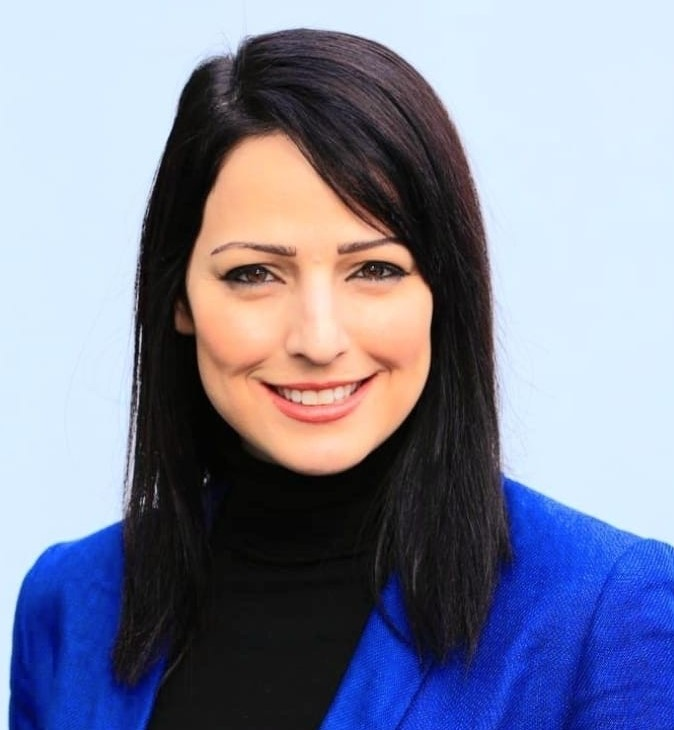
Gadeer Mreeh, Israeli journalist, tv anchor, and member of the Knesset

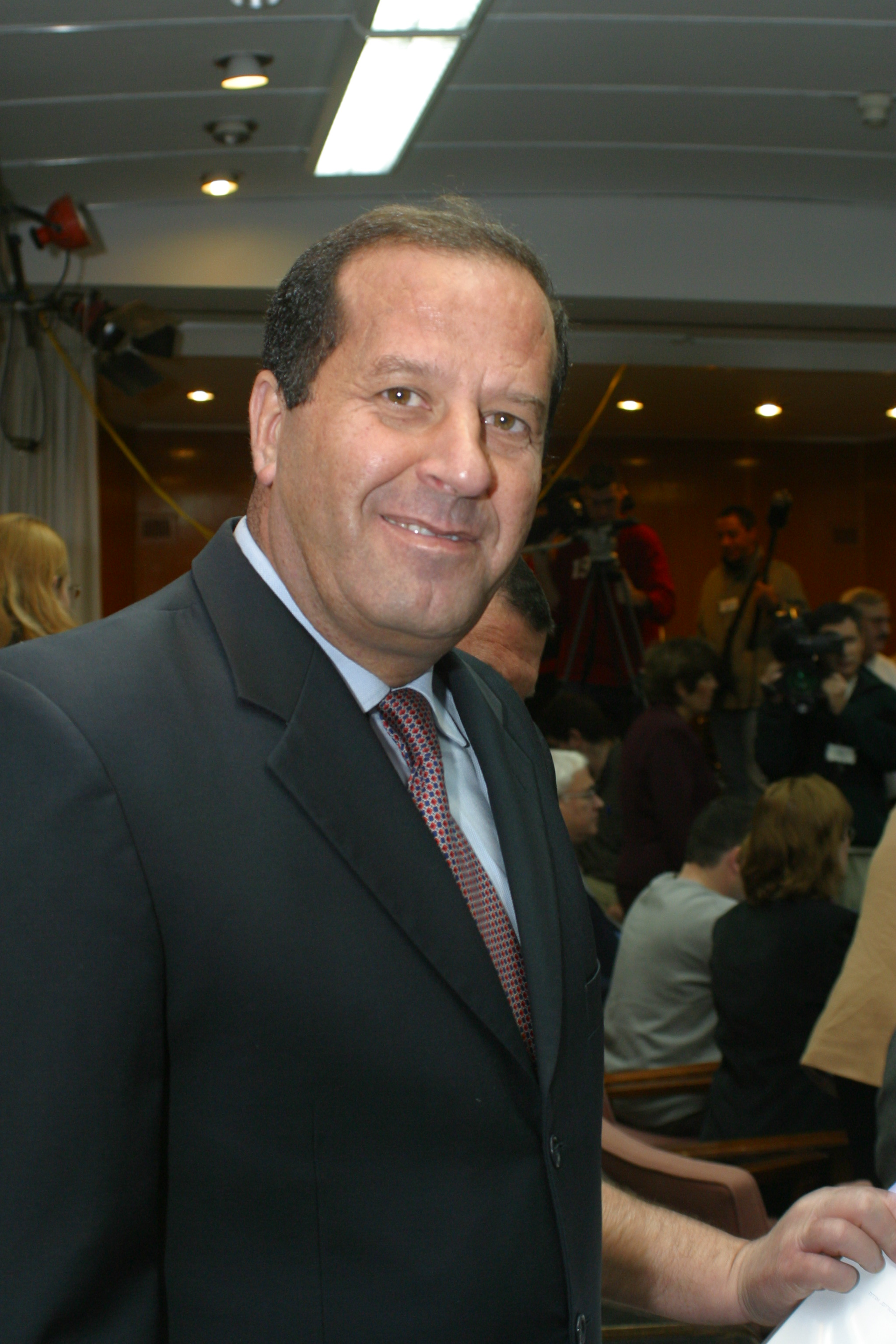
Majalli Wahabi, Israeli member of the Knesset, briefly President of Israel

- Labib Hussein Abu Rokan – Israeli MP and religious judge.
- Abdullah Abu Ma'aruf – Israeli MP and physician.
- Hamad Amar – Israeli MP.
- Naim Araidi – Israeli writer and poet in Hebrew and Arabic, Israeli Ambassador to Norway.
- Assad Assad – Israeli MP, army colonel, and diplomat
- Jabar Asakla – Israeli member of the Knesset, now secretary of the Hadash Party
- Zeidan Atashi – Israeli MP and diplomat
- Amal Nasser el-Din – Israeli MP and author, awarded the Israel Prize, the Prime Minister's Prize for the Commemoration of Fallen Soldiers, and the Yakir Haifa Award
- Salah-Hassan Hanifes – Israeli MP
- Akram Hasson – Israeli member of the Knesset, Kadima's leader, marking the first time a Druze had led a Jewish party.
- Ayoob Kara – Israeli MP, deputy speaker, Israeli Minister of Communications, Israeli Deputy Minister for Development.
- Reda Mansour – Israeli poet, historian, diplomat, Israeli Ambassador to Ecuador, Brazil, and Panama
- Jabr Moade – Israeli MP and deputy minister
- Gadeer Mreeh — Israeli journalist and member of the Knesset; anchor of a Hebrew-language news program on Israeli television.
- Fateen Mulla – Israeli member of the Knesset, Deputy Minister in the Prime Minister's Office.
- Mohamed Nafa – Israeli MP
- Said Nafa – Israeli MP and lawyer
- Shachiv Shnaan – Israeli member of parliament
- Salah Tarif – Israeli government minister, MP, and army captain
- Majalli Wahabi – Israeli member of the Knesset; briefly President of Israel, IDF lieutenant-colonel.

=== Jordan ===
- Ayman Safadi – Deputy Prime Minister and Jordan's Minister of Foreign Affairs.
- Rashid Talaa – First Prime Minister of Jordan.

=== Lebanon ===
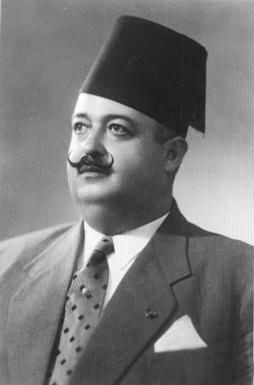
Majid Arslan, Lebanese Defense Minister

- Emin Arslan – born in current-day Lebanon (Ottoman Syria), diplomat, writer, and editor
- Akram Chehayeb – Lebanese Minister and MP
- Ghazi Aridi – Lebanese minister and MP
- Majid Arslan – Lebanese Defense Minister for over 40 years
- Shakib Arslan – Lebanese politician, writer, poet, and historian
- Talal Arslan – Lebanese minister and MP
- Fakhr-al-Din II – Ruler (emir) of Lebanon from 1590 to 1633; united Lebanon and parts of Syria and Palestine under his rule
- Kamal Jumblatt – Lebanese MP, minister, writer, author, and poet
- Walid Jumblatt – Lebanese minister and leader of the Progressive Socialist Party
- Marwan Hamadeh – Lebanese minister and MP
- Marwan Kheireddin – Lebanese minister
- Faisal Al Sayegh – Lebanese MP
- Wiam Wahhab – Lebanese politician

=== Syria ===
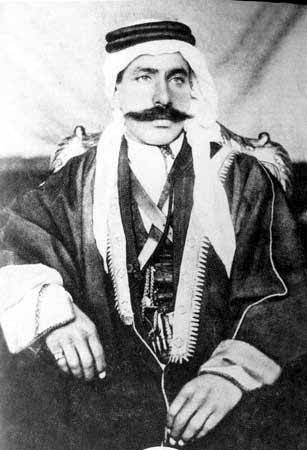
Sultan Pasha al-Atrash (1885–1982), commander of the Revolt of 1925

- Sultan Pasha al-Atrash – Syrian Leader and Commander of the Syrian Revolt of 1925.
- Mansur al-Atrash – Syrian politician, Interim head of state, journalist, founding member of the Ba'ath Party.
- Shibli al-Aysami – former Syrian Vice president and Gen Sec of the Ba'ath Arab Socialist Party

=== Venezuela ===
- Tarek El Aissami – Venezuelan interior and justice minister.

== Religion ==
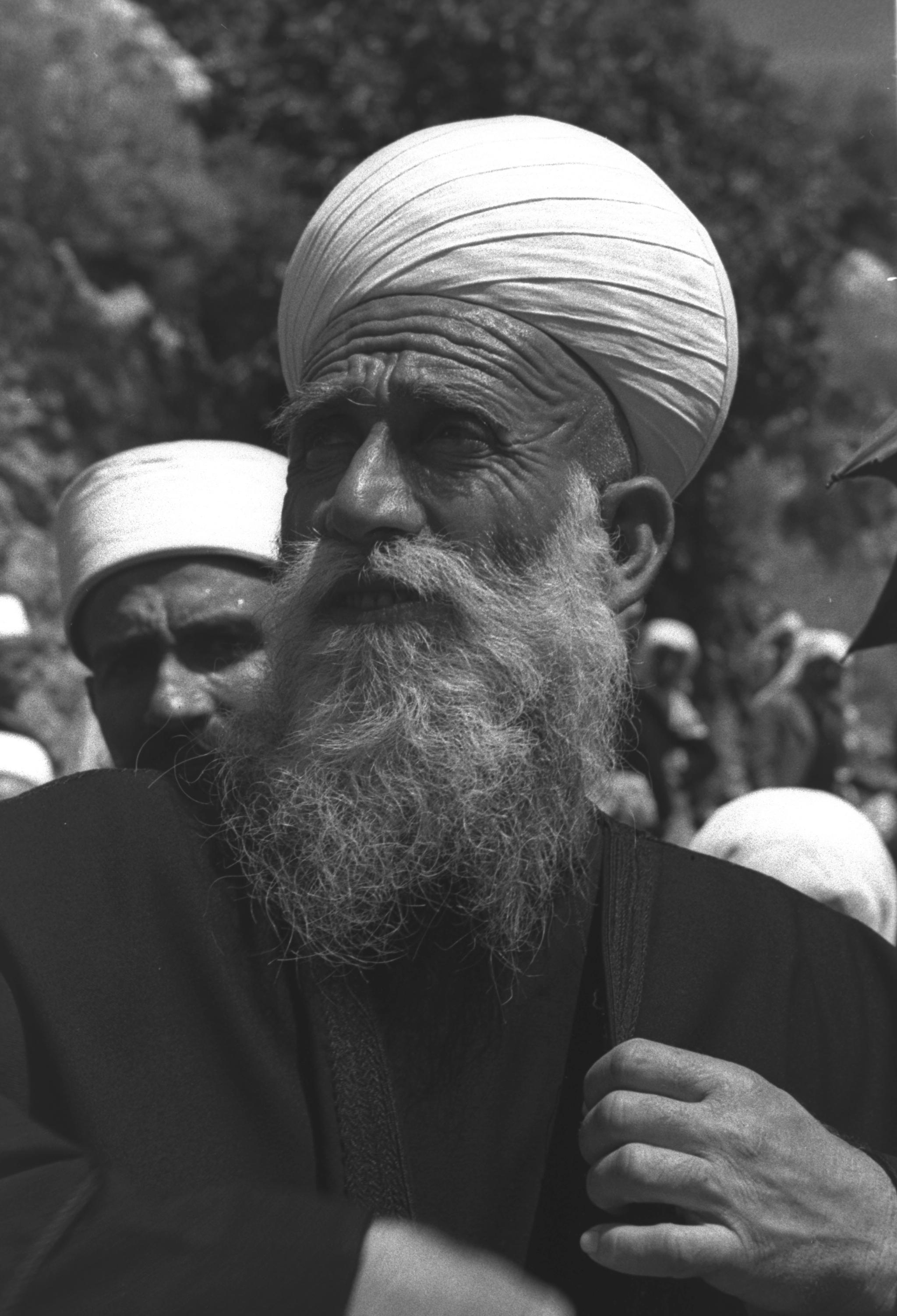
Amin Tarif, religious leader of the Druze in Palestine and Israel

- Suliman Bashear – Palestinian-Israeli scholar of Islam
- Al-Hakim bi-Amr Allah – central religious figure of the faith and sixth Imam-Caliph of the Fatimid Caliphate
- Hamza ibn-'Ali ibn-Ahmad – founding religious leader
- Amin Tarif (1898–1993) – Israeli religious leader
- Mowafak Tarif – Israeli religious leader
- Abu Mohammad Jawad Walieddine (1916–2012) – Head of Authority of Senior Sheikhs

== Sports ==
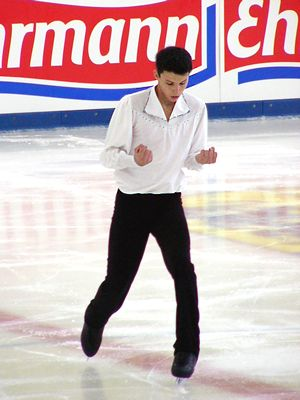
Nazar Mahmud, Israeli figure skater

- Zidan Amar – Israeli footballer.
- Weaam Amasha – Israeli footballer playing for F.C. Tira and the Israeli national junior team
- Ahad Azam – Israeli footballer playing for Bnei Eilat and the Israeli national junior team
- Amir Nasar A Din – Israeli footballer
- Sari Falah – Israeli footballer playing for Bnei Sakhnin, the Israeli national junior team, and bronze medalist in the 2009 Maccabiah Games
- Amir Halaby – Israeli footballer
- Shareef Keouf – Israeli footballer playing for Maccabi Haifa and the Israeli national junior team
- Mahran Lala – Israeli footballer playing for Hapoel Tel Aviv.
- Nazar Mahmud – Israeli figure skater
- Raja Rafe – Syrian footballer
- Kenny Hasan Sayef – American-Israeli footballer playing for Maccabi Haifa and the Israeli national team.
- Saleh Shahin (born 1982) – Israeli Paralympic medalist rower

== Visual arts ==
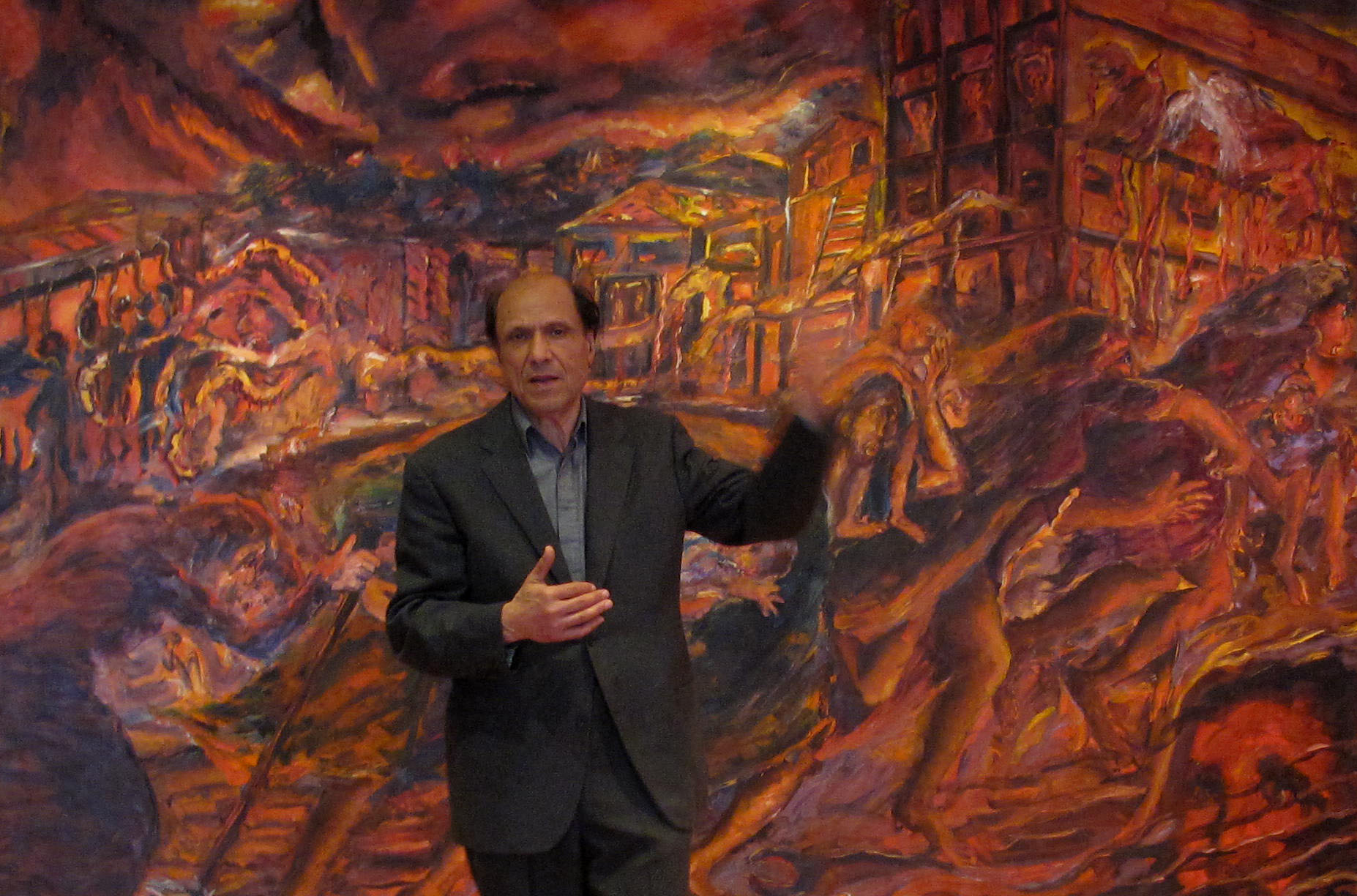
Nabil Kanso, Lebanese-American painter.

- Farid Mansour – Lebanese sculptor and painter
- Nabil Kanso – Lebanese-American painter
- Michael Netzer (Nassar) – American-Israeli graphical artist

== Others ==
- Nadia Aboulhosn – Lebanese-American plus-size model and blogger
- Azzam Azzam – Israeli textile worker, former Israeli prisoner in Egypt
- Amal Clooney – Lebanese-British lawyer, married to George Clooney
- al-Darazi – 11th-century Isma'ili preacher and early leader of the Druze faith
- Angelina Fares – Israeli beauty pageant contestant. She was a finalist in Miss Israel 2007.
- Tiran Fero – Israeli teenager removed from life support and held hostage by members of the Jenin Brigades armed group
- Majdi Halabi – disappeared and discovered Israeli soldier
- Samir Kuntar – Lebanese Hezbollah militant

== See also ==
- List of Israeli Druze
