= Halabi (surname) =

Alhalabi
Origin
- Region of origin: Syria

Other names
- Variant forms: Halaby, Haleb, Halep, Halepovich, El-Halabi, El Halabi, Elhalabi al-Halabi, Alhalabi, Halavi, Halevi

Halabi (Arabic: حَلَبِي, Hebrew: חַלַבִּי) is an Arabic locational surname, or nisba, denoting origin from Aleppo (Halab), Syria, or those who traded with Aleppo residents. Variants of the name include Halaby, Haleb, Halep, and Halepovich. People with the surname include:

- Amir Halaby (Arabic: امير حلبي, Hebrew: אמיר חלבי) (born 1986), Israeli Druze football player
- Ibrāhīm al-Ḥalabī (died 1549), Ottoman Ḥanafī legist
- Lisa Halaby (born 1951), Queen Noor of Jordan
- Majdi Halabi (Arabic: مجدي حلبي, Hebrew: מג'די חלבי) (1985–2005), Israeli Druze soldier
- Muhammad Ali al-Halabi (born 1937), Syrian politician and Prime Minister
- Najeeb Halaby (1915–2003), Lebanese-American businessman
- Rafik Halabi (Arabic: رفيق حلبي, Hebrew: רפיק חלבי) (born 1946), Israeli Druze public figure
- Rola El-Halabi (born 1985), Lebanese-German boxer
- Salah Halabi, Egyptian army officer
- Michael Halaby (born 1969), Lebanese-American Engineer; Rotarian & Founder of Tripoli Association of Atlanta
- Samia Halaby (born 1936), Palestinian artist
- Simon Halabi (born 1950), Syrian businessman
- Suleiman al-Halabi (1777–1800), Syrian assassin
- Susan Halabi, Lebanese-American biostatistician
- Usama Halabi (born 1959), Israeli Druze lawyer
- Yasser El Halaby (born 1984), Egyptian squash player
- Simon Nor al-Halabi (born 1991), Syrian technology consultant

== See also ==
- Alabi
- Halab (disambiguation)
