= Halab (disambiguation) =

Halab is the ancient name of Aleppo in northern Syria.

Halab may also refer to:

== Places ==
- Aleppo Governorate, Syria
- Halab, Iran, a city in Zanjan Province, Iran
- Halab, Isfahan, a village in Isfahan Province, Iran
- Halab District, an administrative subdivision of Iran

== Other uses ==
- Halab, a subgroup of the Dom people of North Africa

== See also ==
- Halab 100, an Egyptian ship of the line, see List of ships of the line of Egypt
- Radhuiya Halab Fakhir, an elected member in the Iraqi Babil governorate council election, 2005
- Halabja, a town in Iraqi Kurdistan and the site of 1988 poison gas attack
- Aleppo (disambiguation)
