= Alabi =

- Gender: Male
- Language: Yoruba

Origin
- Origin: Nigerian
- Region of origin: South -West Nigeria

Àlàbí is a surname of Yoruba origin.

== Notable people with the surname ==
- Abiodun Alabi (born 1964), Nigerian police chief
- Akin Alabi, Nigerian music video director, writer and entrepreneur
- Anthony Alabi (born 1981), American football player and actor
- Biola Alabi, Nigerian businesswoman
- Bisi Akin-Alabi, Nigerian educator and social worker
- Emily Alabi, American actress
- Goski Alabi, Ghanaian academic, author and entrepreneur
- James Alabi (born 1994), English footballer
- Johannes Alabi (c. 1743–1820), leader of the Saramaccaans, a Maroon village in Suriname
- Joshua Alabi (born 1958), Ghanaian academic and politician
- Kayode Alabi (born 1963), Nigerian politician
- Meji Alabi (born 1988), Nigerian music video director
- Mojeed Alabi (born 1962), Nigerian politician and lawyer
- Olatunji Ajisomo Alabi (1915–1998), Nigerian business tycoon
- Oloye Akin Alabi (born 1977), Nigerian politician
- Ralph Alabi (1941–2009), Nigerian engineer and industrialist
- Rasheed Alabi (born 1986), Nigerian footballer
- Samuel Alabi (born 2000), Ghanaian footballer
- Sasha P (born Anthonia Yetunde Alabi, 1983), Nigerian singer and lawyer
- Solomon Alabi (born 1988), Nigerian basketball player
- Tope Alabi (born 1970), Nigerian singer
- Zainab Damilola Alabi (born 2002), Nigerian badminton player

== See also ==
- Halabi (disambiguation)
