= Majdi Halabi =

Israeli Druze MIA soldier

Majdi Halabi (Arabic: مجدي حلبي, Hebrew: מג'די חלבי; born 1985, disappeared May 24, 2005), alternatively Majdy Halabi or Majdi Halaby, was an Israeli Druze soldier from the village of Daliyat al-Karmel, located on the slopes of Mount Carmel, who disappeared on duty near Haifa in May 2005.

Halabi's body was found in 2012 on Mount Carmel and he was buried in Isfiya with full military honors.

== Background ==
Halabi was born in 1985 to Nazmi Halabi, an employee at the Friends of the Israel Defense Forces, and Fahmiya Halabi, in the Druze village of Daliyat al-Karmel, located on Mount Carmel. Halabi began his mandatory military service in the IDF in the Israeli Air Force at a Be'er sheva campus of the Israeli Air and Space Technical College but had difficulties serving at the place and as a result he lowered his Medical Profile and was transferred to serve in a vehicle workshop of the Ordnance Corps, at a maintenance and rehabilitation (מרכז שיקום ואחזקה) base located near Haifa. When Halabi asked to raise his Medical Profile back in order to be transferred back to his old unit he was refused. During his military service Halabi became an absentee several times from the military bases in which he served.

== The disappearance and search efforts ==
Halabi disappeared on Tuesday, May 24, 2005, while he attempted to hitchhike from his village to his Ordnance Corps camp near Tirat Carmel, without carrying any weapons. At the time of his disappearance, he had served in the Israel Defense Forces (IDF) for five months.

In his parents' testimony given afterwards, they claimed that he was last seen in civilian clothes and that he took with him a small bag, in which he presumably carried his IDF uniform. Nevertheless, additional witnesses claimed to have seen him in uniform. A witness from Halabi's village stated that he saw Halabi around 15:30 at the grocery store of the village, buying a beverage can, and further investigation revealed that he had pulled out 50 NIS from an ATM in his village before his disappearance. Various officers involved in the case claimed after the fact that there were a number of contradictions in the testimonies of his family members regarding his apparel, and the day and time he was last seen.

Two days after his disappearance, Halabi's commanding officers visited his home in order to inquire about his whereabouts. As a result, a search was launched by Halabi's family, aided by Halabi's friends and the various residents of Daliyat al-Karmel. Searches were conducted in the village, on nearby beaches, in Haifa and in the Krayot and in the forests of Mount Carmel. The searches were even expanded later on to Tiberias and Eilat, after the family received information that someone similar to Halabi was seen in those cities. Throughout his first week of disappearance the IDF did not assist the family in their searches for Halabi. The local media reported in many occasions about the disappearance and the search efforts, but the matter got almost no exposure in the national media outlets. This fact was later on severely criticized by many officials, among them the head of the Druze community in Israel, Sheikh Mowafaq Tarif.

On 30 May 2005, a week after his disappearance, the IDF officially declared Halabi as absent. Halabi's family was furious over the military's delay in announcing that he was his missing, as they requested that he would be declared as such already in the evening in which it was first discovered that had disappeared. Following the declaration, the IDF launched a massive search effort that involved the use of regular and reserve IDF troops, sniffer dogs from the Oketz Unit, and drones equipped with thermal imaging systems. The area where his body was eventually found was combed repeatedly, but it was not found due to the thickness of the forest and mountainous terrain. More than one hundred volunteers participated in search efforts in the Mount Carmel area. Halabi was formally declared to be missing in action (MIA) on June 6. Throughout the following years, police established several teams to investigate his disappearance. Compared to Israeli soldier Gilad Shalit, Halabi's disappearance received relatively little coverage in the Israeli media. According to a 2007 article in Israel Today, his case was "all but forgotten" nationally and internationally.

As part of the effort to find any information that would eventually lead to solving the mystery of his absence, his family offered a reward for any information that would be given of his whereabouts, and the organization Born to Freedom Foundation, that aims to accelerate the release of IDF POWs and missing soldiers, began publishing the case widely in order to bring public awareness to Halabi's disappearance. Subsequently, the Born to Freedom Foundation offered a reward of USD10,000,000 for information leading to Halabi's location.

== Later developments ==
On May 24, 2007, the second anniversary of Halabi's disappearance, Halabi's family and residents of Carmel City held a gathering to raise awareness of Halabi's case and call for increased efforts to locate him. The event was attended by a large crowd, including many Druze military officers, the Defense Minister Amir Peretz, and Karnit Goldwasser (the wife of the kidnapped IDF soldier Ehud Goldwasser) who spoke in the event, and Zvi Regev who is the father of the kidnapped soldier Eldad Regev. Defense Minister Amir Peretz stated in the event that he had been in contact with the family on a weekly basis in order to encourage the family. The families of the three IDF soldiers kidnapped in the 2000 Hezbollah cross-border raid, whom also attended the event, also expressed their support of Halabi's family.

In a 2007 interview with The Jerusalem Post, Halabi's uncle, Samih Halabi, a retired IDF colonel and chairman of the Campaign to Find Missing Soldier Majdi Halabi, expressed the belief that Halabi had been abducted by an Islamic "terrorist organization" and was "being held in Syria, Lebanon or possibly even in Nablus or Jenin in the West Bank".

On July 2, 2008, Halabi's family received a telephone call from an inmate in Damon Prison who claimed that Halabi had been abducted and was being held in the vicinity of Nablus in the West Bank. Police officials maintained that the inmate had "no substantial information" regarding Halabi's disappearance, but the Halabi family disputed this claim.

In 2010, the killer of 18-year-old Danna Bennett, Yahya Adwan Farhan (יחיא עדואן פרחאן), stated in an interview with Ma'ariv that he knows what caused the disappearance of Majdi Halabi, but declined to provide further information.

In 2011, Halabi's brother, Adham Nazmi Halabi, 21, was killed in a traffic accident in Daliyat al-Karmel. He had been serving in the Israel Border Police at the time of his death.

In April 2012, it was reported that two prisoners serving sentences for murder and drug-related offenses were negotiating a plea bargain to supply the burial location of Halabi in return for being freed as well as a few hundred thousand shekels.

== Discovery of body ==
In the aftermath of the 2010 Carmel Fire, Halabi's family asked that the search be resumed, as the forest floor was more exposed. On 10 October 2012, his body was found in a forest near Isfiya. Halabi's childhood friend, Ibrahim Kozly of Daliyat al-Karmel, discovered his body while performing clearing work for the Jewish National Fund as part of the Carmel Forest's rehabilitation project. Halabi's body became visible after he removed tree debris from the area. A knife was discovered near the body. The body was transferred to the Abu Kabir Forensic Institute in Tel Aviv, where DNA testing confirmed that it was Halabi's.

Halabi was buried in Isfiya's military cemetery with full military honors on October 12, 2012, in a funeral that saw over 2,000 people in attendance.

== See also ==
- Israeli MIAs
- Tapuah Junction stabbing (2010)
- List of Israeli Druze
