= Halabi =

Halabi may refer to:

- Halabi (surname), including a list of people with the name
- Halabi, Iran, a village
- from Aleppo in Syria
  - Halabi Jews
- Halbi, an Indic language

== See also ==
- Alabi (surname)
- Helebi, a dialect of Domari language
