= Hiyam Qablan =

Palestinian poet and short story writer (born 1956)

Hiyam Qablan (sometimes Hiam Kablan) (Arabic: هيام قبلان; born 1956) is a Palestinian poet and short story writer.

== Biography ==
Qablan was born in the village of Isfiya and received her primary education at the village school; for high school she went to Nazareth, where she attended the Franciscan Sisters' School. At Haifa University she studied history and education. She lives in Daliyat al-Karmel, where she has worked as an Arabic teacher. Some of her poetry has been translated into Hebrew; she has also written a regular column, "Ala ajnihat al-rish" ("On the Wings of a Feather"), in al-Sinnara. She has published several volumes of verse and short fiction, beginning with Amal 'ala al-durub (Hops on the Roads) in 1975. She is a regular attendee of poetry festivals, including that held at Sde Boker College.
