= Benjamin Miller (academic) =

Israeli scholar of international relations

- Occupations: Academic and author

Academic background
- Education: B.A. M.A. Ph.D.
- Alma mater: University of Haifa; Hebrew University of Jerusalem; University of California, Berkeley

Benjamin Miller (Hebrew: בנימין מילר) is an Israeli scholar of international relations and a professor at the University of Haifa, where he also serves as director of the National Security Center. He is a former president of the Israeli Association of International Studies.

Miller's work has explored the causes of war and peace at both global and regional levels, with particular attention to grand strategy, state-to-nation balance, and power dynamics.

== Education ==
Miller earned his B.A. from the University of Haifa in 1977, followed by an M.A. from the Hebrew University of Jerusalem in 1981. He completed his Ph.D. at the University of California, Berkeley, in 1988 under the supervision of Kenneth Waltz.

== Career ==
Prior to his academic career, Miller completed the Israeli Foreign Ministry's cadet course and worked in the Israeli delegation to the UN. He has held academic appointments at the Hebrew University of Jerusalem and the University of Haifa. His research fellowships include positions at Harvard University, under Samuel Huntington, MIT, under Barry Posen, Princeton University, and Princeton Institute for International and Regional Studies (PIIRS). From 2021 to 2022, he was a visiting scholar at Harvard's Weatherhead Center for International Affairs.

== Research and work ==
Miller's research has addressed debates in international relations, especially the causes of conflict and cooperation, and the formation of regional and global orders.

In 1995 and then in a 2nd paperback ed. in 2002, Miller published a book titled When Opponents Cooperate: Great Power Conflict and Collaboration in World Politics. A review by Randall L. Schweller in The Journal of Politics stated that this book "raises important theoretical and empirical puzzles and advances many plausible explanations" and adds "to anyone seeking to understand what makes the clock tick in international relations". While describing this book as a "valuable addition", he also mentioned that "Miller's book is not without flaws", as it "offers only an impressionistic treatment of unit-level factors" and "artificially forces his dependent variables into polar opposition". Stephen R. Rock reviewed the book in the American Political Science Review and suggested that this is "One of the best books on international relations theory to be published in recent years". The review in the Mershon International Studies Review highlighted that "Miller's theory is multileveled and quite detailed" and "his analysis is clearly and systematically presented". According to Michael Clarke of King's College London, "Miller's analysis represents an important contribution on a number of fronts" and "confident enough to spell out both descriptive and predictive hypotheses". He also noted that "Miller's analysis is unlikely to be persuasive" to people who are skeptical about international relations theory, as readers will feel "uneasy at the reduction of some historical materials almost two centuries apart to such glib theoretical types".

A review by Randall L. Schweller in The Journal of Politics stated that this book "raises important theoretical and empirical puzzles and advances many plausible explanations" and adds "to anyone seeking to understand what makes the clock tick in international relations". While describing this book as a valuable addition, he also mentioned that "Miller's book is not without flaws", as it "offers only an impressionistic treatment of unit-level factors" and "artificially forces his dependent variables into polar opposition". Schweller concluded the review writing that "the strengths of Miller's book far outweigh its weaknesses."

Miller's 2007 book, States, Nations, and the Great Powers: The Sources of Regional War and Peace, presented the differences between different types of cold and warm war and peace, applied these types to different regions, and explained them by integrating the effects of the state-to-nation balance, with the effects of the international system. On the debate between realist causes vs. liberal causes of Regional War and Peace, Miller proposed that the degree of congruence between state borders and national identities (the "state-to-nation balance") explains regional war-proneness. A higher balance correlates with peaceful regions, while imbalances increase the likelihood of conflict. G. John Ikenberry commented that the book is "full of useful insights about potential pathways toward regional peacemaking, particularly in regard to the Middle East". Anessa L. Kimball, an assistant professor at the Université Laval, characterized the book as an "interesting theory capable of explaining both civil and interstate conflicts within a regional context". However, she emphasized that the book's framework was theoretically complex since it failed to "differentiate between the internal and external elements of incongruence". Richard Little regarded it as a "major contribution to the literature on war and peace". He additionally remarked that "Historians may complain that the framework oversimplifies the complexities of regional war and peace". However, he promptly dismissed this, adding that "in the social sciences, this book raises the bar considerably". Kal J. Holsti described this book as a "major and novel approach to the classical war and peace puzzles" and it "significantly addresses the shortcomings of other approaches". He also discussed how Miller's "tendency to explain war proneness in materialist or broad sociological terms" prompts him to overlook the "normative dimensions of war-making".

Miller contributed to the debate on the sources of grand strategy. He analyzed U.S. grand strategy by examining how systemic conditions broker domestic/ideational competition on the best strategy. He explained how post-9/11 systemic factors facilitated the rise of offensive liberalism and interventionist strategies. Miller's Grand Strategy from Truman to Trump book, based on US international strategy, presented the security frameworks that facilitated decision-making under the influence of peace and war. Barbara Zanchetta categorized the book as an "interesting and innovative book that accounts for variations and shifts in American grand strategy". By defining the book's structure as a "theoretical unanswered puzzle", she also underlined that, from the perspective of a historian, "there are some excessively simplistic claims throughout the book". In a round-table on the book, reviewers explicitly stated that Miller and Rubinovitz have authored a "formidable book". Grinberg commended the authors for setting readers "on the road to understanding how these changes occur and allows us to have some sense of how to anticipate them in the future". Avey said that this book provided a "rich and thought-provoking analysis of the shape and sources of the last seventy-five years of US grand strategy". Popescu praised it for proposing a "rigorous theoretical explanation of why grand strategy changes" as well as a "'new course' for Washington's path in the decades to come. Restad reported that this book has an "analytic eclecticism" and "innovative theory of great power grand strategy". David W. Bath established that, throughout the book, the authors "struggle with facts that do not fit their theory" and lack the historical evidence to improve their "theoretical framework". He further added that while this was a "well-researched and well-sourced" book and presented an "intriguing theory", it failed to convince due to "constant miscues".

== Honors ==
- 2020 – Provost Prize for a Distinguished Senior Researcher, University of Haifa
- 2024 – Lifetime Achievement Award, The Israeli Association for International Studies

== Bibliography ==
=== Selected books ===
- Miller, Benjamin (2002). When Opponents Cooperate: Great Power Conflict and Collaboration in World Politics. University of Michigan. ISBN 9780472088720.
- Miller, Benjamin (2007). States, Nations, and the Great Powers: The Sources of Regional War and Peace. Cambridge University Press. ISBN 9780521691611.
- Miller, Benjamin; Lutmar, Carmela (2015). Regional Peacemaking and Conflict Management: A Comparative Approach. Taylor & Francis. ISBN 9781317692867.
- Miller, Benjamin (2016). International and Regional Security: The Causes of War and Peace. Taylor & Francis. ISBN 9781317285557.
- Miller, Benjamin; Rubinovitz, Ziv (2020). Grand Strategy from Truman to Trump. University of Chicago Press. ISBN 9780226735016.

=== Selected articles ===
- Miller, Benjamin (1992). "Explaining Great Power Cooperation in Conflict Management". World Politics. 45 (1): 1–46. doi:10.2307/2010517. JSTOR 2010517.
- Miller, Benjamin; Kagan, Korina (1997). "The Great Powers and Regional Conflicts: Eastern Europe and the Balkans from the Post-Napoleonic Era to the Post–Cold War Era". International Studies Quarterly. 41 (1): 51–85. doi:10.1111/0020-8833.00033.
- Miller, Benjamin (2001). "The Global Sources of Regional Transitions from War to Peace". Journal of Peace Research. 38 (2): 199–225. doi:10.1177/0022343301038002005.
- Miller, Benjamin (2001). "The Concept of Security: Should it be Redefined?". In Bar-Joseph, Uri (ed.). Israel's National Security Towards the 21st Century. Vol. 24. Routledge. pp. 13–42.
- Miller, Benjamin (2005). "When and How Regions Become Peaceful: Potential Theoretical Pathways to Peace". International Studies Review. 7 (2): 229–267. doi:10.1111/j.1468-2486.2005.00482.x.
- Miller, Benjamin (2006). "Balance of Power or the State-to-Nation Balance: Explaining Middle East War-Propensity". Security Studies. 15 (4): 658–705. doi:10.1080/09636410601184587.
- Miller, Benjamin (2009). "Between the Revisionist and the Frontier State: Regional Variations in State War-Propensity". Review of International Studies. 35 (S1): 85–119. doi:10.1017/S0260210509008444.
- Miller, Benjamin (2010). "Explaining Changes in U.S. Grand Strategy: 9/11, the Rise of Offensive Liberalism, and the War in Iraq". Security Studies. 19 (1): 26–65. doi:10.1080/09636410903546426.
- Miller, Benjamin (2012). "Does democratization pacify the state? The cases of Germany and Iraq". International Studies Quarterly. 56 (3): 455–469. doi:10.1111/j.1468-2478.2012.00733.x.
- Miller, Benjamin (2021). "How 'making the world in its own liberal image' made the West less liberal". International Affairs. 97 (5): 1353–1375. doi:10.1093/ia/iiab114.
- Miller, Benjamin (Spring 2025). "Nationalism and Conflict: How Do Variations of Nationalism Affect Variations in Domestic and International Conflict?". Political Science Quarterly. 140 (1): 29–62. doi:10.1093/psquar/qqae014.
