= Mouna Maroun =

- منى مارون
- Maroun in 2015
- Born: 1969 or 1970 (age 56–57); Isfiya, Haifa District, Israel
- Education: University of Haifa
- Scientific career
- Fields: Neuroscience
- Workplaces: University of Haifa

Mouna Maroun (Arabic: منى مارون, Hebrew: מונא מרון; born 1969 or 1970) is an Israeli neuroscientist and academic administrator serving as rector of the University of Haifa since 2024. She is the first Arab, Christian, or woman to hold the role. Her research focuses medical treatments for post-traumatic stress disorder.

== Early life and education ==
Maroun was born in 1969 or 1970 in Isfiya, one of four daughters in a Maronite family. Her parents had an elementary school education, but they encouraged education and church attendance. Maroun's grandparents moved to Isfiya from Lebanon in the early 20th-century. She did not speak Hebrew before attending university.

Maroun studied psychology at the University of Haifa. In her third year, she joined a research project that used rats as their animal disease model. She originally intended to be a physician, but she was not accepted into medical school. She earned a master's degree and Ph.D. in neurobiology. She is the first woman from her village to earn a doctorate. Maroun completed postdoctoral studies at the Paris-Sud University.

== Career ==
In 2001, Maroun returned to the University of Haifa where she worked in the Sagol Department of Neurobiology. She later became its department head and a tenured professor. As of 2021, she researches the neural basis for post-traumatic stress disorder (PTSD). Specifically, studies the neurobiology of learning, memory, and emotions. She has developed a medical injection preventing PTSD by erasing a specific memory of a fear.

In 2015, Maroun was one of a group of Israeli Arab scientists who established Al Maram. The organization promotes scientific events and resources for Arab teachers. She also organized A Different Lesson, a project sending scientists to speak at a school in an Arab town. In 2017, Maroun was appointed to the planning and budgeting committee of the Council for Higher Education in Israel. Her three year term was extended for another term. In this role, she initiated a committee projected to increase accessibility of higher education for Arab citizens.

Maroun's appointment as rector of the University of Haifa was announced on 11 April 2024. She is the first Arab, Christian, or woman in the role at the university. She began her four-year term in October. Maroun was previously the vice president for research. As rector, she met Pope Leo XIV at the Vatican City, describing the experience as a, "peak of my life."

== Personal life ==
Maroun's father died in 2025 at the age of 101 years.
