= Usama Halabi =

Usama R. Halabi (also Osama Halaby; Daliyat Al-Karmel, Haifa, 1959) is a Palestinian Druze lawyer of Israeli citizenship.

He studied at the Hebrew University in Jerusalem, graduating with an LLB in 1982 and an LL.M. in 1987. He continued his legal studies and earned an LLM in International Legal Studies from the Washington College of Law at the American University in Washington DC in 1991; returned to Jerusalem and has been in private practice since 1996, as a legal researcher and advocate.

Halabi is a founding member of Mada al-Carmel — Arab Center for Applied Social Research in 2000. He has collaborated with Adalah – The Legal Center for Arab Minority Rights in Israel. He is also a member of Badil- Resource Center for Palestinian Residency and Refugee Rights He was a member of the board of B'Tselem – The Israeli Information Center in the Occupied Territories. and serves as a legal advisor for many non-profit organizations He has also acted as a legal expert for the UNDP and as a senior lawyer at the Quaker Legal Aid (QLAC) in East Jerusalem.

He handles Human and Civil Rights cases. His work and research focuses on constitutional and administrative law, planning law and land expropriation. His published work deals with the legal jurisdictional status of Jerusalem, Israeli practice in the West Bank and Gaza, and the status and rights of the Arab minority in Israel. His publications include "Limits of a Place in Human Existence: Two Dimensions, Geography and Demography in Israel's East Jerusalem Policy Between 1967–2000" (Jerusalem 2001) and "Israel’s Land Laws as a Political Tool"

== See also ==
- Israeli land and property laws
- House demolition in the Israeli–Palestinian conflict
