= Abu Mohammad Jawad Walieddine =

Sheikh Jawad Walieddine
- الشيخ أبو محمد جواد ولي الدين
- Title: Supreme Spiritual Authority (Marja')

Personal life
- Born: 1916 Baakline, Lebanon
- Died: April 27, 2012 (aged 96) Chouf,Baakline, Lebanon

Religious life
- Religion: Druze (Muwahhidun)

Senior posting
- Based in: Shouf District, Lebanon
- Period in office: 1988–2012

Abu Mohammad Jawad Walieddine (Arabic: الشيخ أبو محمد جواد ولي الدين; 1916 – April 27, 2012) was a Lebanese religious leader and the supreme spiritual authority (Marja) of the Druze community in Lebanon, Syria, Jordan, and Israel from 1988 until his death in 2012. Known as the "Lion of the Shouf" and the "Sheikh of the Jazeera," he was the head of the Druze Spiritual Council and a key figure in the post-war reconciliation of Mount Lebanon.

== Early life and education ==
Walieddine was born in 1916 in Baakline, Shouf District. He dedicated his life to the Unitarian (Muwahhidun) faith as a youth. He received his spiritual education at the Khalwat al-Bayada, the premier Druze theological center, where he attained the highest levels of religious knowledge.

== Spiritual leadership ==
In 1988, Walieddine was officially designated as the community's highest spiritual reference. He was honored with the Al-’Imama al-Mukawwara (the rounded turban), a rare distinction signifying supreme piety and wisdom. Throughout the Lebanese Civil War and the subsequent peace process, he remained a neutral moral authority, famously hosting the "Mountain Reconciliation" meetings to restore harmony between the Druze and Christian populations of the Shouf.

== Death ==
Sheikh Walieddine died on April 27, 2012, at the age of 96. His funeral in Baakline was attended by approximately 50,000 mourners, including high-ranking political and religious leaders from across the Middle East.

== See also ==
- List of Druze

== Sources ==
- Official Obituary: Ya Libnan - Sheikh Abu Mohammad Jawad Walieddine passes away (April 27, 2012)
- News Coverage: The Daily Star - Walieddine, Druze regional spiritual authority, dies at age 96 (April 28, 2012)
- Biographical Data: Wikipedia - Abu Mohammad Jawad Walieddine (Existing English stub for expansion)
- Official Council News: Moshiakhat al-Aql - Official News Archives regarding Sheikh Walieddine's house in Baakline
