= Nada Nadim Prouty =

Lebanese former intelligence professional (born c. 1970)

- Born: Nada Nadim Al-Awar c. 1970; Beirut, Lebanon
- Occupations: FBI agent, later CIA agent (covert operations)
- Known for: Former CIA agent who pled guilty two felonies related to a sham (green card) marriage and to one misdemeanor count of unauthorized use of an FBI computer
- Notable work: Uncompromised, Palgrave Macmillan, 2011
- Website: nadaprouty.com

Nada Nadim Prouty (née Al-Aouar; born c. 1970) is a Lebanese former intelligence professional of Druze descent who worked in American counter-terrorism with the FBI and CIA. She worked on high-profile cases like the USS Cole bombing and was stationed in Baghdad during the Iraq War. She resigned after a government investigation into her brother-in-law, Talal Khalil Chahin, allegedly led to the discovery of her having committed immigration-related marriage fraud. Prouty claims she disclosed the sham marriage to the FBI when she applied, and the FBI has not denied this claim, stating simply the FBI "never condoned" the marriage.

She was born into the Druze faith. Later in life, she converted to Catholicism.

== Biography ==
Prouty grew up in Lebanon. When she was 19 she fled the Lebanese Civil War and her father's plans to put her in an arranged marriage. She came to the United States on a student visa (the American University in Lebanon had suspended classes) and attended the Detroit College of Business. She entered into a fraudulent marriage to a US citizen to be able to afford her tuition and to stay in the US and not go back to Lebanon. Her sister also came to the US. Prouty got an accounting degree and joined the FBI on the advice of a professor.

In the FBI Prouty was a special agent on an international terrorism squad. She worked on the USS Cole bombing case, the Khobar Towers bombing case, the Laurence Foley case, and other terrorism cases. In about 2003 she joined the CIA. She thought the CIA would allow her cultural background and linguistic abilities to be used more effectively in her work. She felt that in the FBI, linguists were treated as "second class citizens".

Prouty worked for the CIA in Baghdad, trying to prevent terrorist attacks in the wake of the 2003 invasion of Iraq. She had believed Colin Powell's presentation about Iraq's weapons of mass destruction (WMD), and that Iraq had connections to al-Qaeda. She later described herself as having felt "fooled" by the authorities when it was discovered there were no WMDs. Despite this, she felt obligated to stay in her job and help save lives.

On May 13, 2008, the U.S. District Court, Eastern District of Michigan, Southern Division entered an order revoking Prouty's naturalization as a result of her conviction for Naturalization Fraud in violation of Title 18, United States Code, Section 1425(a). On the same day, the U.S. District Court entered an Order of Removal (deportation) and a concurrent grant of the withholding of removal to Lebanon, both pursuant to United States Code, Section 1228(c).

In mid-November 2011, Prouty again became a legal resident alien of the US after some of the top officials in the government intervened and signed off on the change of status. She applied for full citizenship and claims to have received it.She later moved to UAE.

== Investigation ==
Prouty's brother-in-law was Talal Khalil Chahin, owner of the La Shish restaurants in Michigan. Chahin was later investigated for numerous alleged activities including tax evasion, bribery, extortion, and associating with Sheikh Muhammad Hussein Fadlallah. In 2007 Chahin was a fugitive living in Lebanon.

Eventually the investigations of Chahin led some people in the US Department of Justice (DOJ) to investigate Prouty. The government interviewed her and implied that she had accessed information about Hezbollah and her relatives on the FBI's computer systems, which the DOJ argued was a misdemeanor violation of the Computer Fraud and Abuse Act. She called the idea that she had used the system to look up information on Hezbollah or her relatives "absolutely false and absurd". US officials later said that there was no evidence that Prouty had improperly disclosed any information to anyone. There was also no evidence that she passed secrets to Hezbollah or to other groups the United States considers to be terrorist organizations.

However, the investigation allegedly uncovered that Prouty, her sister, and a female friend had all committed immigration fraud in 1989, when she was 19 years old, by paying a man to marry her so she could obtain United States citizenship. Prouty claims she disclosed the sham marriage on her application to the FBI and that the FBI could not have been unaware of the marriage, given the extensive background investigations required by her FBI duties. She voluntarily waived the 10-year statute of limitations on immigration fraud, and, in 2007, pleaded guilty to two felonies related to the sham marriage and to one misdemeanor count of unauthorized use of an FBI computer. The tactics allegedly used against her to force a plea deal included the freezing of bank accounts, threatening family members, threatening to go after her husband, threatening her with deportation, threatening to charge her with dozens of felonies, and threatening to publicly reveal her identity as an FBI and CIA agent. She also described that if she was deported to Lebanon, it would be a "death sentence" and she feared torture or murder by groups there. She had a young child to care for, and her decision to plea was heavily influenced by her position as a mother. She was also influenced by the high costs of putting up a legal defense. She was given no jail time, although her plea agreement left that option open for the judge in her case.

The structure of the plea required the judge to revoke Prouty's United States citizenship, but she was granted withholding of deportation/removal by a judge on account of the perceived threat to her life and safety in her native country for her activities in the United States.

The US Attorney who prosecuted Prouty was promoted to the position of a federal judge in Michigan.

== Portrayal in media ==
A 60 Minutes story on Prouty was sympathetic. They interviewed her and asked "Was a traitor exposed? Or did America lose a patriot?"

She wrote a book, Uncompromised, published by Pargrave Macmillan in 2011.

== See also ==
- List of Druze
