= Amir Halaby =

Israeli-Druze footballer

Amir Halaby امير حلبي
Personal information
- Full name: Amir Halaby
- Date of birth: August 19, 1986 (age 40)
- Place of birth: Daliyat al-Karmel, Israel

Youth career
- Maccabi Netanya

Senior career*
Years	Team	Apps	(Gls)
2006–2008	Maccabi Netanya	1	(0)
2010–2012	Hapoel Ramot Menashe Megiddo	3	(0)
- * Club domestic league appearances and goals

Amir Halaby (Arabic: امير حلبي; born August 19, 1986) is an Israeli-Druze football player.
