= University of Haifa =

Public university in Israel

- אוניברסיטת חיפה (Hebrew) جامعة حيفا (Arabic)
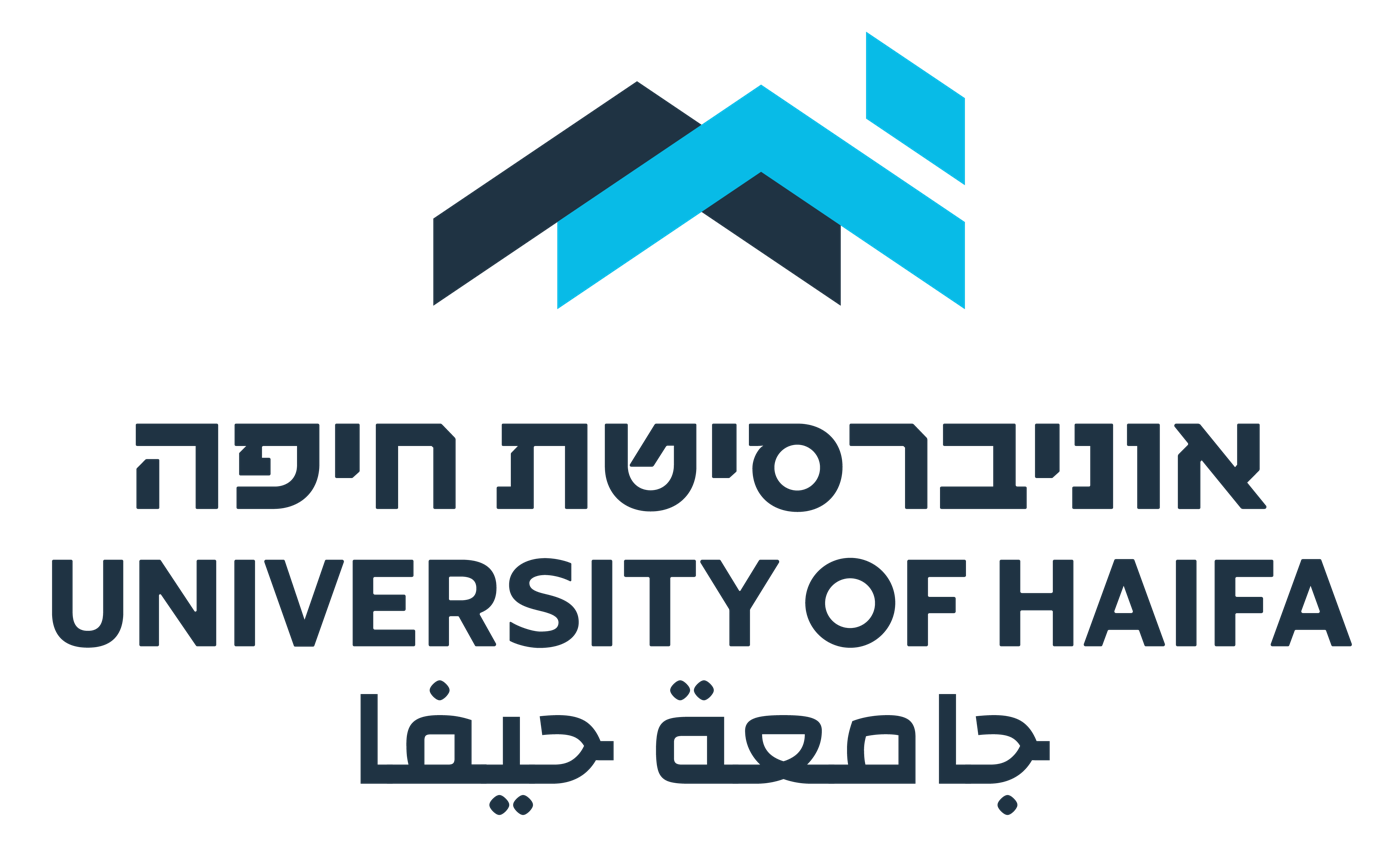
- Type: Public
- Established: 1963
- Affiliations: Global U8 (GU8)
- President: Gur Alroey
- Rector: Mouna Maroun
- Faculty: 1,323
- Students: 18,000+ (2023)
- Undergraduates: 8,888
- Postgraduates: 7,048
- Location: Haifa, Israel; 32°45′45″N 35°01′05″E
- Campus: Urban
- Colors: Cerulean, cadet blue, and blue dianne
- Website: www.haifa.ac.il/en/home/

University rankings

Global – Overall
- ARWU World: 601-700 (2024)
- CWTS World: 638 (2024)
- QS World: =678 (2026)
- THE World: 601-800 (2025)
- USNWR Global: 731 (2025)

The University of Haifa (Hebrew: אוניברסיטת חיפה, Arabic: جامعة حيفا) is a public research university located on Mount Carmel in Haifa, Israel. Founded in 1963 as a branch of the Hebrew University of Jerusalem, the University of Haifa received full academic accreditation as an independent university in 1972, becoming Israel's sixth academic institution and the fourth university. The university has the largest university library in Israel. As of 2025, approximately 17,000 students were enrolled at the University of Haifa. Among Israeli higher education institutions the University of Haifa has the largest percentage (41%) of Arab-Israeli students.

== Overview ==
The University of Haifa was founded in 1963 by Haifa mayor Abba Hushi, to operate under the academic auspices of the Hebrew University of Jerusalem. Haifa University is located on Mount Carmel. In 1972, the University of Haifa declared its independence and became the sixth academic institution in Israel and the fourth university.

About 18,100 undergraduate and graduate students study in the university a wide variety of topics, specializing in social sciences, humanities, law and education. The university is broadly divided into six faculties: Humanities, Social Sciences, Law, Science and Science Education, Social Welfare and Health Studies, and Education. There is also the Graduate School of Management, The Leon H. Charney School of Marine Sciences and the Continuing Education and Extension Studies, as well as an international school offering courses in English.

In 2024, the University established Israel's first university-based design school following a historic merger with the Neri Bloomfield Haifa School of Design (WIZO Haifa). Headed by Professor Leah Peretz, the School of Design continues to operate at its campus in the German Colony in downtown Haifa, offering academic programs in architecture, fashion design, visual communication, and photography.

The University officially opened the Herta and Paul Amir School of Medicine in October 2025 to address the acute shortage of physicians in northern Israel. The school's inaugural class consisted of 74 students. Professor Haim Bitterman, the former Chief Medical Officer of Clalit Health Services and former Vice Dean of the Faculty of Medicine at the Technion – Israel Institute of Technology, serves as the school's founding dean. Developed in collaboration with Clalit Health Services and the Carmel Medical Center, the school focuses its curriculum heavily on modern medical practices such as telemedicine and community-based medicine.

Beyond the objective of a first-rate higher education, the University of Haifa aims to provide equal educational opportunities to all, and in particular to encourage mutual understanding and cooperation between the Jewish and Arab populations on and off campus. The university is a home for students from all sectors of Israeli society—Jews, Muslims, Christians, Druze, religious and secular students and also many students from all over the world who study in the international school. In 2025, Arabs made up 44 percent of the student body. The University of Haifa is home to the Hecht Museum of archaeology and art, several research centers and institutes, including the Evolution Institute, Center for the Study of the Information Society, Center for the Study of National Security, Tourism Research Center, and more. The university also hosts a large IBM research center on its campus.

The university ranked in the top 100 institutions for UN sustainability goals. The university signed a memorandum of understanding with the Bahraini King Hamad Global Centre for Peaceful Coexistence to promote coexistence between Jews and Arabs.

== Research centers ==
Examples of the university research centers:

- The Institute of Evolution
- The Center for Cyber, Law and Policy
- Theoretical Physics and Astrophysics Center
- The Integrated Brain and Behavior Research Center (IBBR)
- The Institute of Information Processing and Decision Making
- The Max Wertheimer Minerva Center for Cognitive Processes
- Haifa Interdisciplinary Center for Advanced Computer Science
- The National Security Studies Center
- The Edmond J. Safra Brain Research Center for the Study of Learning Disabilities
- Center for Spatial Information Systems Research (CSISR)
- Maritime Policy & Strategy Research Center
- The Haifa Center for German European Studies
- The Weiss-Livnat International Center for Holocaust Research and Education
- Herta and Paul Amir School of Medicine
- The Contemporary Antisemitism Studies Association (CASA), launched in July 2026, is an international academic initiative dedicated to research on contemporary antisemitism.

== International MA programs ==
- Archaeology
- Archaeological Sciences (MSc)
- Education & Development in Early Childhood
- Environmental Intelligence
- Global Health Leadership (MPH)
- Heritage Management
- Holocaust Studies
- Israel Studies
- Jewish Thought
- Marine Biology (MSc)
- Marine Geosciences (MSc)
- Maritime Civilizations
- Modern German and European Studies
- National Security Studies
- Public Management and Policy Studies (MPA)
- Statistics - Data Science (MSc)
- Sustainability
- Technology Management

== Zinman Institute of Archaeology ==
The Zinman Institute of Archaeology is a research institute under Haifa's Faculty of Humanities. It was founded in 1988 with a donation from Betty and Philip Zinman and specializes in the archaeology of northern Israel, especially the area around Mount Carmel.

== Academic journals ==
Mishpat U’Memshal (Law and Government) – Founded in 1992, the journal deals with current and relevant public law issues. The publishing team is mainly composed of students under the academic supervision of a senior editor appointed by the Faculty of Law.

Hearot Din (Illuminating the Law) – Founded in 2004, the journal deals with changes in legal rulings in Israel. The publishing team is mainly composed of students under the academic supervision of a senior editor appointed by the Faculty of Law.

Din U’Devarim (Haifa Law Review) – Founded in 2005, the journal focuses on the interaction between the law and other fields of knowledge, especially the humanities and social sciences, but also serves as a platform for traditional legal writing. Faculty members produce the articles with the assistance of outstanding students at the Faculty of Law.

The Journal of Holocaust Research—formerly Dapim: Studies on the Holocaust (2009–2018)—is a bilingual (Hebrew and English) academic journal produced by the University of Haifa and the Ghetto Fighters' House and published by Routledge. It is available online and in print.

Michmanim – The Reuben and Edith Hecht Museum publishes a scholarly, dual language journal on archaeological research and artifacts in the museum's collections.

== Leadership ==
- University President – Gur Alroey
- University Rector – Mouna Maroun
- Chair, Board of Governors – Michal Amir Salkin

== Notable alumni ==
- Yitzhak Aharonovich, Israeli parliamentarian, Minister of Internal Security (2009-2015)
- Gabi Ashkenazi, IDF Chief of Staff (2007-2011)
- Ashraf Barhom, Israeli Arab actor
- Ronen Bergman, investigative journalist and author
- Inna Braverman, founder Eco Wave Power
- Meir Dagan, director of the Mossad
- Abdulwahab Darawshe, Israeli Arab parliamentarian (1984-1999)
- Yaakov Edri, Israeli parliamentarian (2003-2013), held several cabinet portfolios
- Lorenzo Dellai, mayor of Trento, doctor in Philosophy
- Nabila Espanioly, clinical psychologist, social worker and founder of Al-Tufula Center
- Benjamin Gantz, IDF Chief of General Staff (2011-2015), Alternate Prime Minister of Israel
- Noah Gal Gendler (born 1957), Ambassador of Israel to Albania
- Carine Goren, Israeli pastry chef, cookbook author, and television baking show host
- Gabriel Hallevy professor of law
- Dan Harel, IDF general, CEO of the Israeli Ministry of Transportation
- Maya Kalle-Bentzur (born 1958), Israeli Olympic runner and long jumper
- Ram Karmi, architect
- Benjamin Miller Israeli scholar of international relations
- Gadeer Mreeh, first Druze woman to become a member of the Knesset
- Idan Ofer, London-based Israeli business magnate and philanthropist
- Doron Perez, Executive Chairman World Mizrachi
- Mazi Melesa Pilip, Ethiopian-born American politician
- Yael Rubinstein Ambassador to Singapore 2013-2017
- Moran Samuel, rower and basketball player, bronze medalist at 2016 Rio Paralympic Games
- Guy Sasson, Paralympic wheelchair tennis player; Grand Slam champion
- Bernardo Sorj, sociologist
- Yochanan Vollach, footballer, president of Maccabi Haifa, CEO
- Haneen Zoabi, Israeli Arab parliamentarian (2009-2019), first Arab woman to be elected to the legislature on an Arab party's list
- Hiyam Qablan, poet
- Keren Tzur, actress and director

== Notable academics ==
- A. B. Yehoshua (1936–2022), novelist, essayist, and playwright
- Gad Barzilai
- Benjamin Beit-Hallahmi
- Nitza Ben-Dov
- David Bukay
- Shay Bushinsky
- Aharon Dolgopolsky
- Doron Kliger
- Eli Lancman
- Ronit Matalon
- Eviatar Nevo (born 1929), Evolutionary Biologist, Foreign Associate of the National Academy of Sciences USA
- Ronny Reich
- Lorenzo Dellai
- Daniel Schueftan
- Brenda Shaffer
- Camelia Suleiman, professor and academic
- Arnon Sofer
- Yuval Steinitz philosopher, former finance minister of Israel.
- Avigdor Stematsky (1908–89), painter
- Edward Trifonov (born 1937), molecular biophysicist, a founder of Israeli bioinformatics
- Natan Zach (born 1930), poet
- Dana Amir psychoanalyst

== See also ==
- List of universities in Israel
- Bucerius Institute for Research of Contemporary German History and Society
