= Aleppo (disambiguation) =

Aleppo is a city in Syria.

Aleppo may also refer to:

== Places ==
- Aleppo International Airport
- Aleppo International Stadium
- Citadel of Aleppo, a medieval ruin
- University of Aleppo, a public university founded in 1958

=== Regions ===
- Aleppo Governorate, a province of modern Syria
- Yamhad, a kingdom centered on Halab (Aleppo) between 19th–16th centuries BC
- Emirate of Aleppo, various principalities including
  - Hamdanid dynasty, during the Abbasid Caliphate
  - Mirdasid dynasty, during the Fatimid Caliphate
  - Zengid dynasty, under the Seljuk Empire
- Sultanate of Aleppo, another name for the Ayyubid Empire following the loss of Egypt to the Mamluks
- Aleppo Eyalet, a province of the Ottoman Empire from 1534 to 1864
- Aleppo Vilayet, a province of the Ottoman Empire from 1866 to 1918
- State of Aleppo, a League of Nations mandate from 1920 to 1925

=== United States ===
- Aleppo, Pennsylvania, an unincorporated community in Greene County, Pennsylvania
- Aleppo Township, Allegheny County, Pennsylvania
- Aleppo Township, Greene County, Pennsylvania
- Aleppo Shrine Auditorium, a Shriner arena in Wilmington, Massachusetts, United States

== Books ==
- Aleppo: The Rise and Fall of Syria's Great Merchant City

== See also ==
- Great Mosque of Aleppo (13th century)
- Central Synagogue of Aleppo
- Siege of Aleppo (disambiguation)
- Aleppo pine (Pinus halepensis), a kind of tree
- Aleppo Codex, the oldest complete manuscript of the Masoretic Hebrew Bible
- Aleppo pepper
- Aleppo boil, another name for cutaneous leishmaniasis, a disease
- Aleppo room, a beautiful room from Aleppo now in the Pergamon Museum
- Aleppo soap, a traditional vegetable oil soap
