= Sami Makarem =

Dr. Sami Makarem
- Born: Sami Nassib Makarem; April 14, 1931; Aytat Aley, Lebanon.
- Died: August 21, 2012 (aged 81)
- Education: University of Michigan
- Occupations: Scholar, writer, poet, artist
- Years active: 1956–2012
- Website: SamiMakarem.com

Sami Makarem (Arabic: سامي مكارم) (April 14, 1931 – August 21, 2012) was a Druze Lebanese scholar, writer, poet and artist; he was born in the village of Aitat in Aley district and is best known for his academic contributions in the fields of Islamic studies, Sufism, and Islamic history.

He obtained his bachelor's degree in literature and philosophy in 1954 and his master's degree in Arabic literature in 1957 from the American University of Beirut. In 1963, he achieved his PhD in Middle Eastern studies from the University of Michigan, where he taught the Arabic language and specialized in Islamic Batini studies.

== Career ==
- In July 1963, he returned to Lebanon, to teach Islamic thought at the Lebanese University. In 1964, he was appointed assistant professor at the American University of Beirut (AUB), teaching Arabic literature and Islamic thought.
- In 1970, he was promoted to the rank of associate professor at the American University of Beirut (AUB), and then he was promoted to the rank of full professor to teach Arabic literature, Islamic thought and Sufism. In addition, he held twice the position of head of the Department of Arabic Literature and Near Eastern Languages: from 1975 until 1978 and from 1993 until 1996. He acted as a part-time professor at the Lebanese University from 1977 until 1981. Also, he was director of the Center of Middle Eastern Studies at the American University in Beirut, from 1975 until 1978.

== Works ==
Professor Sami Makarem wrote over twenty five books mainly concerning the Islamic history and studies, Lebanese history and the Druze faith, in addition to a great number of articles in different specialized periodicals, and hundreds of art works.

=== Books ===
- Al-Shi'r al-'Arabi fi Lubnan Bayn al-Harbayn al-'Alamiyyatayn (Arab Poetry in Lebanon between the Two World Wars), 1957
- Ash-Shafiya, an Ismaili Poem Attributed to Shihabeddin Abu Firas (Edition and Translation into English with Notes and Introduction by Sami Makarem),1966
- Shiraz Madinat al-Awliya' wash-Shou'ara', a Translation of A. Arberry's Shiraz Persian City of Saints and Poets, 1966
- Adwa' 'ala Maslak at-Tawhid (Lights on the Druze Faith), 1966
- Al-Islam fi Mafhum al-Muwahhidin (Islam in the Druze Understanding), 1970
- The Doctrine of the Ismailis, 1972
- The Political Doctrine of the Ismailis; The Imamate, 1979
- Al-Hallaj,1989, New Edition, 2004
- 'Ashiqaat Allah (The loving "Saints" of God), 1994
- Ash-Shaykh 'Ali Faris Waliyy min al-Qarn ath-Thamin 'Ashar (Shaykh Ali Faris, An eighteenth-century Druze saint) 1998
- Lubnan fi 'ahd al-Umara' at- Tanukhiyyin (Lebanon Under the Tanukhid Emirs), 2000
- Al Taqiyya fil Islam (Dissimulation in Islam), 2004
- Al-'Irfan fi Maslak at-Tawhid (Mysticism in the Druze Faith), 2006

=== Poetry ===
In addition to his academic contributions in the fields of Islamic studies, Sufism, Islamic history, and his artistic contribution, he published three works of poetry:

- Mir'at 'ala Jabal Qaf (A mirror on Mount Qaf) (1996),
- Daw' fi Madinat ad-Dabab (A Light over the city of Mist) (1999)
- Qasa'ed Hubb 'ala shati' Mir'at (Love poems on the shores of a Mirror) (2004).
