= Isfiya =

Druze village in northern Israel

Isfiya: עספיא; عسفيا
- Local council

Hebrew transcription(s)
  - ISO 259: ʕisp̄íyaˀ
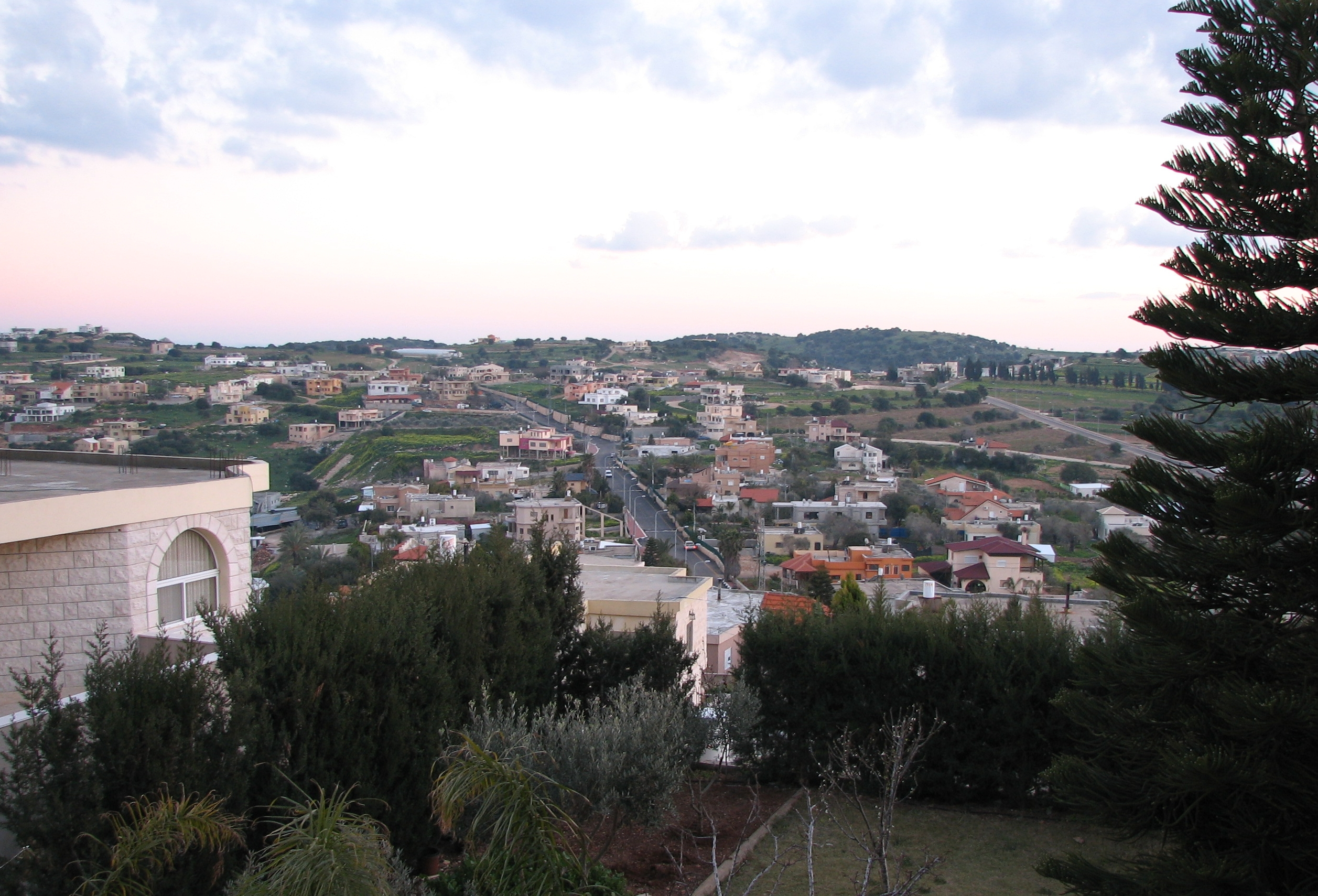
- View of the village

- Location within Israel Isfiya (Israel)
- Coordinates: 32°43′10″N 35°03′48″E
- Grid position: 156/236 PAL
- Country: Israel
- District: Haifa
- Subdistrict: Haifa

Area
  - Total: 15,561 dunams (15.561 km^{2}; 6.008 sq mi)

Population (2024)
  - Total: 13,403
  - Density: 861.32/km^{2} (2,230.8/sq mi)
- Name meaning: The devious (road)

Isfiya (Arabic: عسفيا, Hebrew: עִסְפִיָא), also known as Usfiya, is a Druze-majority village in northern Israel, governed by a local council. It also includes Christians, Muslims and a few Jewish households. Located on Mount Carmel, it is part of the Haifa District. In 2024 its population was 12,136. In 2003, the local council was merged with nearby Daliyat al-Karmel to form Carmel City. However, the new city was dissolved in 2008 and the two villages resumed their independent status.

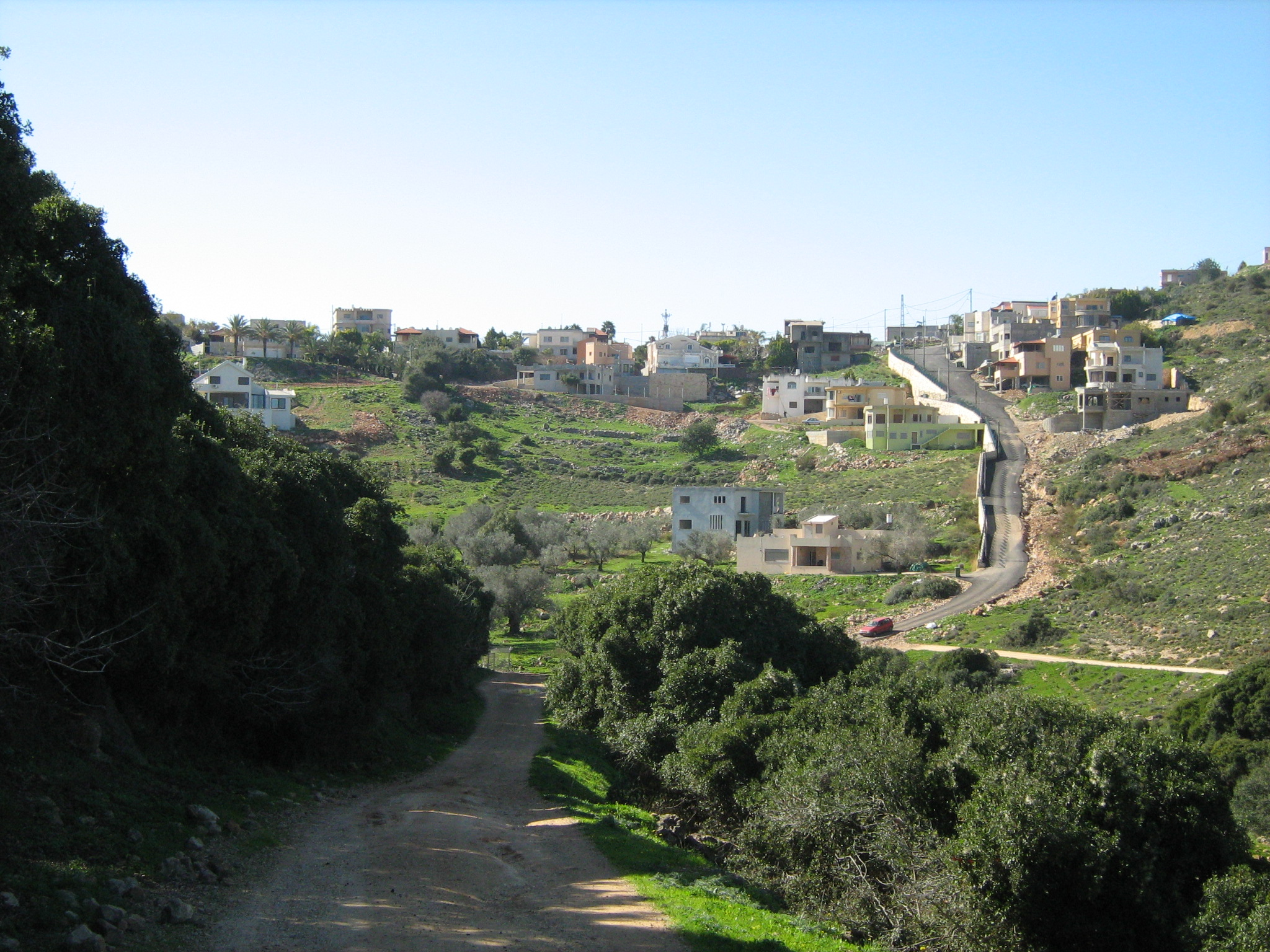
The outskirts of Isfiya

== History ==
Isfiya was built on the ruins of an ancient settlement. A building, dating from the second–fourth centuries CE has been excavated, together with ceramics and coins dating from the period.

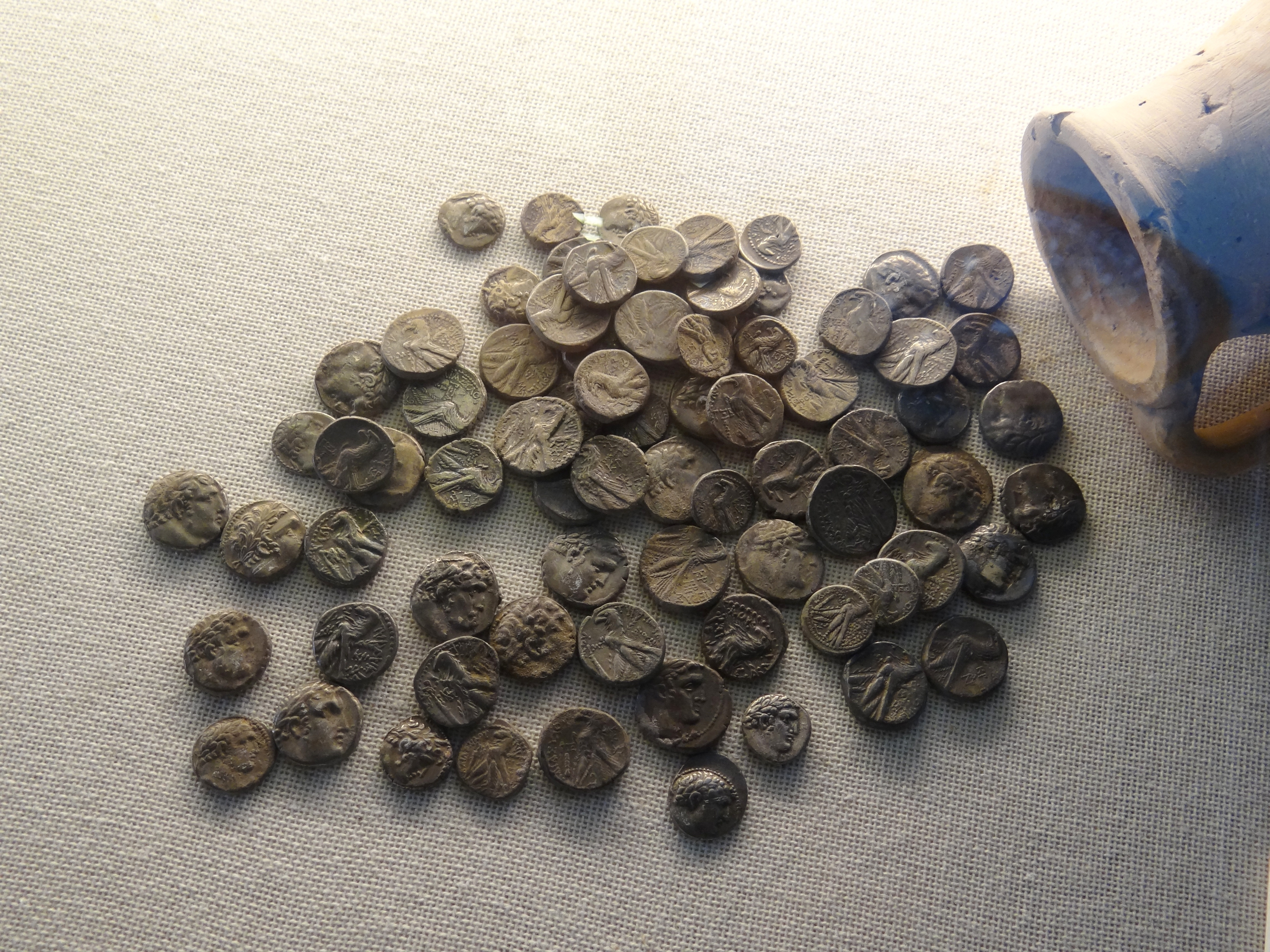
Treasure of Huseifa (Usifiyeh), from 24 BCE to 50 CE.

A rock-cut burial cave containing pottery coffins, eight ossuaries, numerous oil lamps, as well as pottery, glass vessels, and several bronze objects was unearthed on HaHoresh Street. One of the ossuaries bears a Greek inscription indicating it belongs to Maia, the daughter or wife of a man named Saul.

=== Roman and Byzantine Empire ===
In 1930, remains of a 5th-century Jewish town, Husifah or Huseifa, were unearthed in Isfiya. Among the finds are a synagogue with a mosaic floor bearing Jewish symbols and the inscription "Peace upon Israel". A cache of 4,500 gold coins were found dating from the Roman period.

=== Middle Ages ===
Crusader remnants have been found in the village. Isfiya was mentioned as part of the domain of the Sultan during the hudna between the Crusaders based in Acre and the Mamluk sultan al-Mansur (Qalawun) declared in 1283.

=== Ottoman Empire ===
The Druze came to the village in the early eighteenth century. The inhabitants made their living from olive oil, honey and grapes.

Isfiya was one of only two villages remaining on Mount Carmel after the expulsion of Ibrahim Pasha in 1841. Seventeen other villages disappeared. The village's survival was attributed partly to "the exceptional valour" of the inhabitants, partly to buying protection from a local Galilee chief, Aqil Agha.

In 1859, the English consul Rogers estimated the population to be 400, who cultivated 20 feddans of land. In 1863, H.B. Tristram visited the village, which he described as Druze and Christian, with a Christian sheikh. Tristam noted that the women's clothing in this village were much like those of al-Bassa, being either "plain, patched or embroidered in the most fantastic and grotesque shapes". In 1870, the French explorer Victor Guérin found that the village had six hundred inhabitants, almost all Druze, with the exception of sixty, who belonged to the "Schismatic Greeks". Gardens were grown all around the village. Some houses seemed very old and dated, Guérin surmised, from the Middle Ages or even earlier, from the time of the Crusades.

In 1881 the Palestine Exploration Fund's Survey of Western Palestine described it as standing "on the highest part of the Carmel watershed, and the highest house was therefore the trigonometrical station on the ridge. It is a moderate-sized village of stone houses, with a well on the south-west. The inhabitants are all Druses. [..] Corn-land and olives surround the land." A population list from about 1887 showed that Isfiya had about 555 inhabitants; 480 Druze and 75 Catholic Christians. When a Jewish moshava was established at Mutallah (Metula) north of Safed in 1896, the Druze population resisted eviction until receiving a reasonable compensation in 1904; some relocated to Isfiya, including the Wahb family.

=== British Mandate ===
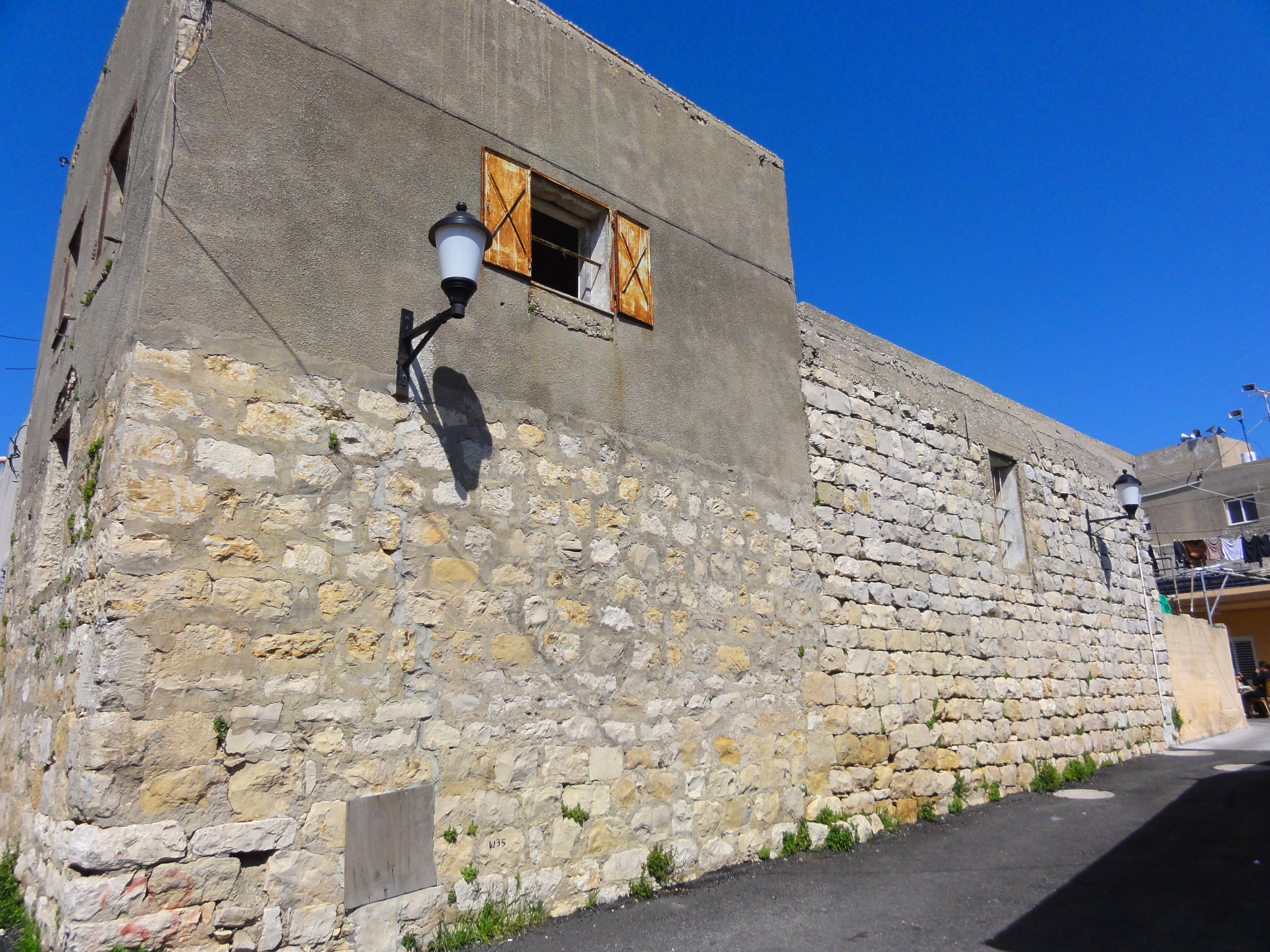
Isfiya old city.

In the 1922 census of Palestine conducted by the British Mandate authorities, Isfiya had a population of 733; 590 Druze, 17 Muslims and 126 Christians; the Christians broken down by denomination were six Orthodox, six Roman Catholics, 107 Greek Catholics (Melkites), and seven Maronites. At the time of the 1931 census, Isfiya had 251 occupied houses and a population of 742 Druzes, 187 Christians, and 176 Muslims; a total of 1,105. These counts included the smaller localities Damun Farm, Shallala Farm and al-Jalama.

In the 1945 statistics the population of Isfiya consisted of 1,790; 180 Muslims, 300 Christians and 1,310 classified as "others", that is, Druze, while the land area was 46,905 dunams, according to an official land and population survey. Of this, 1,103 dunams were designated for plantations and irrigable land, 17,357 for cereals, while 74 dunams were built-up (urban) areas.

During the 1936-39 Arab revolt in Palestine, the villagers initially supported a local rebel group led by Yusuf Abu Durra. However, after local leaders were abducted and murdered, the notables turned to the British, who destroyed the group. A Druze self-defense force was established that received arms from the British and sometimes coordinated its activities with local Jewish forces.

=== Israel ===
Volunteers from Isfiya fought in the IDF during the War of 1948. Since 1956 conscription of Druze men became mandatory. Isfiya was connected to water in 1960 and to electricity in 1963.

In 2022, the area of Isfiya was increased from 7,000 to 10,900 dunam.

== Climate ==
Isfiya has a mediterranean climate (Köppen climate classification: Csa). The average annual temperature is 18.7 °C (65.7 °F), and around 689 mm (27.13 in) of precipitation falls annually.

Climate data for Isfiya
Month	Jan	Feb	Mar	Apr	May	Jun	Jul	Aug	Sep	Oct	Nov	Dec	Year
Mean daily maximum °C (°F)	14.8 (58.6)	15.5 (59.9)	17.7 (63.9)	21.6 (70.9)	26.2 (79.2)	28.2 (82.8)	29.5 (85.1)	30.1 (86.2)	28.6 (83.5)	26.8 (80.2)	22.6 (72.7)	17.1 (62.8)	23.2 (73.8)
Daily mean °C (°F)	11.3 (52.3)	11.8 (53.2)	13.2 (55.8)	16.3 (61.3)	20.6 (69.1)	23.1 (73.6)	24.8 (76.6)	25.4 (77.7)	24 (75)	21.9 (71.4)	18.1 (64.6)	13.4 (56.1)	18.7 (65.6)
Mean daily minimum °C (°F)	7.8 (46.0)	8.2 (46.8)	8.8 (47.8)	11.1 (52.0)	15.1 (59.2)	18.1 (64.6)	20.1 (68.2)	20.8 (69.4)	19.5 (67.1)	17.1 (62.8)	13.7 (56.7)	9.8 (49.6)	14.2 (57.5)
Average precipitation mm (inches)	184 (7.2)	128 (5.0)	79 (3.1)	26 (1.0)	8 (0.3)	0 (0)	0 (0)	0 (0)	2 (0.1)	20 (0.8)	91 (3.6)	151 (5.9)	689 (27.1)

== Demographics ==
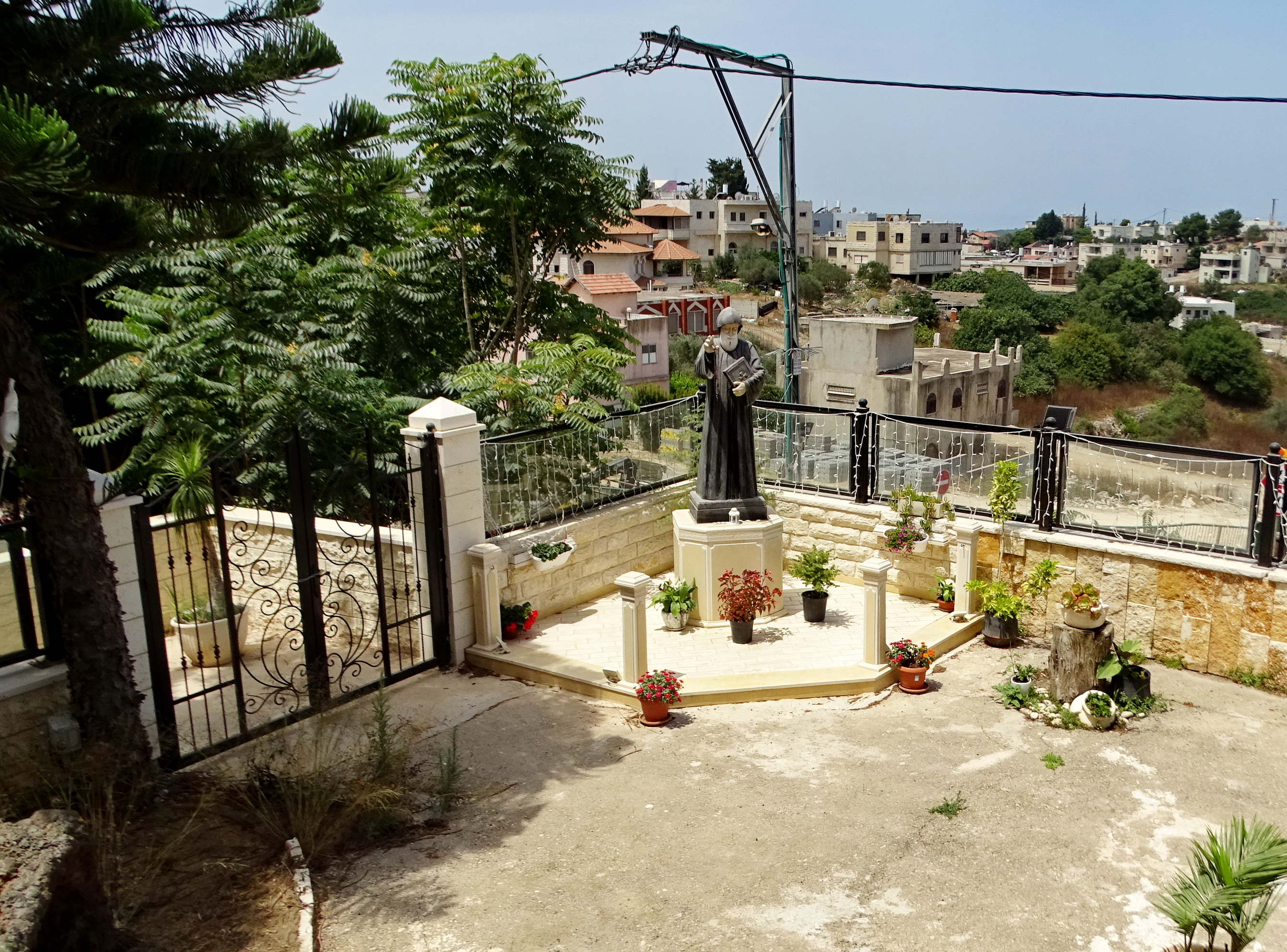
View from the Maronite Church of Isfiya.

77.1% of the population is Druze, 13.6% is Christian and 9.1% is Muslim. A few Jewish families also live there. The Christian population is mostly Melkite Catholic, with a few Maronite households.

== Landmarks ==
The tomb of Abu Abdallah is located in Isfiya. Abu Abdullah was one of three religious leaders chosen by Caliph Al-Hakem in 996 CE to proclaim the Druze faith. He is said to have been the first Druze religious judge (qadi). The Druze make an annual visit to this shrine on November 15.

== Economy ==
Isfiya and Daliyat al-Karmel joined Yokneam Illit and the Megiddo Regional Council to develop the Mevo Carmel Jewish-Arab Industrial Park to benefit from the existing high-tech ecosystem.

The economy of Isfiya is consistently growing as more tourists are visiting regularly, and more businesses are being opened.

== Voting Patterns ==
In the 2022 election, 70 percent of voters in Isfiya voted for the parties of the center-left coalition led by Yair Lapid, while 24 percent voted for the Arab parties and 4 percent voted for the parties of the right-wing coalition led by Benjamin Netanyahu.

In the 2026 election, 77 percent of voters in Isfiya voted for the parties of the center-left coalition led by Gadi Eisenkot, while 18 percent voted for the Arab parties and 4 percent voted for the parties of the right-wing coalition led by Benjamin Netanyahu. An additional 0.7 percent voted for the Reservists. Voter turnout increased 50 percent from the 2022 election.

== Notable people ==
- Zeidan Atashi
- Reda Mansour
- Mouna Maroun, neuroscientist and academic administrator
- Hiyam Qablan
- Mahran Lala, footballer

== See also ==
- Arab localities in Israel
- Druze in Israel
- Zodiac mosaics in ancient synagogues

== Bibliography ==
- Avi-Yonah, M.; Makhouly, N. (1934). "A sixth-century synagogue at 'Isfiya". Quarterly of the Department of Antiquities in Palestine. 3: 118–131.
- Barag, Dan (1979). "A new source concerning the ultimate borders of the Latin Kingdom of Jerusalem". Israel Exploration Journal. 29: 197–217.
- Barron, J.B., ed. (1923). Palestine: Report and General Abstracts of the Census of 1922. Government of Palestine.
- Conder, C.R.; Kitchener, H.H. (1881). The Survey of Western Palestine: Memoirs of the Topography, Orography, Hydrography, and Archaeology. Vol. 1. London: Committee of the Palestine Exploration Fund.
- Falah, Salman (1975). "A History of the Druze Settlements in Palestine during the Ottoman Period". In Maoz, Moshe (ed.). Studies on Palestine during the Ottoman Period. Jerusalem: Magnes Press. ISBN 9789652235893.
- Department of Statistics (1945). Village Statistics, April, 1945. Government of Palestine.
- Guérin, V. (1875). Description Géographique Historique et Archéologique de la Palestine (in French). Vol. 2: Samarie, pt. 2. Paris: L'Imprimerie Nationale.
- Hadawi, S. (1970). Village Statistics of 1945: A Classification of Land and Area ownership in Palestine. Palestine Liberation Organization Research Center.
- Mills, E., ed. (1932). Census of Palestine 1931. Population of Villages, Towns and Administrative Areas. Jerusalem: Government of Palestine.
- Oren, Eliran (2008-12-04). "'Isfiya" (120). Hadashot Arkheologiyot – Excavations and Surveys in Israel.
- Palmer, E.H. (1881). The Survey of Western Palestine: Arabic and English Name Lists Collected During the Survey by Lieutenants Conder and Kitchener, R. E. Transliterated and Explained by E.H. Palmer. Committee of the Palestine Exploration Fund.
- Schumacher, G. (1888). "Population list of the Liwa of Akka". Quarterly Statement - Palestine Exploration Fund. 20: 169–191.
- Tristram, H.B. (1865). Land of Israel, A Journal of travel in Palestine, undertaken with special reference to its physical character. London: Society for Promoting Christian Knowledge.
- Weir, Shelagh (1989). Palestinian Costume. British Museum Publications Ltd. ISBN 0-7141-2517-2.
