= Carmel City =

City in Israel

Carmel City: עִיר הַכַּרְמֶל; مدينة الكرمل
- City

Hebrew transcription(s)
  - Also spelled: Ir Karmel (unofficial)
- Location within Haifa region of Israel
- Coordinates: 32°41′37″N 35°02′27″E
- Country: Israel
- District: Haifa
- Founded: 2003
- Disestablished: 2008

Government
  - Mayor: Dr. Akram Hasson

Area
  - Total: 15,561 dunams (15.561 km^{2}; 6.008 sq mi)

Population (2007)
  - Total: 24,900
  - Density: 1,600/km^{2} (4,140/sq mi)

Carmel City (Hebrew: עִיר הַכַּרְמֶל, Ir HaKarmel; Arabic: مدينة الكرمل Madīnat al-Karmel) was a short-lived city in the Haifa District of Israel, named after its location on Mount Carmel.

== History ==
In 2003 Interior Minister Avraham Poraz announced plans to combine several local councils. The two Druze towns of Daliyat al-Karmel and Isfiya were merged to become one city, initially known as Daliyat al-Karmel-Isfiya, later renamed to Carmel City in 2005.

However, the merger was opposed by many residents. Residents did not adopt the new city, instead continued to refer to themselves as being from Daliyat al-Karmel or Isfiya. The most vocal opposition was from Isfiya, and in February 2008 residents announced their intention to join the Kadima party in order to eliminate the Kadima leadership via primaries, and cancel the merger.

On 5 November 2008, the Knesset approved the cancellation of the merger before the 2008 municipal elections on 11 November, although the separation only took effect on 1 December 2008, and new elections were held in June 2009. The two original towns returned to being separate local councils.

== Politics ==
Carmel City's first and only mayor was Akram Hasson. At the interim period between the approval of the split and new elections former general Gabi Ophir was appointed as mayor.

== Demographics ==
According to the Israel Central Bureau of Statistics (CBS), Carmel City's population at the end of 2007 was 24,900, with a Druze majority, and a Christian minority.

== See also ==
- Arab localities in Israel
- Druze in Israel
