= Hellab =

Hellab هلاب
- Village
- Location within Iran
- Coordinates: 32°36′00″N 51°00′00″E
- Country: Iran
- Province: Isfahan
- County: Tiran and Karvan
- Bakhsh: Central
- Rural District: Rezvaniyeh

Population (2006)
  - Total: 45
- Time zone: UTC+3:30 (IRST)
  - Summer (DST): UTC+4:30 (IRDT)

Hellab (Persian: هلاب, also Romanized as Hellāb, Halāb, Ḩallāb, and Hel Āb) is a village in Rezvaniyeh Rural District, in the Central District of Tiran and Karvan County, Isfahan Province, Iran. At the 2006 census, its population was 45, in 17 families.
