= Bisi Akin-Alabi =

Nigerian educator and social worker

- Born: Oyo State
- Citizenship: Nigerian
- Education: University of Lagos; Federal school of art and science
- Occupation: Educationist

Bisi Akin-Alabi is a Nigerian education expert, social worker, administrator, technocrat, education consultant and former special adviser on education, science and technology to Senator Abiola Ajimobi, the former governor of Oyo state, Nigeria.

== Early life and education ==
Bisi Akin-Alabiwas born in Igbo-Ora, Oyo State, to a Nigerian father who was a paramedic and a Beninese mother from Porto-Novo. She attended Federal School of Arts and Science. She holds a Bachelor of Science degree from the University of Lagos and Master of Business administration from London South Bank University.

She also holds Postgraduate Certificate in Education from the Roehampton Institute, University of Surrey and a Ph.D in child development and humanities from London Graduate School. She is a fellow of the International Chartered Management Consultant, Chartered Institute of Commerce of Nigeria (FCICN), Fellow of the Windsor Fellowship UK and United Kingdom Strategic Society.

In March 2001, at 10 Downing Street, London, she was honoured by the then British Prime Minister Tony Blair and his wife Cherie Blair in recognition of her contributions to education and childcare in United Kingdom.

== Career ==
Akin-Alabi was a science and mathematics teacher in mainstream schools in the United Kingdom for more than two decades. She is the founder of SchoolRun Academy and the publisher of SchoolRun Magazine. She served as a special adviser to Senator Abiola Ajimobi, the former governor of Oyo State, Nigeria.

In 2017, Akin-Alabi conceptualized the Oyo State Model Education System Interventions, OYOMESI. The programme led to the adoption of Ibadan as United Nations Educational, Scientific and Cultural Organization (UNESCO) learning city.
