= Abiodun Alabi =

Nigerian police chief

Abiodun Sylvester Alabi
- Born: 31 December 1964 (age 61); Ilawe Ekiti
- Education: University of Lagos
- Occupation: Commissioner of Police
- Employer: Nigerian Police Force

Abiodun Sylvester Alabi (born 31 December 1964 in Ilawe Ekiti) is a Nigerian policeman. He is a Deputy Inspector-General of Police (DIG) of the Nigeria Police Force.

== Education and career ==
Alabi earned a bachelor's degree in Sociology from the University of Lagos in 1986, and a master’s degree in the same discipline from Obafemi Awolowo University, Ile-Ife in 1989. He was enlisted into the Nigeria Police Force in March 1990 as a cadet officer.

In January 2022, Alabi replaced Hakeem Odumosu as the Lagos State Commissioner of Police. He had previously served as the Commissioner of Police for Bauchi State, as well as the Commissioner of Police in charge of Central Criminal Registry, Force Criminal Investigation Department Annex, Alagbon, Lagos. He was a former Deputy Commissioner of Police in Taraba and Ekiti State, and a former Assistant Commissioner of Police of the elite Police Mobile Force. In 2001, he also served with the United Nations Mission in Kosovo (UNMIK).

Alabi is a fellow of the Nigerian National Defence College and a member of Nigeria Institute of Management. He is also a member of the International Association of Chiefs of Police.
