= Daliyat al-Karmel =

Druze town in Israel

Daliat al-Karmel: דאלית אל-כרמל; دالية الكرمل
- Local council
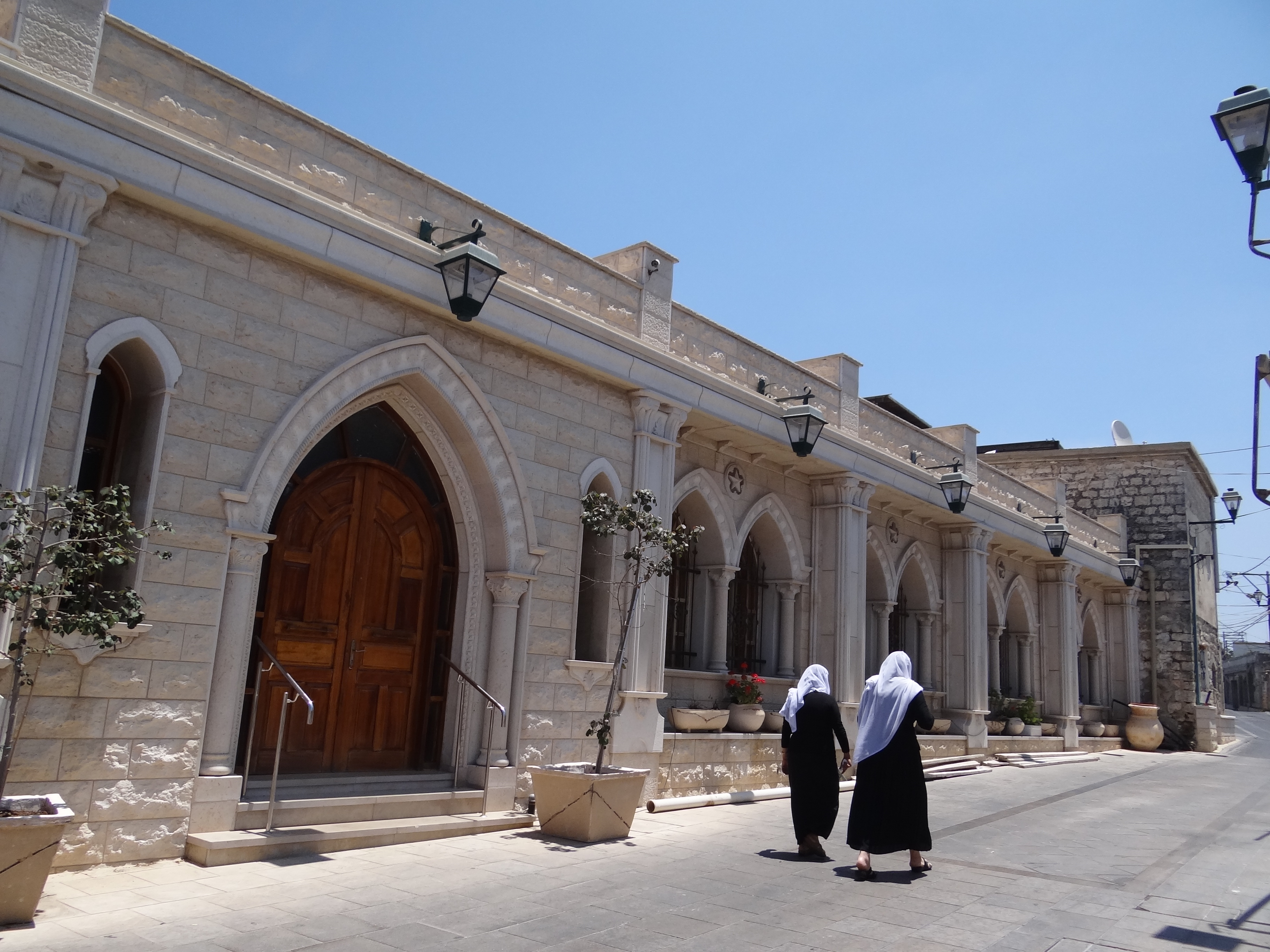
- Abu Ibrahim Shrine

- Location within Haifa region of Israel Location within Israel
- Coordinates: 32°41′35″N 35°02′58″E
- Grid position: 154/233 ISR
- Country: Israel
- District: Haifa
- Subdistrict: Haifa

Government
  - Head of Municipality: Rafik Halabi
  - Acting Municipality: Nissim Abu Hamad

Area
  - Total: 15,561 dunams (15.561 km^{2}; 6.008 sq mi)

Population (2024)
  - Total: 18,190
  - Density: 1,169/km^{2} (3,028/sq mi)

Ethnicity
  - Arabs: 99.6%
  - Jews and others: 0.4%
- Name meaning: "The hanging vine of Carmel

Daliyat al-Karmel (Arabic: دالية الكرمل; Hebrew: דאלית אל-כרמל, "vineyards (دالية) of Carmel") is a Druze town located on Mount Carmel in the Haifa District of Israel, around 20 km southeast of Haifa. In 2024 its population was 18,001. The town is known for its colorful market.

== History ==
In 1870 a local guide showed French explorer Victor Guérin extensive ruins located south of Daliyat al-Karmel, called Khirbet Doubel. The ruins were the most extensive on Mount Carmel. Guérin thought it might be the town on Mt. Carmel mentioned by Pliny. Conder and Kitchener of the Palestine Exploration Fund surveyed the area and noted "traces of ruins" at a place SE of the village centre called Dubil. Later excavations have found remains there from Iron Age I, Early Roman and Byzantine periods, together with pottery from first century to the second–third centuries CE. Although inconclusive, Lieutenant Conder thought that Daliyat al-Karmel was to be identified with the biblical Idalah (Joshua 19:15).

=== Middle Ages ===
In 1283 both Daliyat al-Karmel and Kh. Doubel (just south of Daliyat al-Karmel) were mentioned as part of the domain of the Crusaders, according to the hudna between the Crusaders in Acre and the Mamluk sultan Qalawun.

=== Ottoman Empire ===
Mount Carmel was progressively settled by Druze beginning in the early 17th century, when a large part of Palestine came under the jurisdiction of Fakhr al-Din II, the paramount Druze strongman of Mount Lebanon and Ottoman governor of the Sidon-Beirut and Safad districts. Druze from the Yamani tribo-political faction may have also migrated to Mount Carmel from Mount Lebanon in the aftermath of the Battle of Ain Dara in 1711, though most of the migration was directed to the Jabal Hauran. Six out of the eight Druze villages established on Mount Carmel were abandoned or destroyed during Egyptian rule in the Levant (1831–1840). The local accounts recorded by Laurence Oliphant, who built himself a summer house in Daliyat al-Karmil in the 1880s, hold that the villages were abandoned for Jabal Hauran due to the oppressive rule of the governor Ibrahim Pasha, while Conder noted that the villages were destroyed by Ibrahim Pasha. Daliyat al-Karmil and Isfiya were the sole Druze settlements left standing on Mount Carmel. The local traditions trace Daliyat al-Karmel's founding to the 18th century when a Druze family from Jabal al-A'la near Aleppo settled on ancient ruins in the village. Successive waves of Druze families from Jabal al-A'la followed and together they formed the Halaby ("Aleppine") clan. Until today the Halaby clan of the town speaks in the Aleppine Arabic dialect rather than the Palestinian dialect.

In 1870 Guérin found four hundred Druze inhabitants in Daliyat al-Karmel. The houses were mostly built of adobe, with only a few stone houses. The locals worshiped inside a cave, where the explorer was not allowed. In 1881 the Palestine Exploration Fund's Survey of Western Palestine described the village as a "stone village of moderate size on a knoll of one of the spurs running out of the main watershed of Carmel. On the south there is a well, and fine springs on the west, near Umm esh Shukf. On the north is a little plain or open valley cultivated with corn (Merjat ed Dalieh). The inhabitants are all Druses." A population list from about 1887 showed that Daliyat al-Karmel had about 620 inhabitants, all Druze.

=== British Mandate ===
In the 1922 census of Palestine conducted by the British Mandate authorities, Daliyat al-Karmel had a population of 993; 921 Druse and 21 Christians, increasing in the 1931 census when Daliyat al-Karmel, together Deir el Muhraqa and Khirbat al-Mansura had a total population of 1,173, of whom 1,154 were Druze, 11 were Christians and 8 were Muslims, living in a total of 236 houses. In the 1945 statistics the population of Daliyat al-Karmel consisted of 2,060 Arabs, (20 Christians and 2,040 Druze). The land area was 31,730 dunams, according to an official land and population survey, of which 1,506 dunams were designated for plantations and irrigable land, 18,174 for cereals, and 60 were built-up (urban) areas.

=== Israel ===
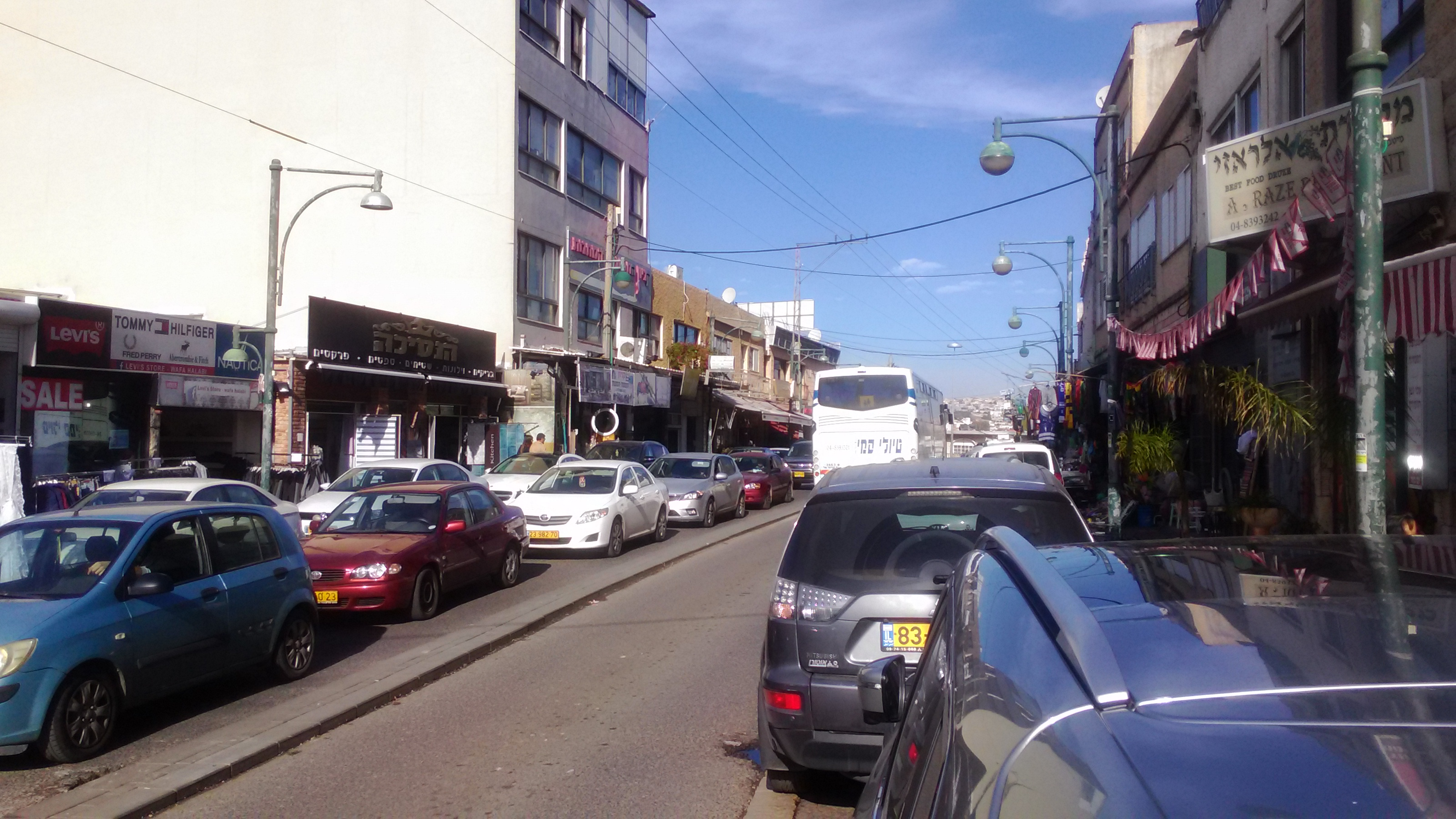
Main street of Daliyat al-Karmel

An Israeli census conducted in November 1948 found 2,932 residents. At the end of 1951 the figure dropped to 2,769. The town was granted local council status that year.

In 2003 Daliyat al-Karmel was merged with Isfiya to form Carmel City. In 2008, the communities became separate once again. In 2007, Daliyat al-Karmel signed a partnership agreement with Ungheni, Moldova. In 2008, the Ambassador of Moldova, Larisa Miculet visited Daliyat al-Karmel at the invitation of the mayor, Akram Hasson. In 2010, El Al, Israel's national airline, named one of its Boeing 767 airplanes Daliyat al-Karmel. Sheikh Muafak Tarif, leader of the Druze community, was presented with a miniature model of the plane at a special ceremony.

In 2012, a tennis school financed by the Freddie Krivine Foundation opened in Daliyat al-Karmel and 12 youngsters took part in a weekly co-existence program with children at the Israel Tennis Center in Yokneam. In 2022, the Jewish American Society for Historic Preservation gifted to Daliyat al Karmel an interpretive sculpture by noted Jerusalem artist Sam Philipe titled The Flame of Friendship. The city prominently sited the sculpture at the Policeman's Circle. The dedication plate reads, The Flame of Friendship - Honor, Respect, Commonality.

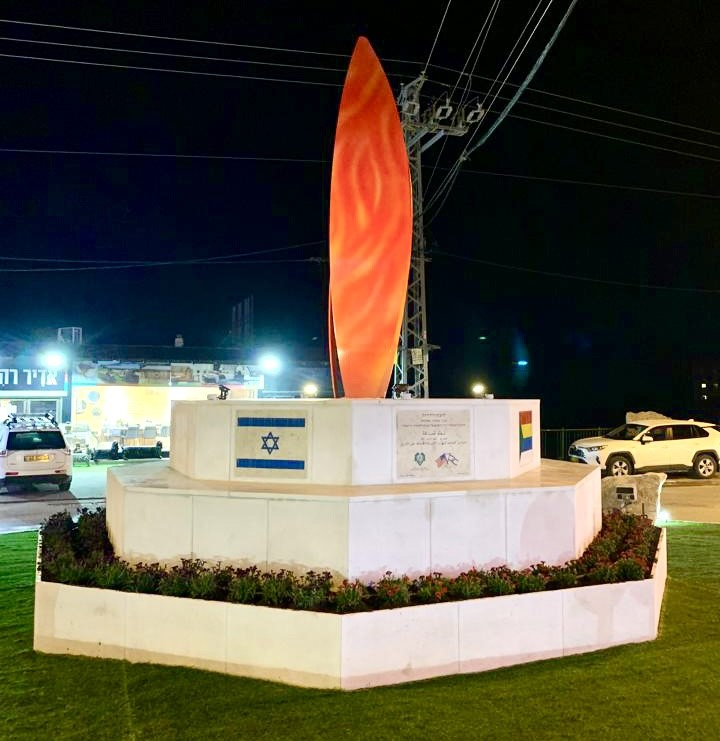
Gift to the Druze community from the Jewish American Society for Historic Preservation

== Demography ==
According to Israel Central Bureau of Statistics, in 2016 Daliyat al-Karmel's population was 17,000. The majority of residents are Druze (97.2%), with Muslim (2.7%) and Christian (0.1%) minorities.

== Landmarks ==
=== Abu Ibrahim shrine ===
The shrine of Abu Ibrahim, whom the Druze consider a prophet, is in the oldest part of the town.

=== Laurence Oliphant House ===
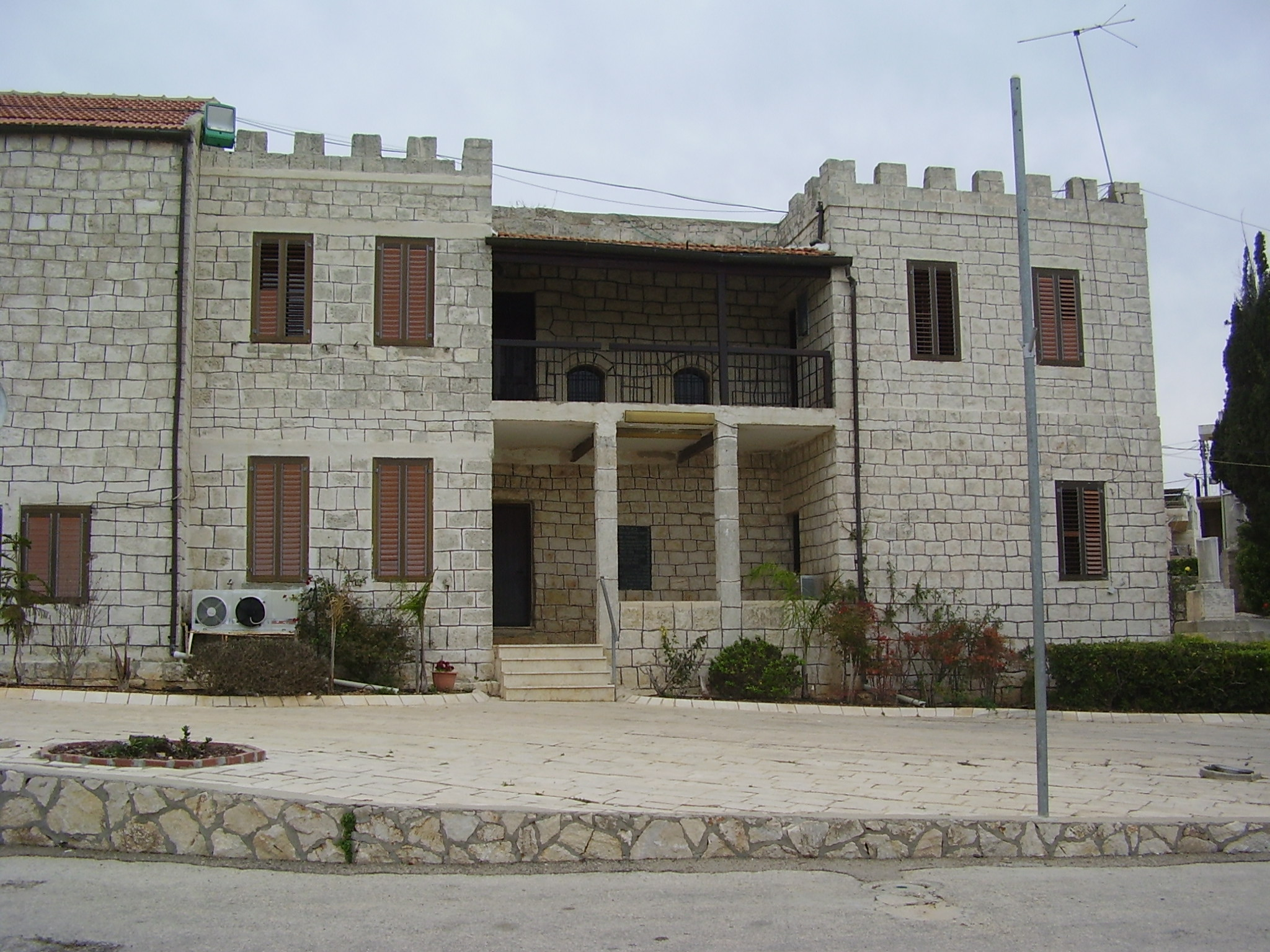
Laurence Oliphant House

Close by the Abu Ibrahim shrine is the home of Sir Laurence Oliphant, who spent his summers there in the 1880s with his wife Alice, and his secretary Naftali Herz Imber. The building functions as a museum, the Druze Memorial Center, commemorating the 505 Druze IDF soldiers who have died in the line of duty since 1948.

Sir Laurence Oliphant, was a South African-born British author, traveller, diplomat, British intelligence agent, Christian mystic, and Christian Zionist. His best known book in his lifetime was a satirical novel, Piccadilly (1870).

=== Muhraqa Carmelite Monastery ===
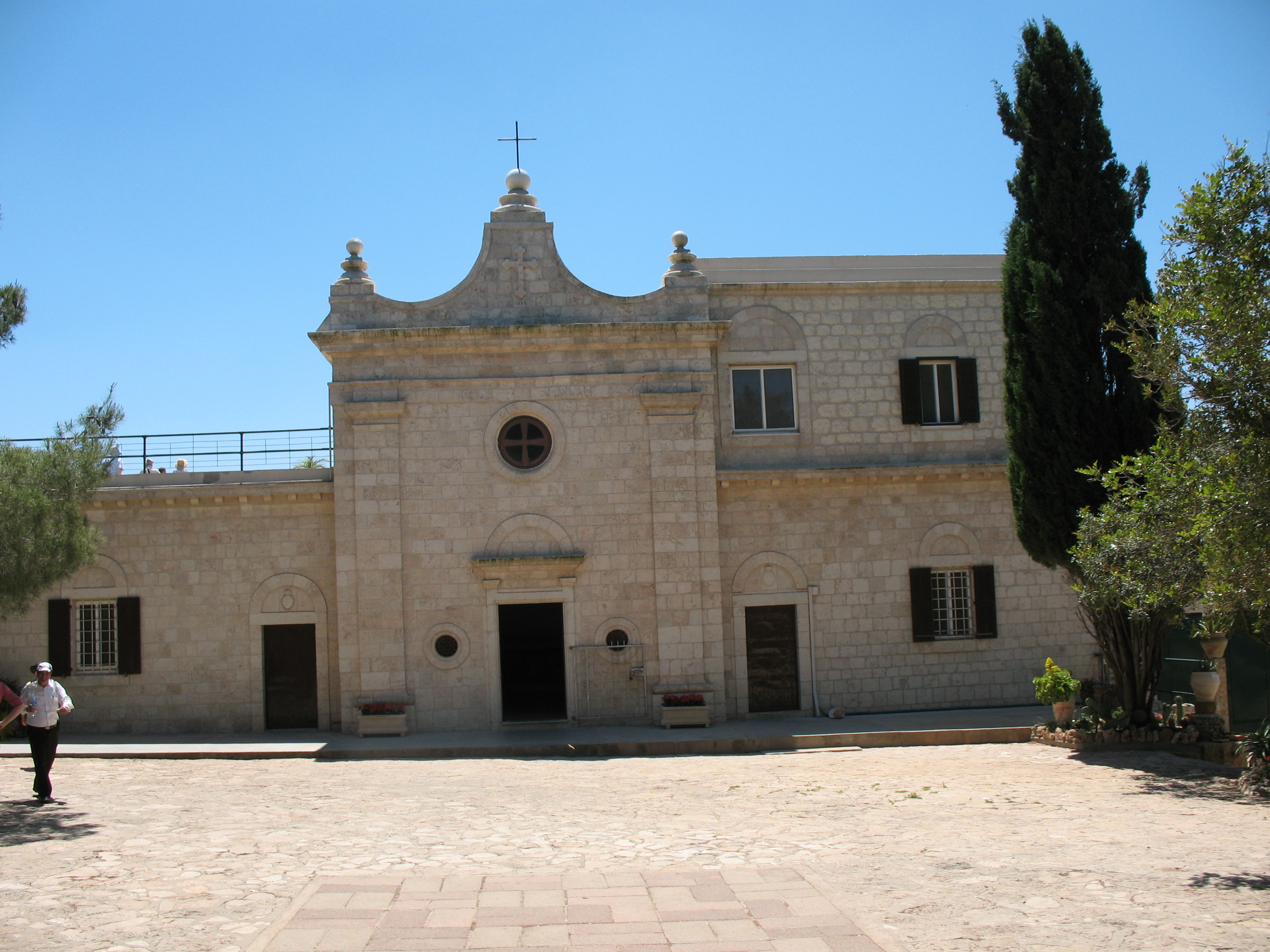
Muhraqa Carmelite Monastery

The Catholic Muhraqa Monastery is located 2 kilometres southeast of Dalyat al-Karmel and marks the contest between prophet Elijah and the priests of Ba'al. It belongs to the Carmelite Order. Also the Catholic complex includes a chapel that was built in 1883, and gardens which includes a Virgin Mary Statue, and the lodgings of monks from the Carmelite Order.

=== Druze Heritage Center ===
The Carmel Center for Druze Heritage is a hands-on museum of the history, religion and culture of the Druze.

=== Garden of the Mothers ===
In 2011, the Garden of the Mothers was inaugurated in Daliyat al-Karmel, symbolizing the sisterhood of Christian, Druze, Jewish, and Muslim women who work together in northern Israel. Forty-four trees were planted in memory of the 44 Israel Prison Services personnel who died in the 2010 Mount Carmel forest fire.

== Economy ==
Daliyat al-Karmel and Isfiya joined Yokneam Illit and the Megiddo Regional Council to develop the Mevo Carmel Jewish-Arab Industrial Park to benefit from the existing high-tech ecosystem.

== Voting patterns ==
In the 2022 election, 90 percent of voters in Daliyat al-Karmel voted for the parties of the center-left coalition led by Yair Lapid, while 5 percent voted for the Arab parties and 3 percent voted for the parties of the right-wing coalition led by Benjamin Netanyahu.

In the 2026 election, 81 percent of voters in Daliyat al-Karmel voted for the parties of the center-left coalition led by Gadi Eisenkot, while 11 percent voted for the parties of the right-wing coalition led by Benjamin Netanyahu and 6 percent voted for the Arab parties. An additional 1.9 percent voted for the Reservists, and 0.3 percent voted for Amcha Yisrael. Voter turnout increased 31 percent from the 2022 election.

== Notable people ==
- Amal Nasser el-Din, former Likud MK
- Majdi Halabi, Israeli missing soldier
- Ayoob Kara, Likud MK
- Gadeer Mreeh, MK
- Rami Zeedan, Professor
- Ehsan Daxa, Israeli colonel

== See also ==
- Arab localities in Israel
- Druze in Israel

== Bibliography ==
- Al-Haj, Majid; Rosenfeld, Henry (1990). Arab Local Government in Israel. Westview Press. ISBN 0-8133-7761-7.
- Barag, Dan (1979). "A new source concerning the ultimate borders of the Latin Kingdom of Jerusalem". Israel Exploration Journal. 29: 197–217.
- Barron, J.B., ed. (1923). Palestine: Report and General Abstracts of the Census of 1922. Government of Palestine.
- Ben-Zvi, I. (1954). "The Druze Community in Israel". Israel Exploration Journal. 4 (2): 65–76. JSTOR 27924560.
- Conder, C.R.; Kitchener, H.H. (1881). The Survey of Western Palestine: Memoirs of the Topography, Orography, Hydrography, and Archaeology. Vol. 1. London: Committee of the Palestine Exploration Fund.
- Firro, Kais (1992). A History of the Druzes. Vol. 1. Brill. ISBN 9004094377.
- Firro, Kais (1999). The Druzes in the Jewish State: A Brief History. Leiden and New York: Brill. ISBN 90-04-11251-0.
- Department of Statistics (1945). Village Statistics, April, 1945. Government of Palestine.
- Golan, Sigal (7 June 2009). Horbat Devela, Final Report (Report). Hadashot Arkheologiyot – Excavations and Surveys in Israel.
- Guérin, V. (1875). Description Géographique Historique et Archéologique de la Palestine (in French). Vol. 2: Samarie, pt. 2. Paris: L'Imprimerie Nationale.
- Hadawi, S. (1970). Village Statistics of 1945: A Classification of Land and Area ownership in Palestine. Palestine Liberation Organization Research Center.
- Mills, E., ed. (1932). Census of Palestine 1931. Population of Villages, Towns and Administrative Areas. Jerusalem: Government of Palestine.
- Mülinen, Egbert Friedrich von 1908, Beiträge zur Kenntnis des Karmels "Separateabdruck aus der Zeitschrift des Deutschen Palëstina-Vereins Band XXX (1907) Seite 117-207 und Band XXXI (1908) Seite 1-258." ("Daliet el-kirmil": p. 242 ff. )
- Palmer, E.H. (1881). The Survey of Western Palestine: Arabic and English Name Lists Collected During the Survey by Lieutenants Conder and Kitchener, R. E. Transliterated and Explained by E.H. Palmer. Committee of the Palestine Exploration Fund.
- Schumacher, G. (1888). "Population list of the Liwa of Akka". Quarterly Statement - Palestine Exploration Fund. 20: 169–191.
- Shadman, Amit (2 July 2006). Horbat Devela, Final Report (Report). Hadashot Arkheologiyot – Excavations and Surveys in Israel.
