= List of Israeli universities and colleges =

As of January 2026, there are eleven universities and 53 colleges in Israel, which are recognized and academically supervised by the Council for Higher Education in Israel. As many course offerings are varied, Israeli universities are considered to be of top quality, and they are inexpensive to attend. Israel's quality university education is largely responsible for spurring the country's high tech boom and rapid economic development.

The primary differentiator between a 'university' and a 'college' in Israel is that only a university can confer doctorate degrees, and therefore tends to be more research-oriented than the more teaching-oriented colleges.

== Universities ==
Israel's universities are listed below, followed by their English acronym, establishment date, location, latest data about the number of students and the institute's academic rank of the top world universities, according to WebOMetrics (top 3000), Shanghai Jiao Tong University (SJTU) (top 500) and The Times Higher Education Supplement (THES) (top 200), Academic Ranking of World Universities also known as the Shanghai Ranking (ARWU):

Institute	Est. Date	Type	Location	Students	World Academic Rank (WebOMetrics, SJTU, THES, ARWU)
Technion - Israel Institute of Technology (IIT)	1912	Public	Haifa	15,000 (2024)	101–150, 102–150, 301–350, 79
Hebrew University of Jerusalem (HUJI)	1918	Public	Jerusalem	23,500 (2023)	131, 59, 178, 86
Weizmann Institute of Science (WIS)	1934	Public	Rehovot	2,500 (2012)	346, 102–150, N/A, 68
Bar-Ilan University (BIU)	1952	Public	Ramat Gan	27,400 (2024)	570, 305–401, N/A, 401-500
Tel Aviv University (TAU)	1958	Public	Tel Aviv-Yafo	30,000 (2024)	266, 102–150, 201–250, 201-300
University of Haifa (HU)	1963	Public	Haifa	18,000 (2024)	510, 401–500, N/A, 601-700
Ben-Gurion University of the Negev (BGU)	1969	Public	Be'er Sheva	19,000 (2010)	448, 203–304, N/A, 501-600
Open University of Israel (OPENU)	1974	Public	Ra'anana	48,000 (2014)	1893, N/A, N/A
Ariel University^{1} (AU)	1982	Public	Ariel	14,000 (2012)	N/A, N/A, N/A, N/A
Reichman University (RU)	2021	Private	Herzliya	8,000 (2021)	N/A
Kiryat Shmona University (UKS)	2026	Public	Kiryat Shmona	3,545 (2020)	N/A

Most universities offer the full range of graduate and undergraduate degrees: Bachelor's degrees, Master's degrees, and doctorates. However, the Weizmann Institute does not grant bachelor's degrees.

== Colleges ==
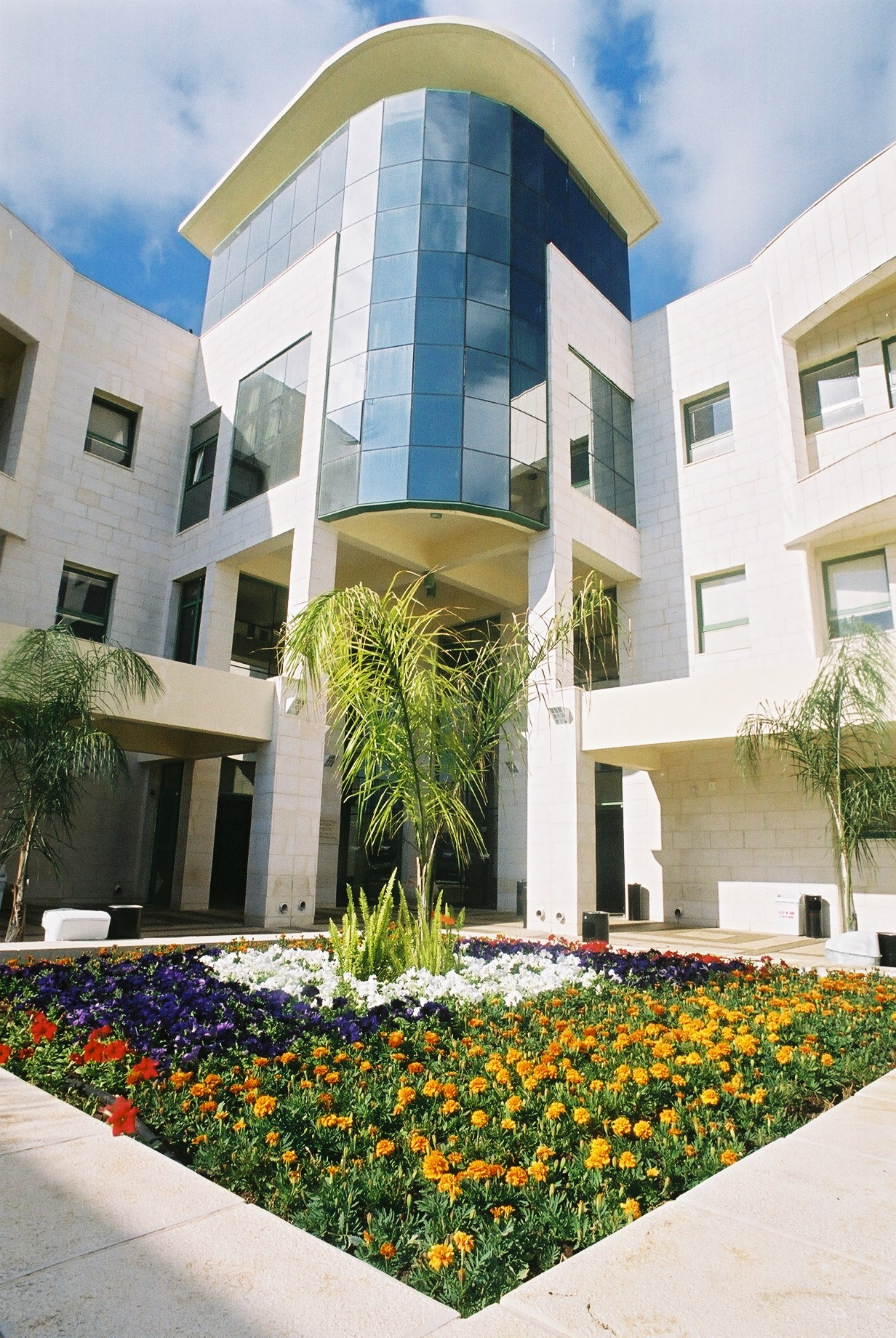
ORT Braude College of Engineering

Other institutes of higher education that are accredited by CHEI to confer a bachelor's (and in some cases a master's) degree are known as colleges (Hebrew: מִכְלָלָה Mikhlala; pl. מכללות Mikhlalot). There are also over twenty teacher training colleges, most of which will award only the Bachelor of Education (B.Ed.).

Colleges:

- College of Law and Business, Ramat Gan
- Academic College of Tel Aviv-Yafo
- Afeka College of Engineering, Tel Aviv
- Ashkelon Academic College
- Bezalel Academy of Art and Design, Jerusalem
- Carmel Academic Center, Haifa (Closed)
- Center for Academic Studies, Or Yehuda
- College of Management Academic Studies (COMAS), Rishon LeZion
- Dan Academic Center, Petah Tikva
- Kfar-Avraham Technology College, Petah Tikva (Closed)
- high tech College of tel aviv (H-college)
- Holon Institute of Technology
- Torah Olamit: Israeli Virtual College of Noedical Studies, Jerusalem
- Jerusalem Academy of Music and Dance
- Jerusalem College of Engineering
- Jerusalem College of Technology
- Jerusalem Multidisciplinary College
- Kinneret Academic College
- Lander Institute, Jerusalem
- Max Stern Academic College of Emek Yezreel
- Mivhar College, Bnei Brak
- Neri Bloomfeld School of Design and Education, Haifa
- Netanya Academic College
- Netanya Academic College of Law
- Ono Academic College, Kiryat Ono
- ORT Braude College of Engineering, Karmiel
- Peres Academic Center, Rehovot
- Ruppin Academic Center
- Sapir Academic College
- Sami Shamoon College of Engineering, Beersheba and Ashdod
- Sha'arei Mishpat College, Hod HaSharon
- Shalem College, Jerusalem
- Shenkar College of Engineering and Design, Ramat Gan
- Tel-Hai Academic College
- Western Galilee College, Acre
- Yehuda Regional College, Kiryat Arba^{1}
- Zefat Academic College, Safed

The teacher training colleges include:

- Ahva Academic College, Ahva
- Al-Qasemi Academic College of Education, Baqa al-Gharbiyye
- Arab College for Education, Haifa
- Beit Berl College, Kfar Saba
- College of Technology Education, Tel Aviv
- David Yellin College of Education, Jerusalem
- Efrata College of Education, Jerusalem
- Emuna College of Education, Jerusalem
- Givat Washington College of Education, Givat Washington
- Gordon College of Education, Haifa
- Hemdat College of Education, Netivot
- Herzog College, Alon Shvut^{1}
- Jerusalem Michlala, Jerusalem
- Kaye Academic College of Education, Beersheba
- Kibbutzim College, Tel Aviv
- Levinsky-Wingate Academic College, Tel Aviv
- Lifshitz College of Education, Jerusalem
- MOFET Institute, Consortium of Colleges of Education
- Moreshet Yaakov Religious College of Education, Rehovot
- Ohalo College, Katzrin (Golan Heights)^{1}
- Oranim Academic College, Kiryat Tivon
- Ort College for Teachers of Technology, Tel Aviv
- Shaanan Religious College of Education, Haifa
- Talpiot College of Education, Tel Aviv
- WIZO Haifa Academy of Design and Education, Haifa

^{1}Located in the Israeli occupied territories

=== Non-degree post-secondary education schools ===
The Ministry of Education has also certified certain institutions to award Professional Certificates instead of academic degrees. These include certificates in technology and in the performing arts.

- Beersheba Tehni School combines secondary military preparation with post-secondary practical engineer certification to qualify engineers for service in the Israel Air Force
- Beit Zvi School of the Performing Arts, Ramat Gan
- Sam Spiegel Film and Television School, Jerusalem

=== Non-Israeli certified Colleges ===
Several colleges – primarily religious institutions – operate in Israel that are not certified by the CHEI, but rather are accredited by international bodies outside of Israel.

- Bethlehem Bible College includes a campus within Israel at Nazareth, as well as two campuses in the Palestinian Authority at Bethlehem and Gaza, accredited by Asia Theological Association and Middle East Association of Theological Education
- Israel College of the Bible, Netanya
- Jerusalem University College
- Nazareth Evangelical College
- Reidman College, Tel Aviv, Jerusalem, Haifa, Beersheba, Eilat, Kinneret, and Misgav, offers alternative medicine certificates not recognized by the Ministry of Education, and offers a BA degree in Chinese Medicine through Zhejiang Chinese Medical University

== Foreign university campuses ==
The following foreign colleges and universities maintain international branch campuses in Israel:

- Brigham Young University – the BYU Jerusalem Center
- Hebrew Union College-Jewish Institute of Religion
- Hillsong College, in conjunction with Hillsong Church Israel
- NYU, which enrolls the largest number of Jewish students of any public or private university in the United States, and is ranked in the top 34 globally in all major publications of university rankings, has a campus in Tel Aviv.
- Touro University offers courses in Jerusalem, but a degree must be completed in New York
- University of Indianapolis
- Yeshiva University

== See also ==
- Education in Israel
- Mechina
- National Institute for Testing and Evaluation
