= Academic grading in Israel =

Academic grading in Israel refers to the main grading scale used in Israeli schools. The scale, from 0 to 100, is employed at virtually all levels of education in Israel, from elementary school, through high school and undergraduate academic studies, to graduate university degrees.

The 100-point grading scale sometimes used is as follows:

Percentage	Description	Letter grade equivalent
95–100	מצוין (Excellent)	A+
85–94	טוב מאוד (Very good)	A-
75–84	טוב (Good)	B+
65–74	כמעט טוב (Almost good)	B-
60–64; 55–64	מספיק (Sufficient)	C+
45–54	מספיק בקושי (Barely sufficient (usually means failed))	C-
<45	בלתי מספיק/נכשל (Insufficient/Failed)	F

In many schools and universities, percentage-based grading is directly used without such partitions. This grading scheme is similar to the one used in India. It has the advantages of being precise and having a simple method of calculating GPA (a simple/weighted average of grades).

In secondary school (years 7–12), any grade below 55 is considered a failing grade. In the Bagrut examinations, any grade below 55 equals failure. In most universities and colleges, any grade below 60 is considered as failure.

In Israeli academic institutions, honors are usually bestowed upon graduates with 88 or better, with summa cum laude associated with a grade of 95 or higher, although some institutions have different practices.

The Israeli education system rarely employs curved grading at any stage (including at the academic level). To compensate for this, most academic institutions require that candidates undergo the Psychometric Entrance Test, which in Israel provides examinees with an overall score of 200–800, the average being 535.

== Law school grading ==
Although the vast majority of Israeli academic institutions refrain from grading on a curve, the situation is different with law schools; only certain law faculties do not use curved grading. In most Israeli universities' and colleges' law faculties, the average grade is "normalized" to around 75 (i.e., 75/100 or B+ on a lettered GPA scale).

Different Institutes vary in their grading systems. "Insufficient" usually refers to "54" although, in some Institutes it might be lower or higher (up to even 64 for Medical School).

== See also ==
- Bagrut
- Education in Israel
