= Azrieli College of Engineering Jerusalem =

College in Jerusalem

Coordinates: 31°46′7.56″N 35°11′37.84″E

- עזריאלי-מכללה אקדמית להנדסה ירושלים
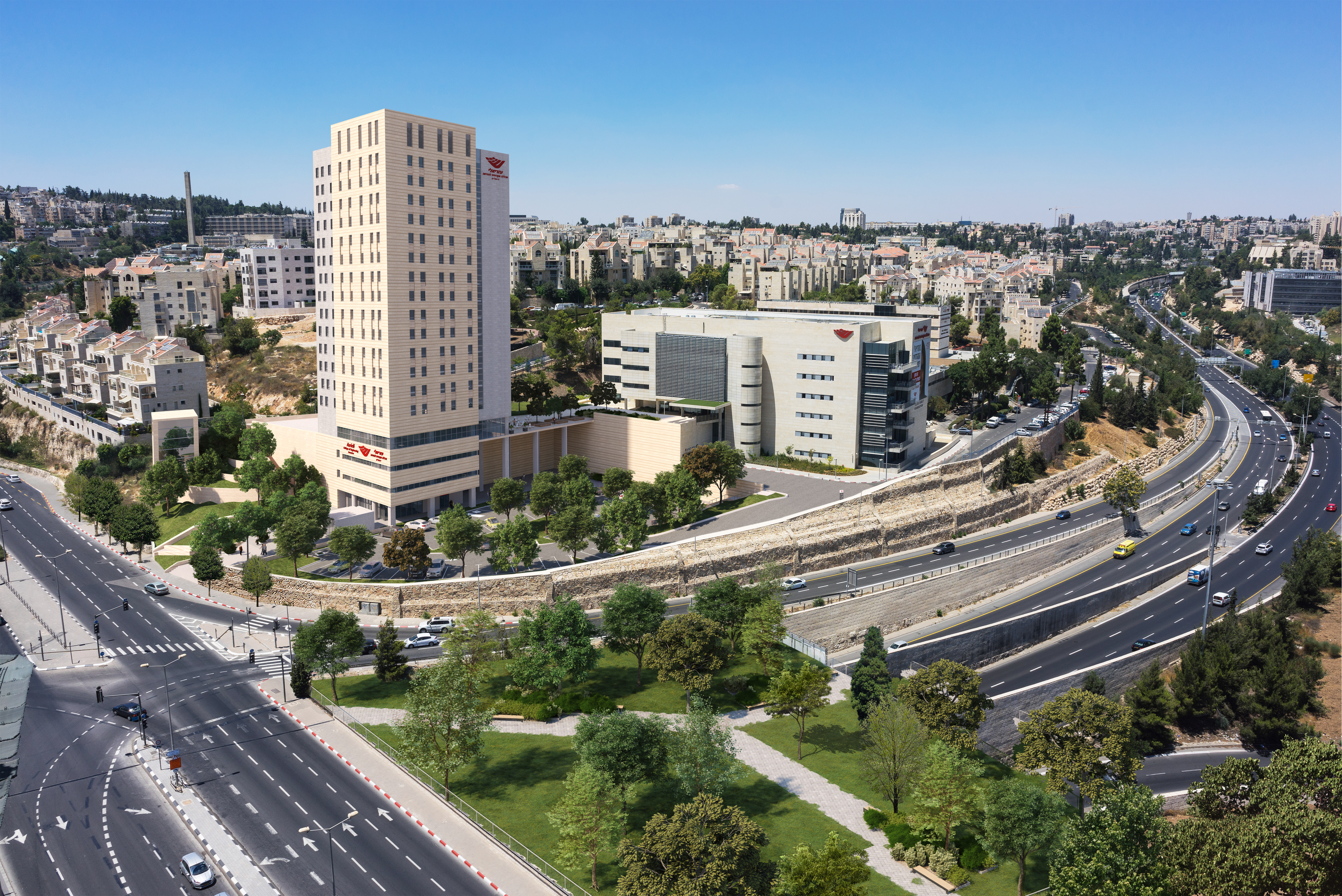
- Type: Public; Technical
- Established: December 25, 1996
- President: Professor Tamar Raz Nahum
- Vice-president: Attorney Amit Persico(and CEO)
- Location: Jerusalem, Israel
- Campus: Urban
- Website: jce-en.mipo.co.il

Azrieli College of Engineering Jerusalem (Hebrew: עזריאלי-המכללה להנדסה ירושלים) is an Israeli public academic college that trains engineers. It is located in the Ramat Beit HaKerem neighborhood of Jerusalem, between Jerusalem's two major high-tech industrial areas, Har Hotzvim and the Jerusalem Technology Park.

== Overview ==
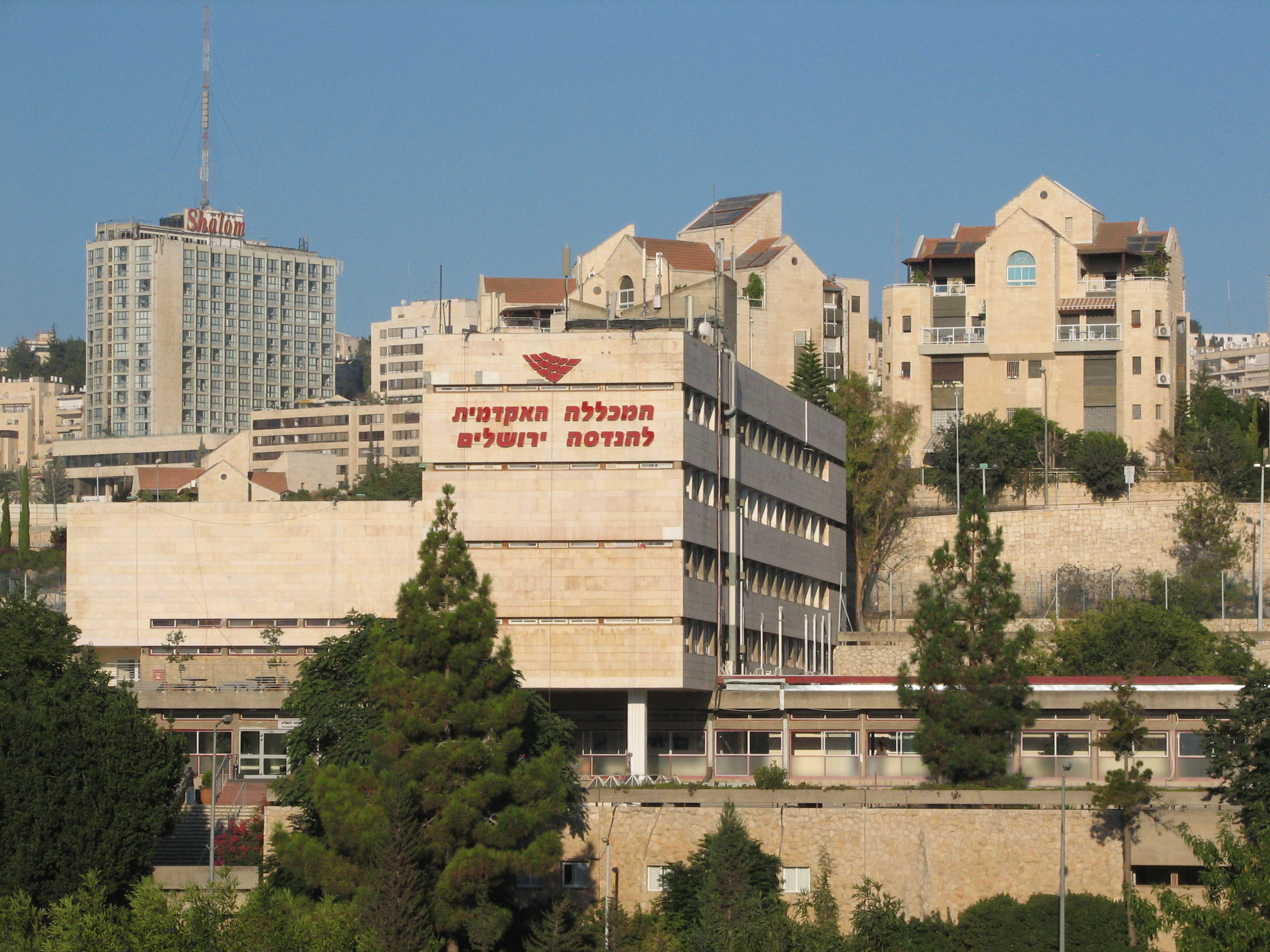
Azrieli College of Engineering Jerusalem

High-tech enterprises in Jerusalem have been warning of a severe shortage of technological manpower. To fill that gap, Azrieli College of Engineering Jerusalem coordinates its academic programs with the local high-tech industry. The college offers undergraduate (Bachelor of Science, B.Sc.) degrees in software engineering, industrial management engineering, electronic engineering, advanced materials engineers, Pharmaceutical engineering (cooperation with TEVA), mechanical engineering, as well as a graduate (Master of Science, M.Sc.) in software engineering and a pre-academic preparatory program to prepare prospective students for acceptance into and success in the college's engineering departments.

== History ==
The college was established on the foundations of the professional 'Bezeq College' (opened in 1951). After Bezeq's decision to shut down its vocational training in the 1990s, Ehud Olmert, then Mayor of Jerusalem, joined forces with Minister of Education Zevulun Hammer, and Professor Amnon Pazi, then chairman of the budgeting and planning committee of the council for higher education, to open a new vocational college in Jerusalem.

Plans to establish the college were announced on December 25, 1996, and approved in 1998.

In 2013 the college was renamed the Azrieli College of Engineering Jerusalem, following a large endowment by David Azrieli.

In 2017 the college moved into its current location, an 18-story building designed and built for this purpose.

Delegates of the Jerusalem Municipality sit on the Board of Governors and the executive board.

== Joint programs ==
The college is authorized as the exclusive Jerusalem partner of Technion – Israel Institute of Technology enjoying a partnership in a Civil and Environmental Engineering Track, wherein students study the first two years of the program in Jerusalem, and the second two years at Technion in Haifa.

== See also ==
- Education in Israel
- List of universities and colleges in Israel
- Science and technology in Israel
- Practical engineer
