= Aluma =

Aluma may refer to:

- Aluma, Israel, a communal settlement
- Aluma – Youth for Change, an Israeli nonprofit organization
- Aluma (street paper), a Swedish street newspaper
- Aluma (restaurant), a restaurant in the Crowne Plaza Hotel in Jerusalem
- Keve Aluma (born 1998), American college basketball player
- Peter Aluma (born 1973), Nigerian basketball player
- Lake Aluma, Oklahoma, US, a town
