= IAF Technological College, Beersheba =

Coordinates: 31°13′44.75″N 34°46′58.51″E

- המכללה הטכנולוגית של חיל האוויר והחלל שלוחת באר שבע
- Type: Military college
- Established: 1976
- Address: ד.צ. 03534 צה"ל, באר שבע, Beersheba, Israel

IAF Technological College, Beersheba (Hebrew: המכללה הטכנולוגית של חיל האוויר והחלל שלוחת באר שבע), also known as the Techni School, is a technology-oriented high school and college in Beersheba, Israel.

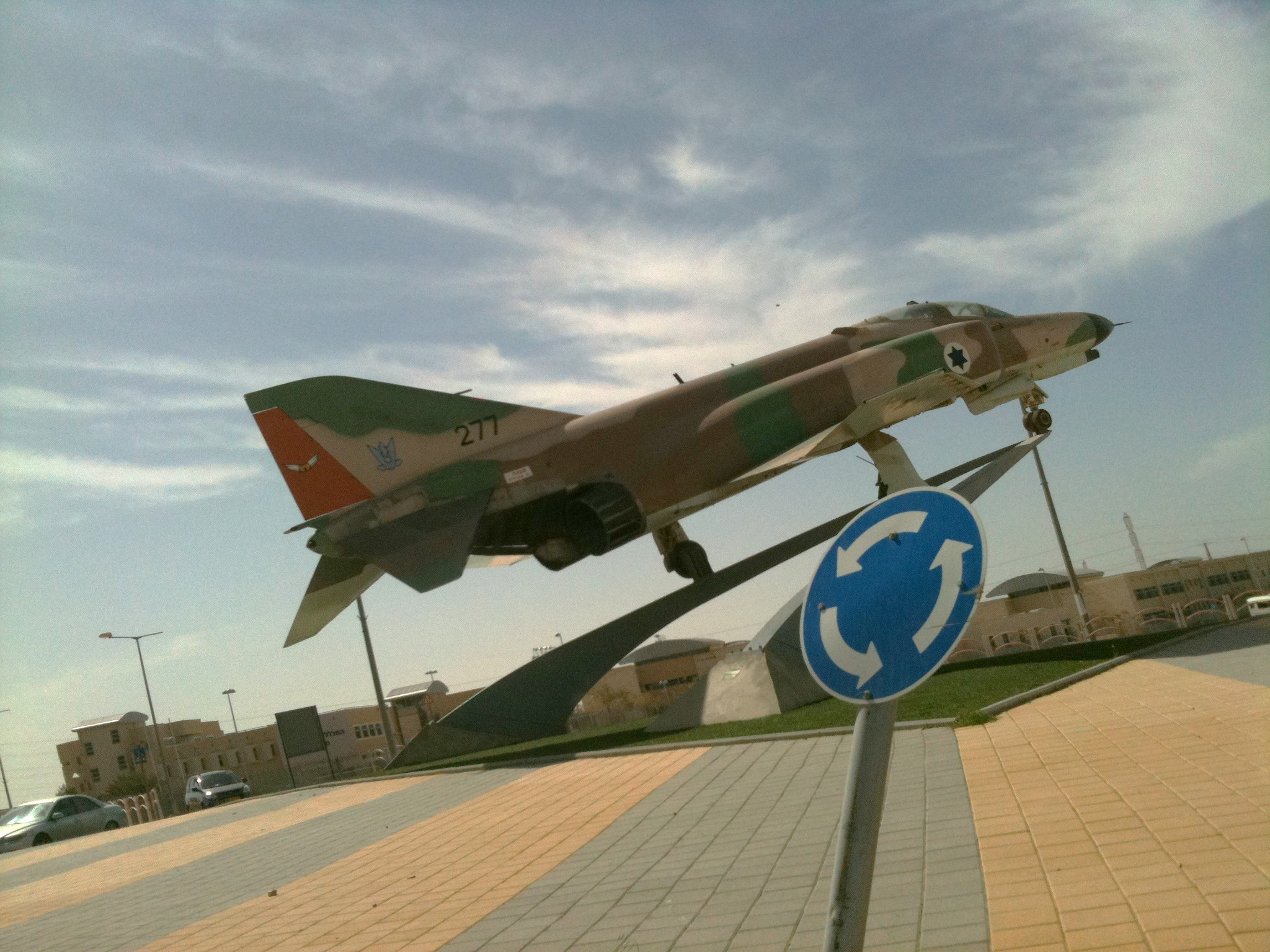
F-4E Kurnass Phantom II on the school grounds

== History ==
IAF Technological College is located in the Nahal Ashen neighborhood in Beersheba (the original campus was in Naot-Lon Beersheba).

The school trains Israel Air Force cadets (Hebrew: שוחר, Shoher) from the 9th or 10th grade through graduation from the 12th grade. Those who excel academically continue to the technological class (grade 13) and are eligible to receive a practical engineering certificate following 14th grade. Students with high grades have the option to continue their studies for a B.Sc. At first, the Technological school offered only a single class in a home-style trailer building surrounded by a gate. Since then, many trailer classes have been added, as well as a kitchen, of which half serves as a classroom. The building contains many computer laboratories, a gymnasium, two basketball courts, two football fields, a theater and a swimming pool.

The cadets are required to wear Israeli Air force uniforms with a special shoulder and beret insignia.

When a student has finished their studies they are entitled to wear the Cadet's wings. As of 2006 the sign has been changed as it had wings and the students are not in combat units (the meaning of wings on insignia).

75% of the students are successful on their first attempt of the bagrut exams, with an average of 30 bagrut point. 97% success rate for 13'th class and 100% for 14'th class

The college offers 4 programs that provide practical engineering education: flight electronics, flight mechanics, Pami Atimdim and electricity.

== See also ==
- Education in Israel
