= Nona Orbach =

Nona Orbach (Hebrew: נונה אורבך; born 1953) is an Israeli multidisciplinary artist, art therapist and teacher.

== Biography ==
Nona Orbach was born and raised in Ness Ziona. Her family immigrated to Ness Ziona from Russia in 1883. Her father, Prof. Abraham Patchornik, was a senior organic chemist at the Weizmann Institute of Science. Orbach earned a BA in arts from Oranim Academic College in 1984, and an MA in art therapy from Lesley College, Boston, in 1988. She lives and works in Kiryat Tiv'on.

== Art career ==
From 1984 to 1988, Orbach founded and ran a community art center that still operates today. From 2009 to 2015, she held a teaching post at Oranim College. Orbach authored The Spirit of Matter (Orbach & Galkin, 1997), a handbook for therapists, artists, and educators, that details a hundred art exercises as part of a six-stage journey. Each exercise is thoroughly examined from technical, social and emotional aspects. An English translation of the book was published electronically in 2016. In discussing her work as a conceptual artist, Orbach compares herself to an archaeologist. In the late 1990s she created a conceptual "archaeological" website called Tel-Nona ("Nona mound", the Hebrew name echoing an archeological mound). According to Orbach, the site is where she mentally and spiritually digs for discoveries: she is simultaneously the mound being dug, the digger, the methods, and the findings. Orbach invented a character called Mound Hacker, who leaves ostraca at archeological sites and maps them on Google Earth. Each ostracon on Google Earth links to her blog, which is dedicated primarily to the loss of the Great Library of Alexandria. Using various metaphorical devices, the blog offers a commentary on how humanity develops massive bodies of knowledge and easily loses them. In 2012, Orbach started a blog titled Blog as Artwork. In 2013, she was a keynote speaker at the Permissions and Inspirations, University of Haifa.

In 1991, Orbach presented a joint exhibition with artist Gaia Tchetchik at the Arsuf gallery in Rishpon, titled "Communicating Vessels" and consisting of about thirty works. For the exhibition's conceptual and physical format, Orbach chose bowls, an object that carries both personal and cultural iconographies. Rather than clay, the bowl sculptures were made of curved two-dimensional paper.

Orbach and Tchetchik's 1992 exhibition "Chariot Sculptures", at the Herzliya Museum of Contemporary Art, featured about forty Roman chariot sculptures, variously elaborated. The following year, Orbach and Tchetchik presented about twenty of these at the Grand Palais in Paris. The sculptures dealt with the complex relationships between the image of a winged female charioteer, made of paper in a variety of techniques, and her chariot, made of iron.

In her 1998 exhibition "Restless Torso" at the New Art Gallery in Kiryat Tivon, Orbach presented two collections : paper drawings from the series '1000 Drawings', and plaster reliefs of fossils from the series 'Fossils'. Using pencils, oil pastels, and collage, Orbach juxtaposed different forms of drawing, such as prehistoric cave paintings covered with archaeological layers. The fossils were made of plaster and pigments embedded with scraps of metal, wood, and bone. Some were placed in wooden boxes, supposedly for safekeeping, as if rare specimens in a natural history museum; while others were placed in glass cases set on the gallery walls.

For the 2001 exhibition "Tel Nona" at the Israeli National Maritime Museum in Haifa, Orbach created a faux archaeological site, based on items she had collected over the years. These formed the artist's interpretation of archaeological statuettes from the Chalcolithic and Canaanite cultures. With minimal modification, everyday off-the-shelf items were turned into "ancient" archaeological artifacts. Part of the exhibition, "Large Remains", included monumental floor-standing wall sculptures made of plaster and pigments, installed on wire mesh and iron frames. A further slide installations called "Pit of Memory and Oblivion" featured photographs of holes dug on the beach, projected as light circles from the ceiling onto the floor, in a wide, dark space.

Orbach's 2004 exhibition "Hedge", at the Tova Osman Gallery in Tel Aviv, formed a sequel to "Tel Nona". This exhibition had three parts. One consisted of paper drawings from the "1000 Drawings" series: using pencils and oil chalks on little square pieces of paper, Orbach had sketched a collection of images : a leaf, a table, a fish, a cypress tree, a wheel – all simulating human torsos. The second part featured narrow wooden strips hanging on a hedge. The third part was an element borrowed from the "Tel Nona" (2001) 'Large Remains' series a sarcophagus-shaped boat, made of a plastered iron-and-netting framework, resting on a window.

Orbach's 2005 video project "Incessant Mezuzah", documented the scroll writing, case writing, and other processes of a Jewish mezuzah.

"Tel Nona, Audience Version" (2013), Israel Museum, Jerusalem. Rivka Bakalash: "The title of Nona Orbach's "happening" is derived from an artistic dialogue with the notion of "Readymade" coined by Marcel Duchamp. Orbach challenges the distinction between reality and fiction, archaic and contemporary, a museum exhibit and a found object, "high art" and "low art," in keeping with Duchamp's ideas. From the ashes Orbach creates the substances of life. Like the phoenix that rises from the ashes. She affixes wings to the potsherd, returning it to the here-and-now. By inviting the audience to revive the virtual and metaphorical "Ancient Library of Alexandria" in her website, she synthesizes, via a near-alchemical formula, the personal-perishable with the eternal human tissue. Nona moves from the personal mound, Tel Nona, to the collective Tel (mound)—the archaeological finds, and back to personal objects which carry memory and meaning."

== Selected solo exhibitions ==
- 1991, "Connected Vessels", Arsuf Gallery, Rishpon (Catalog).
- 1992, "Chariot Sculptures", Herzliya Museum of Contemporary Art (Catalog).
- 1998, "1000 Drawings", Art Gallery, Western Galilee College.
- 1998, "Restless Torso", New Art Gallery, Kiryat Tivon (Catalog).
- 2000, "Daftar", Beit Midrash Elul, Jerusalem.
- 2001, "Tel Nona", The National Maritime Museum, Haifa (Catalog).
- 2002, "Large Remains", Bet Gabriel.
- 2003, "Pocket Dictionary", Carmeil (Catalog).
- 2004, "Hedge", Tova Osman Gallery, Tel Aviv.
- 2007, "War Diary", Artists House, Tel Aviv.
- 2009, "Went, Sailed, and Came", Wilfred Israel Museum (Catalog).
- 2009, "Second Excavation Season", Kay Academy, Beersheba.
- 2011, "Mending Tools", Museum of Art, Ein Harod
- 2013, Israel Museum, Jerusalem, Tel Nona, Audience Version, performance installation, and Mound Hacker, a key to ancient Alexandria library.

== Selected group exhibitions ==
- 2017, "En-counter 4", Gallery space Kagiya, Kyoto.
- 2014, Kyoto Municipal Museum of Art Annex, including an honor prize.
- 2014, "Visual Scripts" – Wilfrid Israel Museum, Israel.
- 2013, "I am from here", Kiryat Tivon.
- 2009, Artists House, Tel Aviv.
- 2008, "Incessant Mezuzah", NCA, Tokyo (Catalog).
- 2008, "In Sight", Mirai Gallery, Tokyo (Catalog).
- 2008, "Landscape: Four fences and yearning", Artist Studio, Yavne.
- 2008, "Glances at a portrait", Danon Gallery, Tel Aviv.
- 2007, "Drawing Biennale" – Jerusalem Artists House (Catalog).
- 2007, "Incessant Mezuzah" video work – Jewish Museum, New York.
- 2005, "1000 Drawings" – The Jerusalem Artists House (Catalog).
- 2004, 'The Wandering Library", Markers IV: Artist Book Event, Book Museum, Lodz.
- 2004, "Mezuzah" Time for Art, Gideon Ofrat, curator.
- 2003, "Wandering Library", Markers IV: Artist Book Event concurrent with the 2003 Venice Biennale, The Jewish Museum of Venice.
- 1993, "Contemporary Israeli Fiber Art", Central Museum of Textiles, Lodz, Poland (Catalog).
- 1993, "Contemporaines 93", Grand Palais, Paris (Catalog).
- 1993, "Objects of Desire", Bat-Yam Museum (Catalog).
- 1991, "Acquisitions 1991–1993", Haifa Museum of Art (Catalog).

== Permanent collections ==
- 2007, "Incessant Mezuzah" video artwork, Jewish Museum in New York.
- 2001, "Memory" diptych donated to the Haifa Museum.
- 1991, "Basin" acquired by Meir Aharonson for the Haifa Museum.

== See also ==
- Visual arts in Israel
