= Psychometry =

Psychometry may refer to:

- Psychometry (paranormal), a form of extrasensory perception
- Psychometrics, a discipline of psychology and education
- Psychometric Entrance Test, a standardized academic test used in Israel

== See also ==
- Psychrometrics, the measurement of the heat and water vapor properties of air
- Psychophysics, the relationship between physical stimuli and the sensation they produce
