= Streams Method in Israeli education =

Historical education system in pre-State Israel

The Streams Method in Israeli education refers to the ideological and party-based division of the Jewish educational system in pre-state and early State of Israel periods. This system emerged in the 1920s under the British Mandate and continued until the passage of the State Education Law in 1953, which established a national educational framework. The principal streams were the Labor, General, and Mizrachi (Religious Zionist) streams. Following the establishment of the state, an additional Agudat Israel stream emerged to serve the ultra-Orthodox community. Certain institutions, such as Talmud Torah schools and Kol Israel Chaverim, maintained a non-partisan stance.

== History ==
During the British Mandate period, party-based education systems were introduced to promote specific ideological values alongside general education subjects. These values included Zionism, socialism, and religious identity. At that time, the absence of a centralized educational authority enabled political parties to operate their own school systems.

Several organizations, including Hapoel, Beitar, Haganah, Irgun, and Lehi, supported the dissemination of these ideological educational frameworks through extracurricular activities and youth movements.

== Streams ==
Each educational stream developed distinct teacher training programs and curricular frameworks, reflecting its ideological foundations.

=== General Stream ===
By 1948, the General Stream educated approximately 50.2 percent of Jewish students. This stream was aligned with General Zionist ideology and aimed to provide a national-traditional education accessible to all ethnic and religious groups. Its curriculum emphasized scientific progress and promoted inclusivity and national unity.

=== Labor Stream ===
Established in 1923, the Labor Stream served about 27.8 percent of Jewish students by 1948. Affiliated with the General Federation of Labor, it emphasized Zionist-socialist values. The stream focused on cultivating independent, pioneering citizens through educational and communal institutions such as kibbutzim.

=== Mizrachi Stream ===
Founded by the Mizrachi movement, the Mizrachi Stream combined Orthodox religious education with Zionism and elements of modernism. It educated around 22.5 percent of Jewish students by 1948 and was supported by parties including Hapoel HaMizrachi. Over time, its influence declined due to secularization trends and efforts toward standardized education reforms.

=== Agudat Israel Stream ===
Recognized officially in 1948, the Agudat Israel Stream served the non-Zionist ultra-Orthodox population. Under the Status Quo agreement, this stream was granted considerable autonomy with minimal state curricular oversight. Led by figures such as Rabbi Yitzchak Meir Levin, it played a key role in integrating religious education into the national system.

== Abolition of the Streams and the Introduction of State Education ==
Following the establishment of the State of Israel, the 1949 compulsory education law mandated school attendance for all children aged five to thirteen. However, disagreements regarding the balance between secular and religious content delayed consensus on a unified education system. Secular parties such as Mapai advocated for a common framework, while religious groups opposed what they perceived as encroachments on religious autonomy.

These tensions contributed to the resignation of David Ben-Gurion and the collapse of his second government.

The State Education Law passed on 12 August 1953 unified the General and Labor streams, institutionalized the Mizrachi stream as the official state religious stream, and preserved limited autonomy for the Agudat Israel stream.

== Legacy ==
Although the formal stream system was abolished, ideological divisions continue to influence Israeli education. Variations in school affiliations, curricula, and state funding reflect the historical foundations established by the original streams.

== See also ==
- Education in Israel
- History of Israel
