= Maimon Cohen =

Maimon Cohen (Hebrew: מאימון כהן; born 1947) is a linguist of the Hebrew language. He is on the faculty of Kaye Academic College of Education in Beersheba, Israel.

== Education ==
In 1987, he completed his dissertation, which dealt with linguistic aspects of the Qere and Kethiv in the Masoretic Text of Scripture. His adviser was Simcha Kogut.

Cohen continued his work on the Qere and Kethiv in the 1990s and received the Nehemya Allony Prize in 1998.

== Works ==
In 2007, he published The Kethib and Qere in the Biblical Text: A Linguistic Analysis of the Various Traditions Based on the Manuscript 'Keter Aram Tsova' (Hebrew).

In this book, Cohen set out to answer the following questions:

- What are the historical roots of the Qere/Kethiv phenomenon?
- How can the inconsistencies in the phenomenon be reconciled? In one place, the Qere and Kethiv might be exactly the reverse of what they are in a different place.
- Is there a relationship between the Kethiv and Qere? That is, is one of them consistently an earlier work, and the other consistently a later one?

After four chapters, on orthography, morphology (and morpho-phonology), syntax (and morpho-syntax), and lexicon and style, Cohen presented this conclusion: the vast majority of occurrences of Qere and Kethiv in Scripture reflect different dialects of the ancient Hebrew language (whether earlier. later, or simultaneous). Only a few occurrences are related to the specific style of Scripture; most occurrences have nothing to do with Scripture per se, and instead relate to the Hebrew language as a whole. He writes in the preface that this book would be interesting to people who are concerned with the phenomenon of Qere/Kethiv, people who study Biblical orthography, to Hebrew linguists in general, and Biblical scholars.
