= Reidman College =

Private trade college in Israel

Coordinates: 32°6′20″N 34°48′3″E

Reidman International College for Complementary and Integrative Medicine, also known as Reidman College, is a private professional trade college founded in Tel Aviv, Israel in 1987 by Sally Reidman, a holistic practitioner from California that immigrated to Israel.

The college has five campuses throughout the width and breadth of Israel. The main Campus is in Tel Aviv, with branches in Jerusalem, Haifa, Kinneret, Beersheba, with studies available in Eilat through "Nihul Plus".

Reidman study programs implement both the integrative and complementary medicine philosophies.

Periodically Reidman College conducts symposiums a professional meeting in Chinese medicine, with the collaboration of Chinese universities. In this context guests are invited from Israel and abroad to give lectures and workshops.

The college consists of 5 different schools offering a variety of 3-4 year professional programs and courses. They are the: School of Traditional Chinese Medicine, School for Natural Medicine, School for Manual Therapies, School for Holistic Psychotherapy, School for Holistic Coaching, and a program in Sports Therapy for Children and Babies and a program training practitioners in the approach of Metaism with cooperation with ”Merchav Mudaut”. The training programs are also recognized by Colleges and Universities abroad and also by their respective professional organizations in Europe, United States and China. A big part of the educational programs at Reidman College are in professional collaboration with the "Maccabbi Tivi" HMO.

Along with the various multi- year programs are shorter programs and courses of semester and one-year duration. Besides profession trainings to become a therapist, there are also workshops and courses for the general public.

The Reidman College teaching faculty are from Israel and around the world. The learning includes both theoretical and practical studies in the College clinics under supervision.

Reidman College has many different cooperations with Hospitals, HMO”S in Israel.

== Curricula ==
- Traditional Chinese Medicine (TCM)
- Tuina
- Shiatsu
- Naturopathy
- Natural Nutrition - Advisor for a healthy lifestyle
- Clinical Herbalist (Phyto-Therapy)
- Body-oriented psychotherapy
- Transpersonal psychotherapy
- Psycho-physical Healing
- Reflexology
- Integrative Massage Therapy
- Holistic Health Practitioner- HHP
- Holistic Coaching
- Holistic Therapeutic Sports for Babies and Children
- NLP - Neuro-linguistic Programming
- Metaism

== International relations ==
Reidman College is an international college, representing in Israel various universities and colleges of Complementary and Integrative medicine from around the world, such as:

- The Zhejiang Chinese Medical University, Hangzhou, China
- The Chengdu University of Traditional Chinese Medicine TCM, China
- EABP - European Association of Body-Psychotherapy
- AHG – The American Herbalist Guild
- EUROTAS - The European Transpersonal Association
- ABMP- Associated Bodywork & Massage Professionals

== Use of the Term Medicine ==
Graduates of Reidman are not entitled to a license or certificate from the Israeli Health Ministry. In response to an investigative inquiries by Haaretz journalists, Health Ministry officials issued a warning to Reidman demanding that the college make it clear to graduates that they do not have a legal certificate and must exercise caution not to deceive the public by using professional medical terminology.

== See also ==
- Education in Israel
- Health care in Israel
