= Kaye Academic College of Education =

Coordinates: 31°16′15″N 34°46′51″E

Central Building

Kaye Academic College of Education (Hebrew: המכללה האקדמית לחינוך ע"ש קיי), a teacher training college located in Beersheba, Israel. The college was named for Geoffrey Kaye, its chief sponsor. In addition to improving the status of teachers in Israel, the college contributes to educational activities in the Southern region and conducts many projects in the Jewish and Bedouin sectors in conjunction with the Ministry of Education, Beersheva municipality, Ben-Gurion University, regional councils, JOINT and the "SAKTA-RASHI" Foundation.

== History ==
Kaye Academic College of Education started off as a college for new immigrant teachers in two sheds in a neighborhood known as "Meshek Ezer" in Beersheva. It was founded in 1954 by Arie Simon, who was the school inspector for the Southern Region at the time. The aim was to provide a solution to the outrageous lack of teachers in the various types of settlements for new immigrants. The establishment of the college, in fact, laid the foundations of the education system in the Negev. In 1960, after moving from one temporary building to another, the first institute of education was permanently housed in the "Gimmel" neighborhood in Beer Sheva, and was named "the National College for Teachers and Kindergarten Teachers". The college expanded and developed rapidly, and from the beginning of the 70s, it began to train teachers – including new immigrant teachers and teachers in the Bedouin sector – for most teaching tracks. In 1982, the college moved to its present location, and its name was changed to Kaye Academic College of Education. At the same time, the National College for Sports Education, which had been founded in 1964 by the late Dr. Eli Freedman, was incorporated into Kaye College. In 1994, Kaye College was granted academic status, and was thereby entitled to confer a B.Ed. degree. In 2003, the Academic Council of the college, which had been approved by the Council for Higher Education, began to conduct its various activities. The Academic Council is currently preparing to offer M.Ed. training programs.

== Academic tracks ==

At present, there are more than 2,000 Jewish and Bedouin students studying in various tracks:

- Kindergarten teachers (for children ages 0–6)
- Teaching of the first grades (kindergarten and the first and second grades)
- Primary school (first to sixth grades)
- The track for middle school teachers, which offers specializations in Bible, Hebrew grammar and literature, Arabic, English, Mathematics, Computers, Natural Sciences and Informal Education.
- Special Education (for pupils ages 6–20)
- Physical Education (first to twelfth grades)
- Art (first to twelfth grades).

== Study programs ==
- For high-school graduates: A four-year program after which graduates are entitled to receive a Bachelor's degree on an academic level as well as a teaching certificate.
- For candidates who are required to meet high-level entry criteria: This program is designed to attract top-quality students who will become "research teachers" and who perceive innovativeness and initiative as challenges in education. The students are expected to maintain high academic standards throughout the three-year program, and they receive a full scholarship for the duration of their studies.
- For academics ("ACE", "Shachaf"): A special two-year program in teacher education for teachers with an academic education. This program views teachers as "meaning makers" that operate and are immersed in educational situations.
- For in-service teachers: Continuing studies for teachers who have a teaching certificate and who would like to expand their academic education in order to graduate with a B.Ed. in teaching.
- For counselors: Certification and Advanced Certification Courses are offered to counselors who wish to study toward a B.Ed. degree and a teaching certificate. Programs are formulated on an individual basis, based on the student's previous education.
- Pre-Academic Preparatory Program: This is an intensive program that provides an opportunity for participants to complete their matriculation requirements or improve their grades, as a basis for future academic studies. Each year, approximately 500 students study in this program.
- The Center for Teachers' Professional Development: Kaye College serves as a regional center and as such is dedicated to promoting the professional growth and personal development of educators in the Negev. The needs of the Ministry of Education and the teaching system as a whole, together with regional exigencies and the individual needs of each teacher, are taken into account. In-service professional development courses catering to the needs of subject teachers and homeroom teachers throughout their teaching careers are held every academic year.
- The Program for School Principals: Kaye College also conducts a training program for school principals. This program provides the knowledge, skills, values and perspectives required of people who are about to assume leadership and managerial positions in educational institutions.
- Librarianship and information management studies: The courses are held at Kaye College, under the auspices of Beit Berl College. Participants in the program receive a "Certified Librarian" diploma and/or a "Management Studies" diploma.
- Training courses for sport teachers and sport instructors: Kaye College trains and provides certification for sport instructors in seven of branches of sport: football, basketball, volleyball, handball, track events, gymnastics and swimming. Parallel courses in sport and health club- administration and aerobic dance instruction, are also offered.
- Training courses for art counselors.
- The Center for Parenting and Family - the center deals with the training of moderators for various local groups that deal with parenting and family.

== Projects ==
- P.A.C.T.: This is an educational intervention program whose aim is to promote language competency and Mathematics amongst kindergartens children of Ethiopian origin in Beer Sheva.
- P.A.C.T+: This is an educational intervention program whose aim is to promote language competency and Mathematics amongst school children of Ethiopian origin.
- Readiness for the first grade: This is an educational intervention program whose aim is to promote learning skills leading to success at school.

The Center for Educational Growth: This program is run in conjunction with Ben-Gurion University and Kaye College. Its purpose is to lead to changes in the education system.

- The Sports Center: The center has facilities including a treadmill, a fitness room, physiological laboratories and more.

Visual Arts: The Center for Art Studies in the Negev, also known as the "Visual Arts Center", is a cultural and art institute that is run by the Association for Projects under the auspices of Kaye College, in conjunction with the Beer Sheva Municipality.

- The "Visual Arts Center" was founded in 1976, with the aim of meeting a wide range of social and cultural needs in Beer Sheva and the Negev.

The center is housed in a new building on the college campus. Areas of study include painting, drawing, sculpture, ceramics, photography and lithography. Three tracks are offered in the "Visual Arts Center":

- Certified art counselor (two years)
- Senior art counselor (three years)
- Creative workshops in the morning and the evening for the general public.

== See also ==
- Education in Israel
- Maimon Cohen
