= Aluma – Youth for Change =

- אלומה – צעירים לשם שינוי
- Formation: 1983; 43 years ago
- Headquarters: Lod
- Leader: Tami Chalmiš-Eisenman
- Website: www.aluma.org.il

Aluma – Youth for Change (Hebrew: אלומה – צעירים לשם שינוי) is an Israeli nonprofit organization established in 1983 to promote social mobility among young people in Israel. Its work focuses on four key decision-making crossroads in the lives of young people: meaningful military or national service, access to higher education, persistence and success in academic studies, and integration into sustainable employment.

The organization operates nationwide, accompanying more than 60,000 young people annually from over 120 towns and 20 academic institutions. Its target audiences include youth from Israel’s social and geographic periphery, the Arab community, the ultra-Orthodox community, Ethiopian Israelis, young people with disabilities, and youth at risk.

The CEO of Aluma is Tami Chalmiš-Eisenman, and the chairperson is Mevaseret Nevo.

== History ==
Aluma was founded in 1983 by members of the Torah and Avodah Study Center within the religious kibbutz movement. Initially, its activities were aimed at strengthening Jewish and civic identity among religious youth. In the 1990s, against the backdrop of immigration waves from Ethiopia and the former Soviet Union, the organization began initiatives to promote the integration of immigrant youth into Israeli society.

In 2000, the organization changed its name to Aluma – Social Involvement and Jewish Identity, focusing on preparation for military or national service. In 2022, it was renamed Aluma – Youth for Change to reflect its expansion into higher education and employment, emphasizing social mobility. In 2023, Aluma presented a report marking 40 years of activity to the President of Israel.

In March 2025, the organization announced a strategic merger with Dualis, a nonprofit specializing in integrating at-risk youth into sustainable employment. Under this partnership, Dualis operates within Aluma as the central branch for employment-related programs. This collaboration launched the "Compass for Success" project, aimed at providing employment integration for young people displaced from their homes or living in communities in northern Israel affected by the war. The program, implemented jointly with the Ministry of Welfare, is expected to assist about 150 young adults (ages 18–30) in entering the northern regional job market.

== Activity ==
Aluma works according to a continuum model of guidance, support, and information access in four areas:

Aluma for Meaningful Service, Aluma for Education, Aluma in the Academia, and Aluma for Employment.

=== Aluma for Meaningful Service ===
Given that military or national service is a central transition in the lives of young Israelis and an important step toward adult identity and social integration, Aluma provides individual and group guidance, information access, and empowerment for a service track suited to each participant. The organization operates three main programs:

- M'shartot B'emuna (Serving with Faith): Established in 2002, this flagship program supports religious girls preparing for military service. It offers personal, group, and educational guidance in high schools, communities, and through counseling hotlines. In 2025, the program operated in more than 85 schools, supporting 5,850 girls. The counseling hotline received over 6,000 inquiries in 2024-2025, reflecting a dramatic increase due to the Iron Swords War. While Aluma states that it does not encourage enlistment but only supports those who choose it, the program has become a key actor in shaping public discourse on religious women’s serviceת receiving both rabbinic criticism and praise from senior IDF officials.
- Tzahala: Founded in 1992 by Brig. Gen. Ran Peker, this long-term mentoring program supports at-risk youth by strengthening self-worth and encouraging meaningful service. Groups meet weekly with volunteer mentors of military or educational backgrounds over a three-year process. In 2025, responsibility for the program was transferred to the nonprofit "Erech L'derech"
- LeKratech (Towards You): An educational program for 11th–12th grade girls, mainly from at-risk backgrounds, providing emotional, educational, and practical preparation for service. A highlight is its annual national fair, introducing participants to military, national service, and pre-army programs.

=== Aluma for Education ===
To address barriers faced by peripheral youth in accessing higher education, Aluma develops counseling infrastructures in collaboration with the Council for Higher Education and other bodies. It operates national programs such as:

- Hesegim (Achievements): For first-generation students from the periphery.
- Ruad (Arabic: روّاد, “Pioneers”): For Arab, Bedouin, Druze, and Circassian communities.
- Zrkor and Tena: For ultra-Orthodox graduates, including preparatory courses, mentoring, and employment linkage.

=== Aluma in Academia ===
Aluma operates student support programs focusing on persistence, mentoring, and bridging between students and employers. Initiatives include:

- Achievements for Hi-Tech: Preparing peripheral youth for STEM degrees through scholarships, academic mentoring, and career training.
- Tena Scholarship Program: A government-funded scheme for ultra-Orthodox students, providing tuition grants and guidance.
- Marag, Yesodot, and Shaked: Programs supporting ex-ultra-Orthodox students in academic and social integration.

=== Aluma for Employment ===
- Academia Meets Experience (AME): A national internship program bridging academic study and job market demands, implemented in over 21 higher education institutions since 2019, with more than 15,000 students participating in 2,000 organizations.
- The Next Step: Launched in 2012 with the Edmond de Rothschild Foundation, promoting first employment for graduates, later expanded under the Council for Higher Education.
- Bridge to Employment: Provides modular support, resume workshops, interview preparation, and industry exposure tours.

A 2020 study by the Israel Democracy Institute found that 15% of students continued working at their internship placements, and graduates earned on average ₪5,000–20,000 more annually than peers without internship experience.

== Partners and collaborations ==
Among its funding partners are the Edmond de Rothschild Foundation, the Schusterman Family Foundation, the SAMIS Foundation, and the Bader Philanthropies. Some of Aluma’s employment-oriented programs for diverse and at-risk populations have been developed in collaboration with these foundations.
