= Dan Academic Center =

Israeli higher education institute

Coordinates: 32.08876°N 34.856641°E

- מרכז אקדמי דן
- Motto: האקדמיה של החברות
- Motto in English: The Industry's Academy
- Type: Private
- Active: 2011–2013
- President: Prof. Niv Ahituv
- Vice-president: Dr. Micha Hanani
- Location: Petah Tikva, Israel
- Campus: Urban
- Colors: Black, Blue and White
- Website: www.dan.ac.il (in Hebrew)

Dan Academic Center (Hebrew: מרכז אקדמי דן Merkaz Akademi Dan) was an Israeli higher education institute that specializes in the high tech and IT industry fields. It was established in 2011 within a technological industrial area in the city of Petah Tikva in the Tel Aviv Metropolitan Area. It closed down in 2013, and its activity was merged with the Center for Academic Studies (Or Yehuda), which closed down in 2019.

== History ==
Dan Academic Center was founded in 2011 by top academics, chief executives and entrepreneurs from the high tech and IT industries in Israel as an unprecedented initiative to create a unique academic college that specializes in the high tech and IT fields and to bring together academic education with front-line practical knowledge . The close relations and collaborations between the center and joint companies in the industry provide the motto for the center "the industry's academy".

During the years prior to the establishment of the center statistics have shown a decline in the number of graduates from the computer science and management information systems disciplines in higher education institutes in Israel, which implied a growing demand for academically educated manpower in the high tech and IT industries. At the same time it is noted that a significant amount of high tech employees in Israel who do not hold a relevant professional qualification encounter a glass ceiling on their way up to more senior positions. Dan Academic Center was created with the purpose of generating a workforce that maintains both a relevant academic qualification and cutting edge practical knowledge that would meet the needs of the industry. The center has defined its mission statement as to provide the next generation of professionals in the high tech industry in Israel.

== Academia-Industry collaboration ==
=== Networking ===
The students in Dan Academic Center combine work and study. They work in high tech organizations, companies and IT units. The center provides experienced employees with the opportunity to acquire an academic qualification and thereby to increase their chances to get promoted to senior positions in the organizations they already work in. For freshmen the center has created Dan Works, a business networking platform in order to refer them for employment in the joint companies. These companies hire the students for work so that in graduation they would have gained relevant practical experience. This helps the students through their study years to make a connection between theory and practice, to get to know professionals in their fields, and to increase their chances for employment in the high tech industry after graduation.

=== Advisory board ===
The center's academic activity and curricula are developed, among other criteria, according to the industry's needs so as to provide the students with both the theoretical and practical knowledge required. This scheme is directed by an advisory board that consists of executives and entrepreneurs from the joint companies, to include Matrix, John Bryce Training, Cisco, Comverse, Intel, Oracle, Microsoft, Cellcom, Nokia Siemens Networks, Amdocs, Orbotech, 013 Netvision, BMC Software, HP, IBM and EMC.

Several committees in the advisory board are responsible to advance certain subject areas in the center to include academic research according to industry's needs, integration of industry-related contents into academic curricula, local high school academy partnership, career development and social involvement.

=== Special Events ===
The center holds special events to include lectures and conferences. The coffee, technology and academy lectures are intended for registered and prospective students and are given by executives and top professionals from the joint companies. Through these lectures the students are informed about current and future trends in the high tech industry, and prospective students get the chance to learn more about the center and its collaboration with the industry. The joint companies may organize conferences in the center on various topics.

== Departments ==
Dan Academic center is accredited by the Council for Higher Education in Israel to teach for the following degrees.

- Bachelor of Science in Computer Science
- Bachelor of Arts in Management Information Systems
- Bachelor of Arts in Business Administration

During their study years the students are offered to work and manage projects in the joint companies, to take elective courses by which to focus on subjects they want to intern in and to take courses from other departments. The students can also collaborate with one another on a project. In their third year of study they are required to conduct a practicum in one of the joint companies, for which they are instructed both by the center and the relevant company.
