= Scientific Leadership =

Scientific Leadership is an educational program in Israel which is sponsored by Rashi foundation and Beit Yaziv center. The program combines scientific study with leadership development, creating a solid foundation for studying science, physics and astronomy, as well as personal and social empowerment.

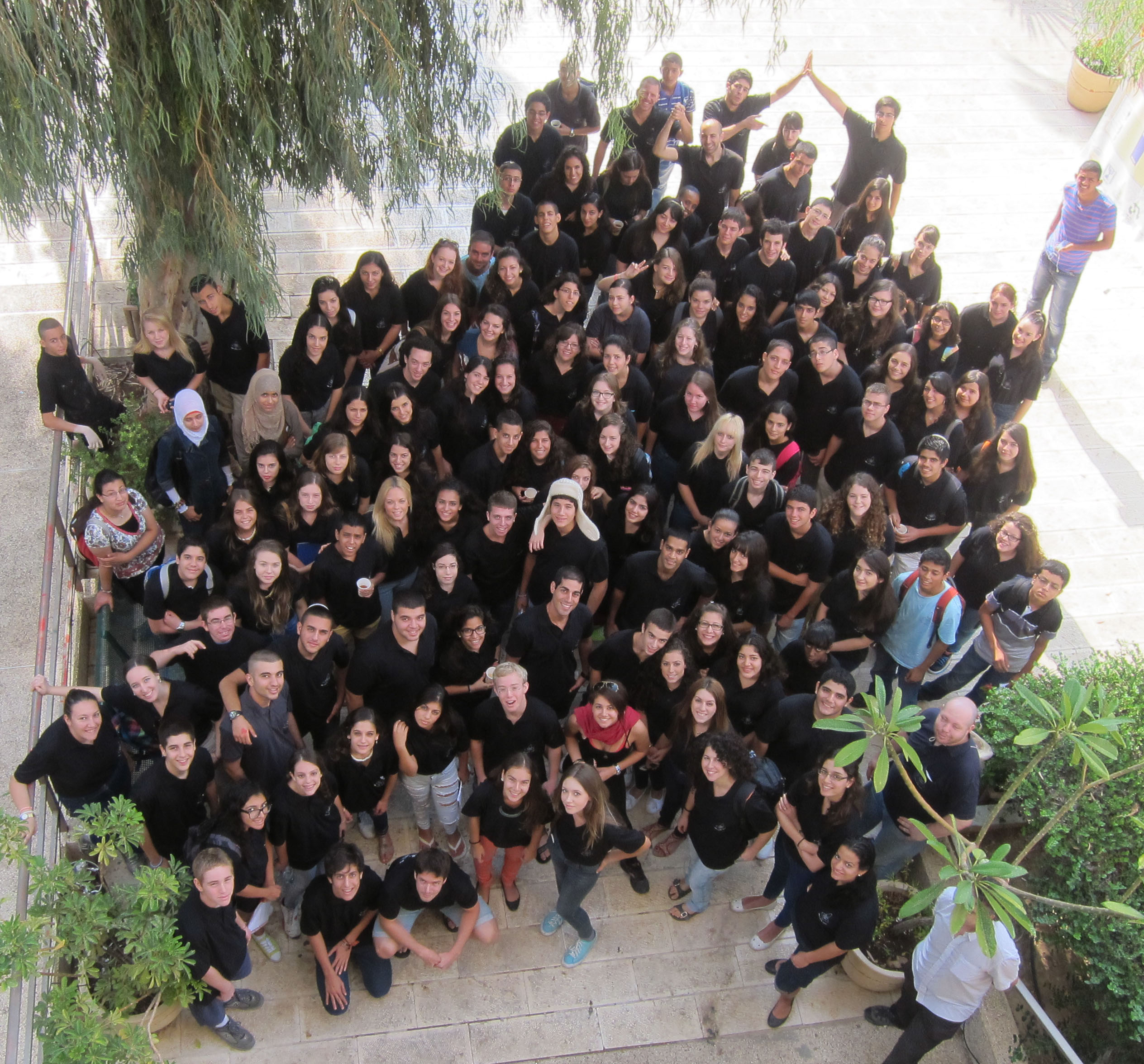
The Leaders of Scientific Leadership Program

== Background ==
High school students (10th-12th grades) with learning ability and high motivation, guide elementary school students on various scientific subjects combining experiential and social activity. The program exists in Beersheba, Ashdod, Kiryat Malakhi, Kiryat Gat, Arad, Dimona, Ofakim, Netivot, Merhavim, Eshel HaNasi, Segev Shalom and Yeruham. The activity is conducted with an emphasis on experiential learning and scientific experience. Games, experiments and models the students build on their own, are part of the experiential learning process we encourage. For example: by building and launching a hot air balloon we learn about weight, density and pressure. Selected students, graduates of the 9th grade, will be summoned to a leadership training camp during the summer vacation. The training process continues in another camp combined with operating a science festival. During the school year, the young leaders from all the communities where the program is running are convened once every few weeks to continue their training and learn from one another about what is happening in the various settlements. Those who are selected to guide additional years, undergo advanced training on leadership and science and are more responsible for the operation of current activities in the communities.

After finishing high school, the leaders can choose one of the following possibilities: studies as a part of academic reserve program, service year along with military service, national service and pre-military preparation course. Graduates who have committed military service / national service can get academic scholarships. Students in the academy constitute a significant program. Thus, we see the closure of the circle and creating scientific leadership inside the community.

== The Science Festival ==
As part of their training, the program's youth participate in a science festival that takes place in Beit Yaziv and Karaso Park of Science. At various stations, young people give explanations about scientific phenomena in physics, chemistry, biology, and astronomy. The annual festival lasts two days during the Sukkoth holiday.

== See also ==
- Israel Academy of Sciences and Humanities
- Science and technology in Israel
- United States – Israel Binational Science Foundation
- Weizmann Institute of Science
