= National Institute for Testing and Evaluation =

The National Institute for Testing and Evaluation (Hebrew: מרכז ארצי לבחינות ולהערכה; Abbreviation: NITE) is Israel's national higher education testing service. The Institute authors and proctors standardized entrance exams used by universities throughout Israel, including the Psychometric Entrance Test (PET) and English Level Placement Test (AMIRNET). The institute is a non-governmental organization; it was founded in 1983, and is still overseen by representatives of its six founding universities.

== Controversies ==
Despite being a non-profit, NITE was denied tax exemption after it was shown to have over ₪40 million in cash reserves.
