= Academic grading in India =

Academic grading in India depends on board/college and is based on either percentage system or a grade point system, GPA or CGPA.

== Overview ==
The national board Central Board of Secondary Education uses a percentage system coupled with a positional grade that indicates the student's performance with respect to their peers. The Indian Certificate of Secondary Education board instead utilizes only the mark obtained. State boards may give either or both marks and grades; if grades are given, most grade students linearly (e.g.: A+ for >90, A for 80–90 and B for 65-80) as per board format.

Many colleges outside India favour CBSE and ICSE; those colleges either outright disallow students from other boards (e.g.: University of Oxford) or require them to write additional examinations (e.g.: National University of Singapore).

Generally, at the school level, percentages below 65 are below average, percentages of 75-80 are considered average while a percentage above 95 is exceptional. At the university level however percentages between 60–79 are considered excellent and are difficult to obtain. The direct comparison of the percentage of marks obtained at one university with that at another is difficult. Indeed, the differential between universities in terms of marking scale can be as much as 20%, with some requiring an 85% plus for the award of Distinction, an approximate equivalent of the Latin honor summa-cum-laude, while yet others would award Distinction at above of 70%.

In some instances, a score close to 90% is very rare and is virtually impossible. Much of this can be reconciled in the backdrop of the minimum pass score. In a university with a 90% plus for Distinction, 60% may be the minimum passing mark. The university awarding distinction at 70% may have a passing mark of 45%. Thus the comparison of GPA (grade-point average) is quite difficult for Indian students elsewhere. A student having 95% will be close to 3.9 on the GPA scale, as would a student with a 75% from a 70% cut-off-for-distinction institution.

== Grade-point average (2011 alternate version) ==
In India, many universities and institutes rank their students in percentage of marks they get from the examinations and credits. Many universities have their ranking on point system. Though there are exceptions to standard system such as MBA Courses, the following table will summarize the grading system and conversions for normal graduation and post graduation in universities and institutes, unless otherwise declared by the institute.

- Some institutes with difficult curriculum and tough scoring give 70% scoring as Distinction
- Universities like the Jamia Millia University have different CPI system of evaluating B.Tech degree students. They have and give First Division at 60% Marks and Distinction / Honors at 75%.

== Grading ==
=== Higher Education ===
At the Indian Institutes of Technology, a 10-point grade-point average system is utilized, with letter grades being given for each course. A weighted average (weighted by the credit-volume of a course) of the grades is utilized for calculating each student's CGPA (Cumulative Grade Point Average)/CPI (Cumulative Performance Index). A high CGPA/CPI is usually very competitive to get at IITs and NITs, and an CGPA/CPI of 8.0 on a scale of 10 is considered very good.

=== CISCE ===
In ICSE and ISC examinations conducted by Council for Indian School Certificate Examinations (CISCE), a percentage system is used. The scores are given out of 100 for each of the subjects with a written exam. These scores are used for calculating the average. Additionally, letter grades are awarded for Socially Useful Productive Work (SUPW) course.

=== CBSE ===
The CBSE uses the following grading system since 2017 after CCE formulates

Letter Grade	Marks
A1	91-100
A2	81-90
B1	71-80
B2	61-70
C1	51-60
C2	41-50
D	33-40
E1	21-32
E2	0-20

The CBSE Used the CCE during 2009-17

CBSE 9-Point Grading Scale (2009–2017)
Grade	Marks Range (%)	Grade Point
A1	91–100	10
A2	81–90	9
B1	71–80	8
B2	61–70	7
C1	51–60	6
C2	41–50	5
D	33–40	4
E1	21–32	Fail
E2	00–20	Fail

The System used by CBSE before 2009 was :

Commonly used CBSE Letter Grade System (before 2009)
Grade	Marks Range (%)	Description
A+	90–100	Outstanding
A	80–89	Excellent
B	60–79	Very Good/Good
C	45–59	Average
D	33–44	Below Average
E	Below 33	Needs Improvement / Fail

== International grade conversion ==
International grade conversion for percentages scored in Indian universities.

Scale	U.S. Grade Equiv.
60–100	A
50–59	B
40–49	C
<40	F

*At selected institutions, a lower grade may be considered passing.
