= Lake Aluma, Oklahoma =

- Town
- Location in Oklahoma County and the state of Oklahoma.
- Coordinates: 35°32′00″N 97°26′54″W
- Country: United States
- State: Oklahoma
- County: Oklahoma

Area
  - Total: 0.28 sq mi (0.72 km^{2})
  - Land: 0.25 sq mi (0.66 km^{2})
  - Water: 0.019 sq mi (0.05 km^{2})
- Elevation: 1,102 ft (336 m)

Population (2020)
  - Total: 87
  - Density: 340.2/sq mi (131.36/km^{2})
- Time zone: UTC-6 (Central (CST))
  - Summer (DST): UTC-5 (CDT)
- FIPS code: 40-40800
- GNIS feature ID: 2412861

Lake Aluma is a town in Oklahoma County, Oklahoma, United States, and a part of the Oklahoma City Metropolitan Area. As of the 2020 census, Lake Aluma had a population of 87.

== Geography ==
According to the United States Census Bureau, the town has a total area of 0.3 square miles (0.78 km^{2}), of which 0.2 square miles (0.52 km^{2}) is land and 0.04 square miles (0.10 km^{2}) (7.41%) is water.

== Demographics ==
Historical population
Census	Pop.	Note	%±
1960	82		—
1970	124		51.2%
1980	101		−18.5%
1990	96		−5.0%
2000	97		1.0%
2010	88		−9.3%
2020	87		−1.1%
U.S. Decennial Census

=== 2020 census ===
As of the 2020 census, Lake Aluma had a population of 87. The median age was 55.5 years. 24.1% of residents were under the age of 18 and 34.5% of residents were 65 years of age or older. For every 100 females there were 89.1 males, and for every 100 females age 18 and over there were 94.1 males age 18 and over.

0.0% of residents lived in urban areas, while 100.0% lived in rural areas.

There were 37 households in Lake Aluma, of which 32.4% had children under the age of 18 living in them. Of all households, 73.0% were married-couple households, 2.7% were households with a male householder and no spouse or partner present, and 16.2% were households with a female householder and no spouse or partner present. About 8.1% of all households were made up of individuals and 0.0% had someone living alone who was 65 years of age or older.

There were 41 housing units, of which 9.8% were vacant. The homeowner vacancy rate was 2.9% and the rental vacancy rate was 20.0%.

Racial composition as of the 2020 census
Race	Number	Percent
White	72	82.8%
Black or African American	0	0.0%
American Indian and Alaska Native	2	2.3%
Asian	1	1.1%
Native Hawaiian and Other Pacific Islander	0	0.0%
Some other race	2	2.3%
Two or more races	10	11.5%
Hispanic or Latino (of any race)	6	6.9%

=== 2000 census ===
As of the census of 2000, there were 97 people, 40 households, and 33 families living in the town. The population density was 385.7 inhabitants per square mile (148.9/km^{2}). There were 41 housing units at an average density of 163.0 per square mile (62.9/km^{2}). The racial makeup of the town was 92.78% White, 3.09% Asian, and 4.12% from two or more races. Hispanic or Latino of any race were 1.03% of the population.

There were 40 households, out of which 27.5% had children under the age of 18 living with them, 82.5% were married couples living together, and 17.5% were non-families. 12.5% of all households were made up of individuals, and 7.5% had someone living alone who was 65 years of age or older. The average household size was 2.43 and the average family size was 2.67.

In the town, the population was spread out, with 19.6% under the age of 18, 2.1% from 18 to 24, 12.4% from 25 to 44, 47.4% from 45 to 64, and 18.6% who were 65 years of age or older. The median age was 52 years. For every 100 females, there were 106.4 males. For every 100 females age 18 and over, there were 100.0 males.

The median income for a household in the town was $152,674, and the median income for a family was $150,000. Males had a median income of $100,000 versus $31,250 for females. The per capita income for the town was $71,838. None of the population and none of the families were below the poverty line.

== Education ==
It is in Millwood Public Schools.
