= Practical engineer =

A practical engineer (Technical Engineer | P.Engineer)(Hebrew: הנדסאי) is a professional degree awarded by technological colleges in Israel and validated by the National Institute for Technological Training of the Ministry of Industry, Trade & Labor. It is a unique qualification that combines theoretical study with practical training. Similar education was adopted in Portugal in 1988 until 2005, technological college named Escolas Tecnológicas. It normally takes either 2 or 3 academic years to obtain a Practical Engineer's (P.Eng) degree, depending on the taught discipline.

== Professional regulation ==
While most of the decision-making process is performed by professional engineers and most of the practical work is done by technicians, practical engineers are taught to be able to do both things.

In Israel, practical engineers are an integral part of the hi-tech industry and form an important work-force.

Practical Engineers are licensed to lead and hold responsible for engineering projects according to their license (laws vary by country). For example, in Israel, construction practical engineers are permitted to design constructions of up to 11.5 meters high. For larger scale projects a higher engineering degree with specialization in construction is required.

== Education, training and skills ==
Practical engineers receive formal education that meets with criteria published by the National Institute for Technological Training. In sum around 2200 frontal academic hours are taught over a period of two to three years.

From an academic point of view, the main things differentiating engineers from practical engineers are the level and magnitude of foundation subjects, such as mathematics and physics.

Practical Engineers are taught foundations but only to the extent required by their profession, hence making their study shorter and more focused.

As part of the certification process, practical engineers are also required to undertake national certification tests, and to complete and defend a final project in their field of study or to participate in an internship program.

== Equivalent qualifications ==
There are some international qualifications equivalent to the Practical Engineer's degree. In Spain, the title of Ingeniero Técnico (Spanish for Technical Engineer) bears many similarities to its Israeli equivalent. Also, although not exactly the same, Practical Engineers are often thought of as Engineering technicians, Associate Engineers or Jr. Engineers in some English speaking countries. The French Brevet de Technicien Supérieur is similar.

Although not an academic degree in its traditional sense, practical engineers are normally awarded some academic credit when pursuing further study at a Bachelor's degree.
