= Education in Israel =

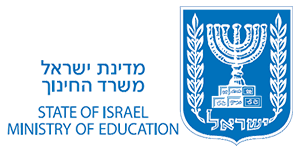

Education Ministry
- Education Minister of Israel: Yoav Kisch

National education budget (2015)
- Budget: 45.5 billion NIS

General details
- Primary languages: Hebrew & Arabic
- System type: State & Private

Literacy (2014)
- Total: 97.8%
- Male: 98.7%
- Female: 95.8%

Enrollment
- Total: 1,445,555
- Primary: 828,732
- Secondary: 259,139
- Post secondary: 357,685

Attainment
- Secondary diploma: 85%
- Post-secondary diploma: 49%

Education in Israel encompasses compulsory education, which spans from kindergarten through 12th grade, and higher education, which is characterized by a public university system and significant government subsidies. The school education, which corresponds to what is internationally termed primary and secondary education, consists of three tiers: primary education (grades 1–6), middle school (grades 7–9), and high school (grades 10–12).

The academic year begins on 1 September and ends on 30 June for elementary pupils and 20 June for middle and high school pupils. The Haredi yeshivas (religious schools of the ultra-Orthodox Jews) adhere to a separate schedule run by the Hebrew calendar, commencing on 1 Elul.

The Israeli school system includes various tracks such as state-secular, state-religious, independent religious, and Arab schools. There are also private schools, including democratic schools and international schools like the American International School in Israel. The system features also integrated schools that educate Jewish and Arab students together.

The Israeli education is lauded for its high academic standards, particularly in science and technology, and for its role in driving the nation's economic growth. The integration of Jewish and Arab students in some schools is seen as a progressive step towards coexistence. However, there are concerns about disparities in resource allocation between Jewish and Arab schools, and the low participation rate of Haredi students in mainstream education and the workforce. Efforts to integrate Haredi students into higher education and professional fields have seen mixed results. Additionally, recurring strikes by teachers and students over budget cuts and wages, represent ongoing challenges within the system.

== Schools: tiers and tracks ==
The education system in Israel consists of three tiers: primary education (grades 1–6, approximately ages 6–12), middle school (grades 7–9, approximately ages 12–15) and high school (grades 10–12, approximately ages 15–18). Compulsory education takes place from kindergarten through 12th grade. The school year begins on 1 September (2 September if 1 September is on Saturday), ending for elementary school pupils on 30 June (29 June if 30 June is on Saturday), and for middle school and high school pupils on 20 June (19 June if 20 June is on Saturday). Haredi yeshivas follow an independent schedule, starting on 1 Elul.

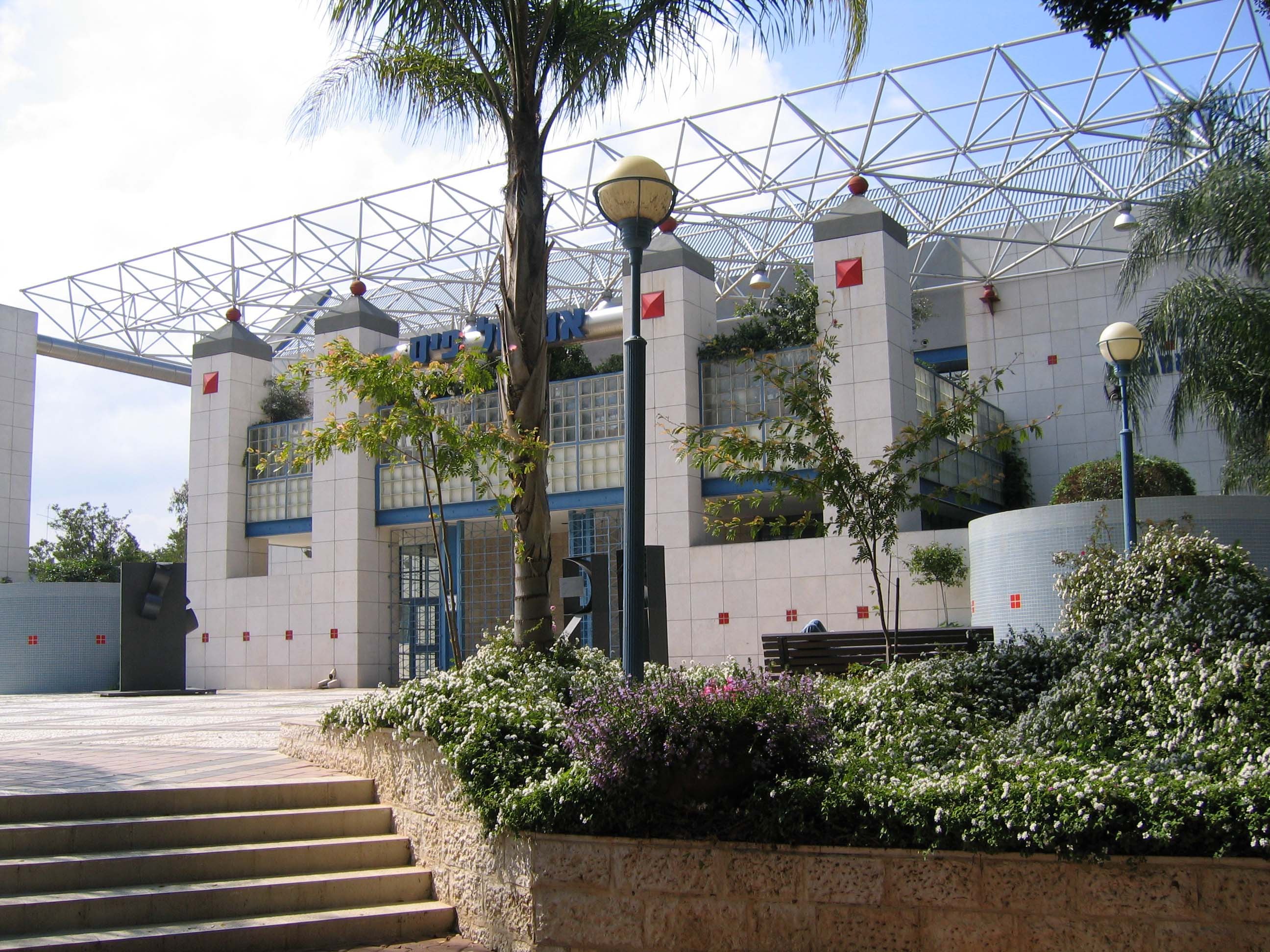
Payis Eshkol center for arts and science, Ramat Gan

Israeli schools are divided into four different tracks: state-secular (Mamlachti), state-religious (Mamlachti dati), independent religious (חרדי Haredi or חינוך עצמאי Ḥinuch Atzmai), and Arab. There are also private schools which reflect the philosophies of specific groups of parents, such as democratic schools, or that are based on the curriculum of a foreign country, such as The American International School in Israel. The majority of Israeli children attend state schools. State-religious schools, catering to youngsters from the Orthodox sector (mainly Religious Zionist/Modern Orthodox), offer intensive Jewish studies programs, and emphasize tradition and observance. The Chinuch Atzmai schools focus almost entirely on Torah study and offer very little in terms of secular subjects. Schools in the Arab sector teach in Arabic, and offer a curriculum that emphasizes Arab history, religion, and culture.

In July 2026, the Ministry of Education issued uniform rules requiring public schools to permit students who request to lay tefillin to do so at designated times and places. Schools were also required to publish the tefillin rules with their general regulations, while participating students remained responsible for bringing their own tefillin and returning to class on time.

The proportions of pupils attending schools in the Haredi and Arab sectors are increasing; according to a demographic study published in 2009, Haredim and Arabs together will amount to 60% of Israel's elementary school population by 2030.

The Haredim's lack of mainstream education and consequent low participation in the workforce are regarded by many in Israel as a social problem. The Council for Higher Education announced in 2012 that it was investing NIS 180 million over the following five years to establish appropriate frameworks for the education of Haredim, focusing on specific professions. The Ministry of Education's statistics from 2014 show that only about 22% of Haredi students take matriculation exams, since Orthodox yeshivot mostly ignore core subjects. About 8% of Haredi students pass the exam. Miriam Ben-Peretz, professor emeritus of education at the University of Haifa and winner of the 2006 Israel Prize, notes: "More and more Israeli students don't have any foundation of knowledge, any basics — not in math, not in English, not in general...things have to change." Some Israelis who have been educated in Haredi yeshivas have established Leaving for Change (LFC), an organization seeking to sue the government for alleged failure to enforce Israel's law for compulsory education.

In 1984, the first integrated schools which had both Jewish and Arab students coexisting in a classroom were built by the residents of Neve Shalom – Wāħat as-Salām, a cooperative village founded by Arab and Jewish citizens of Israel. Today, this school receives some support from the state. Two more integrated schools were opened in Jerusalem and Galilee (Galil Jewish-Arab School) in 1997 by Hand in Hand: Center for Jewish Arab Education in Israel. As of 2010, there were five integrated schools in Israel, including Neve Shalom.

== Israeli Pupils’ Rights Law ==
The Israeli Pupils’ Rights Law of 2000 prohibits discrimination of students for sectarian reasons in admission to or expulsion from an educational institution, in establishment of separate educational curricula or holding of separate classes in the same educational institution, and addresses rights and obligations of pupils. The law was fully supported by the Israeli Student and Youth Council.

== Societal approach to education ==
Israeli culture views higher education as the key to higher mobility and socioeconomic status in Israeli society. For millennia medieval European antisemitism often forbade the Jews from owning land and farming, which limited their career choices for making a decent living. This forced many Jews to place a much higher premium on education allowing them to seek alternative career options that involved entrepreneurial and white-collar professional pursuits such as merchant trading, science, medicine, law, accountancy, and moneylending as these professions required higher levels of verbal, mathematical, and scientific literacy. The emphasis of education within Israeli society has its modern roots at least since the Jewish diaspora from the Renaissance and Enlightenment Movement all the way to the roots of Zionism in the 1880s. Jewish communities in the Levant were the first to introduce compulsory education for which the organized community, not less than the parents, was responsible for the education of the next generation. With contemporary Jewish culture's strong emphasis, promotion of scholarship and learning and the strong propensity to promote cultivation of intellectual pursuits as well as the nation's high university educational attainment rate exemplifies how highly Israeli society values higher education.

Israel's populace is well educated and Israeli society highly values education. Education is a core value in Jewish culture and in Israeli society at large with many Israeli parents sacrificing their own personal comforts and financial resources to provide their children with the highest standards of education possible. Much of the Israeli Jewish population seek education as a passport to a decent white collar professional job and a middle class paycheck in the country's competitive high-tech economy. Jewish parents take great responsibility to inculcate the value of education in their children at a young age. Striving for high academic achievement and educational success is stressed in many modern Jewish Israeli households as parents make sure that their children are well educated adequately in order to gain the necessary technological skills needed for employment success to compete in Israel's modern high-tech job market. Israelis see competency with in demand job skills such as literacy in math and science as especially necessary for employment success in Israel's competitive 21st-century high-tech economy. Israel's Jewish population maintains a relatively high level of educational attainment where just under half of all Israeli Jews (46%) hold post-secondary degrees. This figure has remained stable in their already high levels of educational attainment over recent generations. Israeli Jews (among those ages 25 and older) have average of 11.6 years of schooling making them one of the most highly educated of all major religious groups in the world. In Arab schools, the exam on Biblical studies is replaced by an exam on Muslim, Christian or Druze heritage. Maariv described the Christian Arabs sectors as "the most successful in education system", since Christians fared the best in terms of education in comparison to any other religion in Israel. Israeli children from Russian-speaking families have a higher bagrut pass rate at high-school level. Although amongst immigrant children born in the Former Soviet Union, the bagrut pass rate is highest amongst those families from European FSU states at 62.6%, and lower amongst those from Central Asian and Caucasian FSU states. In 2014, 61.5% of all Israeli twelfth graders earned a matriculation certificate.

== Role in economic development ==
As the Israeli economy is largely scientific and technological based, the labor market demands people who have achieved some form of higher education, particularly related to science and engineering in order to gain a competitive edge when searching for employment. In 2012, the country ranked second among OECD countries (tied with Japan and after Canada) for the percentage of 25 to 64-year-olds that have attained tertiary education with 46 percent compared with the OECD average of 32 percent. In addition, nearly twice as many Israelis aged 55–64 held a higher education degree compared to other OECD countries, with 47 percent holding an academic degree compared with the OECD average of 25%. It ranks fifth among OECD countries for the total expenditure on educational institutions as a percentage of GDP. In 2011, the country spent 7.3% of its GDP on all levels of education, comparatively more than the Organisation for Economic Cooperation and Development average of 6.3% and as a result has fostered an education system that helped transform the country and rapidly grow its economy over the past 70 years.

The Israeli education system has been praised for major role in spurring Israel's economic development and technological boom. Many international business leaders and organizations such as Microsoft founder Bill Gates and the technology giant IBM have praised Israel for its high quality of education in helping spur Israel's economic development.

== Matriculation (Bagrut) ==
High schools in Israel prepare students for the Israeli matriculation exams (bagrut). These are exams covering various academic disciplines, which are studied in one to five (sometimes up to 10) units (yehidot limud), usually of ascending difficulty. Students with a passing mark on the mandatory matriculation subjects (Hebrew language, English language, mathematics, scripture, history, civics and literature), who have been tested on at least 21 units, and passed at least one 5-unit exam, receive a full matriculation certificate. In 2006/7, 74.4% of Israeli 12th graders took the bagrut exams while only 46.3% were eligible for a matriculation certificate. In the Arab and Druze sectors, the figures were 35.6% and 43.7% respectively.

A Bagrut certificate and Bagrut scores often determine acceptance into elite military units, admission to academic institutions, and job prospects.

Below is a table illustrating the percentage of matriculation certificate recipients in Israel's largest cities, according to the Israel Central Bureau of Statistics (graduation year of 2002).

The Adva Center, a social issues think tank in Israel, says that about 15% of the matriculation certificates issued do not qualify the recipient for admission to Israel's universities.

City	Recipients (%)
Jerusalem	36
Tel Aviv	60.3
Haifa	64.3
Rishon LeZion	59.2
Ashdod	55.9
Ashkelon	58.5
Bat Yam	49.5
Beersheba	51.5
Holon	55.3
Netanya	52
Petah Tikva	57
Ramat Gan	65.3

== Higher education ==
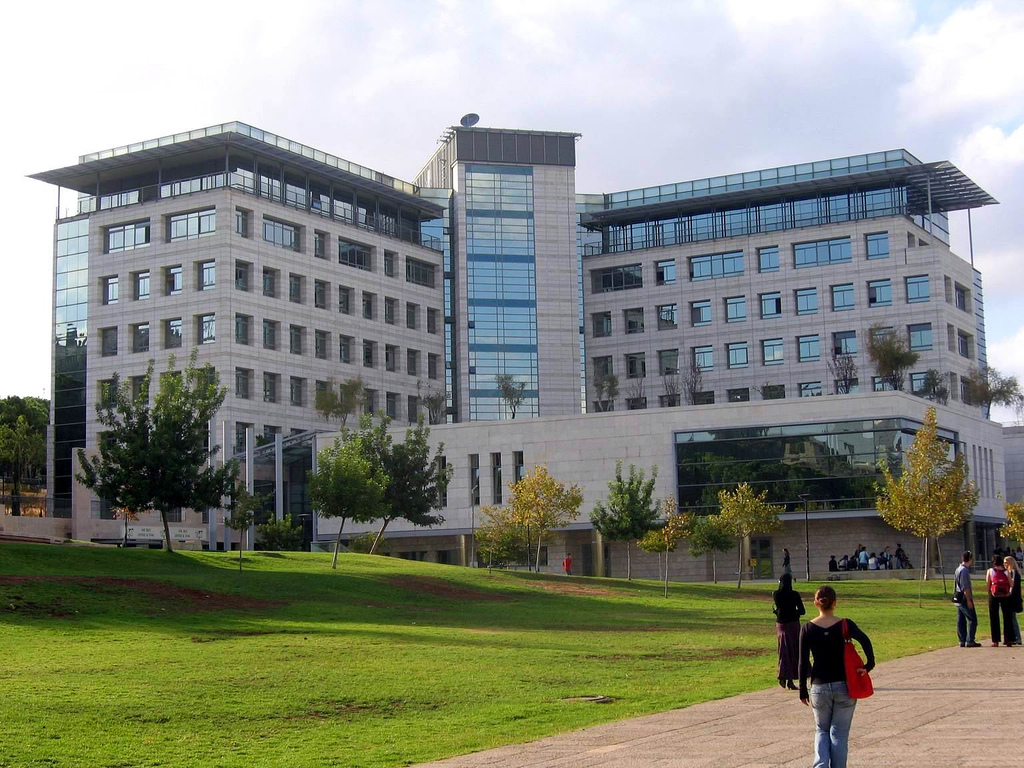
Computer science faculty building in the Technion - Israel Institute of Technology

After secondary education, students are generally conscripted into the Israel Defense Forces (IDF), but may request a postponement of the conscription date to study at a pre-service Mechina, undertake a voluntary service year, or study in a college or university. Those who study in a university at this stage generally do so under a program called atuda, where part of the tuition for their bachelor's degree is paid for by the army. They are however obliged to sign a contract with the army extending their service by 2–3 years.

Universities generally require a certain amount of bagrut matriculation units (as well as a certain grade average) and a good grade in the Psychometric Entrance Test, which is similar in many respects to the American SAT. The Psychometric Entrance Test (colloquially known in Hebrew simply as "psychometry" - psixometri, פסיכומטרי) is a standardized test used as a higher education admission exam. The PET covers three areas: quantitative reasoning, verbal reasoning and the English language. It is administered by the National Institute for Testing and Evaluation (NITE) and is heavily weighed for university admissions. The test may be taken in Hebrew, Arabic, Russian, French, Spanish, or combined Hebrew/English. The Open University of Israel accepts all applicants regardless of their academic history, though it still maintains high academic standards.

All of Israel's nine public universities (and some of their colleges) are subsidized by the government, and students pay only a small part of the actual cost of tuition. Students who have completed military service are entitled to a 90% discount on their first-year tuition fees. Further financial assistance is provided by student loans, grants, and scholarships approved by the Ministry of Education.

According to the OECD, the median age Israeli students complete their first degree is slightly above 27. From 2011 to 2018 there was an increase of 79% in the Arab student population of Israel. From 2012 to 2022 there was an increase of 133% in the Arab student population of Israeli universities.

=== Rankings ===
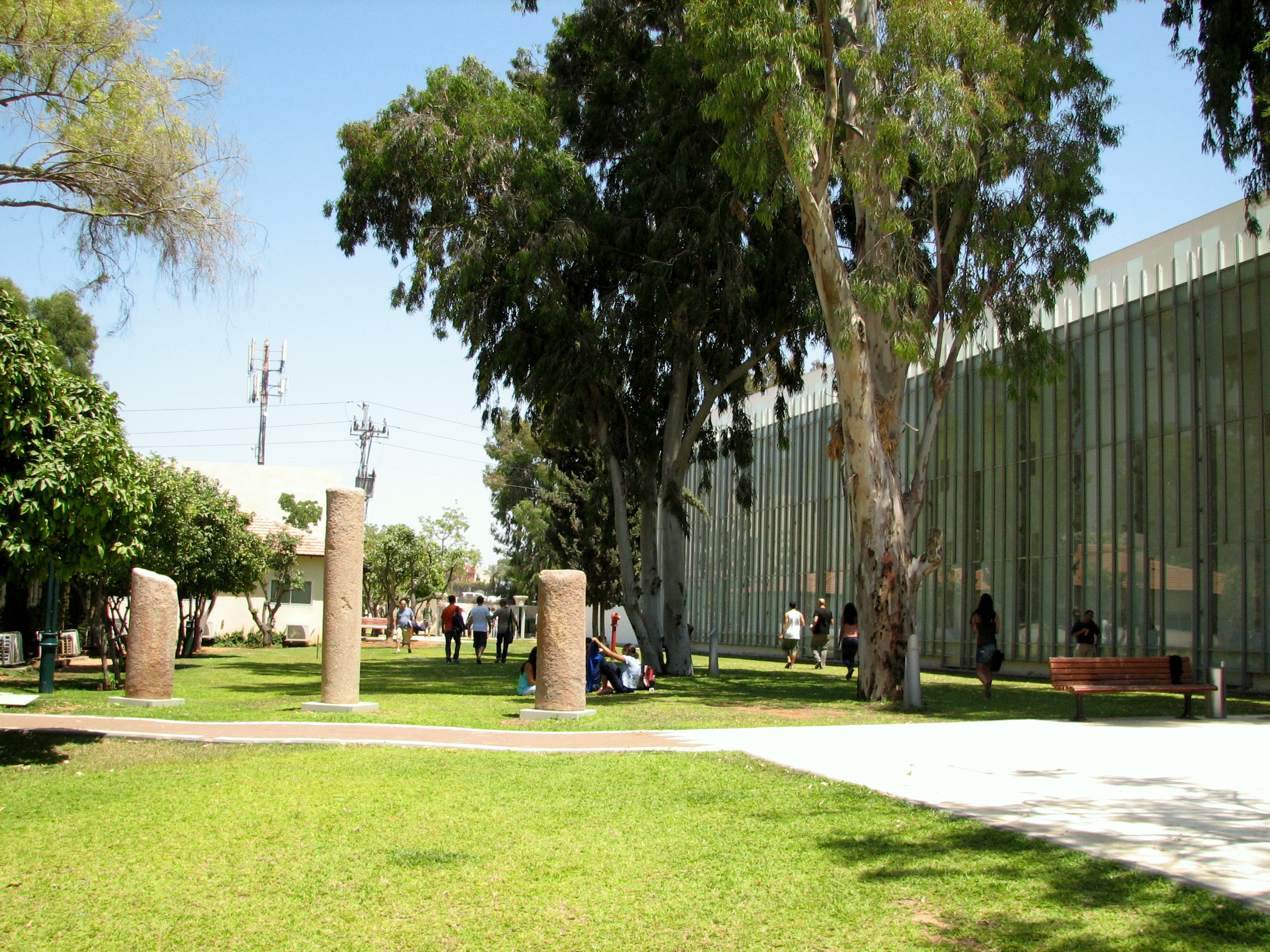
Interdisciplinary Center, Herzliya

According to the Webometrics ranking, six of Israel's universities place in the top 100 schools of Asia. Four universities place in the top 150 in the world according to the Shanghai Jiao Tong University Academic Ranking of World Universities, and three are in the Times Higher Education-QS World University Rankings (i.e. amongst the "Top 200 World Universities").

In addition, Israeli universities are among 100 of the top world universities in science and engineering-related subjects, according to the QS World University Rankings: mathematics (TAU, Hebrew University and Technion); physics (TAU, Hebrew University and Weizmann Institute of Science); chemistry (TAU, Hebrew University and Technion); computer science (TAU, Hebrew University, Weizmann Institute of Science, BIU and Technion); engineering (Technion); life sciences (Hebrew University).

In the social sciences, TAU and the Hebrew University rank in the top 100, and these universities are also ranked in the top 100 for economics; Israel is ranked 23rd on RePEc's Country and State Ranking for economics.

In 2010, Hebrew University reached 57th place in the global ranking list published by Shanghai Jiao Tong University in China.

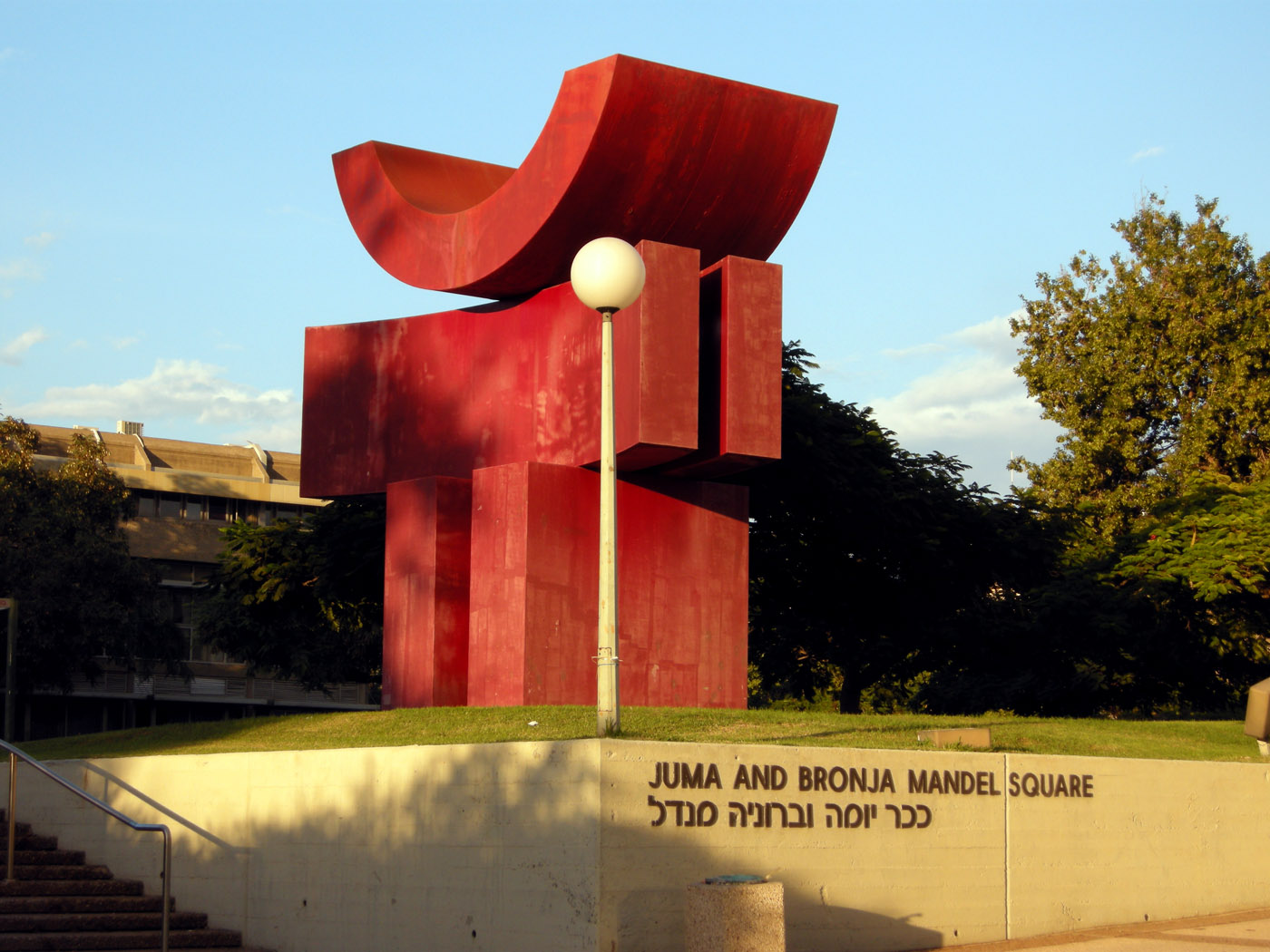
Tel Aviv University

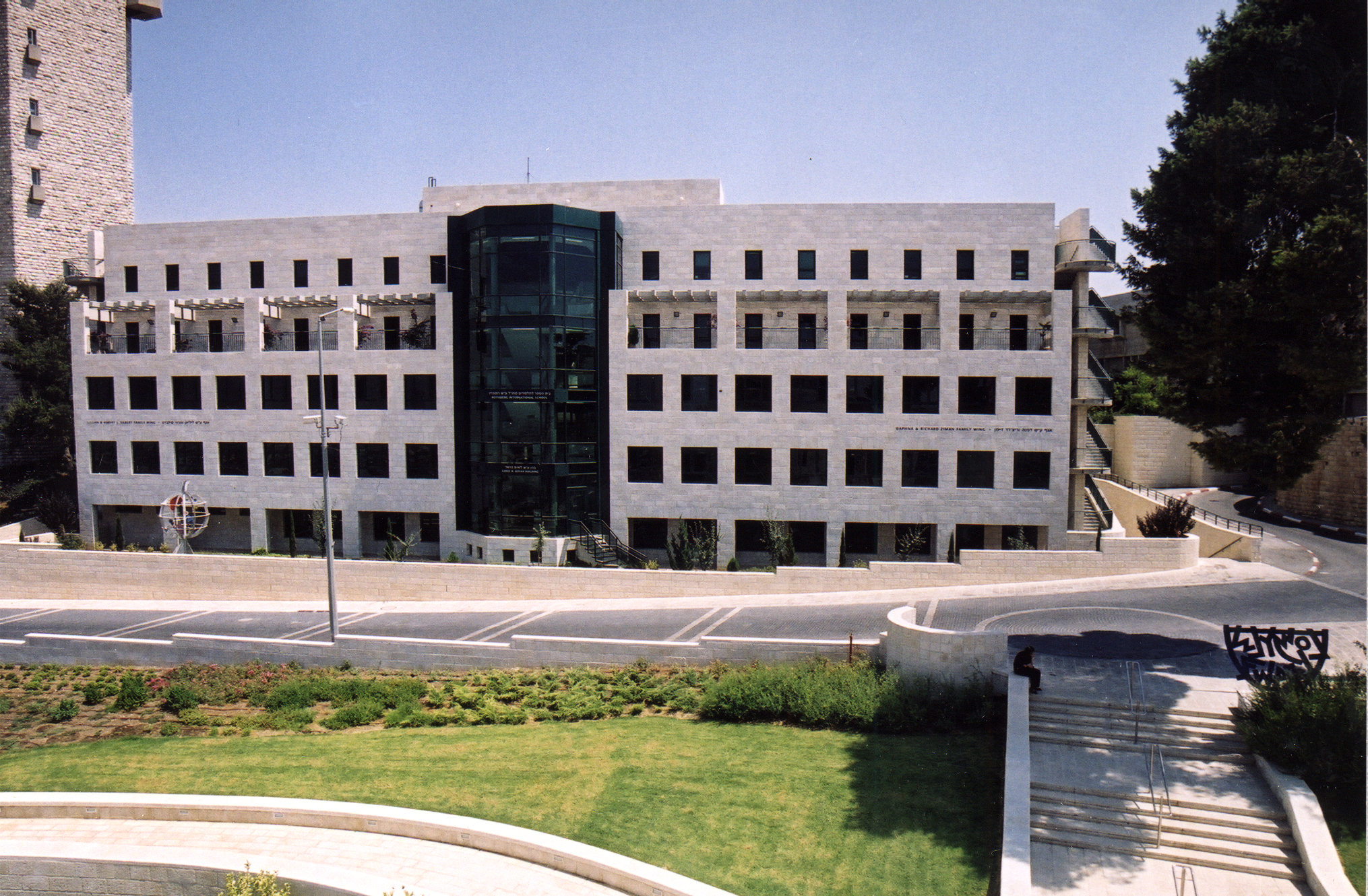
Hebrew University of Jerusalem

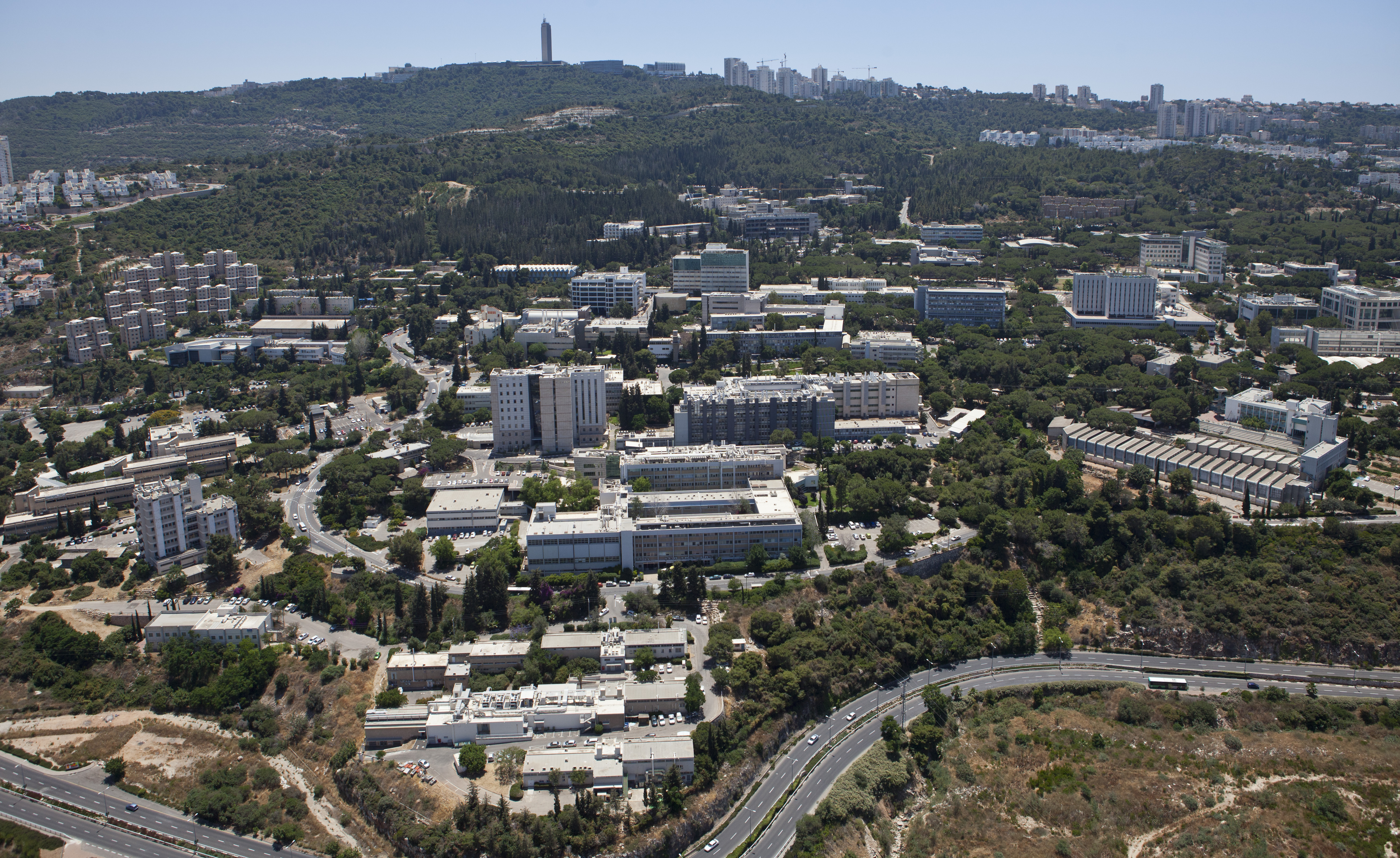
Technion

Of note, NYU, which enrolls the largest number of Jewish students of any public or private university in the United States, and is ranked in the top 34 globally in all major publications of university rankings, has a campus in Tel Aviv.

== Comparisons with other countries ==
Despite strong post-secondary rankings, Israel spends less per student than countries like Norway and Mexico.

Some officials have criticized the claim that the strong test scores prove Israel is a highly educated country, pointing out that scores from standardized tests exclude Haredi and special education students, and thus are not an accurate reflection. Israeli teachers must contend with large classes, low wages and low morale. Despite this, Israel ranks second among OECD countries (tied with Japan and just after Canada) for the percentage of 25- to 64-year-olds that have achieved tertiary education: 46% compared with an OECD average of 32%. Inequality is a problem reflected in Israel's performance on international tests. In the latest PISA exams, in which half a million students from 65 countries participated, Israel ranked 33 in reading achievement and 40th in mathematics and science. Only Taiwan had larger gaps in the performance between the best and worst students.

== Arab sector ==
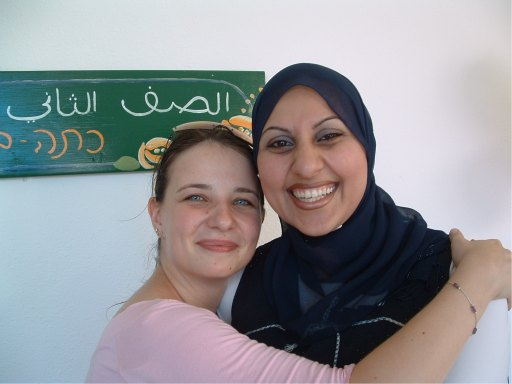
Jewish and Arab teachers at Hand in Hand

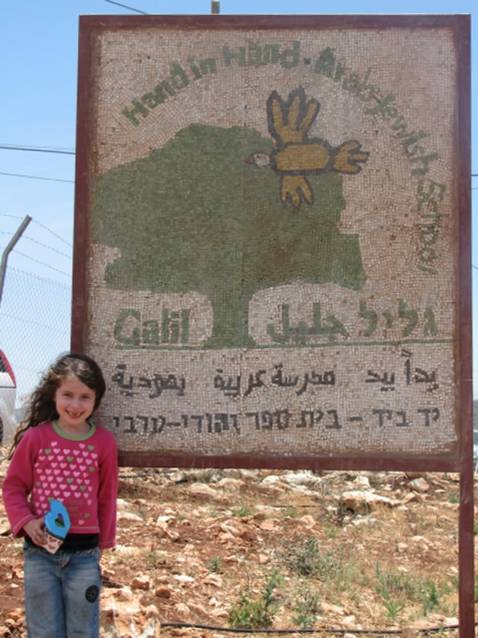
A student at the Galil Jewish–Arab School.

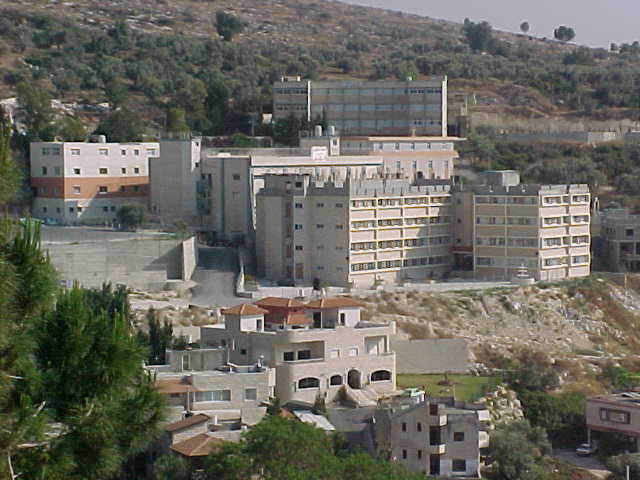
Mar Elias, a kindergarten, elementary, junior high, and high school, and college in Ibillin.

Israel operates an Arab education system for the Israeli-Arab minority, teaching Arab students, in Arabic, about their history and culture. Israel is a signatory of the Convention against Discrimination in Education, and ratified it in 1961. The convention has the status of law in Israeli courts. However, there have been claims that the Jewish education system gets more resources. According to the Follow-Up Committee for Arab Education, the Israeli government spends an average of $192 per year on each Arab student, and $1,100 per Jewish student. It also notes that drop-out rate for Israeli Arab citizens is twice as high as that of their Jewish counterparts (12 percent versus 6 percent). The same group also noted that in 2005, there was a 5,000-classroom shortage in the Arab sector.

According to a 2016 study by the Pew Research Center, 33% of Jews (based on a sample of 3,020) have a college degree (ranging from 13% for Haredi to 45% for Hiloni), compared to 18% for Christians (based on a sample of 375).

Christian Arabs tend to have had the highest rates of success in the matriculation examinations, both in comparison to the Muslims and the Druze, and in comparison to all students in the Jewish education system. Arab Christians were also the vanguard in terms of eligibility for higher education, and they have attained a bachelor's degree and academic degree more than the median Israeli population. The rate of students studying in the field of medicine was also higher among the Christian Arab students, compared with all the students from other sectors. The percentage of Arab Christian women who are higher education students is higher than other sectors.

In 1999, in attempt to close the gap between Arab and Jewish education sectors, the Israeli education minister, Yossi Sarid, announced an affirmative action policy, promising that Arabs would be granted 25% of the education budget, more than their proportional share in the population (18%). He also added that the ministry would support the creations of an Arab academic college.

In 2001, a Human Rights Watch report stated that students in government-run Arab schools received inferior education due to fewer teachers, inadequate school construction, and lack of libraries and recreational space. Jewish schools were found to be better equipped, some offering film editing studios and theater rooms. In 2009, Sorel Cahan of Hebrew University's School of Education claimed that the average per-student budget allocation for students with special needs at Arab junior high schools was five times lower.

In 2007, the Israeli Education Ministry announced a plan to increase funding for schools in Arab communities. According to a ministry official, "At the end of the process, a lot of money will be directed toward schools with students from families with low education and income levels, mainly in the Arab sector." The Education Ministry prepared a five-year plan to close the gaps and raise the number of students eligible for high school matriculation.

A 2009 report showed that obstacles to Arab students participating in higher education resulted in over 5,000 moving to study in nearby Jordan. The Association for Civil Rights in Israel and various scholars have criticized wide disparities in education access between Jewish Israelis and Arab Israelis, and underfunding of Arab schools.

The Ministry of Education announced in April 2010 that the suggested curriculum for the coming school year would not include civics, democratic values, or Jewish-Arab coexistence, and focus more on Zionist and Jewish values.

In 2010, the number of computer science teachers in the Arab sector rose by 50%. The Arab sector also saw a rise of 165% in instructors teaching technology classes and a 171% increase in the number teaching mathematics. The number of physics teachers in Arab schools grew by 25%, those teaching chemistry by 44% and in biology by 81.7%.

According to a 2012 report by the Higher Arab Monitoring Committee, there is a shortage of 6,100 classrooms and 4,000 teachers in Arab communities.

In 2011, the Council for Higher Education introduced a 5-Year Plan to increase accessibility to higher education among Arab, Druze and Circassian students. The first plan ran through 2015/16, and was subsequently extended through 2021/22. The plan is being implemented in 30 institutions of higher education that receive their budgets from the CHE's Planning and Budgeting Committee, and where the student body includes Arab, Druze, and Circassian students. The program relates holistically to the many stages involved in succeeding in higher education: from providing information and guidance in grades 11 and 12, to offering pre-academic preparatory courses, to financial support while studying, to assistance in transitioning to the labor market. There are scholarships for excellence in postgraduate studies and academic staff. Beyond assistance to the individual students, a special effort is made to address the overall organizational culture of the institutions in terms of the degree to which they are culturally inclusive.

Beyond governmental 5-Year Plans, nonprofit partnerships have played a growing role in closing educational gaps. Through its Ruad ("Pioneers") program, Aluma - Youth for Change provides academic guidance, mentoring, and scholarships for Arab, Druze, and Circassian students across 20 higher education institutions.

== Gender statistics ==
The dropout rates in grades 8–12 is higher for males than females. In 2011, the dropout rate declined, but was still higher among males, with 4.5% of male and 1.7% of female students dropping out of school. In addition, the passing rate of high school matriculation exams stood at 62% for females and 51% for males. The rate of women studying in universities and colleges is also higher; in 2011–2012, 56.7% of students at academic institutions were female. In 2012, women were also 59.3% of candidates for Master's degree programs and 52.4% for doctorate programs.

However, 81% of Israeli professors are men. In addition, fields such as engineering, electricity, physics, mathematics, computer science, and natural sciences are overwhelmingly male-dominated, though there are a large number of women in certain fields of engineering, such as biomedical, industrial, and environmental engineering. Women tend to study more in human and social sciences, such as education and occupational therapy.

== Status of teachers ==
Over the years, government budget cuts have taken their toll. Israel was amongst the top-ranked nations in international rankings for science and mathematics performance in the 1960s, but dropped to 33 out of 41 nations in the 2002 survey. Wages for Israeli teachers are low compared to other industrialized countries, especially due to the small amount of frontal teaching hours with respect to other developed countries (the salary per hour is similar to that of the OECD standards), according to a survey of the Organisation for Economic Co-operation and Development. The government-appointed Dovrat Commission, led by Shlomo Dovrat, concluded in 2004, that the key to improving Israeli education is not more money but better-quality teaching. The recommendations included a reform giving school principals the right to fire teachers of poor quality, and reward better ones with higher pay. These moves have been blocked by Israel's teachers' unions, which have paralyzed schools with a series of long strikes, mostly blocking the proposed reforms.

== Textbooks ==
According to a paper by Nurit Peled-Elhanan, a professor of language and education at the Hebrew University of Jerusalem, textbooks in Israel promote a negative image of Arabs. The Center for Monitoring the Impact of Peace, a schoolbook monitoring organization, disputed this finding, calling her claim heavily politicized and distorted.

In a report published in 2000, the Center for Monitoring the Impact of Peace stated that in textbooks of both the general state-run network and the religious state-run network, there was a genuine effort to remove stereotypes and to build a foundation for coexistence and mutual respect.

According to a 2011 report by the Arab Cultural Association, Arabic textbooks provided to third to ninth grade students in Israeli schools were found to contain many mistakes. The report was based on a study of textbooks in all subjects. Dr. George Mansour, who examined the history textbooks, said they ignored the presence of Arab-Palestinians in Israel and minimized Arab culture.

== Strikes ==
Israeli schools and universities have been subject to repeated strikes over the years by faculty, and, occasionally, by students. The 2007 Israeli student strike started in April 2007 in protest at the government decision to increase tuition fees and the failure to implement the 2001 Winograd Committee recommendation that they be reduced by 25%. After three weeks, the universities threatened that all students who failed to return to their studies would have to retake the semester. Student leaders rejected a compromise which would have exempted students from the fee rises. Some students started a hunger strike. The strike ended on 14 May after student leaders accepted the implementation of the Shochat reforms. Middle and secondary school teachers were on strike for a month and a half. Their demands included an 8.5% pay raise, reducing class sizes to a maximum of 30 students, and increasing the length of the school day. The school year was extended until 10 July 2008 for all schools that participated in the strike.

== Awards and recognition ==
Each year, municipalities may receive an award for outstanding education initiatives and accomplishments. The 2012 Education Prize of the Israeli Ministry of Education and Culture was awarded to the municipalities of Ariel, Ashdod, Yokneam, Ma'aleh Adumim, Safed and Kiryat Bialik. The educational networks of these cities were cited for their unique projects, effectiveness of immigrant absorption, student empowerment, educational leadership, top-quality teaching, encouragement of entrepreneurship and innovation, and promoting excellence in a diverse school population.

== See also ==
- Academic grading in Israel
- Ministry of Education (Israel)
- First Step to Nobel Prize in Physics
- List of universities and colleges in Israel
- Science and technology in Israel
- Scientific Leadership
- The Streams Method in the Israeli education
- Yeshiva
