= Bagrut certificate =

High school certificate in Israel

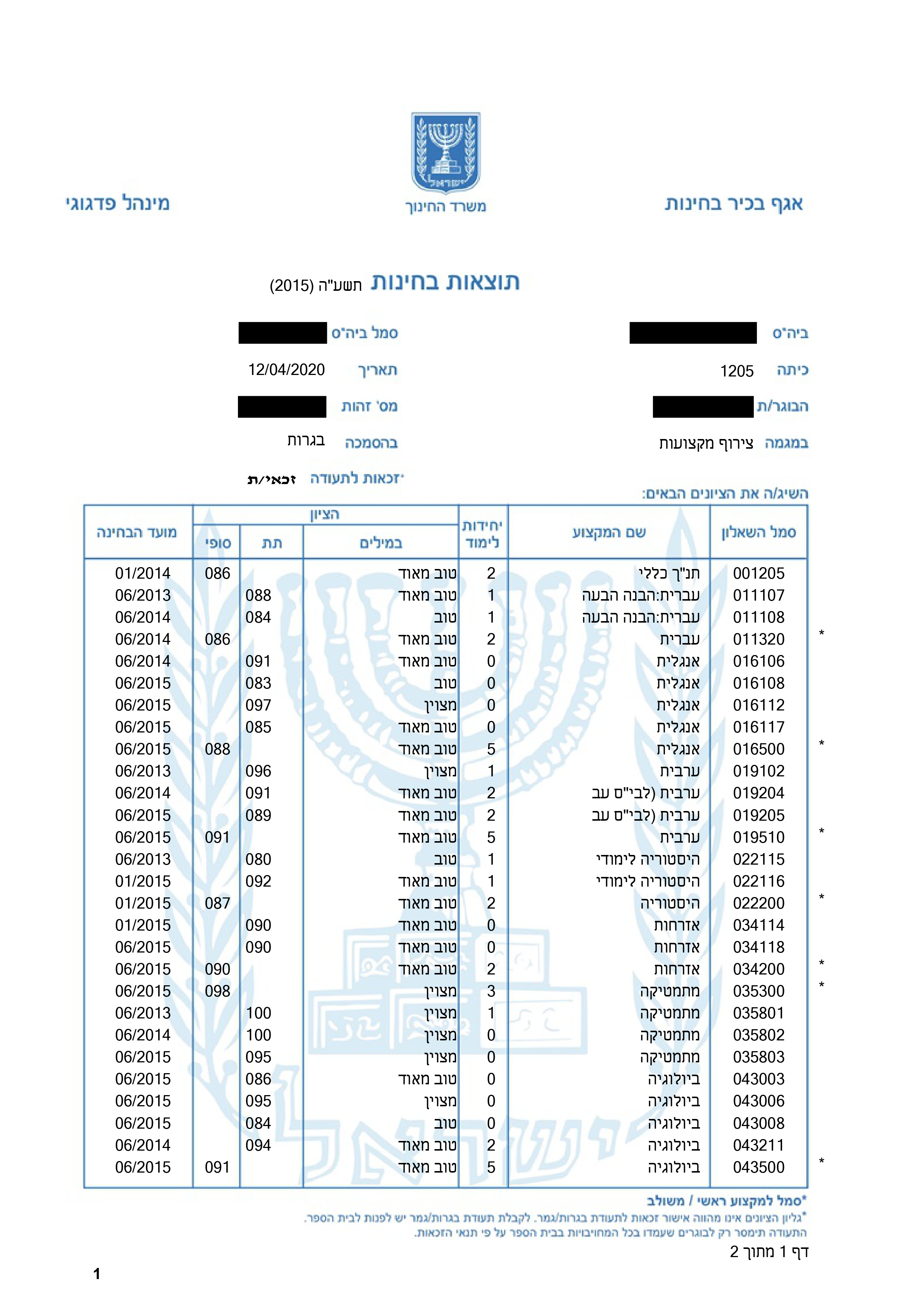
Bagrut certificate

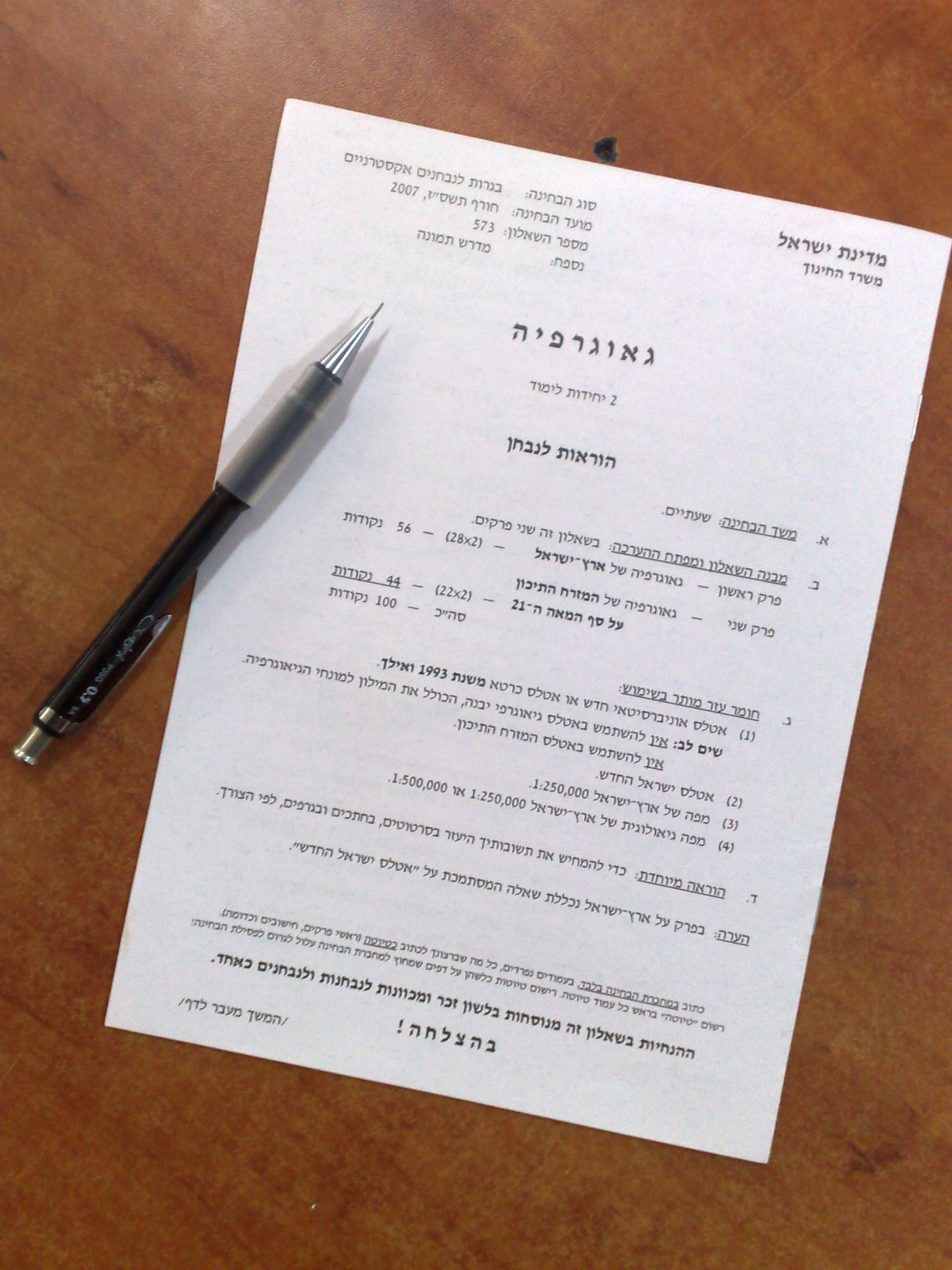
Bagrut exam sheet In Geography

Te'udat Bagrut (Hebrew: תעודת בגרות, lit. 'graduation certificate'; Arabic: شهادة بجروت) is a certificate that attests that a student has successfully passed Israel's high school matriculation examination. Bagrut is generally a prerequisite for higher education in Israel.

== Overview ==
A Bagrut certificate is awarded by the Israeli Ministry of Education to students who pass the ministry's required written (and in some cases oral) subject-matter examinations with a passing mark (55% or higher) in each exam. The Bagrut certificate however should not be confused with a high school diploma (te'udat g'mar tichon, Hebrew: תעודת גמר תיכון، Arabic: شهادة انهاء الثانويّة), which is a certificate awarded by the Ministry of Education attesting that a student has completed 12 years of study. Bagrut scores are one of the criteria examined in applications to elite military units and Israeli academic institutions. Other criteria include students' high school grades and the Psychometric Entrance Test.

Bagrut exams are frequently compared to the New York State Regents Examinations, the College Board's Advanced Placement (AP) tests, the British A-levels, the German Abitur, and the European Matura.

== Bagrut exams ==
Bagrut examinations assess knowledge on subjects studied in high school. The process of matriculation in Israel is supervised by the country's Ministry of Education. The exams of all compulsory subjects and most elective subjects are designed and written by the Ministry, thereby creating a standard measure of the students' knowledge throughout the country. In academically oriented high schools, the last two years of studies are geared to preparing students for the bagrut exams.

=== Compulsory subjects ===
- 3–5 units of English language (written and oral) and literature
- 3–5 units of Mathematics
- 2 units Civics
- 2 units General and Israeli history
- 2 units Hebrew/Arabic and translated world literature (+Jewish thought in state religious schools)
- At least one 5-unit elective, such as geography, physics, chemistry, biology, computer science, Arabic, French, social sciences, expanded physical education etc. It is also possible to expand a 2 unit discipline to 5 units, or to write an academic-style thesis worth 5 units in a certain discipline.

School dependent subjects

- Religious Scriptures:
  - State schools – 2 units Hebrew Bible
  - State religious schools – 3 units Hebrew Bible, 3 units Oral Torah and Talmud
  - Arab schools – 1 unit Muslim, Christian or Druze culture and heritage ("religion and heritage" for Christians)
- Language
  - Hebrew-language schools – 2 units Hebrew grammar and composition
  - Arabic-language schools – 3 units Arabic grammar and composition, 3 units Hebrew grammar and composition

Internal subjects compulsory only for students who studied in a traditional high-school setting (not included in grade average)

- 180 hours physical education (60 a year over 3 years)
- Two "general education" subjects, 30 hours each
- 90 hours introduction to science (3 hours a week for one year)
- 180 hours volunteer work

=== Scoring and pass rate ===
Most exams are available in different levels of difficulty, expressed in "units of study". In most subjects, students may choose the number of units in which they are tested. In order to receive a "full" matriculation certificate, the student must take and pass at least one subject matter exam at the 5-unit level of difficulty and earn a total of at least 21 combined study units in all bagrut exams taken. Correspondingly, the make-up of students' classes during their high school years is matched to the students' expected units of study in which they will be tested in their bagrut exams. For example, students planning to take the 5-unit mathematics exam will take mathematics courses specifically designed for a 5-unit level of difficulty all throughout their high school careers.

65.5% of Israeli high school 2014 graduates, or other individuals studying for the 2014 exam (usually post-compulsory military service persons completing Bagrut requirements later in life in order to apply for higher education) had passed the requirements to be eligible to receive a Bagrut certificate. Of the overall population who was of high school graduation age in 2019, 76.1% were eligible to receive a Bagrut certificate.

== Recent history ==
A copy of the 2010 mathematics exam (in the four and five units levels) was leaked to students, but a teacher reported it to authorities and all tests were replaced.

In 2011, the percentage of 17-year-olds who passed the matriculation exams rose to 48.3 percent, and the number of students sitting for the exams in both the Jewish and the Arab school systems increased.

In 2021, all the bagrut exams materials have been temporarily decreased to ensure a high passing rate due to the coronavirus pandemic that prevented students from going to schools as they would normally do.

In the last decade, bagrut exams are still being leaked 5–10 minutes before the exams' start time.

== See also ==
- Education in Israel
