= Psychometric Entrance Test =

Entrance exam for institutions of higher education in Israel

The Psychometric Entrance Test (PET) – commonly known in Hebrew as "ha-Psikhometri" (The Psychometric) – is a standardized test that serves as an entrance exam for institutions of higher education in Israel. The PET covers three areas: quantitative reasoning, verbal reasoning and proficiency in the English language. It is administered by the National Institute for Testing and Evaluation (NITE) and plays a considerable role in the admissions process. A score combining students' performance on the PET with the average score of their high school matriculation tests (aka Bagrut) has been found to be a highly predictive indicator of students' academic performance in their first year of higher education.

The test may be taken in Hebrew, Arabic, Russian, French, or combined Hebrew/English. There are four test administration dates each year: April, July, September, and December (the dates vary depending on local holidays and on the start and end dates of the academic semester). It can be taken in Hebrew and Arabic on any of the four dates, and in Russian, French and combined Hebrew/English, on two of the four dates. The test results are valid for university admissions purposes for seven years.

== Purpose ==
According to NITE, the sole purpose of the PET is to predict candidates' chances of success in academic studies. The test is used to assess all candidates on a standard scale. This scale, combined with the high school matriculation test results, allows the various admissions departments to rank the candidates applying to their institution.

Extensive research shows that the PET scores can predict success in higher education more accurately than any other single tool. In addition, it has been shown that the combination of the PET and matriculation results has better predictive power than any other combination of existing screening tools.

== Structure ==
The PET consists of nine sections, each of which belongs to one of the following domains: verbal reasoning, quantitative reasoning, and English. The first section, part of the verbal reasoning domain, is the writing task. It is followed by eight sections of multiple-choice questions – two sections from each of the three domains and two "pilot sections." Pilot sections look like regular test sections but are not included in the computation of the PET score. These sections are used for equating and standardizing between different test administrations and for assessing the functioning of items that will be used in future tests. The sections are built in such a way that it is not possible to know which are for "pilot" purposes, therefore the examinees must give all sections equal attention. NITE states that every PET may contain sections or items that were used in previous tests, and that new types of questions may appear in any of the domains, along with changes in instructions for solving them, in the number of questions in a section, and in the time allotted.

=== Writing task ===
The section that comprises the writing task is part of the verbal reasoning domain. Examinees taking the test in Hebrew have 30 minutes to complete this section and examinees taking the test in other languages have 35 minutes. Examinees are required to write an essay of at least 25 lines on a given topic. The essay should be written in an academic style with a clear and well-reasoned presentation and discussion of an argument. The writing task constitutes 25% of the verbal reasoning score and is rated on the basis of two dimensions – language and content. The score for each dimension ranges from 1 to 6. The score for content relates to the quality of the arguments presented, as well as the quality and complexity of critical thinking demonstrated. The score for the language dimension relates to wording, writing style, and language level. These components are the basis for good academic writing, and candidates who do not have a sufficient grasp of them will find it difficult to present their knowledge in written form. Each examinee's writing task is evaluated by two independent raters. The final score for the writing task is a weighting of the four scores given by the two reviewers. In the end, the examinees receive one score for the verbal reasoning domain, and it includes the weighted score for the writing task. Therefore, the examinees cannot know the score given to them for the writing task.

=== Verbal reasoning ===
As of 2020, the verbal reasoning section in the Hebrew PET contains 23 questions (20, in other languages) and is allotted 20 minutes. The types of questions in the verbal section are:

- Analogies – This type of item examines three components of verbal ability: vocabulary, the ability to recognize a relationship between two words or phrases, and the ability to identify that same relationship in another set of words or phrases.
- Critical Reading and Inference – These questions relate to various abilities: comprehension of a short text, inference (drawing conclusions from the text, identifying what argument weakens a conclusion presented in the text, and so forth), sentence completion, and more.
- Text Comprehension – A complex text (usually a synopsis of an academic article) is presented together with a number of reading comprehension questions.

There is a gradual increase in the difficulty level in the order of the questions, except for the text comprehension questions (which are arranged in the order in which the question topic appears in the text).

As mentioned, the verbal reasoning score obtained by the examinees is the weighting of the score given for the section of multiple-choice questions together with that given for the writing task section. It is not possible to know the exact score of each.

=== Quantitative reasoning ===
As of 2020, the quantitative reasoning section contains 20 questions covering various areas of mathematics, such as geometry, algebra, percentages, averages, ratio questions, drawing conclusions from a diagram, and so on. The allotted time is 20 minutes.

For the most part, the difficulty level of questions in the section increases – as the more difficult questions appear last. The mathematical knowledge required for the quantitative reasoning section is similar to that required for the high school matriculation examination in mathematics at the three-unit level – the minimum level required for obtaining a high school matriculation certificate and for admission to academic studies.

=== English ===
As of 2020, the English section contains 22 questions and the allotted time is 20 minutes. This section tests the examinee's proficiency in the English language; there are three types of questions:

- Sentence Completion – This question type examines the vocabulary level of the examinee and the ability to infer meaning from context.
- Restatement – This item type consists of a sentence followed by four possible ways of restating the main idea of that sentence. Examinees are required to choose a restatement which best expresses the meaning of the original sentence.
- Reading comprehension – Two relatively long texts are presented, each of which is followed by several reading comprehension questions.
- The difficulty level of the questions in each section of the section increases gradually, except for the reading comprehension section (where the questions are arranged in the order in which the question topic appears in the text).

== Scores ==
Applicants can access their score by logging on to the NITE website within 45 days of the test date. The scores are also sent to the applicants separately by mail and forwarded to the major academic institutions in Israel – Ben-Gurion University of the Negev, Bar-Ilan University, University of Haifa, Hebrew University of Jerusalem, Tel Aviv University and Technion – Israel Institute of Technology in Haifa. The scores will also be sent to any additional higher education institutions specified by applicants on their registration form. The report includes the following details:

1. The score in each of the three test domains: verbal reasoning, quantitative reasoning, and English.
2. The three final PET scores, based on different weightings of the three domain scores,

The scores in the PET range from 200 to 800, and are a weighted average of the scores in the three test domains, the quantitative and verbal domains each comprise 40% of the score and the English domain comprises the remaining 20%. The scores in each field individually range from 50 to 150, depending on the number of errors in that field, as well as other statistical calculations. The purpose of these calculations is to ensure the score is not affected by the test administration date chosen.

As of October 2012, apart from the general PET score, two additional scores are calculated for examinees:

The quantitative-oriented score is calculated as follows: 60% for the quantitative reasoning domain, while the verbal and English sections are weighted at 20% each.

The verbal-oriented score is calculated as follows: 60% for the verbal reasoning section, while the quantitative reasoning and English domains are weighted at 20% each.

Each academic institution can select which score to consider for admissions to their departments.

In addition the English score is used to determine the English language level of the examinees and for placement in English courses at the appropriate level.

The final PET score is a relative score. This means that the personal score reflects the ability of the examinee in the different domains relative to other examinees. The score distribution is roughly a normal distribution, with an average of 548 and a standard deviation of 108.2 (as of 2018). As usual in a normal distribution, as you move away from the average, the score becomes less common: according to NITE, in 2018, about five thousand examines (representing about 5.7% of all examines in that ) received a score of 701 or higher, of which only 3 achieved a score of 791 or higher. About 1,800 examines (constituting 3.2% of those who took the test in the same year) received a score equal to or less than 350.

== Preparation ==
Familiarity with the test format and with the types of questions that appear in the test can benefit the examinees. Therefore, NITE recommends that examinees review item types and the various test instructions. For this purpose, NITE offers sample tests on its site. Also, as of February 2009, NITE is required to publish a test form after each test date.

To help the students prepare for the test effectively, private companies throughout the country offer preparatory courses for the test. In early 2019, following public criticism and protest at the costs of these courses, the Ministry of Social Equality in collaboration with NITE launched a free online preparatory course for the Hebrew PET.

According to a study conducted by NITE, examines who have prepared for the test with the help of a preparatory course have improved their score by only a few points compared to the score increase obtained by students who prepared on their own.

In general, the score of those who take the test two or more times is higher than that of those who take the test for the first time. This phenomenon has several possible explanations, and does not prove that retaking the test necessarily leads to an improved score.

== Other tests ==
In addition to the PET, NITE administers Hebrew and English language proficiency tests, which are used by the universities for admissions and for placement of applicants in language courses at the appropriate level.

AMIR, AMIRAM – English Proficiency Tests: These tests assess examinees' level of English and allow them to obtain a score in English without having to take the PET. The score given on these tests is comparable to the score given on the English section of the PET.

YAEL, YAELNET – Hebrew Proficiency Tests: These tests are intended to assess an examinees' proficiency in Hebrew and are used for placement in Hebrew language course at the appropriate level. Most institutions of higher education in Israel require a YAEL score as part of the entrance procedure for examinees who have taken the PET in a language other than Hebrew; or who were not required to take the PET and took high school matriculation tests (Bagrut) in a language other than Hebrew. An examinee is allowed to take the YAEL immediately following the PET (in which case there is no test fee). It can also be taken as a stand-alone test (usually intended for those whose mother tongue is not Hebrew).

== Arguments Against the PET Requirement ==
Opposition to the PET as an admissions requirement is voiced by some who argue that examinees of certain socio-cultural backgrounds tend to be more successful than others. Also, it has been argued that the structure and content of the test may make it difficult for examinees with learning disabilities. Another claim is that the high cost of pre-exam preparatory courses pose an obstacle to candidates with financial difficulties, which means that candidates from a better socio-economic background have an advantage.

The issue of the extent to which pre-exam preparatory courses contribute to success on the PET is a matter of debate, and according to a study by NITE, the advantage gained by such courses is negligible when compared to the results of students who prepared for the test on their own. This argument in any case holds less weight, given that there is now a free online preparatory course for the PET.

In January 2014, the Minister of Education at the time announced the intention to cancel the PET and allow higher education admissions to be based solely on high school matriculation results. However, because of opposition from university deans (based on doubts regarding the soundness and reliability of matriculation results), the PET was not canceled and continues to be one of the major assessment tools in higher education admissions in Israel. Only candidates with exceptional matriculation results will be considered for admission without a PET score.

== Admissions Without PET Requirement ==
In 2016, higher education institutions in Israel began publicizing the possibility of admissions without the PET requirement. In some institutions, admissions to certain fields of study would be possible based only on the matriculation scores. Another option was the Open University Transition program: students could take several courses at the Open University – where matriculation and PET scores are not required for admission – and, based on their achievements in these courses, could later transfer to other academic institutions. In some institutions, it was decided that admissions would be based on a candidate's achievements on online courses, weighed together with their matriculation scores.

== See also ==
- Bagrut certificate
