= Afek =

Afek or Aphik (Hebrew: אֲפֵק) may refer to:

== Places in the biblical Land of Israel ==
- Aphek (biblical) refers to a number of sites with the same name mentioned in the Bible
- Aphik (Asher) one of the biblical sites belonging to the Tribe of Asher
  - Aphaca, a city in classical Syria believed by some to be the Asherite city:
    - Afka, a modern town at the site in Lebanon
  - Tel Afek, a site located near Haifa believed by some to be the Asherite city
    - Afek, Israel, a kibbutz located at the tell near Haifa
- Another site known as Tel Afek, classical Antipatris, near Petah Tikva and Rosh HaAyin
- Migdal Afek, Latin name Aphek Turris, also near Rosh HaAyin
- A site in the Golan Heights:
  - Fiq, Syria, a former Syrian village
  - Afik, a current Israeli settlement and kibbutz there
  - Fiq Airfield, a small civilian airfield near the settlement/kibbutz
- Afikim, a kibbutz in the Galilee nearby, but unrelated to the Golan Heights site

== Other uses ==
- Afek (surname), Hebrew-language surname
- Afek (mythology), a cultural heroine in some Papuan groups' mythology
- Afek Oil & Gas, a subsidiary of Genie Energy Ltd. and controls Genie Energy Ltd.'s oil and gas exploratory project in Northern Israel, including the Golan Heights region
- Battle of Aphek, in which the Philistines defeated the Israelite army and captured the Ark of the Covenant

== See also ==
- Fiq (disambiguation)
