= Kurdana =

Kurdana may refer to the following:

- Tell Kurdana, or Tel Afek, an archaeological site near Acre in modern Israel.
- Kurdana River, the Ottoman-era name for the Na'aman River near Acre.
