= Fiq =

Fiq or FIQ may refer to:

== Places ==
=== Ethiopia ===
- Fiq, Ethiopia
- Fiq (woreda)
- Fiq Zone

=== Syria ===
- Fiq District
- Fiq, Syria, an abandoned Syrian town in the Golan Heights

== Other uses ==
- Fast interrupt request
- Fédération de l'informatique du Québec, the Information Technology Federation of Quebec
- Fédération Internationale des Quilleurs, now World Bowling
- Festival Internacional de Quadrinhos, a Brazilian comic convention
- FIQ Development Center, an Iranian financial services company
- Fiqh, Islamic jurisprudence
- Financial Intelligence Quotient

== See also ==
- Afek (disambiguation)
