= Ein Nymphit =

Coordinates: 32°51′50.65″N 35°6′21.74″E

Ein Nymphit (עין נמפית, lit. Nymphit Spring) is a small nature reserve northwest of Tel Afek, south of Kfar Masaryk, Israel.

== History ==
Ein Nymphit is named for a perennial spring that produces clean clear water. The water flows from the spring to Nahal Na'aman, filling some pools on the way. The spring is named for the Nymphaea caerulea that grows nearby.

The reserve is 62 dunams, declared in 1968. Cyperus, Longleaf Pondweed flowers grow on the reserve, in addition to Nymphaea caerulea

== See also ==
- Geography of Israel
- Wildlife of Israel
