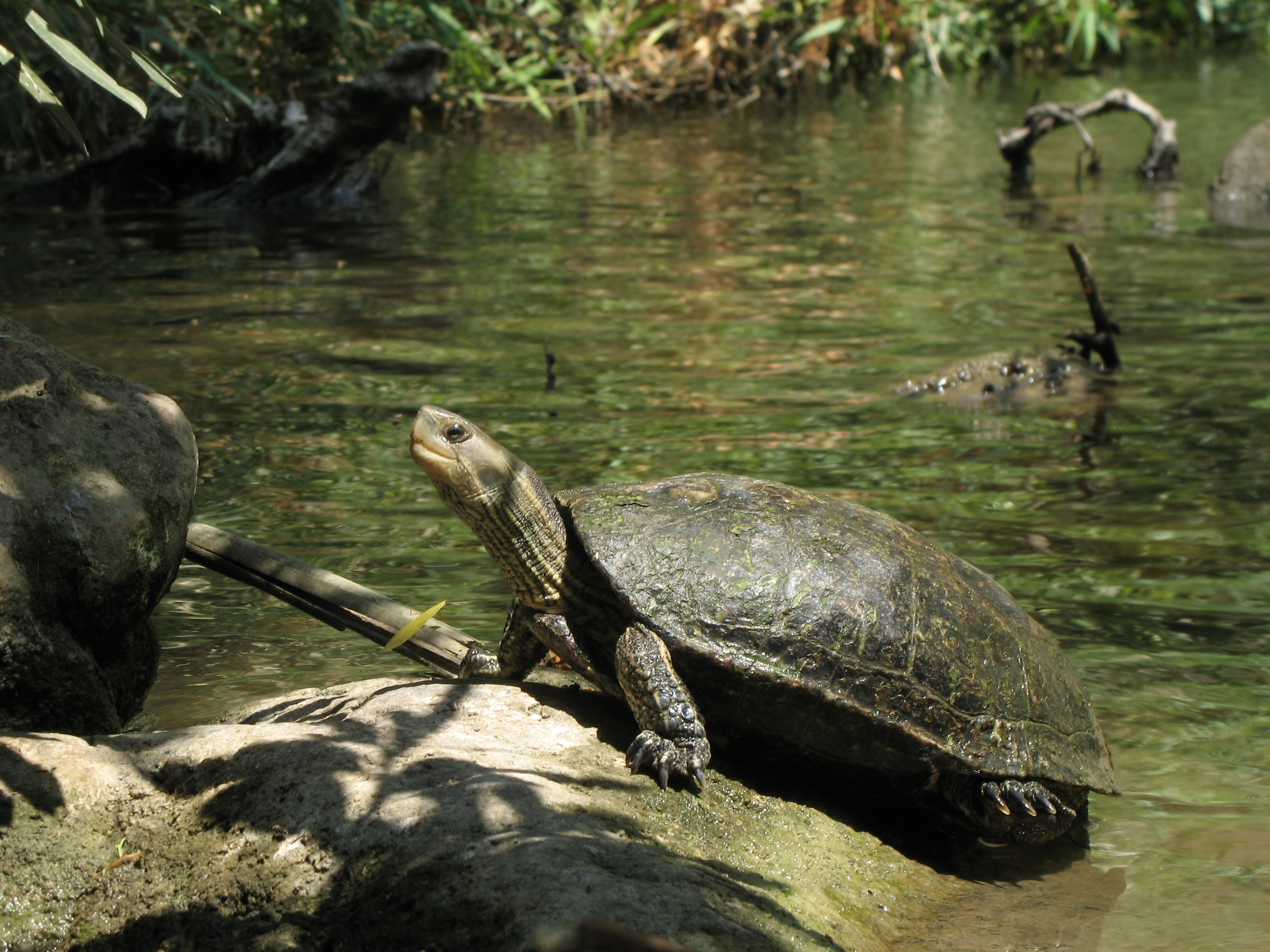
- Western Caspian turtle

Scientific classification
- Kingdom: Animalia
- Phylum: Chordata
- Class: Reptilia
- Order: Testudines
- Suborder: Cryptodira
- Family: Geoemydidae
- Genus: Mauremys
- Species: M. caspica

Binomial name
- Mauremys caspica (Gmelin, 1774)

Synonyms
- Mauremys caspica caspica: Testudo caspica Gmelin, 1774; Emys caspica — Schweigger, 1812; Clemmys caspica — Wagler, 1830; Emys caspia Rüppell, 1831 (ex errore); Testudo caspia — Gray, 1831; Terrapene caspica — Bonaparte, 1832; Clemmys [caspica] caspica — Siebenrock, 1909; Mauremys caspica — McDowell, 1964; Mauremys caspica caspica — Pritchard, 1966; Mauremys caspica siebenrocki: Emys grayi Günther, 1869; Emmenia grayi — Gray, 1870; Mauremys caspica siebenrocki Wischuf, 1996 (nomen nudum); Mauremys caspica siebenrocki Wischuf & Fritz, 1997; Mauremys caspica siebenrockii Bour, 2002 (ex errore); Mauremys caspica ventrimaculata: Mauremys caspica ventrimaculata Wischuf & Fritz, 1996; Mauremys caspica schiras Wischuf, 1996 (nomen nudum); Mauremys caspica ventriculata Obst, 2003 (ex errore)

= Caspian turtle =

Species of turtle

The Caspian turtle (Mauremys caspica), also known as the striped-neck terrapin, is a species of turtle in the family Geoemydidae (=Bataguridae). It is found in west Asia, in Iran and central Turkey, northward to the Republic of Georgia, Azerbaijan, Russia (Dagestan), eastward to southwestern Turkmenistan, and in Iraq, Saudi Arabia, and Bahrain.

== Description ==
Mauremys caspica is a tan to blackish, medium-sized, semiaquatic turtle, which may attain a carapace length of 25 cm (9.8 in). Its low, oval carapace has a slight medial keel (better developed in juveniles) and a smooth, unserrated marginal border, which is slightly upturned and tapered above the tail. A pair of low lateral keels are present on the pleural scutes of hatchlings, but these become lower with age and disappear completely in adults. The carapace is tan to olive or black with yellow to cream-colored reticulations patterning the scutes, and some individuals have yellow vertebral stripes. These light lines fade with age, but the pleural seam borders become darker. The well-developed plastron is notched posteriorly. The plastral formulae are given in the subspecies descriptions under Geographic Variation. The plastron is either yellow with variable reddish to dark-brown blotches, or dark brown or black with a yellow blotch along the lateral scute borders. The bridge is either yellow with dark seam borders and dark spots on the corresponding marginals, or almost totally black with a few small yellow marks. The head is not enlarged, and is olive to dark brown with yellow or pale cream-colored stripes. Some stripes extend anteriorly from the neck onto the head. One of these on each side passes above the eye and onto the snout where it meets the stripe from the other side. Several others extend across the tympanum to contact the posterior rim of the orbit, and two additional stripes continue across the snout and pass ventral to the orbit. The neck, limbs, and tail are tan gray to olive or black with yellow, cream, or gray stripes or reticulations. M. caspica has 52 chromosomes; (Killebrew, 1977a; Bickham and Carr, 1983). Females are generally larger than males, have flat plastra and shorter tails with the vent under the rim of the carapace. The smaller males have concave plastra and longer, thicker tails with a vent beyond the rim of the carapace.

== Systematics ==
Three subspecies are recognized: The eastern Caspian turtle, Siebenrock's Caspian turtle, and the spotted-bellied Caspian turtle. The western Caspian turtle was formerly treated as a subspecies but is now recognized as its own species.

The eastern Caspian turtle (Mauremys caspica caspica) was recently split into three forms. The nominate subspecies occurs in central Turkey and northern Iran, northward to the Republic of Georgia and eastward to southwestern Turkmenistan. It has wider reticulations on its carapace than M. c. rivulata, and a yellow-to-tan plastron with a regularly shaped, large, dark blotch on each scute. These more-or-less symmetrically arranged plastral spots may merge to one dark central spot, but a yellow border to the plastron often remains. The soft parts are mainly dark, and the bridge is mainly yellow with some dark lines or spots (but may be dark in old melanistic individuals). Its plastral formula is fem > abd > pect > gul > hum > an for males, and abd > fem > pect > gul > hum > an for females.

Siebenrock's Caspian turtle (M. c. siebenrocki ) occurs in Iran and Iraq, with relict populations in Saudi Arabia and on the island of Bahrain; it intergrades with M. c. caspica in Mesopotamia. This light form with contrasting colors resembles M. c. caspica, but has a yellow-to-orange plastron with a small to medium-sized, regularly shaped dark blotch on each scute. The soft parts are lighter than in M. c. caspica, and, unlike in other subspecies, age-related melanism does not occur in this subspecies.

The spotted-bellied Caspian turtle (M. c. ventrimaculata) is endemic to the highlands of the Kor and Maharloo basins in southern Iran. It is distinguished from the M. c. caspica and M. c. siebenrocki subspecies by a yellow plastron with one or several irregularly shaped black spots on each scute. In older individuals this results in a complex plastral pattern of irregular dark markings.

The western Caspian turtle, formerly M. c. rivulata and now recognized as its own species Mauremys rivulata, ranges throughout southeastern Europe (former Yugoslavia to Greece, the Ionian Islands, Crete, and Cyprus), Bulgaria, eastern to south-central Turkey, coastal Syria, Lebanon, and Israel; records from the vicinity of Ankara and from Lake Emir are questioned by Fritz. This species has narrow or fine reticulations on its carapace (which may be lost with age), and a totally black plastron and bridge. Age-related flavism may occur, resulting in a mainly yellow plastron with black reduced to the seams. This species can be separated from melanistic M. c. caspica by differences in head, neck, and foreleg patterns. Its plastral formula usually is abd > fem > pect > gul > an > hum in both sexes, but variations of this have been described in İzmir populations.

According to Fritz and Wischuf, M. c. caspica sensu lato (caspica, siebenrocki and ventrimaculata) and M. c. rivulata only intergrade in two populations near the Turkish-Syrian border; no wide intergradation belt between these two forms exists. Therefore, they proposed that rivulata be separated as a "monotypic semi-species". Rivulata and members of the main caspica group are known to produce (presumably fertile) hybrids, so they should never be housed together in captivity

The Spanish pond turtle (Mauremys leprosa) was formerly considered a subspecies of M. caspica, but studies of the electrophoretic properties of its proteins, and studies of its morphology have shown it to be a separate species.

== Etymology ==
The subspecific name, siebenrocki, is in honor of Austrian herpetologist Friedrich Siebenrock.

== Ecology ==
Mauremys caspica occurs in large numbers in almost any permanent freshwater body within its range. It also lives in irrigation canals and is quite tolerant of brackish water. The turtles at one Iraq site lacked the ability to swim. Instead, they would crawl out of the water periodically to breathe and then slide back in again. A captive from there could not be induced to swim. Reed thought this behavior to be an adaptation to the extreme variability in the supply of surface water in the area.

Breeding usually takes place in early spring, but may also occur in the fall. The courtship behavior has not been described, but must be similar to that in captivity. Nesting occurs in June and July. A typical clutch is four to six, elongated 20–30 x 35–40 mm (1.0 x 1.5 in), brittle-shelled, white eggs. Hatchlings have round carapaces about 33 mm (1.3 in) in length, and are brighter colored than the adults. The Caspian turtle may occur in large populations in certain areas, especially in permanent water bodies. In temporary waters, it is forced to aestivate in the mud in summer, and the more northern populations hibernate during winter. It often basks, but disappears at the least disturbance. Many are killed each year by humans who obtain their eggs to use in treating ubiquitous eye ailments. Storks and vultures also take a heavy toll of juveniles and adults, respectively. It is carnivorous as juveniles with a shift towards being omnivorous as adults; larger individuals were observed to be more herbivorous. It feeds on small invertebrates, aquatic insects, amphibians, carrion, as well as a variety of aquatic and terrestrial plants.
