= Revital Sharon =

Israeli artistic gymnast

- רויטל שרון
- Born: December 2, 1970 (age 55) Kiryat Bialik, Israel

Gymnastics career
- Discipline: Women's artistic gymnastics
- Country represented: Israel
- Club: Hapoel Kiryat Bialik
- Head coach: Zahava Zissman

Revital Sharon (Hebrew: רויטל שרון; born December 2, 1970) is an Israeli former Olympic artistic gymnast. At the age of 11, in 1982 Sharon won a gold medal at the International Workers’ Games in Italy. In 1988, Sharon was Israel's National Women's all-around champion, and was named Israel's 1988 Sportswoman of the Year.

She was born in Kiryat Bialik, Israel, and is Jewish.

== Gymnastics career ==
Sharon competed for Hapoel Kiryat Bialik. She was coached by Israeli national team coach Zahava Zissman.

At the age of 11, in 1982 Sharon won a gold medal at the International Workers’ Games in Italy. At the age of 14, she finished 120th at the 1985 World Artistic Gymnastics Championships, in Montreal, Canada.

In 1987, Sharon competed at the 1987 World Artistic Gymnastics Championships in Rotterdam in the Netherlands and finished in 92nd place out of 201 gymnasts in the all-around competition. Asked about boyfriends, she told Danny Ben-Tal of The Jerusalem Post: "They'll have to wait a year or two; the Olympics won't."

Sharon competed for Israel at the 1988 Summer Olympics in Seoul, South Korea, at the age of 17 in Gymnastics. In Women's Individual All-Around she came in 77th, in Women's Floor Exercise she came in 61st, in Women's Horse Vault she came in 48th, in Women's Uneven Bars she came in 81st, and in Women's Balance Beam she came in 78th. When she competed in the Olympics, she was 5 ft 4.5 in (164 cm) tall and weighed 108 lb (49 kg).

That same year Sharon was Israel's National Women's all-around champion. She was named Israel's 1988 Sportswoman of the Year.
