= Avraham Givelber =

Israeli politician (1910–2002)

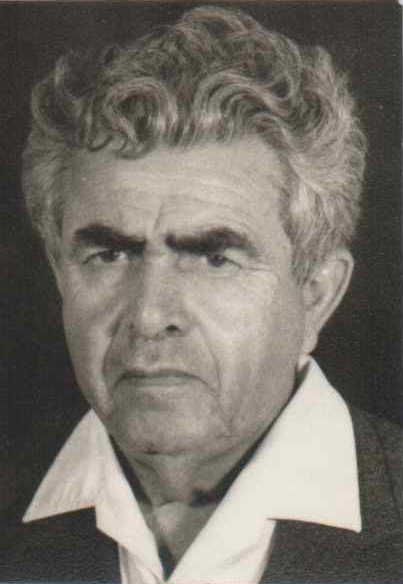
- Givelber in the 1970s

Faction represented in the Knesset
- 1974–1977: Alignment

Personal details
- Born: 23 March 1910
- Died: 2 August 2002 (aged 92)

Avraham Givelber (Hebrew: אברהם גיבלבר; 23 March 1910 – 2 August 2002) was an Israeli politician who served as a member of the Knesset for the Alignment between 1974 and 1977.

== Biography ==
Born in what was to become Poland in 1910, Givelber was a member of the HeHalutz movement, serving as secretary of the Polish branch between 1937 and 1940. In 1941 he emigrated to Mandatory Palestine, where he joined kibbutz Afek.

A member of Ahdut HaAvoda - Poale Zion, he served as the party's secretary from 1959 until 1963 and again from 1966 until 1967. He became a member of the Labor Party when Ahdut HaAvoda merged into it in 1968. In 1973 he was elected to the Knesset on the Alignment list, an alliance of the Labor Party and Mapam. He was appointed Deputy Speaker and sat on the Committee for Public Services and the Internal Affairs and Environment Committee, but lost his seat in the 1977 elections.

Givelber was also a member of the presidium of the World Federation of Polish Jews, chairman of the management committee of the Ghetto Fighters' House and the Holocaust and Rebellion Museum, as well as being a member of the Yad Vashem Council.

He died in 2002 at the age of 92.
