= Afek, Israel =

Kibbutz in northern Israel

Afek: אֲפֵק (Hebrew)
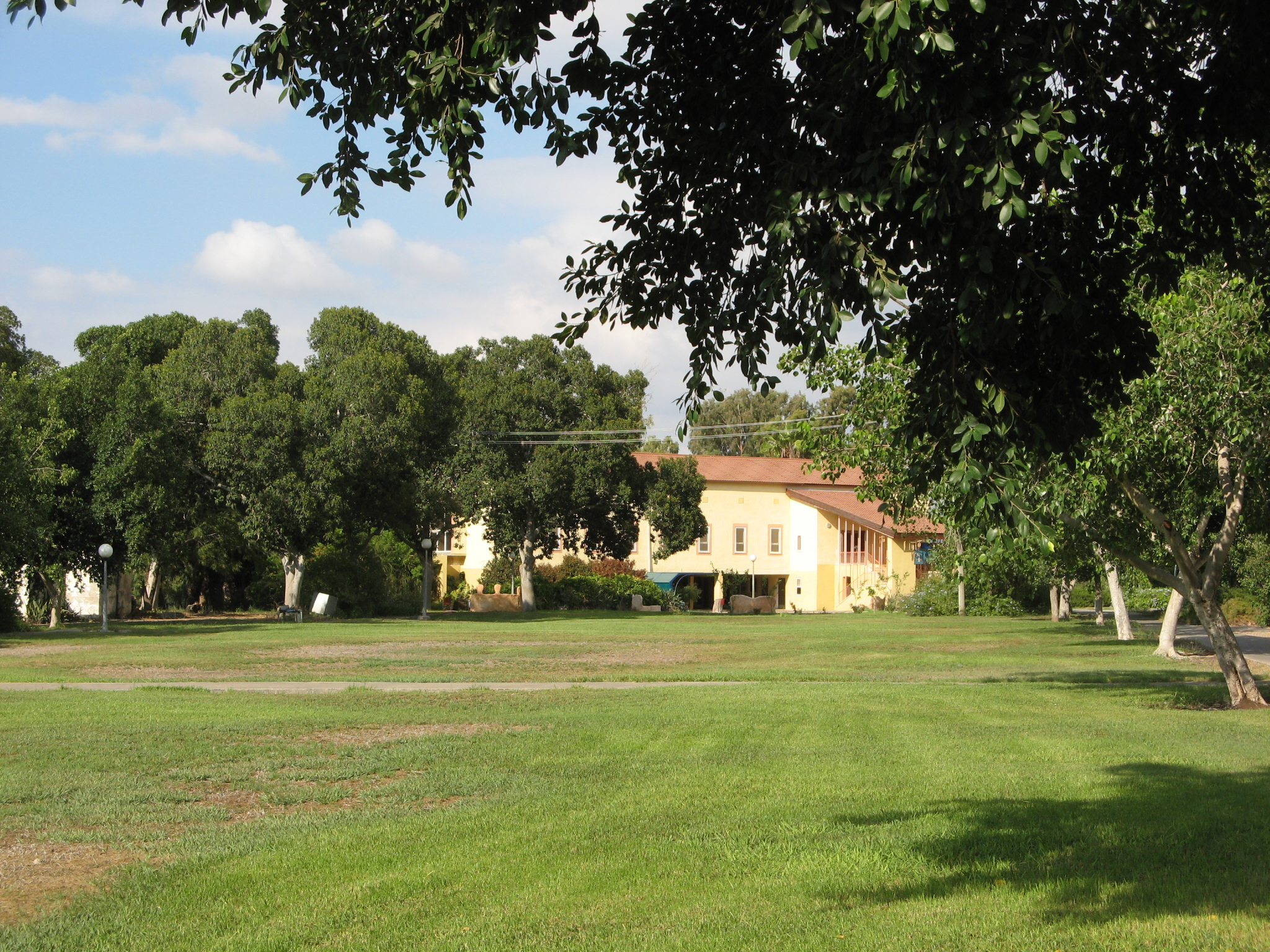

- Location within Northwest Israel Location within Israel
- Coordinates: 32°50′19.67″N 35°7′40.8″E
- Country: Israel
- District: Northern
- Subdistrict: Acre
- Council: Mateh Asher
- Region: Zevulun Valley
- Affiliation: Kibbutz Movement
- Founded: 1935 (as Plugot HaYam); 1938 (as Mishmar HaYam); 1947 (current location)
- Founder: United Kibbutz Movement Members
- Population (2024): 751

Afek (Hebrew: אֲפֵק) is a kibbutz in northern Israel. Located in the Zevulun Valley in the Western Galilee, near the archaeological site of Tel Afek and the HaKerayot agglomeration, it falls under the jurisdiction of the Mateh Asher Regional Council. In 2024 it had a population of 751.

== History ==
The kibbutz was founded in 1935 as Plugat HaYam (Hebrew: פלוגת הים, lit. Sea Company) on the dunes near present-day Kiryat Haim, with the goal of getting jobs in the Port of Haifa. In 1938 the kibbutz was moved to the coast in the area of Acre as a "tower and stockade" settlement, and was renamed Mishmar HaYam (Hebrew: משמר הים, lit. Sea Guard). In 1947 the village moved again to its current location, this time a short distance inland on the same agricultural lands, based on the decision to abandon fishing and concentrate exclusively on agriculture. Its current name is derived from the adjacent Tel Afek, a candidate for one of the biblical Apheks (Joshua 19:30).

Afek has 200 members and over 450 residents. The kibbutz operates a preschool and primary school that are open to the public. The kibbutz economy is based on crops, orchards, dairy farming, poultry farming, and fish farming. It also has three factories: Asiv produces fabrics, Mego medical supplies, and Hinnanit dolls and clothing accessories. Hinnanit also exhibits and sells rugs made from the fabric produced on the kibbutz.

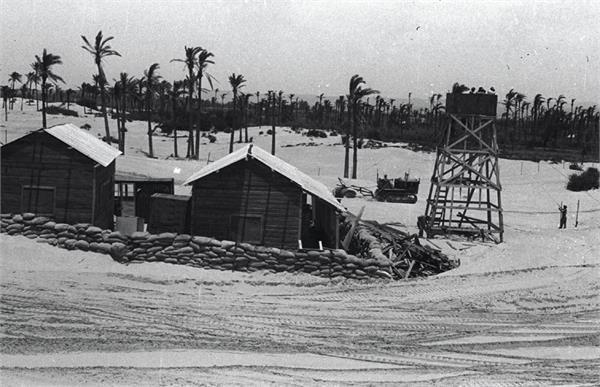
Kibbutz Afek, 2nd location, 1939

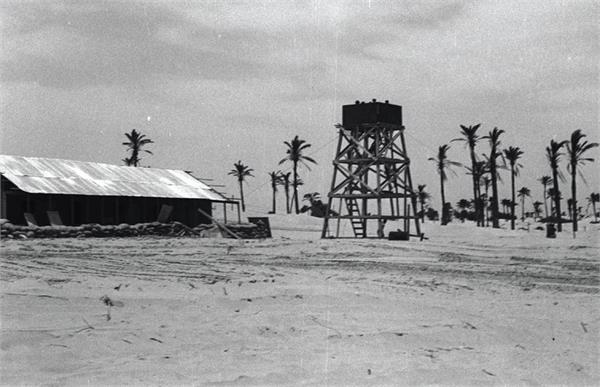
Afek 1939

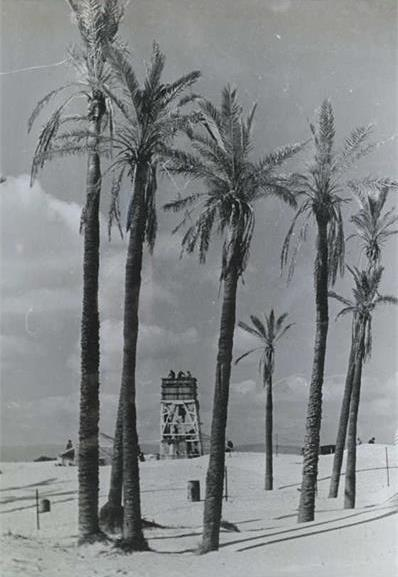
Afek, 1939

== Notable people ==
- Avraham Givelber
