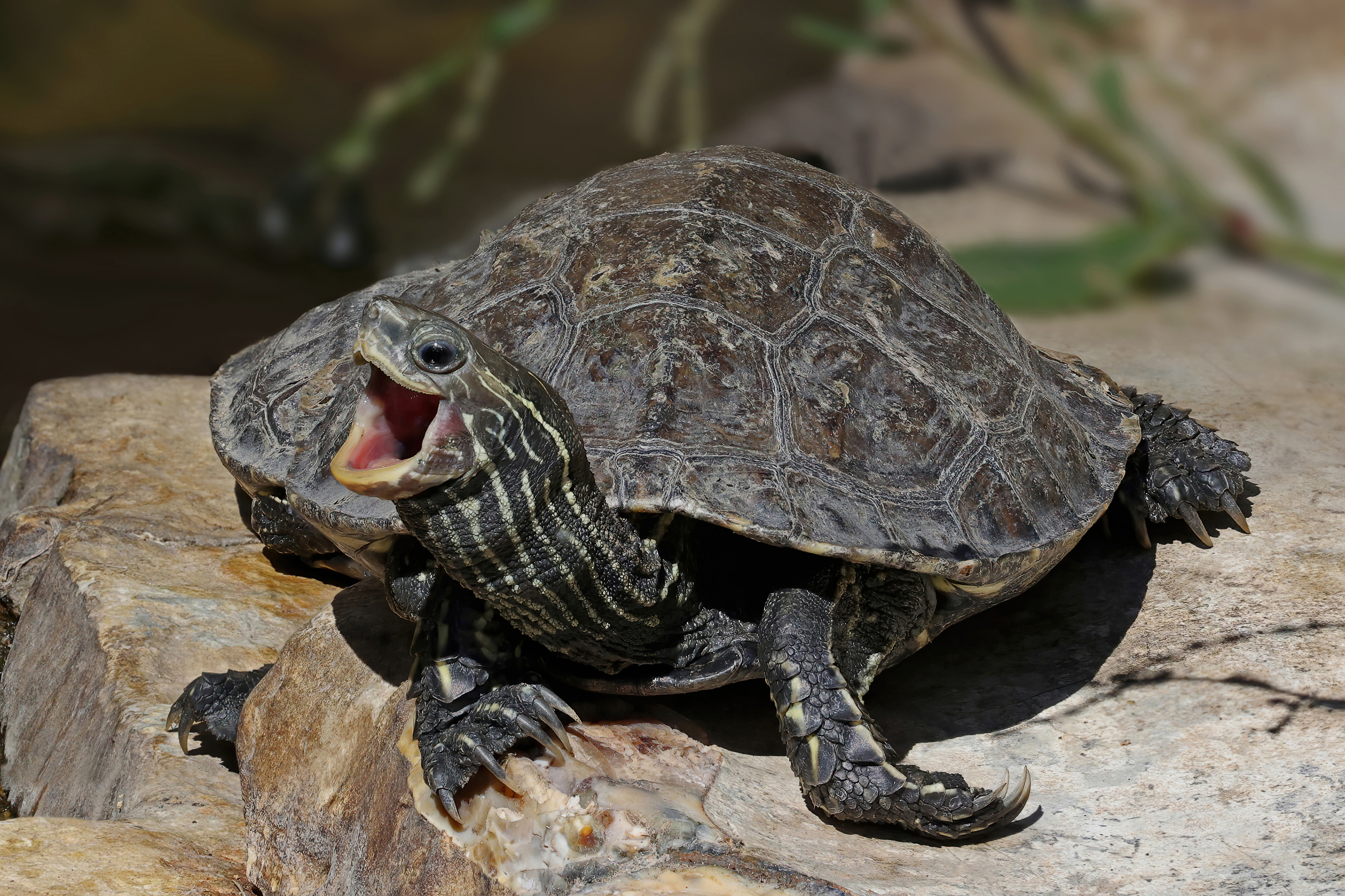
- Butrint, Albania

Conservation status
- Least Concern (IUCN 3.1)

Scientific classification
- Kingdom: Animalia
- Phylum: Chordata
- Class: Reptilia
- Order: Testudines
- Suborder: Cryptodira
- Family: Geoemydidae
- Genus: Mauremys
- Species: M. rivulata

Binomial name
- Mauremys rivulata (Valenciennes, 1833)

Synonyms
- List: Emys rivulata Valenciennes, 1833; Emys tristrami Gray, 1869; Emys caspica var. arabica Gray, 1870; Emys pannonica Gray, 1870; Emys tristram Gray, 1873 (ex errore); Emys arabica Gray, 1873; Clemmys caspica orientalis Bedriaga, 1881; Clemmys caspica var. rivulata Boulenger, 1889; Clemmys caspica var. obsoleta Schreiber, 1912; Clemmys caspica cretica Mertens, 1946; Mauremys caspica rivulata Młynarski, 1969; Mauremys rivulata Bour, 1994; Mauremys rivulata rivulata Maran, 1996; Mauremys rivulata tristrami Maran, 1996; Mauremys caspica cretica Bonin, Devaux & Dupré, 1996; Emmenia rivulata Vetter, 2006; Mauremys rivulata cretica Bonin, Devaux & Dupré, 2006

= Balkan terrapin =

Species of turtle

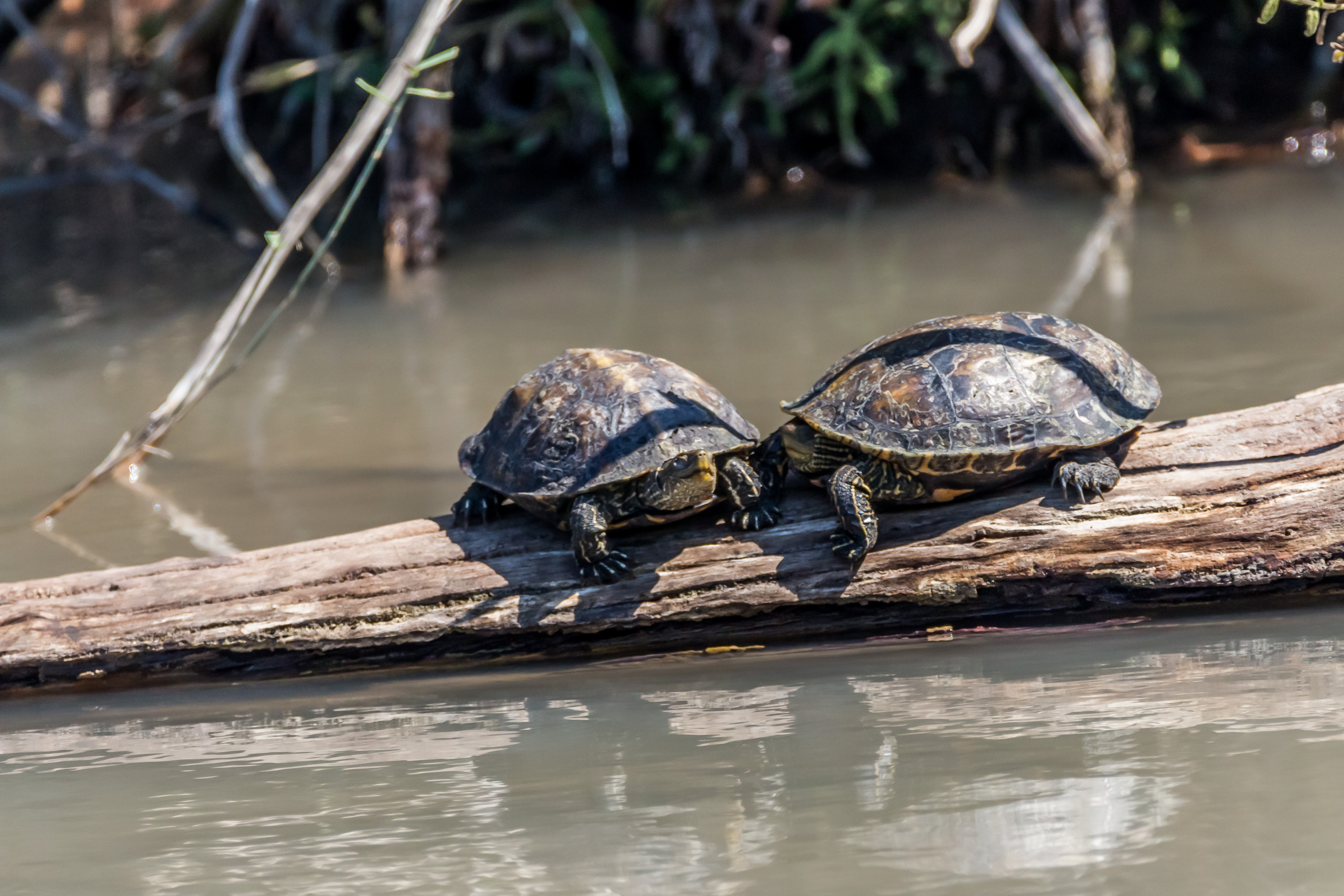
Turtles at the Ein Afek Nature Reserve

The Balkan terrapin or western Caspian turtle (Mauremys rivulata) is a species of terrapin in the family Geoemydidae. It is found in the eastern Mediterranean region. While technically omnivorous, the terrapins are known to prefer meat. They can grow to 25 cm (10 in) in carapace length, although hatchlings are usually only 3 to 4 cm (1.2 to 1.6 in) in length.

== Distribution ==
It is found in the Balkan Peninsula (Albania, Bosnia and Herzegovina, Bulgaria, Croatia, Greece, Montenegro, North Macedonia, Serbia), in a number of Mediterranean islands including Crete, Cyprus and Lesvos, and in the Middle East (Palestine, Israel (occupied Palestine), Jordan, Lebanon, Syria, Turkey). On some Greek and Turkish islands where the terrapins are found, they may be threatened with extirpation.

== Physical description ==
Mauremys rivulata are fairly large, with carapace lengths up to 25 cm (10 in); hatchling turtles of this species are usually between 3 and 4 centimetres (1.2 and 1.6 in) in length. The average straight carapace length (SCL) is roughly 15 cm (6 in); females are slightly larger. The terrapin's carapace can be black to olive green in colour, and the plastron (the shell on the belly) black, although the latter frequently fades as the terrapin ages. The species also has horizontal yellowish lines running along the neck and limbs.

== Habitat and ecology ==
The species is mostly lowland, although the terrapins have been recorded as far up as 900 metres (3,000 ft) above sea level. They are found in wetland habitats, including swamps, rivers, and ponds, although they lay their eggs in grassland regions.

Mauremys rivulata are preyed on by large birds and predacious mammals such as mongoose who also feed on the terrapins' eggs, although smaller carnivores may prey on younger turtles with softer shells.

== Diet ==
Mauremys rivulata is an omnivorous species, eating both plants and animals, although a preference for meat is documented. Young terrapins will eat small invertebrates as well as small amphibian larvae or carcasses; adult terrapins are known also to eat algae and aquatic plants.

== Interactions with humans ==
Human behaviour affecting the species' habitat has caused population decline. The largest effects come from urbanisation, water engineering projects, and industrial waste from construction.

In the northern portion of its range, the species may hibernate during the winter. Although the terrapins may accept bread offered by humans, they do not have the enzymes needed to digest it, and such offerings are thus bad for their health.
