= Ein Afek Nature Reserve =

Wetland nature reserve in Israel

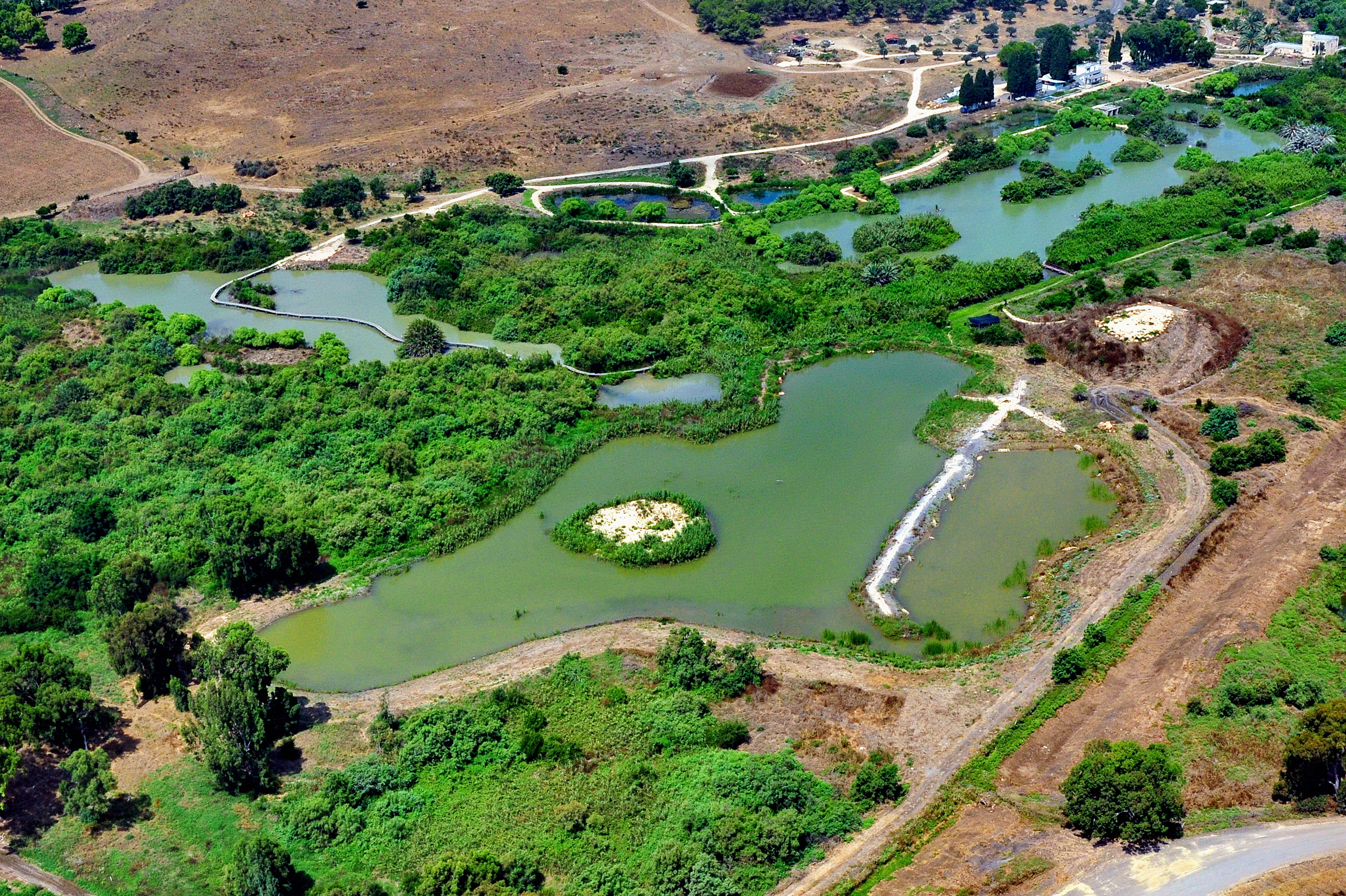
- Ein Afek Aerial photo

- Location within Israel
- Type: Nature reserve
- Location: Israel
- Nearest city: Kiryat Bialik
- Coordinates: 32.846072°N 35.111969°E

Ramsar Wetland
- Official name: En Afeq Nature Reserve
- Designated: 12 November 1996
- Reference no.: 867

The Ein Afek Nature Reserve (also En Afek, En Afeq, Ain Afek) is a nature reserve in the Acre Valley within the Zvulun Valley, Israel. It covers the swamps and springs at the source of the Na'aman River, as well as the Tel Afek archaeological site. The origin of the name is the biblical city of Afek.

The nature reserve, declared in 1979, covers 366 dunams. An additional 300 dunams were declared in 1994. The highlights of the park include the Crusader fortress and the natural water canals and lake, which draw their waters from the year-long flowing springs of Afek, which are the source of the Naaman river.

In 1996 it was recognized as a Ramsar site. It preserves the remnants of the vast swamps in the Acre Valley, drained and pumped out.

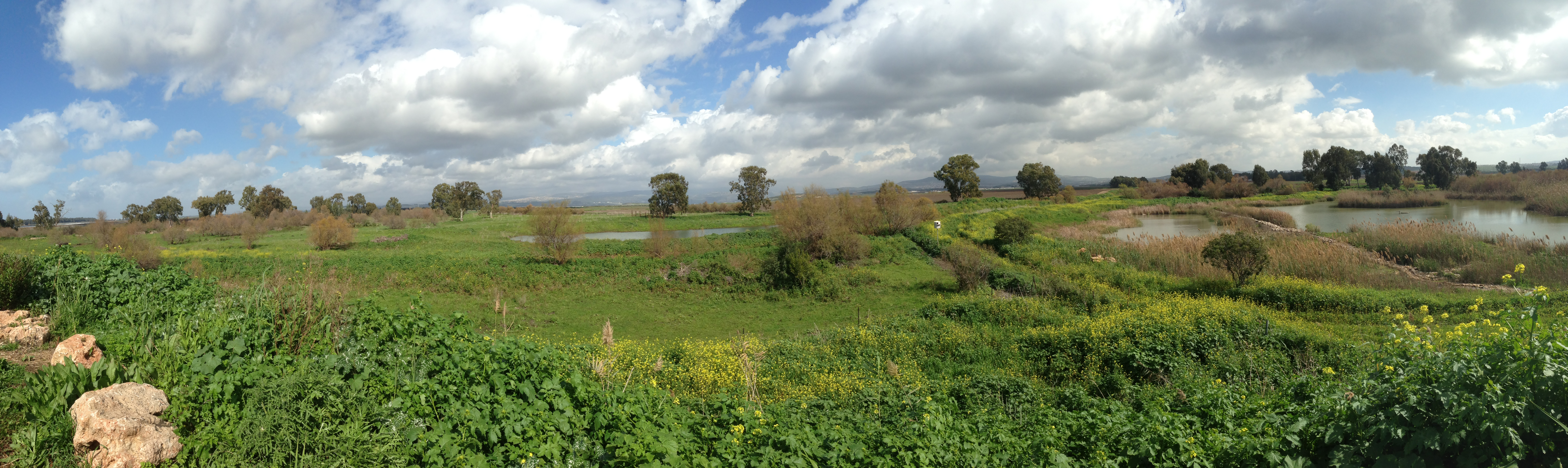
A panoramic view from Tel Afek
