= Kiryat Bialik =

Kiryat Bialik קִרְייַת בְּיַאלִיק
- City

Hebrew transcription(s)
  - ISO 259: Qiryat Byáˀliq (Bialik)
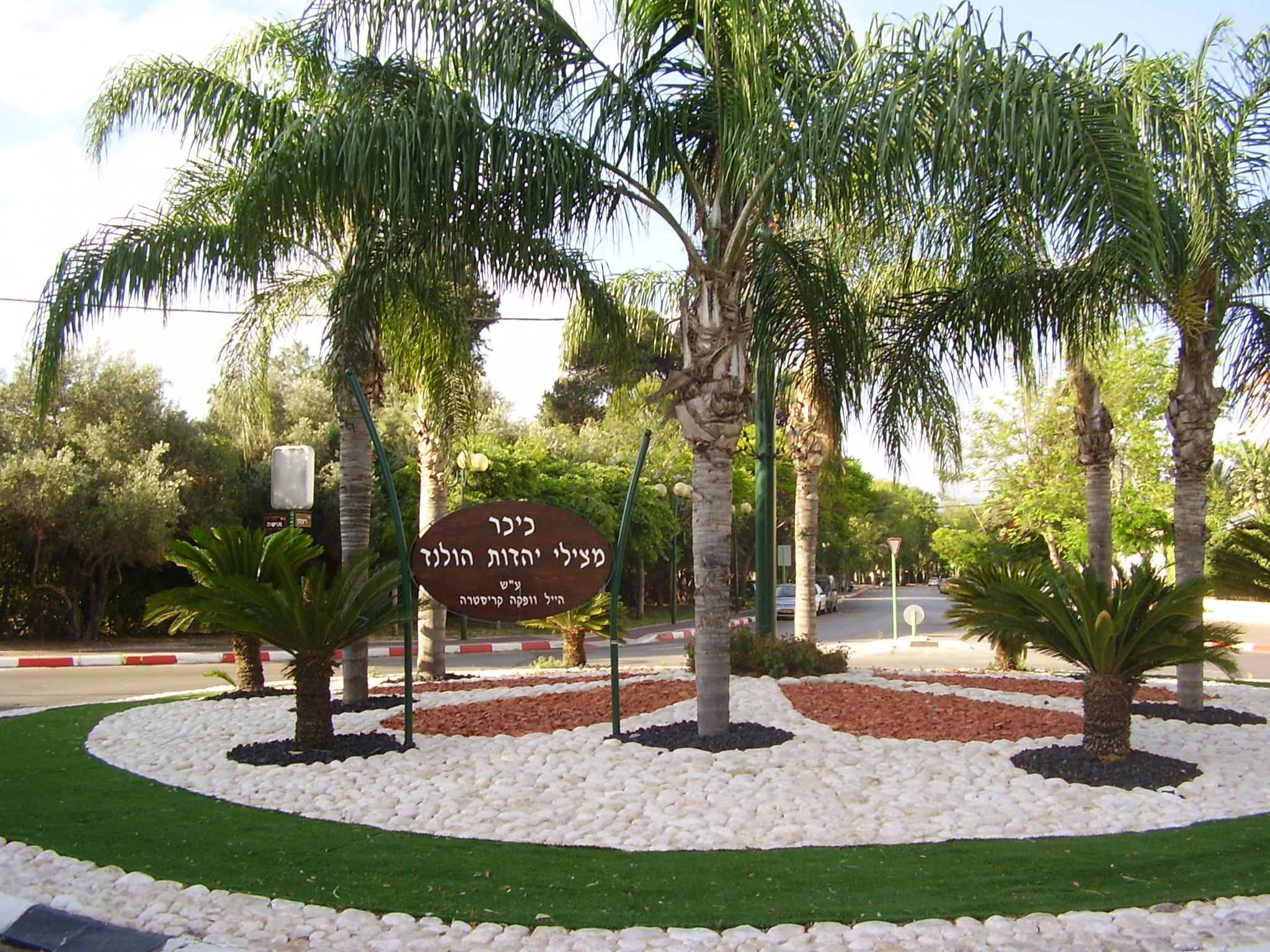
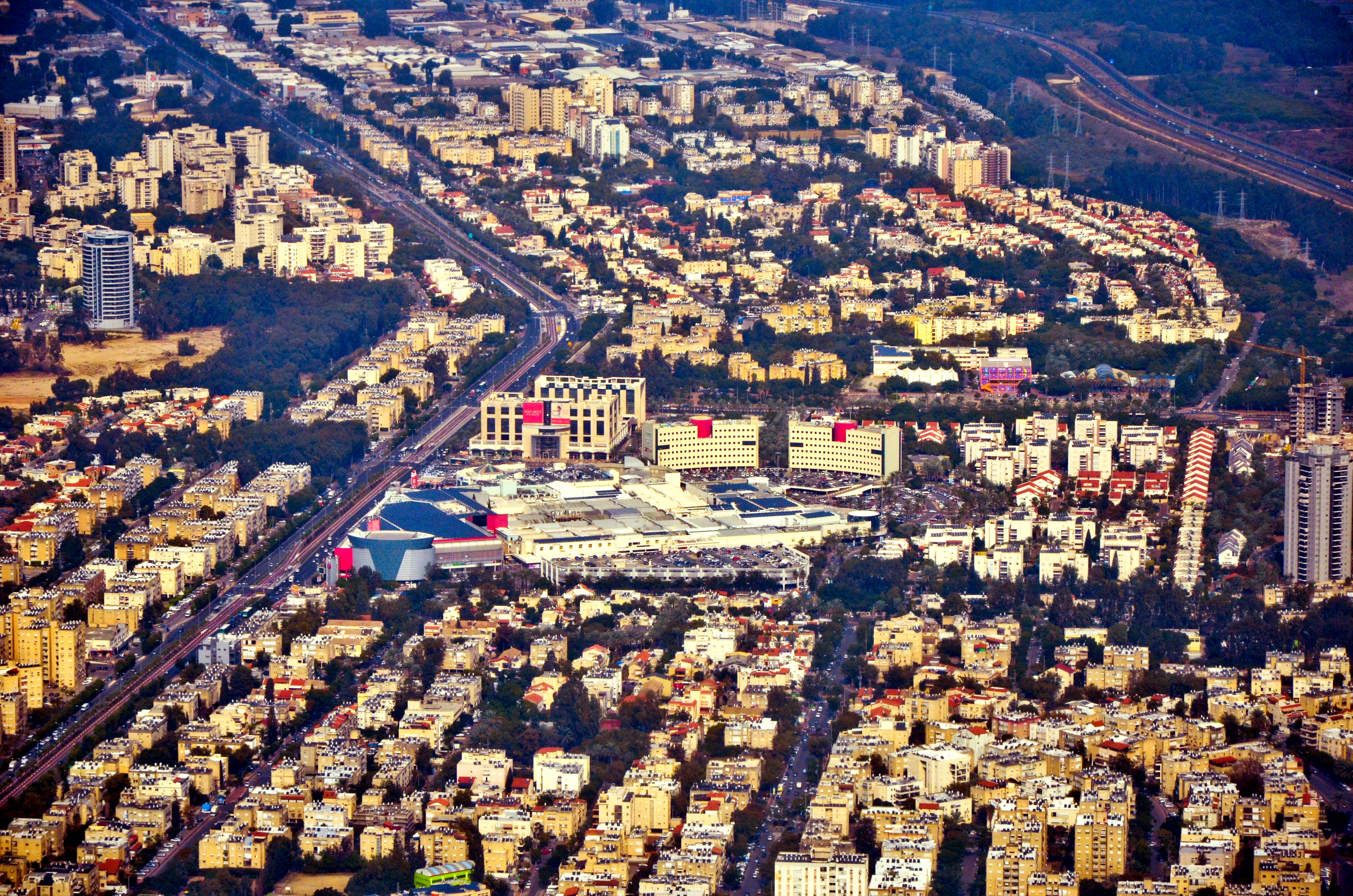
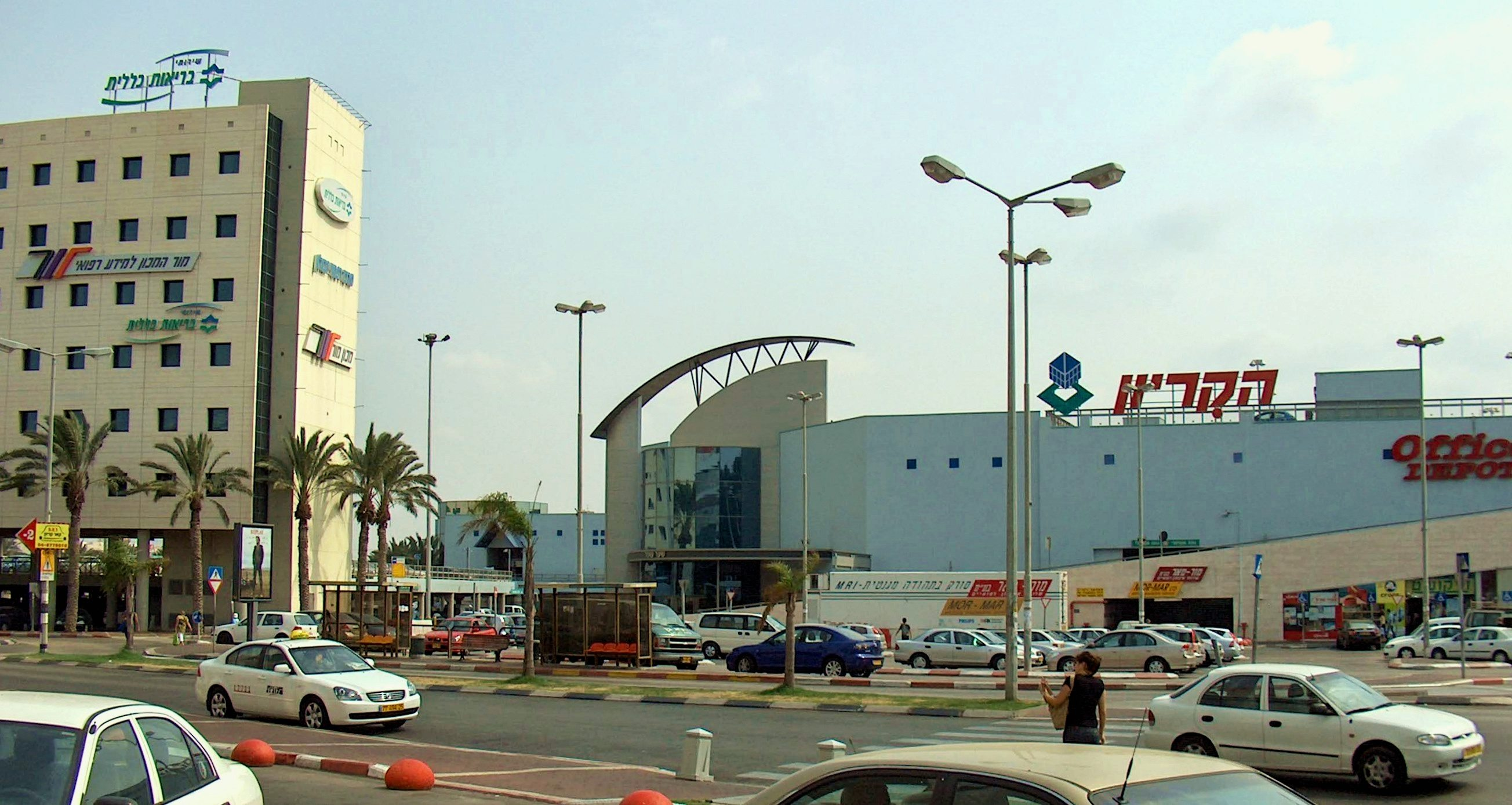
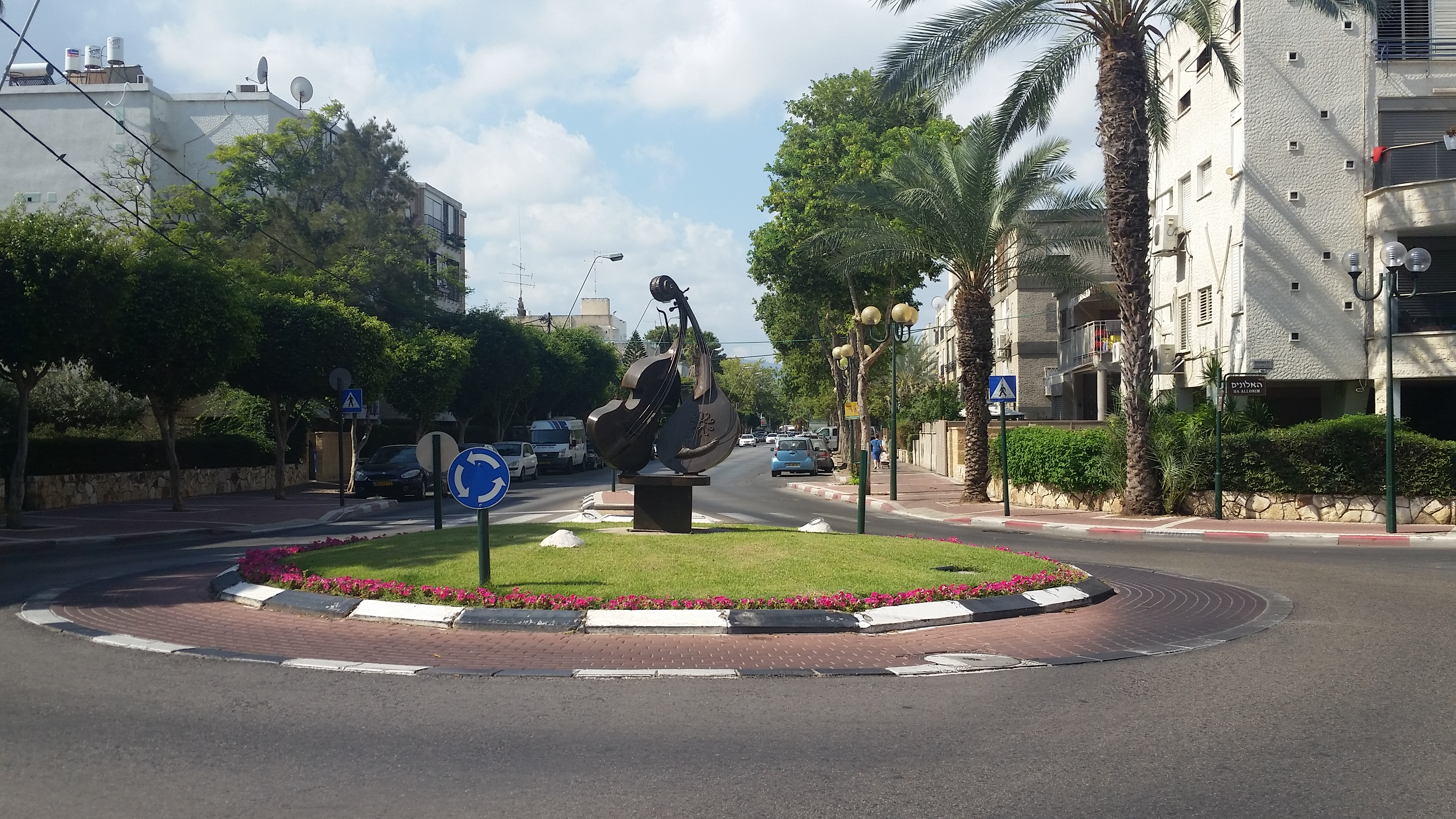
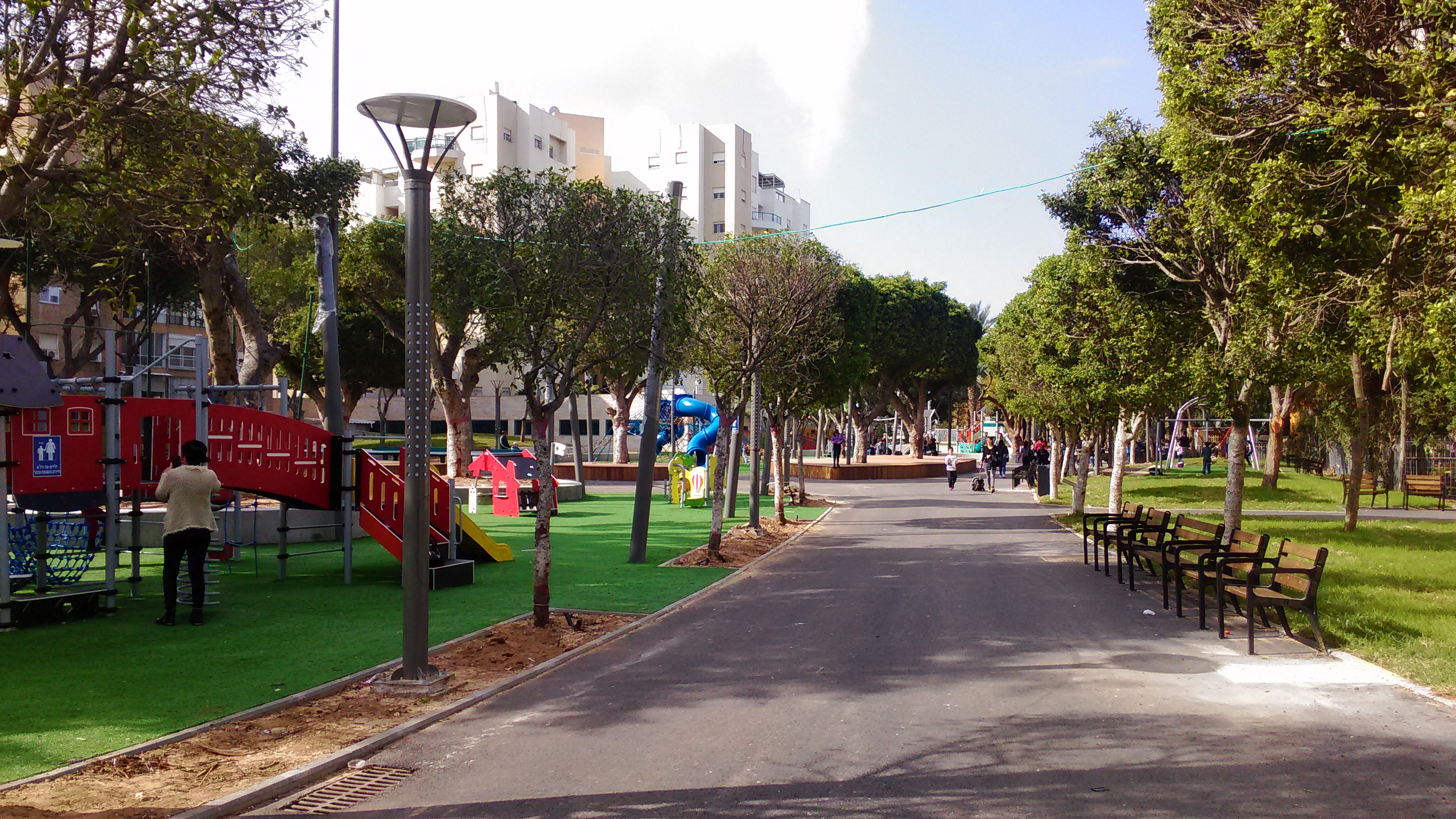

- Location within Haifa region of Israel Location within Israel
- Coordinates: 32°50′N 35°05′E
- Country: Israel
- District: Haifa
- Subdistrict: Haifa
- Founded: 1934

Government
  - Mayor: Eli Dukorsky

Area
  - Total: 8,178 dunams (8.178 km^{2}; 3.158 sq mi)

Population (2024)
  - Total: 47,073
  - Density: 5,756/km^{2} (14,910/sq mi)

Ethnicity
  - Jews and others: 99.8%
  - Arabs: 0.2%
- Name meaning: Bialik Town
- Website: www.qbialik.org.il

Kiryat Bialik (Hebrew: קִרְייַת בְּיַאלִיק, Arabic: كريات بياليك, also Qiryat Bialik) is a city in the Haifa District in Israel. The city was established on 18 July 1934, during the Fifth Aliyah. It is one of the five Krayot suburbs to the north of Haifa. In 2024 it had a population of 47,073.

The city was named after the poet Hayim Nahman Bialik.

== History ==
In 1924, Ephraim and Sabina Katz, who had immigrated to Mandatory Palestine from the Kingdom of Romania, were the first Jews in modern times to settle in the Zevulun Valley along the Haifa Bay. Their farm was destroyed in the 1929 Palestine riots. The one house that survived the riots, Beit Katz, was bequeathed to Kiryat Bialik in 1959 and designated for public use.

The town of Kiryat Bialik was founded in July 1934 by a group of German Jewish immigrants who had received a plot of land from the Jewish National Fund. The residents were mainly free professionals, doctors, engineers and lawyers who lived in private homes with gardens. During World War II, parts of Kiryat Bialik were bombed due to its proximity to the oil refineries in Haifa.

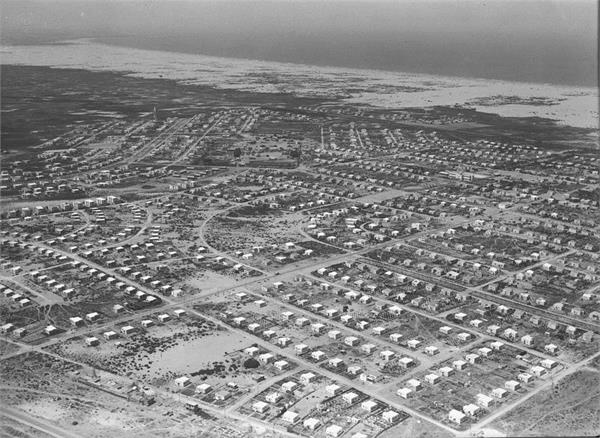
Kfar Bialik, 1939

In 1950, it was declared a local council, attaining city status in 1976.

In the early 1950s, the 'Ir HaMifratz' transit camp (also called 'Cordani A') was established, where among others, about 100 families of immigrants from India were absorbed. The transit camp was annexed to Kiryat Bialik in 1960.

During the Second Lebanon War, several rockets landed in the city, causing property damage and injuring a number of residents.

On 22 September 2024, during a fourth wave of rocket fire from Hezbollah, Kiryat Bialik was hit by rockets, injuring three people and damaging two houses. Magen David Adom (MDA) reported that two men, both in their 70s, and a 16-year-old girl were wounded by shrapnel. One of the men was in moderate condition, while the other two individuals sustained light injuries. All three were transported to Rambam Hospital in Haifa for treatment.

== Local government ==
=== Mayors ===
- Zvi Karliner (1945-1985);
- Danny Zack (1985-2003);
- Rafi Wertheim (2003-2008);
- Eli Dukorsky (2008-)

== Neighborhoods ==
- Bialik South – the southern neighborhood of Kiryat Bialik. In this neighborhood, Ort Kiryat Bialik Municipal High School was established, the largest school in Israel.
- Sabinia – named after Sabina Katz - was established in the 1930s. Sabinia Center is nowadays a shopping center.
- Tzur Shalom – the northern neighborhood in Kiryat Bialik. At the time of its establishment, it was inhabited mainly by immigrants. To the north of it is an extensive area of light industry.
- The Butterfly – a neighborhood established at the beginning of the 21st century. The neighborhood is named after its shape, the streets of the neighborhood and the buildings in it form the shape of a butterfly.
- Rakafot Hill – Firstly populated in 2005, and located in eastern part of the city, close by to Kiryat Ata. The name of the neighborhood translates to Primrose Hill in English.
- Neot Afek – a new neighborhood located in the east of Kiryat Bialik. It is near the Ein Afek Nature Reserve, Nahal Naaman and Tzur Shalom neighborhood.

== Demographics ==
Historical population
Year	Pop.	±%
1972	18,700	—
1983	30,900	+65.2%
1995	34,800	+12.6%
2008	37,200	+6.9%
2022	44,806	+20.4%
2024	47,072	+5.1%

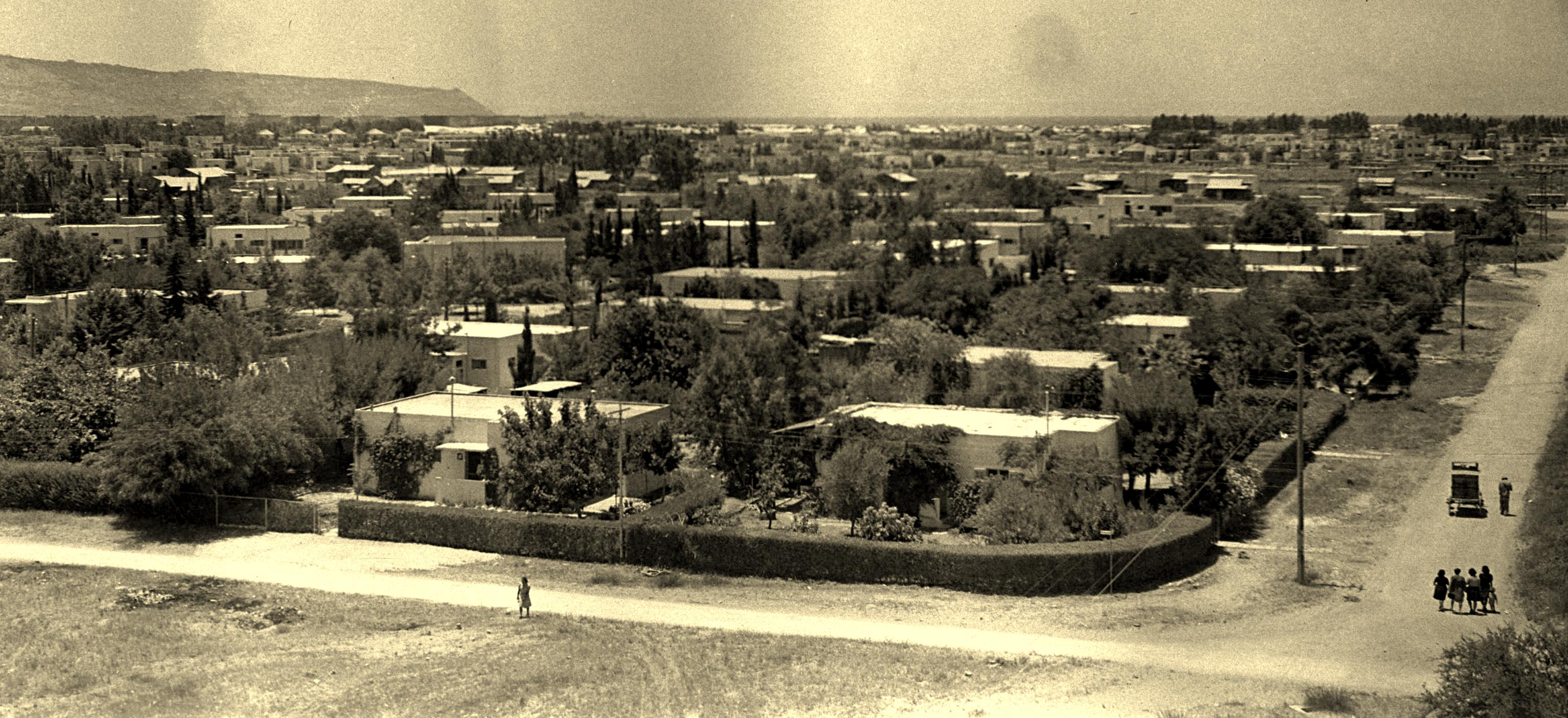
Kiryat Bialik in 1944

According to CBS, the ethnic makeup of Kiryat Bialik in 2008 was all Jewish, without a significant Arab population. There were 17,900 males and 19,200 females. In 2003 25.8% of the population was 19 years of age or younger, 15.8% between 20 and 29, 17.4% between 30 and 44, 21.5 from 45 to 59, 3.8% from 60 to 64, and 15.6% 65 years of age or older. The population growth rate in 2005 was -0.3%. The city is ranked medium-high on the socio-economic scale (7 out of 10). Many Jewish immigrants have settled in Kiryat Bialik from Ethiopia, the former Soviet Union and Argentina.

== Economy ==
According to CBS figures for 2002, there were 17,514 salaried workers and 912 self-employed in Kiryat Bialik. The mean monthly wage for a salaried worker was 6,119 NIS; salaried males had a mean monthly wage of 7,851 NIS versus 4,491 NIS for females. The mean income for the self-employed was 5,996 NIS. 557 people received unemployment benefits and 2,701 people received a guaranteed minimum income.

The town was known for the Ata textile factory, established in 1934 by Erich Moller.

The Ata plant, which opened in 1934, became an icon of the Israeli textile industry. It suffered from financial problems in the 1960s and closed down in 1985.

== Education ==
According to CBS, there are 9 schools and 6,291 students in the city: 6 elementary schools with 2,540 students, and 3 secondary education schools (2 junior high and 1 high school, under the same administration) with 3,751 students. 63.4% of 12th grade students were entitled to a Bagrut (matriculation) certificate in 2002.

== Second Lebanon War (2006) ==
During the Second Lebanon War in 2006, the city suffered hits from 15 Katyushas and other types of rockets sent by Hezbollah.

== Entertainment ==
In the city, there is a municipal library with two branches, one in the Tzur Shalom area and one in the old Bialik area. The city has two "Pisgah Center", where various classes for children and teenagers, events, and performances are held.

The "Afek Country Club" in the city features swimming pools and gyms. In 2019, the Yagur swimming pool was closed after 58 years of operation.

Every year in May, the city hosts the "Bialik Festival for Literature and Poetry," which includes cultural performances, meetings with authors, concerts, and children's plays.

Three youth movements operate in Kiryat Bialik: Scouts, HaNoar HaOved VeHaLomed, and HaMahanot HaOlim.

Kiryat Bialik operates a conservatory for music studies and voice development and also has the "Young Bialik" youth band, which performs in Israel and abroad.

The city has a museum dedicated to the history of the city, located in Beit Katz, known as Museum of the History of Kiryat Bialik.

Additionally, within the city is the Kiryon Shopping Mall, one of the largest shopping malls in the country and the largest in the north.

The city has a promenade named after Shimon Peres along the Gedora stream, stretching over several kilometers, starting from Rabin Square in the north to HaEmekim Street in the south of the city. Additionally, there are several parks throughout the city, including: Savyon Garden, which once housed the Savyon Cinema, Miriam Garden, Esther Park, HaBanim Park in the Afek neighborhood, and a park named after Ariel Sharon in the Tzur Shalom neighborhood.

== Voting patterns ==
In the 2022 election, 51 percent of voters in Kiryat Bialik voted for the parties of the center-left coalition led by Yair Lapid, while 47 percent voted for the parties of the right-wing coalition led by Benjamin Netanyahu and 0.1 percent voted for the Arab parties.

In the 2026 election, 51 percent of voters in Kiryat Bialik voted for the parties of the center-left coalition led by Gadi Eisenkot, while 42 percent voted for the parties of the right-wing coalition led by Benjamin Netanyahu and 0.2 percent voted for the Arab parties. An additional 4.2 percent voted for the Reservists, and 1.8 percent voted for Amcha Yisrael. Voter turnout increased 20 percent from the 2022 election.

== Notable people ==
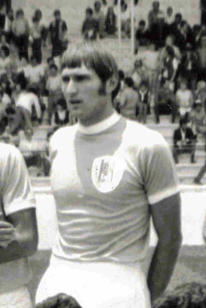
Yochanan Vollach

- Netanel Artzi (born 1997), Israeli basketball player
- Ronen Bergman (born 1972), investigative journalist and author
- Shani Bloch (born 1979), Olympic racing cyclist
- Anastasia Gorbenko (born 2003), swimmer
- Aviv Kochavi (born 1964), Israel Defense Forces Chief of Staff
- Ofri Lankri (born 1991), former tennis player and current wheelchair tennis coach
- Amnon Pazy (1936–2006), mathematician; President of the Hebrew University of Jerusalem
- Revital Sharon (born 1970), Olympic artistic gymnast
- Moti Taka (born 1997), singer
- Zehava Vardi, Miss Israel 1977
- Yochanan Vollach (born 1945), association football player

== Twin towns – sister cities ==
Kiryat Bialik is twinned with:

- Hlybokaye, Belarus
- İsmayıllı, Azerbaijan
- Radomsko, Poland
- Rosh HaAyin, Israel
- Steglitz-Zehlendorf (Berlin), Germany
- Chemnitz, Germany
- Zakynthos, Greece
- (Georgia (country)) Zestaponi, Georgia

== Gallery ==
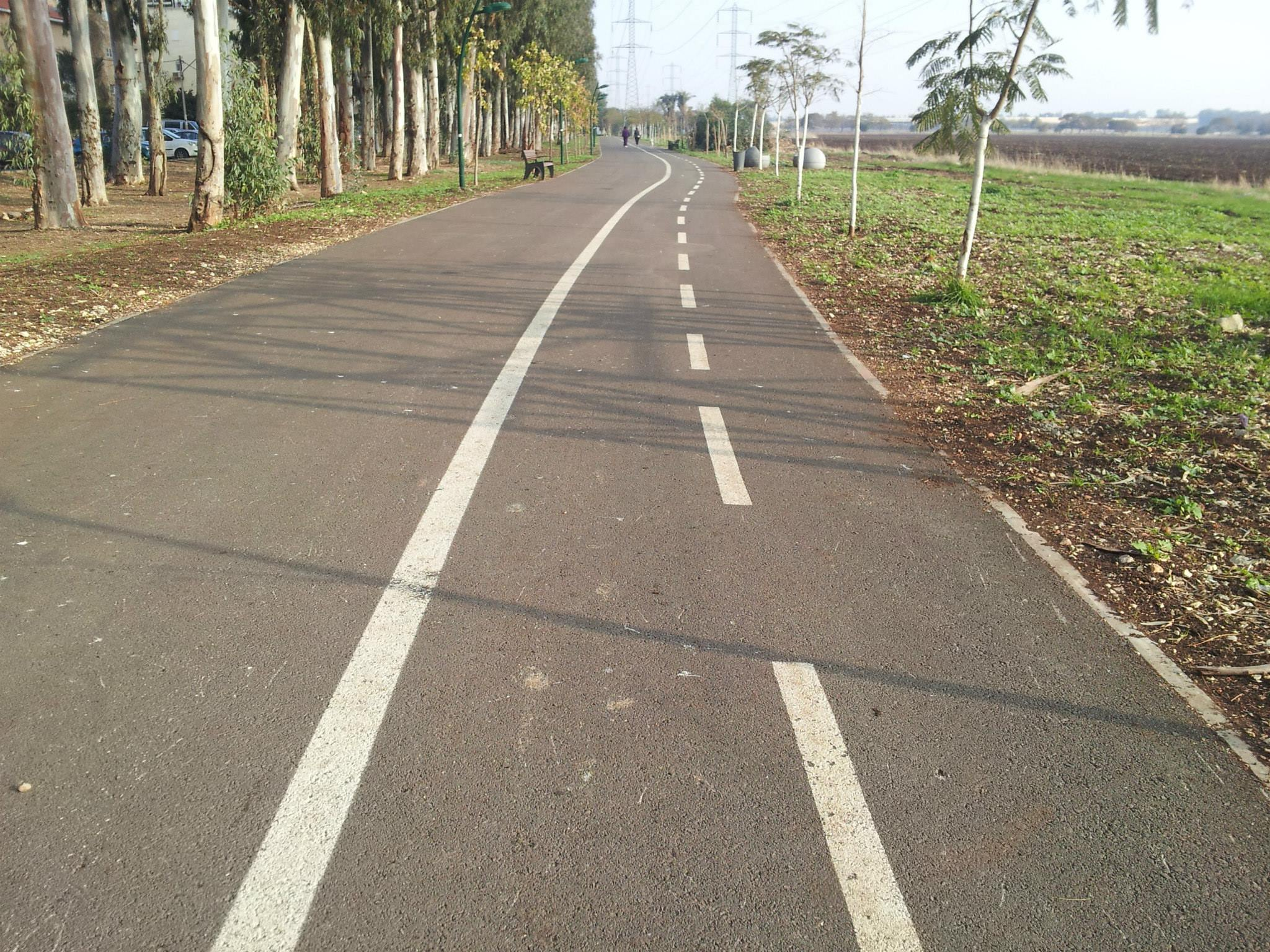
The promenade along Nahal Gadora

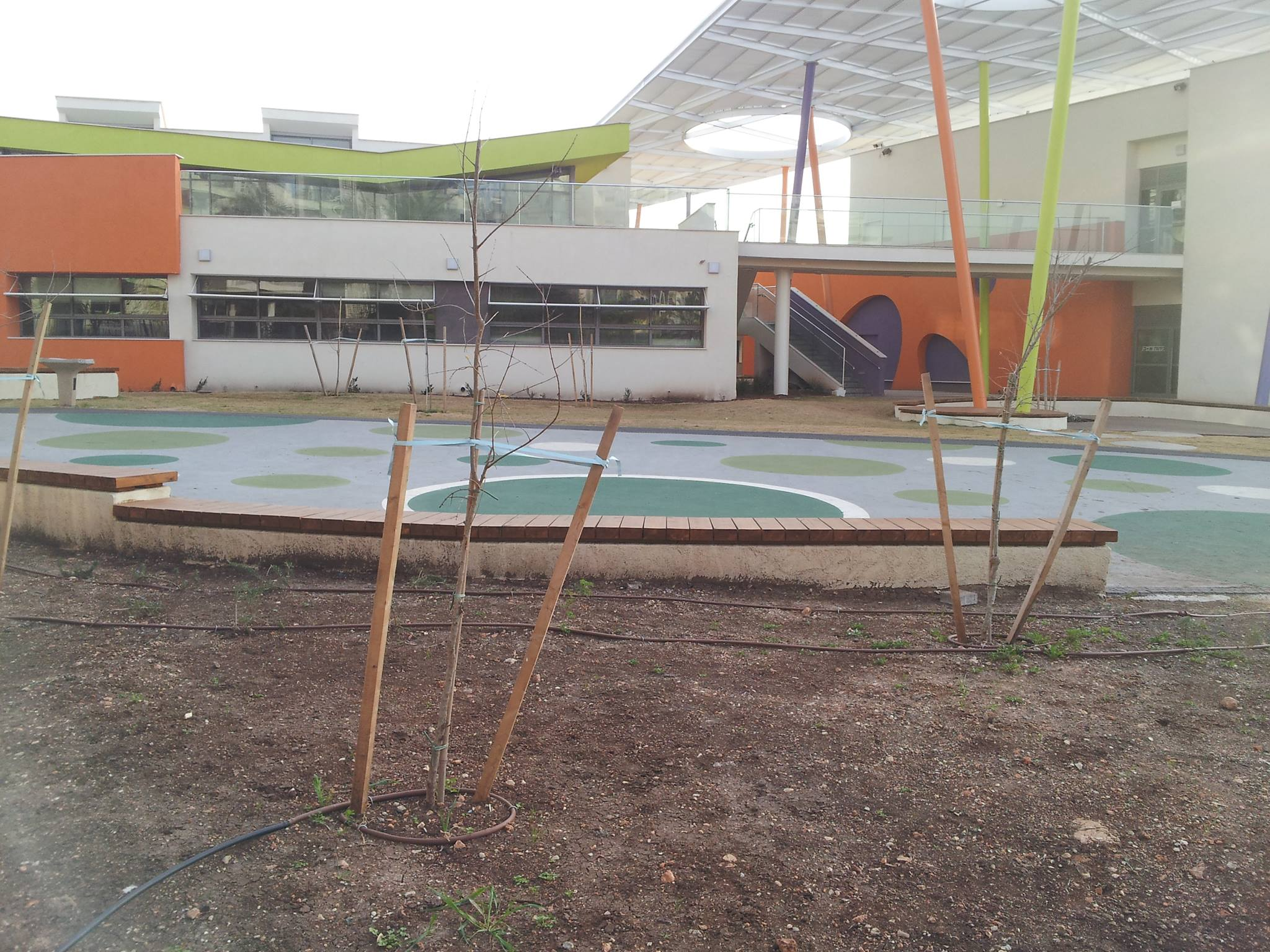
"Rakfot" elementary school schoolyard

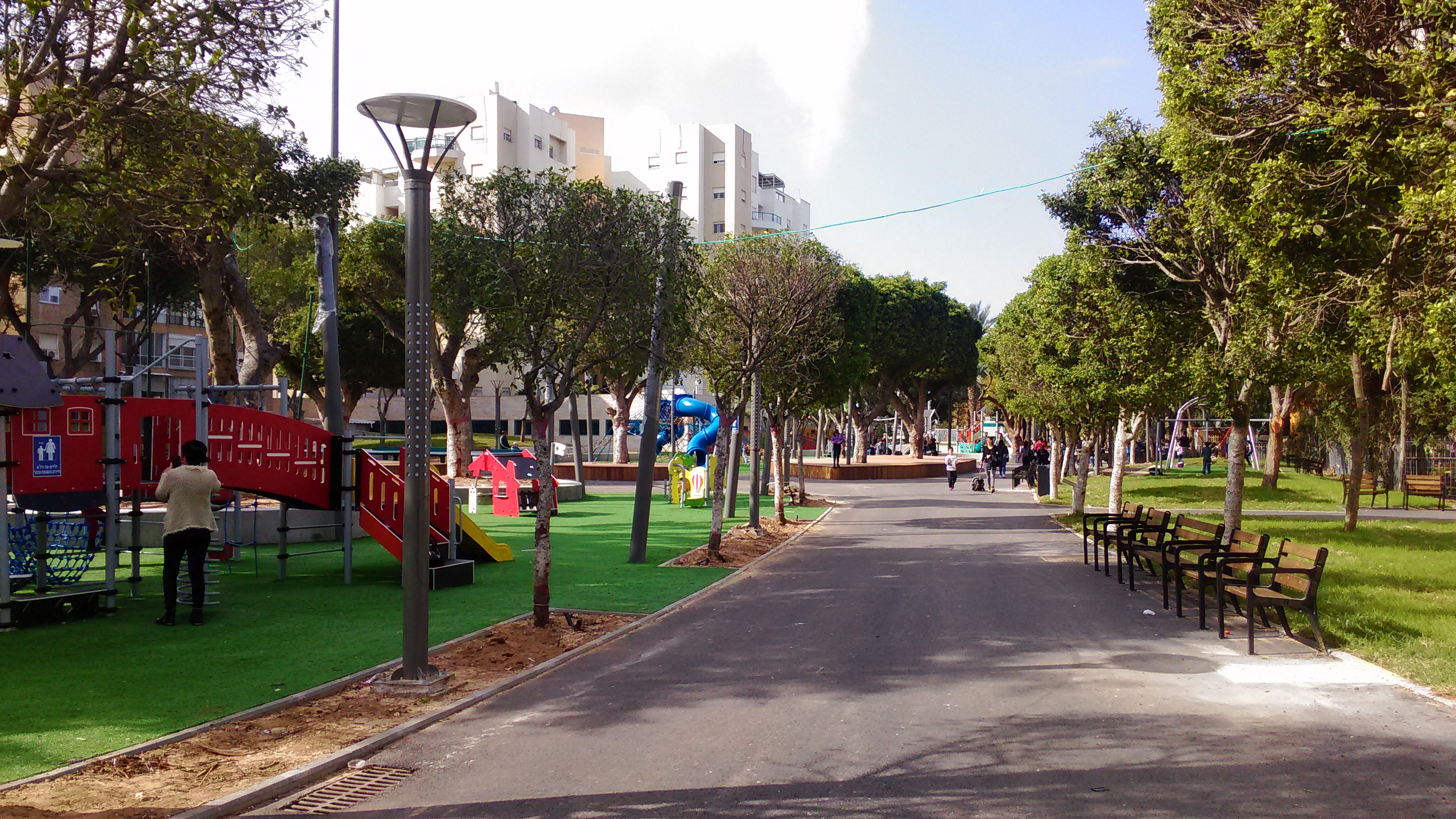
Savion Garden

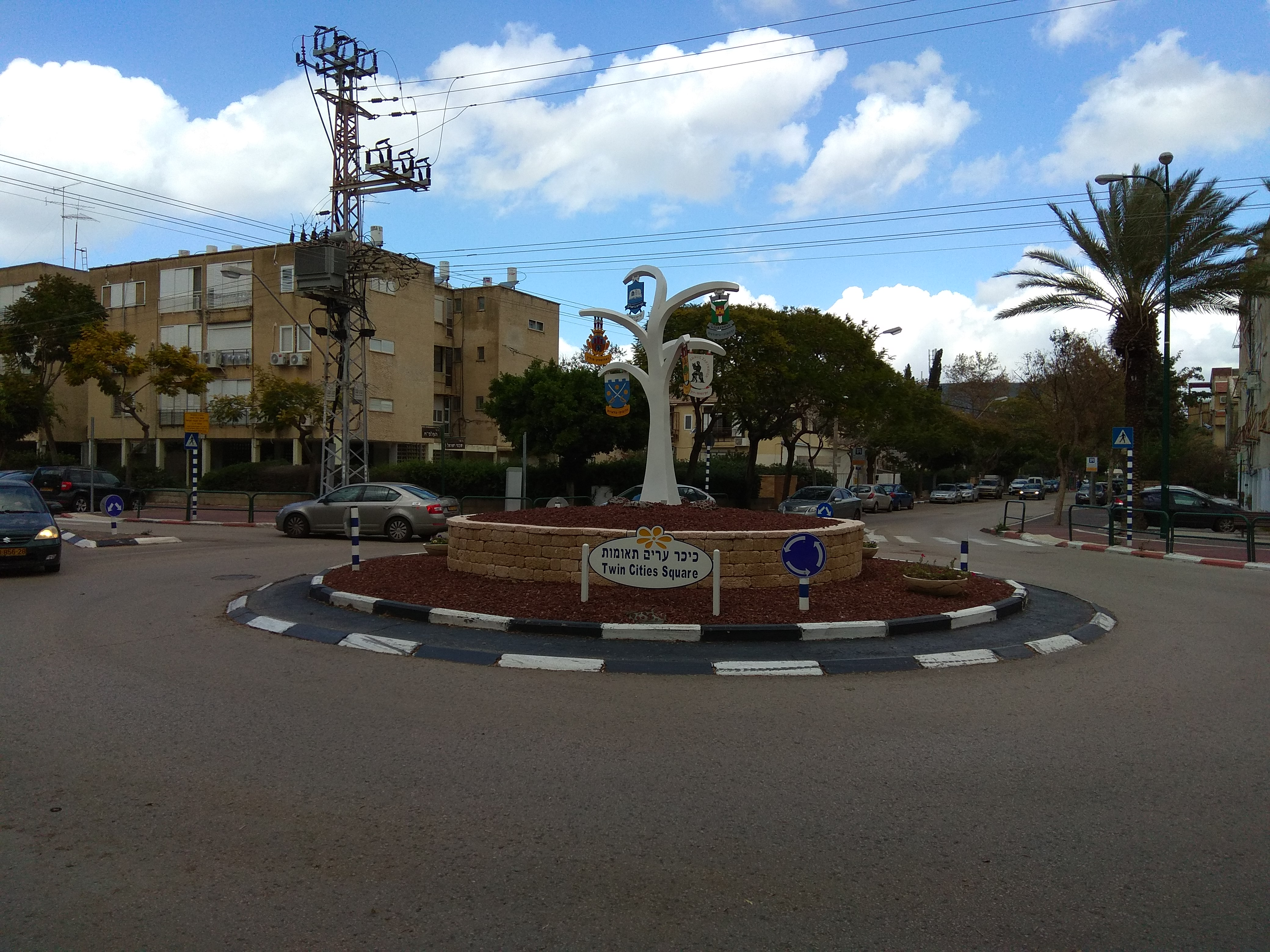
Twin Cities Square

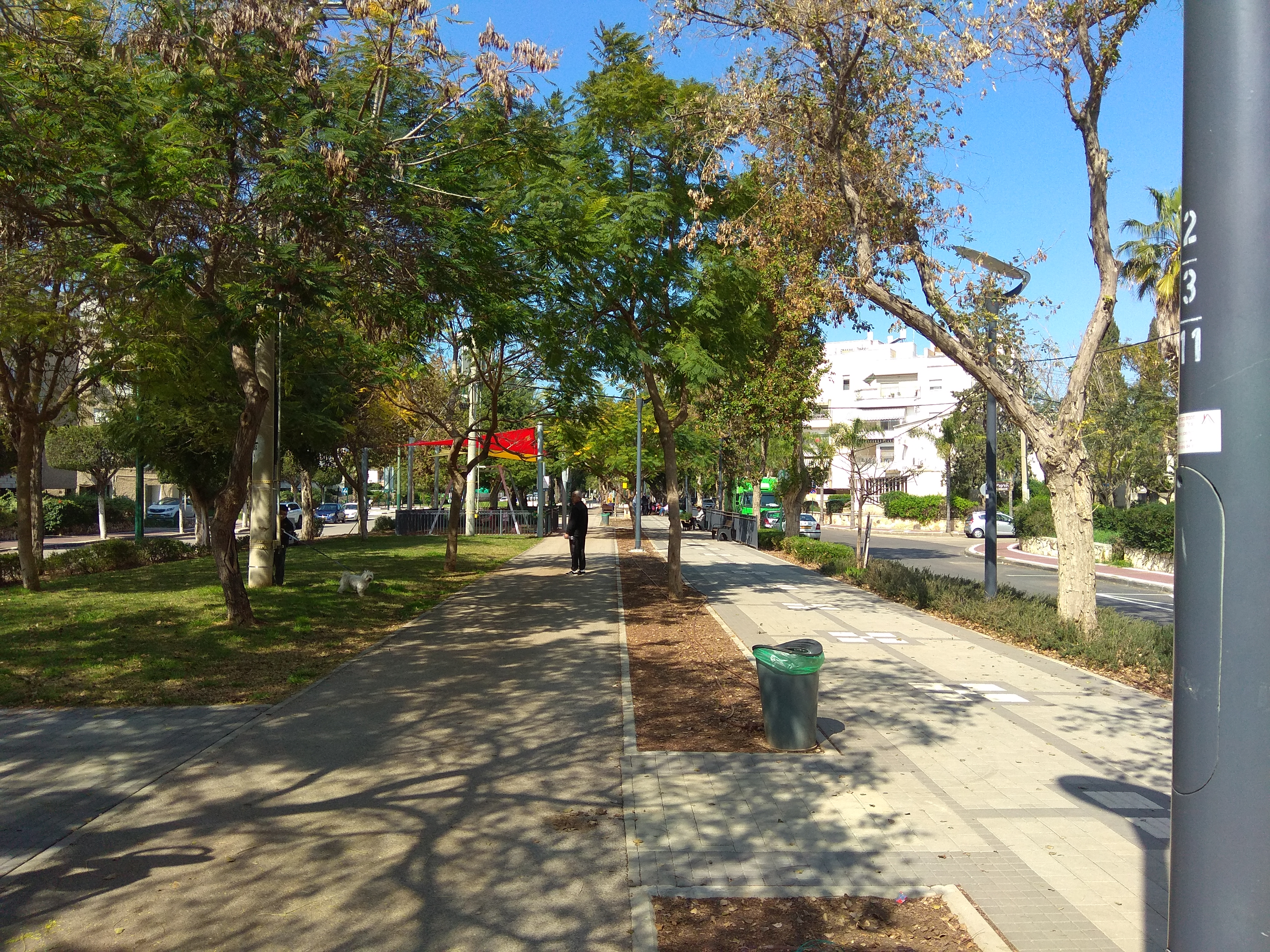
Ben-Gurion Street

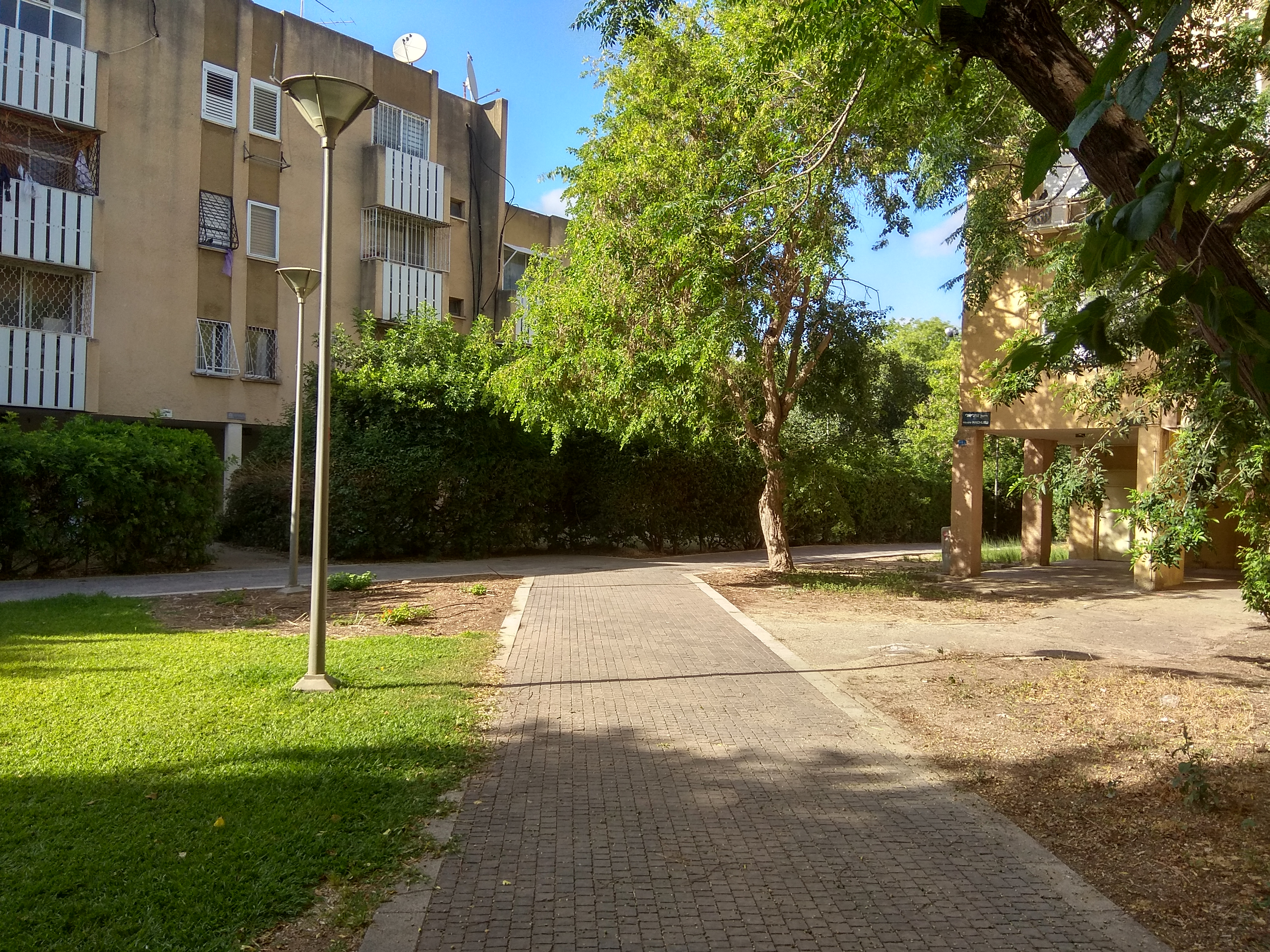
Afek neighborhood
