= Réseau ACTION TI =

Canadian information technology association

Le Réseau ACTION TI
- Company type: Not for profit
- Industry: Professional association
- Founded: 1977
- Headquarters: Montreal, Quebec, Canada
- Key people: Martine Lapointe (President)
- Products: Professionalism
- Website: www.actionti.com

Le Réseau ACTION TI is a non-profit information technology professional association in Quebec, Canada. Founded in 1977, the group was known as Fédération Informatique du Québec prior to 2008.

As of 2019, ACTION TI has around 1,870 members divided into six sections, based in Estrie, Mauricie, Montréal, Québec, Saguenay-Lac-Saint-Jean, and Laval-Laurentides-Lanaudière.

== Mission ==
ACTION TI seeks to connect people in the information technology (IT) sectors of Québec, organize events, help promote excellence, and improve knowledge and skills.

== Accomplishments ==
ACTION TI holds two annual conferences: JIQ, focused on business and IT trends; and Datavore, dedicated to data analysis and visualization.

The group awards the Prix Méritic, an award given to significant figures in the IT industry who can be viewed as role models. Two prizes are given, one for upper management in IT and an individual career award. In 2017, a third prize was added for the entrepreneur of a small/medium-sized business located in Quebec City.

The OCTAS contest has been held every year since 1987, aiming to recognize excellence in information technology in Québec by rewarding individuals, businesses, or organizations for their contributions to the industry. One winner of the categories is also chosen to win a special Excellence award. Trophies are awarded at ACTION TI's annual gala; winners are chosen by jury.
