= Aphik (Asher) =

Aphik or Afik (Hebrew: אפיק), in the Hebrew Bible, is a city in the Tribe of Asher from which the Canaanites were not driven out, identified with the Aphaca of classical times, the modern Afka, or alternatively with Tel Afek near Haifa.

According to the Book of Judges, "And Asher did not dispossess the ones living in Accho, and the ones living in Sidon, and Ahlab, and Achzib, and Helbah, and Aphik, and Rehob."

Aphek is also mentioned twice in the Book of Joshua. "Aphek" is a Topological term, meaning watercourse.

The Oxford Companion to the Bible places it at the southernmost part of the territory of Asher, southeast of Acco. It is a few kilometers from Acco, but scholars speculate whether it's 9 km or more away, depending upon which tel it is associated. In any case, it is inland from the coast, which was held by the Canaanites; "the Iron Age Phoenicians controlled the coastal 'area' associated with the Asherites in this passage."

== See also ==
- Aphek (biblical)
