= Afek (surname) =

Afek (Hebrew: אפק) is a Jewish surname. Notable people with the surname include:

- Arnon Afek (born 1963), Israeli physician
- Omri Afek (born 1979), retired Israeli footballer
- Sharon Afek (born 1970), Israeli general
- Yehuda Afek (born 1952), Israeli computer scientist
- Yochanan Afek (born 1952), Israeli chess player, composer, trainer and arbiter
