= Na'aman River =

Stream in northwestern Israel

Coordinates: 32°52′37.56″N 35°6′23.9″E

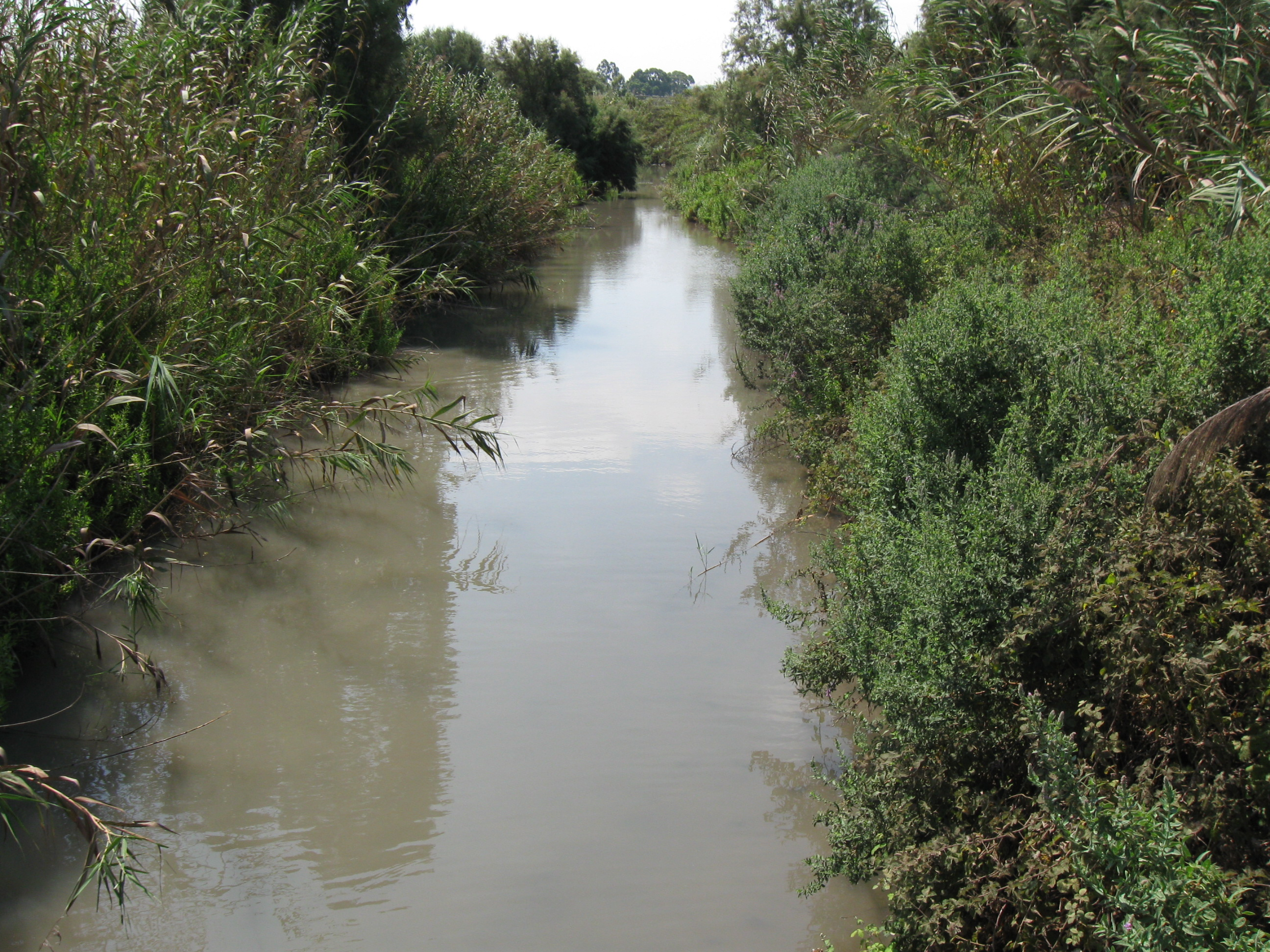
Nahal Na'aman

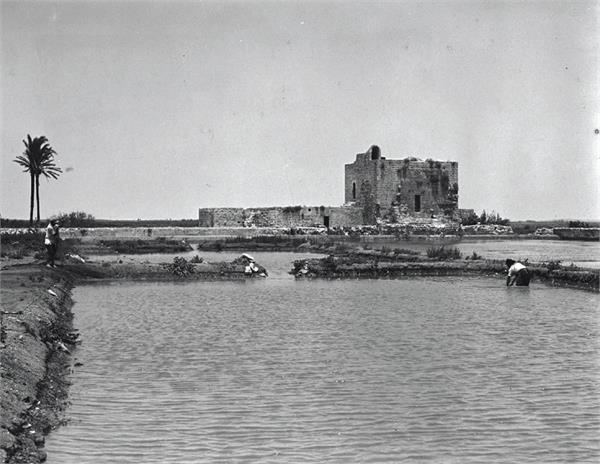
Ein Naaman fish ponds 1927

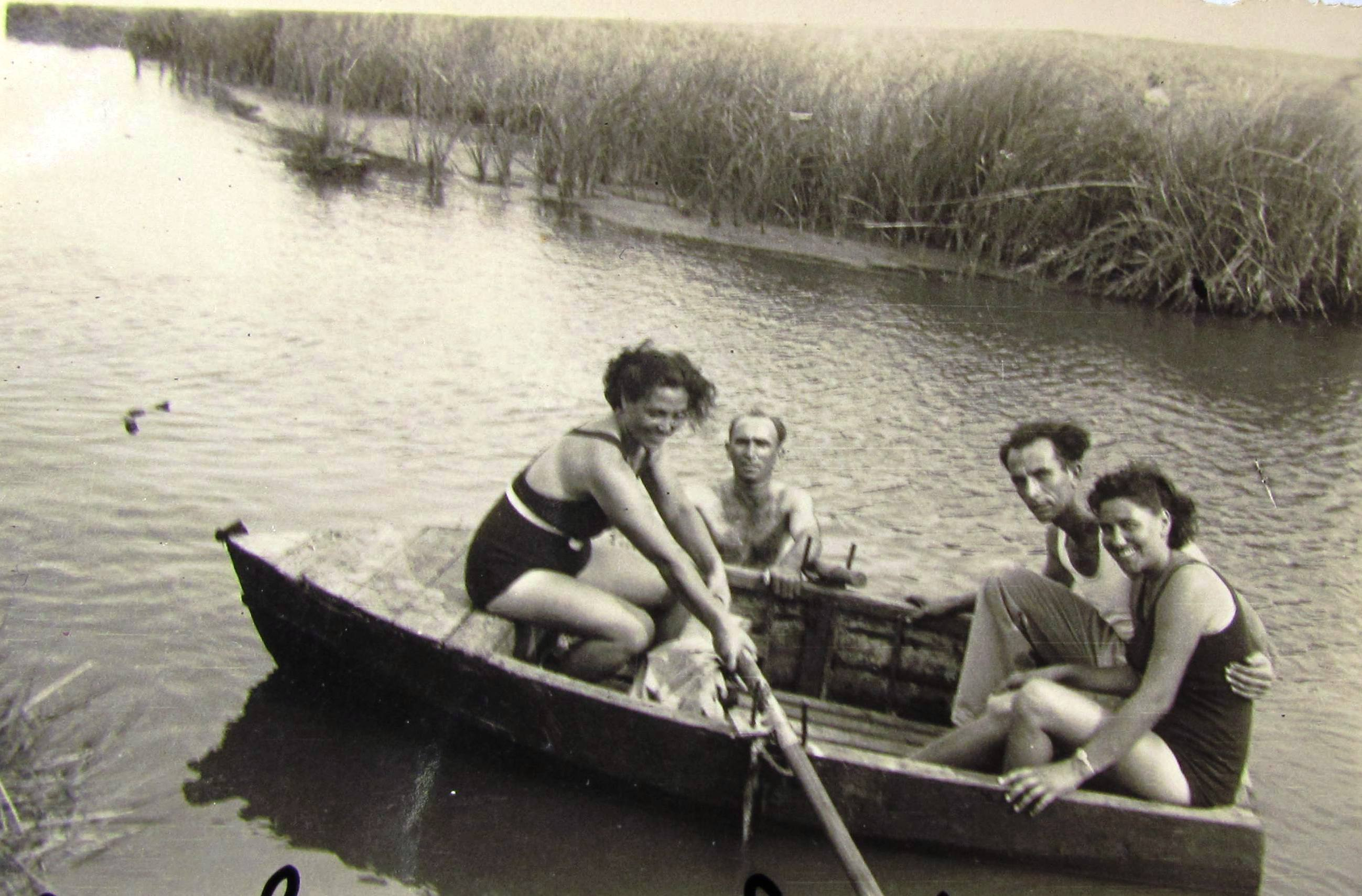
Rowing on Na'aman River, c. 1940-1950

The Na'aman (Hebrew: נחל נעמן, Nahal Na'aman) or Na'mein River (Arabic: نهر النعامين, Nahr Na'mein) is a stream in northwestern Israel. To the ancient writers Pliny, Tacitus, and Josephus, it was known as the Belus (Latin) or Belos River (Ancient Greek: Βῆλος, Bē̂los) of Phoenicia.

== Course ==
The Na'aman River originates from springs near Ein Afek (primarily Ein Nymphit) and flows through the Zebulun Valley from south to north before emptying into the Bay of Haifa (formerly Bay of Acre) south of Acre (Akko) on the Mediterranean Sea. It previously flowed directly south of Tel Akko (the site of ancient Acre) but has shifted over time to be about 800 meters (2,600 ft) away.

The En Afek Nature Reserve near the Haifa Bay suburb of Kiryat Bialik, is the last remnant of the Nahal Na'aman wetlands.

== History ==
Once known as Belus or Belos, the river is mentioned by Isidore of Seville. According to the legend, this is where glass-making was invented. Tacitus also mentions glassmaking at the Belus. Pliny the Elder (Natural History, 5.19), using the name 'Pacida', mentions that the river flowed from Lake Cendevia (now below Mount Carmel) for 5 miles (8.0 km) to the sea near "Ptolemais Ace" (Acre, Israel), and that it was celebrated for its vitreous sands. The name is based on Baal.

== See also ==
- List of rivers of Israel
