= Tel Afek =

Archaeological site in central Israel

- תל אפק (Hebrew)
- Apheq, Recordane (Crusader); Kerdanah (Mamluk); Kufrdani, Kurdany, Kh. Khurdaneh (Ottoman); Kordaneh, Mathanat Kurdani (British Mandate);
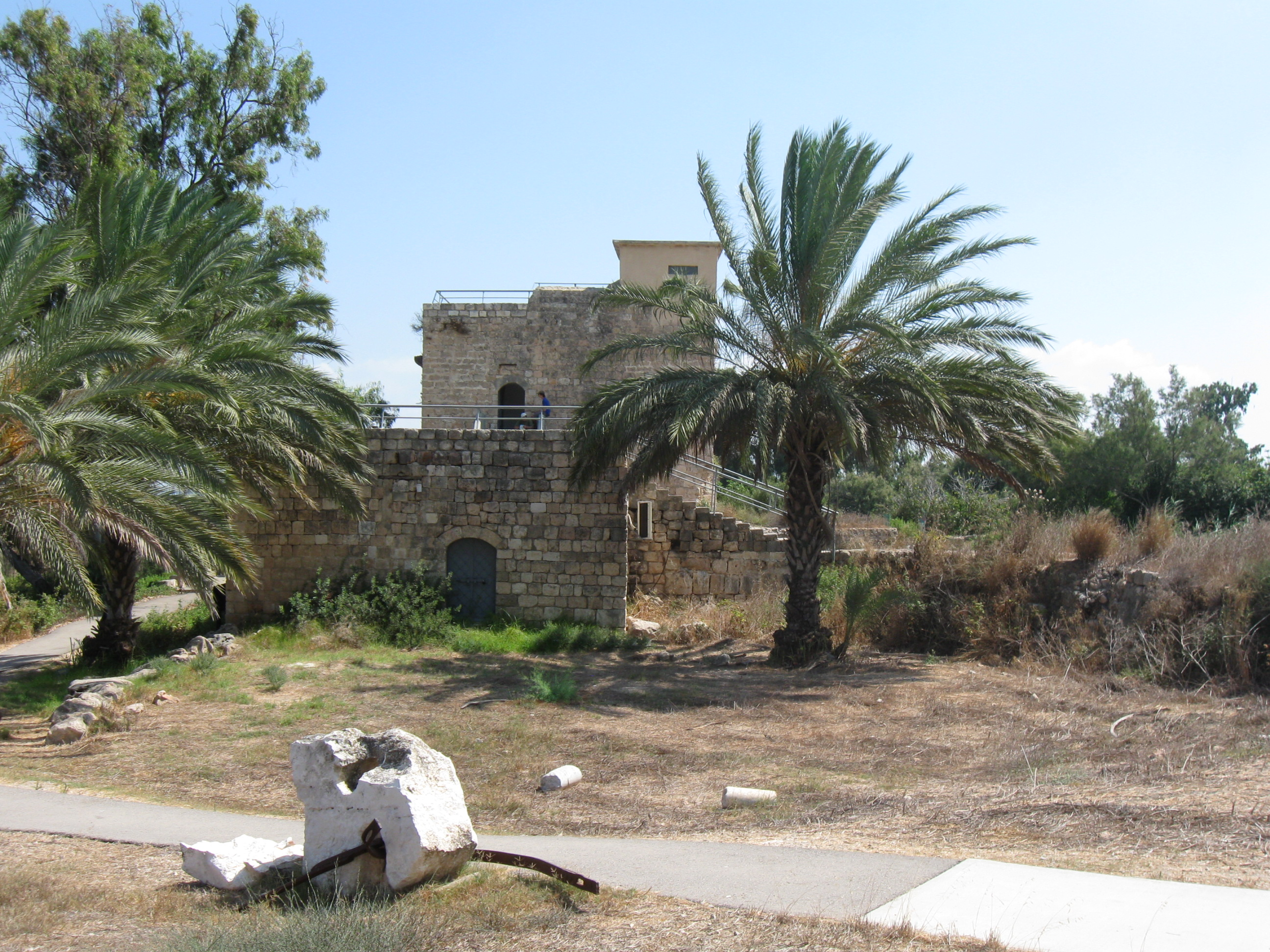
- Afek Crusader mill and fortified tower

- Location within Israel
- 32.846072°N 35.111969°E
- Periods: Middle Bronze Age - Crusader period
- Location: Israel
- Grid position: 160/250 PAL

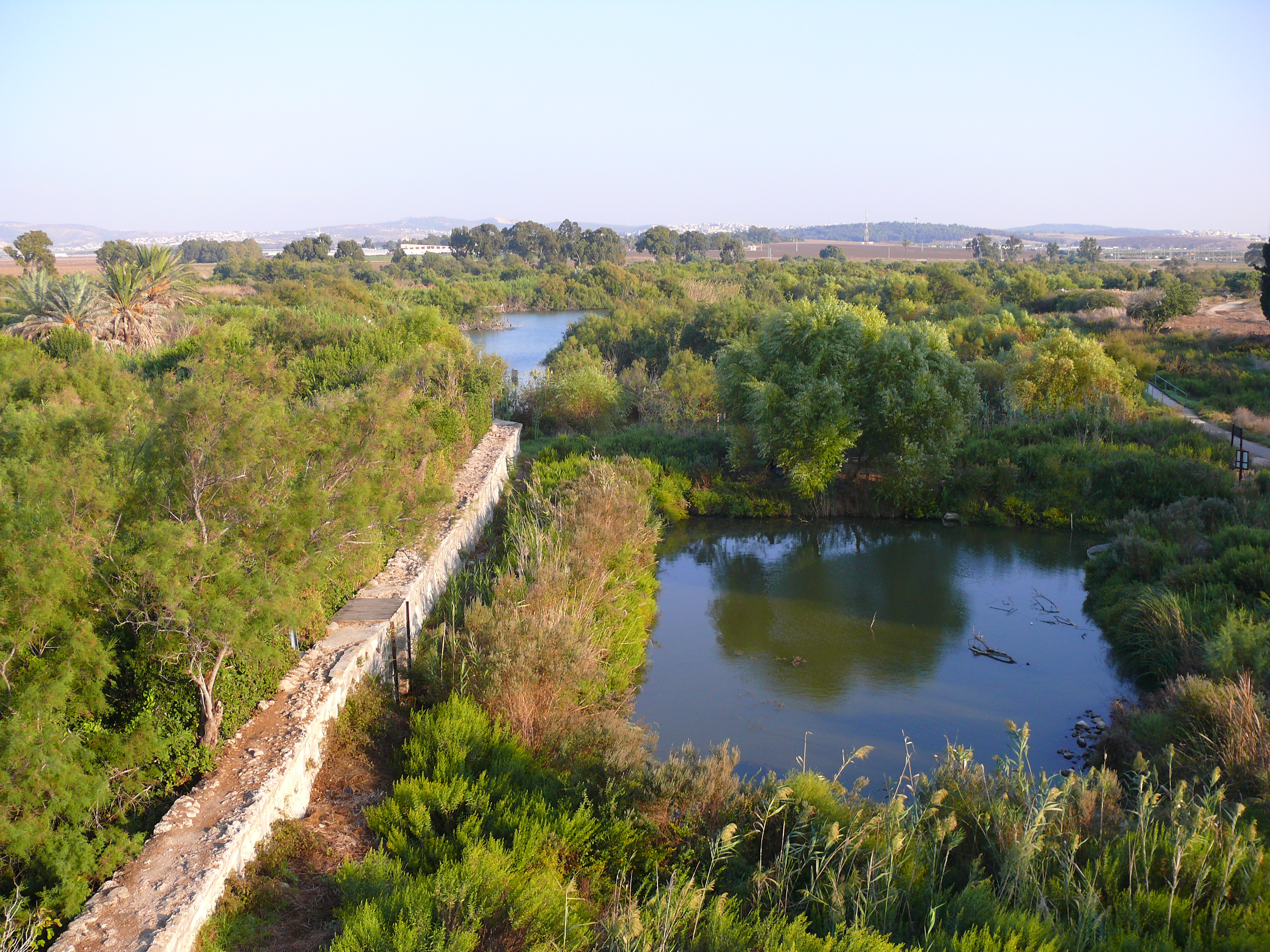
General view of Ein Afek Crusader's dam and ponds

Tel Afek, (Hebrew: תל אפק), also spelled Aphek and Afeq, is an archaeological site located in the coastal hinterland of the Ein Afek Nature Reserve, east of Kiryat Bialik, Israel. It is also known as Tel Kurdani.

== History ==
=== Chalcolithic ===
The site has remains dating back to the Chalcolithic age.

=== Bronze Age ===
Tombs from the Middle Bronze Age and Late Bronze Ages have been excavated here.

A number of burial caves cut into chalk-like bedrock are dated to Middle Bronze Age IIA and are believed to have been reused during Late Bronze Age II. The pottery assemblage consists of vessel types from the Early, Middle and Late Bronze periods, with the later pottery finds presenting both local types and imports, such as Cypriot ‘milk bowls’ and bilbils as well as a few Mycenaean vessels.

=== Classical Age ===
The site is what remains of the biblical town of Aphik or Aphek, which is mentioned in Joshua 19:30 (as "Apheq") and Judges 1:31 (as "Aphīq"), belonging to the Tribe of Asher. According to Biblical history, this area was part of Cabul and was given to Hiram I by Solomon as a reward for various services rendered to him in building the First Temple. 1 Kings 9:12.

Pottery from the Persian, Hellenistic, Roman, and the Byzantine eras have been found here.

=== Crusader/Mamluk era ===
Pottery from the Crusader times have been found here. In the Crusader era, it was known as Recordane, and in 1154, the mill and village was acquired the Hospitalliers. The Hospitalliers owned the water mills here for a number of years. Between 1235 and 1262 the Hospitalliers had a dispute with the Templars about water rights.

Two aqueducts, dating from this era, have been excavated.

In 1283 it was still part of the Crusader states, as it was mentioned as part of their domain in the hudna between the Crusaders based in Acre and the Mamluk sultan Qalawun.

According to al-Maqrizi, it had come under Mamluk rule in 1291, when it was mentioned under the name of Kerdanah when sultan al-Ashraf Khalil allocated the village's income to a waqf in Cairo.

A two-story fortress still stands. A water-powered flour mill operated on the lower floor.

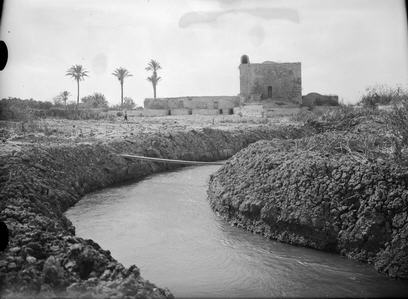
Tel Afek fortress 1926

=== Ottoman era ===
Incorporated into the Ottoman Empire in 1517, it appeared under the name Kufrdani in the census of 1596, located in the Nahiya of Acca of the Liwa of Safad. The village was noted as "hali" (empty), but taxes were paid, a total of 1,800 akçe. All of the revenues went to a waqf. The stair to the tower roof of the mill, and two more wheel-chambers in the southern part of the mill was added in the Ottoman period.

In 1856 it was named Kurdany on Kiepert's map of Palestine published that year.

In 1875 Victor Guérin visited, and noted about Tell el-Kerdaneh: "To the north and bottom of this tell, along the marsh, we observe the remains of an enclosure which measured 54 steps long by 40 wide, and which seems to have been that of a fortified khan. All the walls have been removed; the inner blockage alone partly remained." About the surrounding march, and mill, he noted that it was the origin of the Nahr Na'min, and "These springs, at their origin, are immediately abundant enough to form a considerable river and to turn the millstones of a millstone. Near this mill, we note the lower foundations of an old bridge and the remains of a tower pierced with loopholes and ogival vaults. It had two floors, and was built with ashlars on which many crosses were traced, and some at a height that the hand cannot reach. Therefore, these crosses could not be engraved there by passing travelers, who would have needed a ladder to place them so high, but they must go back to the time when this tower was occupied by Christians, and most likely date from the time of the Crusades. Above the front door was a mâchecoulis balcony, the trace of which is very visible."

In 1881, the PEF's Survey of Western Palestine (SWP) found at Kh. Khurdaneh (east of the mill) only heaps of stones. The name, Kh. Kurdâneh was taken to mean the ruin of Kurdâneh, p.n.

In 1900, Gottlieb Schumacher found here markings on the mill which he took to be Phoenician.

=== British Mandate era ===
The area was acquired by the Jewish community under the Sursock Purchase. In 1925 a Zionist organisation purchased 1,500 dunums in Kordaneh, from Alfred Sursuk, of the Sursuk family of Beirut. At the time, there were 20 families living there.

In the 1931 census of Palestine, Mathanat Kurdani was counted under Shefa-'Amr.

== See also ==
- Archaeology of Israel

== Bibliography ==
- Abu Raya, Rafeh; Porat, Leea (2012-09-19). "Tel Afeq (Northeast)". Hadashot Arkheologiyot – Excavations and Surveys in Israel. 124.
- Accos, Iris (2000). "Tel Afek". Hadashot Arkheologiyot – Excavations and Surveys in Israel (112).
- Al-Maqrizi (1845). Histoire des sultans mamlouks, de l'Égypte, écrite en arabe (in French and Latin). Vol. 2. Translator: Étienne Marc Quatremère. Paris: Oriental Translation Fund of Great Britain and Ireland.
- Barag, Dan (1979). "A new source concerning the ultimate borders of the Latin Kingdom of Jerusalem". Israel Exploration Journal. 29 (3/4): 197–217. JSTOR 27925726.
- Conder, C.R.; Kitchener, H.H. (1881). The Survey of Western Palestine: Memoirs of the Topography, Orography, Hydrography, and Archaeology. Vol. 1. London: Committee of the Palestine Exploration Fund.
- Frankel, Rafael (1988). "Topographical notes on the territory of Acre in the Crusader period". Israel Exploration Journal. 38 (4): 249–272. JSTOR 27926125.
- Guérin, V. (1880). Description Géographique Historique et Archéologique de la Palestine (in French). Vol. 3: Galilee, pt. 1. Paris: L'Imprimerie Nationale.
- Hütteroth, W.-D.; Abdulfattah, K. (1977). Historical Geography of Palestine, Transjordan and Southern Syria in the Late 16th Century. Erlanger Geographische Arbeiten, Sonderband 5. Erlangen, Germany: Vorstand der Fränkischen Geographischen Gesellschaft. ISBN 978-3-920405-41-4.
- Khamisy, Rabei G. (2014). "The Treaty of 1283 between Sultan Qalāwūn and the Frankish Authorities of Acre: A New Topographical Discussion". Israel Exploration Journal. 64, 1: 72–102.
- Mills, E., ed. (1932). Census of Palestine 1931. Population of Villages, Towns and Administrative Areas. Jerusalem: Government of Palestine.
- Ornan, Tallay, 2007, "Labor Pangs: The Revadim Plaque Type", in Bickel, S., Schroer, S. and Uehlinger, Ch. (eds.), Bilder als Quellen / Images as Sources. Studies on Ancient Near Eastern Artefacts and the Bible inspired by the work of Othmar Keel, OBO Special Volume, Fribourg and Göttingen, 2007, pp. 215–235, pl.XXIV. ISBN 978-3-7278-1613-0
- Palmer, E.H. (1881). The Survey of Western Palestine: Arabic and English Name Lists Collected During the Survey by Lieutenants Conder and Kitchener, R. E. Transliterated and Explained by E.H. Palmer. Committee of the Palestine Exploration Fund.
- Petersen, Andrew (2001). A Gazetteer of Buildings in Muslim Palestine (British Academy Monographs in Archaeology). Vol. I. Oxford University Press. pp. 290−291. ISBN 978-0-19-727011-0.
- Porat, Leea (2010-12-26). "Tel Afeq (East)". Hadashot Arkheologiyot – Excavations and Surveys in Israel. 122.
- Pringle, D. (1997). Secular buildings in the Crusader Kingdom of Jerusalem: an archaeological Gazetter. Cambridge University Press. ISBN 0521-46010-7.
- Rhode, H. (1979). Administration and Population of the Sancak of Safed in the Sixteenth Century. Columbia University. Archived from the original on 2016-10-10.
- Röhricht, R. (1893). (RRH) Regesta regni Hierosolymitani (MXCVII-MCCXCI) (in Latin). Berlin: Libraria Academica Wageriana.
- Röhricht, R. (1904). (RRH Ad) Regesta regni Hierosolymitani Additamentum (in Latin). Berlin: Libraria Academica Wageriana.
- Schumacher, G. (1900). "Tell el Kurdaneh". Quarterly Statement - Palestine Exploration Fund. 32: 360.
- Thomson, W.M. (1859). The Land and the Book: Or, Biblical Illustrations Drawn from the Manners and Customs, the Scenes and Scenery, of the Holy Land. Vol. 1 (1 ed.). New York: Harper & brothers. (p. 486)
- Warren, P.M.; Hankey, V. (1989). Aegean Bronze Age Chronology. Bristol Classical Press. ISBN 978-0906515679.
