= Christianity and Druze =

Relationship between Christianity and Druze

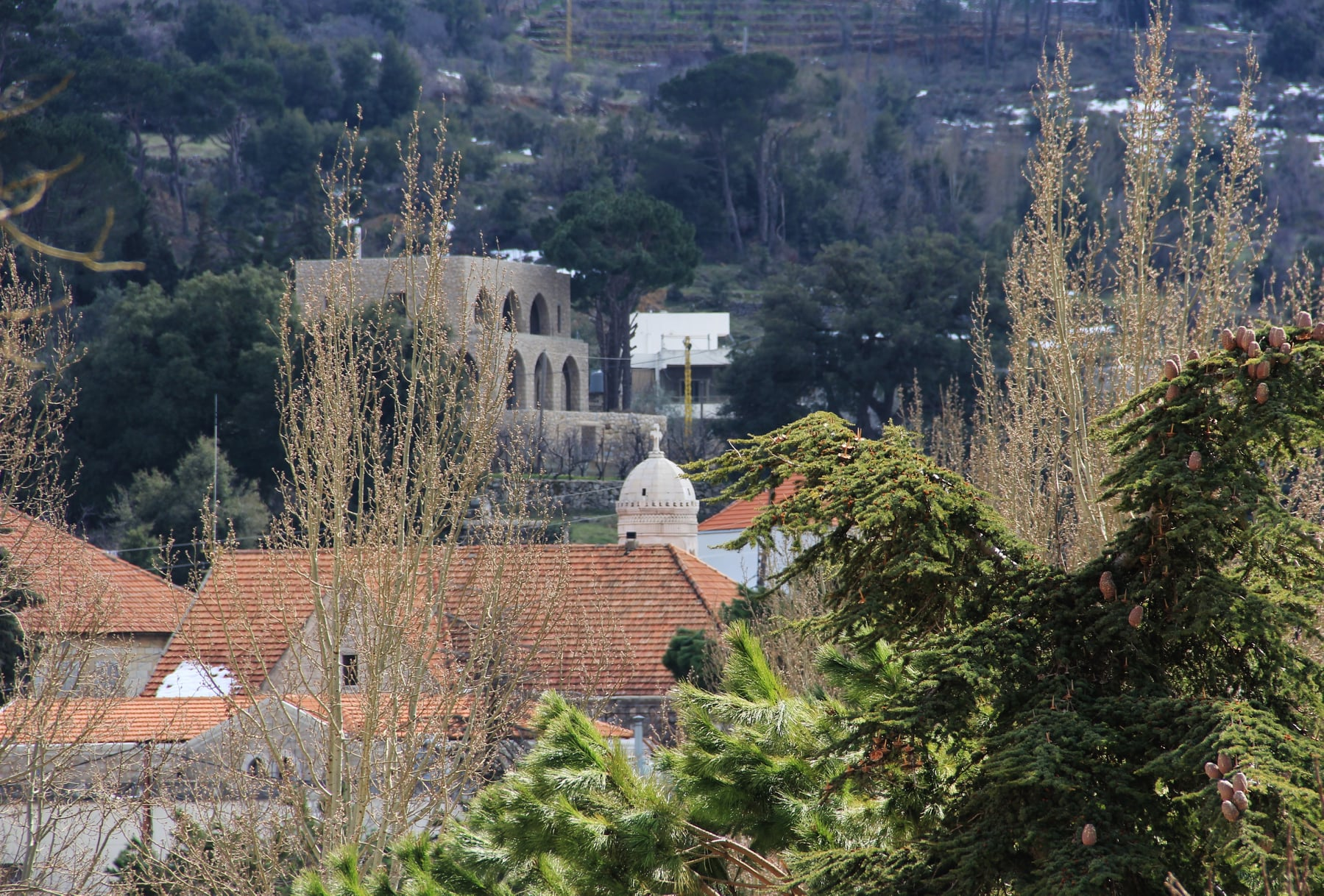
Christian Church and Druze Khalwa in Shuf Mountains: Historically, the Druze and the Christians in the Shuf Mountains lived in complete harmony.

Christianity and Druze are Abrahamic religions that share a historical traditional connection with some major theological differences. The two faiths share a common place of origin in the Middle East and are both monotheistic. Christian and Druze communities share a long history of interaction dating back roughly a millennium, particularly in Mount Lebanon. Over the centuries, they have interacted and lived together peacefully, sharing common social and cultural landscapes, despite occasional exceptions. Moreover, Druze beliefs, scriptures and teachings incorporate several elements from Christianity. Historically, the relationship between the Druze and Christians has been characterized by harmony and peaceful coexistence, with amicable relations between the two groups prevailing throughout history, with the exception of some periods, including 1860 Mount Lebanon civil war. In the Levant region, the conversion of Druze to Christianity was a common practice. Throughout history, there have been instances where prominent members of the Druze community, including some of Shihab dynasty members, as well as the Abi-Lamma clan, embraced Christianity.

The Maronite Catholics and the Druze set the foundation for what is now Lebanon in the early 18th century, through a governing and social system known as the "Maronite-Druze dualism" in Mount Lebanon Mutasarrifate. Interaction between Christians (members of the Maronite, Eastern Orthodox, Melkite, and other churches) and the Druze resulted in the establishment and existence of mixed villages and towns in Mount Lebanon, Chouf, Wadi al-Taym, Jabal al-Druze, the Galilee region, Mount Carmel, and the Golan Heights.

Druze doctrine teaches that Christianity is to be "esteemed and praised", as the Gospel writers are regarded as "carriers of wisdom". Additionally, the Druze catechism prophesies the dominance of Christianity over Islam in the Last Judgment. The Druze faith incorporates some elements of Christianity, along with adopting Christian elements and teachings found in the Epistles of Wisdom. Both religions revered and hold Jesus in high regard as a central figure and the awaited messiah, alongside other shared figures such as the Virgin Mary, John the Baptist, Saint George, Elijah, Luke the Evangelist, and Job. Moreover, important figures from the Old Testament such as Adam, Noah, Abraham, Moses, and Jethro are considered important prophets of God in the Druze faith, being among the seven prophets who appeared in different periods of history.

== Religious comparison ==
Christianity is an Abrahamic monotheistic religion based on the life and teachings of Jesus of Nazareth. Its adherents, known as Christians, believe that Jesus is the Christ, whose coming as the Messiah was prophesied in the Old Testament, and chronicled in the New Testament. The primary scripture of Christianity is the Bible. It is the world's largest religion with about 2.4 billion followers.

Jethro of Midian is considered an ancestor of Druze, who revere him as their spiritual founder and chief prophet. Druzism is a monotheistic and Abrahamic religion based on the teachings of Hamza ibn-'Ali ibn-Ahmad and the sixth Fatimid caliph Al-Hakim bi-Amr Allah, and Greek philosophers such as Plato, Aristotle, Pythagoras, and Zeno of Citium. The Epistles of Wisdom (Rasa'il al-Hikmah; Arabic: رَسَائِل ٱلْحِكْمَة) is the foundational text of the Druze faith. Even though the faith originally developed from Ismaili Islam, the Druze do not identify as Muslims and no longer consider themselves as such. The number of Druze people worldwide is between 800,000 and one million, with the vast majority residing in the Levant.

The Druze faith originated in Isma'ilism, further split from it as it developed its own unique doctrines, and finally separated from both Ismāʿīlīsm and Islam altogether; these include the belief that the Imam Al-Ḥākim bi-Amr Allāh was God incarnate. According to various scholars, the Druze faith "diverge substantially from Islam, both Sunni and Shia". Historian David R. W. Bryer defines the Druzes as ghulat of Isma'ilism, as they exaggerated the cult of the al-Hakim bi-Amr Allah and considered him divine. He also defines the Druze as a religion that deviated from Islam, noting that as a result of this deviation, the Druze faith "seems as different from Islam as Islam is from Christianity or Christianity is from Judaism". Despite originating from Isma'ilism, a branch of Islam, the Druze do not consider themselves Muslims, and they do not adhere to the Five Pillars of Islam.

In terms of religious comparison, mainstream Christian denominations do not believe in reincarnation or the transmigration of the soul, contrary to the beliefs of the Druze; on the other hand, reincarnation is a paramount tenet in the Druze faith. Christianity teaches evangelism, often through the establishment of missions, unlike the Druze who do not accept converts to their faith. Marriage outside the Druze faith is rare and is strongly discouraged. Similarities between the Druze and Christians include commonalities in their view of monogamous marriage, as well as the forbidding of divorce and remarriage, in addition to the belief in the oneness of God and theophany. The Druze faith incorporates some elements of Christianity, and other religious beliefs.

=== Monotheism ===
God in Christianity is believed to be the eternal, supreme deity who created and preserves all things. Christians believe in a monotheistic conception of God, which is both transcendent (wholly independent of, and removed from, the material universe) and immanent (involved in the material universe). Christian teachings on the transcendence, immanence, and involvement of God in the world and his love for humanity exclude the belief that God is of the same substance as the created universe (rejection of pantheism) but accept that God the Son assumed hypostatically united human nature, thus becoming man in a unique event known as "the Incarnation".

The Druze conception of the deity is declared by them to be one of strict and uncompromising unity. The main Druze doctrine states that God is both transcendent and immanent, in which he is above all attributes, but at the same time, he is present. In their desire to maintain a rigid confession of unity, they stripped from God all attributes (tanzīh). In God, there are no attributes distinct from his essence. He is wise, mighty, and just, not by wisdom, might, and justice, but by his own essence. God is "the whole of existence", rather than "above existence" or on his throne, which would make him "limited". There is neither "how", "when", nor "where" about him; he is incomprehensible.

=== Reincarnation ===
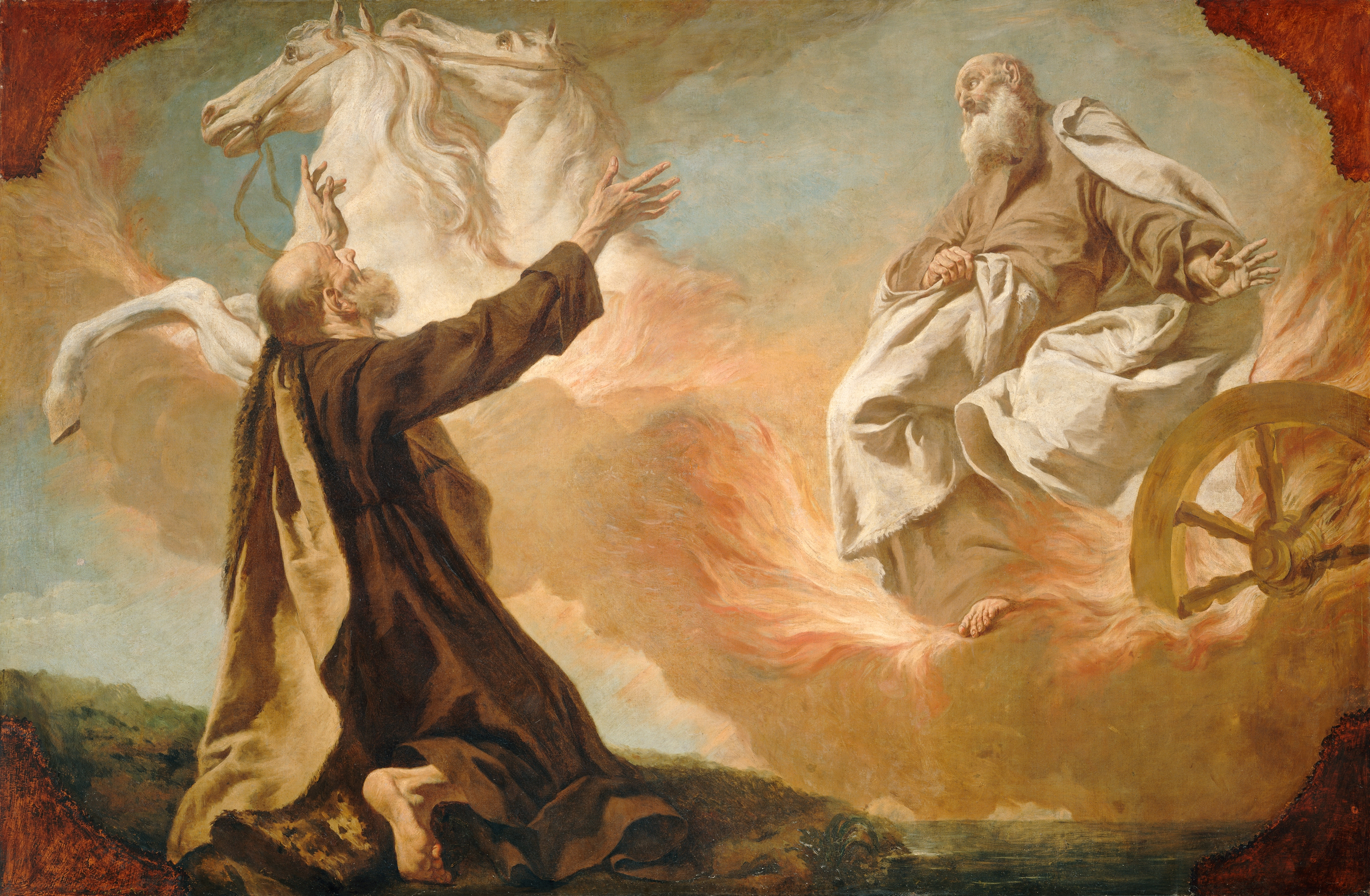
Elijah Taken Up in a Chariot of Fire. Druze, and some Christians, believe that Elijah came back or reincarnated as John the Baptist.

Reincarnation is a paramount tenet in the Druze faith. There is an eternal duality of the body and the soul and it is impossible for the soul to exist without the body. Therefore, reincarnations occur instantly at one's death. While in the Hindu and Buddhist belief system a soul can be transmitted to any living creature, in the Druze belief system this is not possible and a human soul will only transfer to a human body. Furthermore, souls cannot be divided into different or separate parts and the number of souls existing is finite. A male Druze can be reincarnated only as another male Druze and a female Druze only as another female Druze. A Druze cannot be reincarnated in the body of a non-Druze. The cycle of rebirth is continuous and the only way to escape is through a complete soul purification. When this occurs, the soul is united with the Cosmic Mind and achieves the ultimate goal.

In the major Christian denominations, the concept of reincarnation is not present and it is nowhere explicitly referred to in the Bible. However, the impossibility of a second earthly death is stated by 1 Peter 3:18–20, where it affirms that the messiah, Jesus of Nazareth, died once forever for the sins of all the human kind. Matthew 14:1–2 mentions that king Herod Antipas took Jesus to be a risen John the Baptist, when introducing the story of John's execution at Herod's orders. Some Christian theologians interpret certain Biblical passages as referring to reincarnation. These passages include the questioning of Jesus as to whether he is Elijah, John the Baptist, Jeremiah, or another prophet (Matthew 16:13–15 and John 1:21–22) and, less clearly (while Elijah was said not to have died, but to have been taken up to heaven), John the Baptist being asked if he is not Elijah (John 1:25).

Around the 11–12th century in Europe, several reincarnationist movements were persecuted as heresies, through the establishment of the Inquisition in the Latin Christendom. These included the Cathar, Paterene or Albigensian church of western Europe, the Paulician movement, which arose in Armenia, and the Bogomils in Bulgaria. Christian sects such as the Bogomils and the Cathars, who professed reincarnation and other gnostic beliefs, were referred to as "Manichaean", and are today sometimes described by scholars as "Neo-Manichaean". As there is no known Manichaean mythology or terminology in the writings of these groups there has been some dispute among historians as to whether these groups truly were descendants of Manichaeism.

=== Incarnation ===
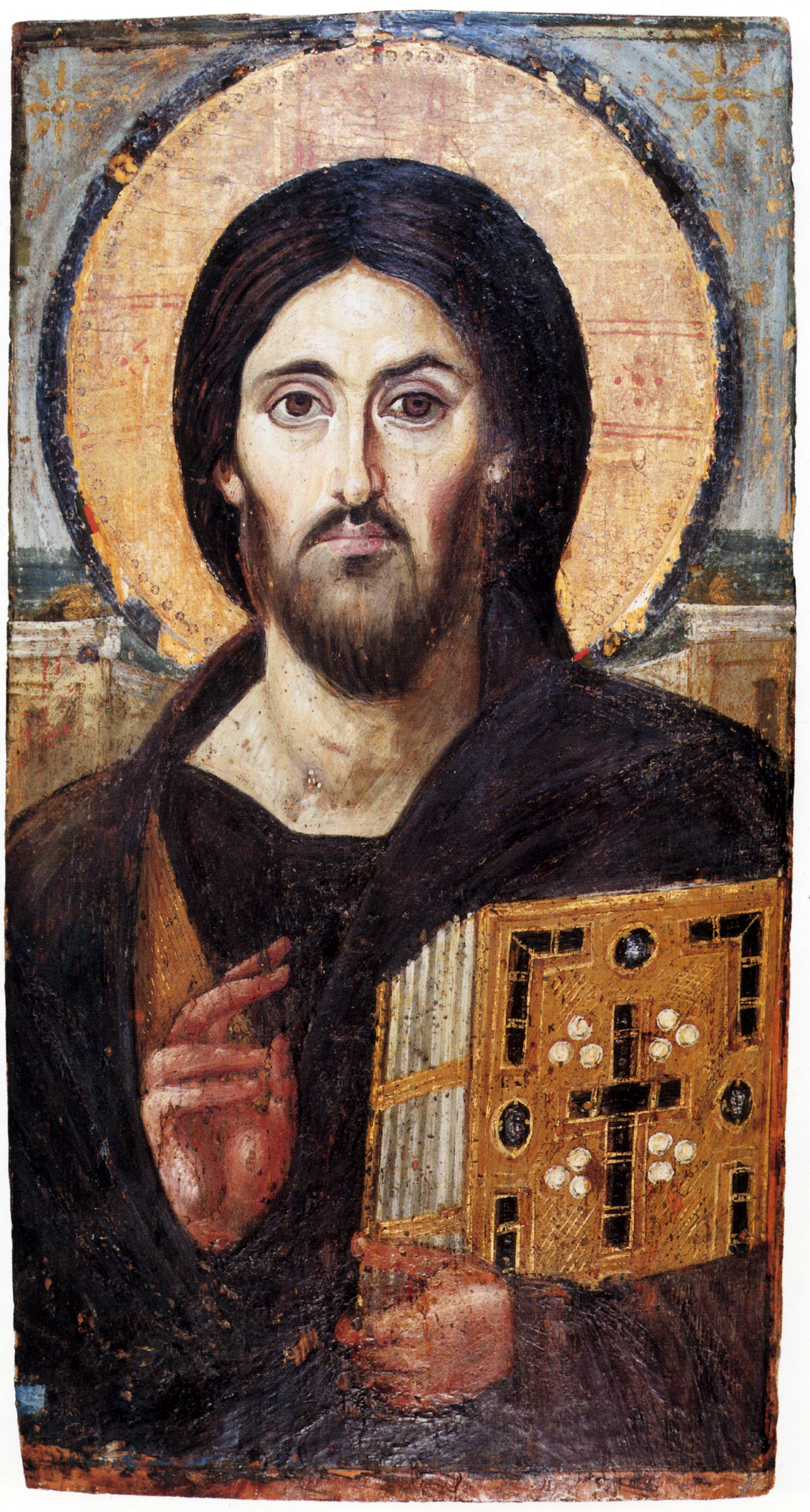
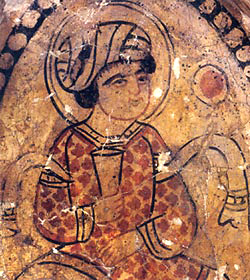
Jesus (left) and Al-Ḥākim bi-Amr Allāh (right)

The Druze faith further split from Isma'ilism as it developed its own unique doctrines, and finally separated from both Ismāʿīlīsm and Islam altogether; these include the belief that the Imam Al-Ḥākim bi-Amr Allāh was God incarnate. Hamza ibn Ali ibn Ahmad is considered the founder of the Druze faith and the primary author of the Druze manuscripts, he proclaimed that God became flesh, assumed a human nature, and became a man in the form of al-Hakim bi-Amr Allah.

Historian David R. W. Bryer defines the Druzes as ghulat of Isma'ilism, since they exaggerated the cult of the caliph al-Hakim bi-Amr Allah and considered him divine; he also defines the Druzes as a religion that deviated from Islam. He also added that as a result of this deviation, the Druze faith "seems as different from Islam as Islam is from Christianity or Christianity is from Judaism".

The incarnation of Jesus is the central Christian doctrine that God became flesh, assumed a human nature, and became a man in the form of Jesus, the Son of God and the second person of the Trinity. This foundational Christian position holds that the divine nature of the Son of God was perfectly united with human nature in one divine Person, Jesus, making him both truly God and truly human. The theological term for this is hypostatic union: the second person of the Trinity, God the Son, became flesh when he was miraculously conceived in the womb of the Virgin Mary.

=== Views on circumcision ===
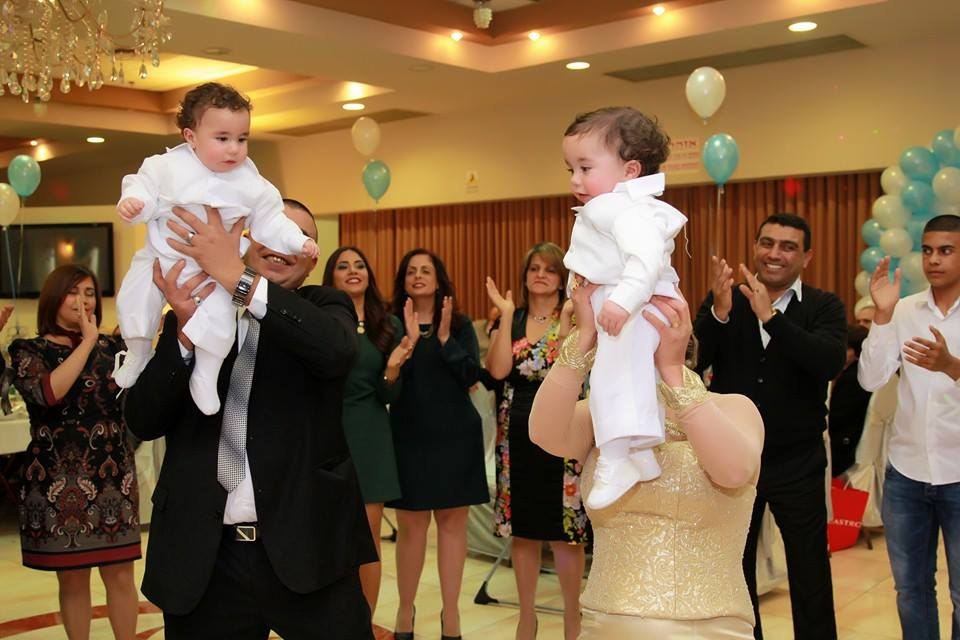
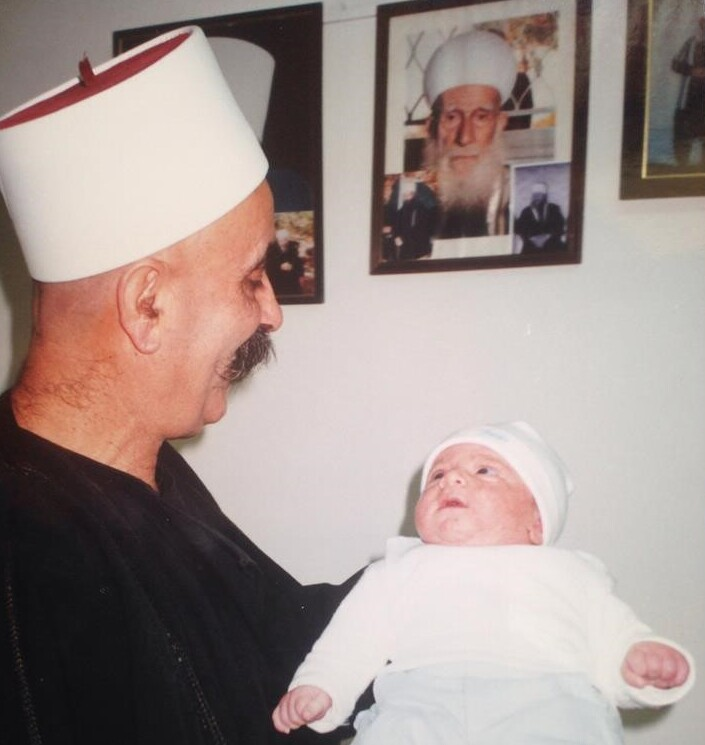
Coptic Christian children wearing traditional circumcision costumes (left) and a Druze child preparing for a ritual circumcision (right)

Christianity does not require male circumcision, with covenant theology teaching that the Christian sacrament of baptism fulfills the Israelite practice of circumcision, both being signs and seals of the covenant of grace. Most mainstream Christian denominations currently maintain a neutral position on the practice of non-religious circumcision. Male circumcision is commonly practiced in many predominantly Christian countries and many Christian communities. In the Coptic Orthodox Church, the Ethiopian Orthodox Church and the Eritrean Orthodox Tewahedo Church male circumcision is an established practice, and require that their male members undergo circumcision, and it is seen as a rite of passage.

While male circumcision is widely practiced by the Druze, the procedure is practiced as a cultural tradition, and has no religious significance in the Druze faith. There is no special date for this act in the Druze faith: male Druze infants are usually circumcised shortly after birth, however some remain uncircumcised until the age of ten or older. Some Druzes do not circumcise their male children, and refuse to observe this "common Muslim practice".

=== Views on Marriage ===
From the earliest days of the Christian faith, Christian teaching have viewed marriage as a divinely blessed, lifelong, monogamous union between a man and a woman. However, while many Christians might agree with the traditional definition, the terminology and theological views of marriage have varied through time in different countries, and among Christian denominations. The Bible and its traditional interpretations in Christianity have historically affirmed and endorsed a patriarchal and heteronormative approach towards human sexuality, favouring exclusively penetrative vaginal intercourse between men and women within the boundaries of marriage over all other forms of human sexual activity. Christian teaching has never held that marriage is necessary for everyone; historically Christians who did not marry were expected to refrain from all sexual activity, as were those who took holy orders or monastic vows.

The Druze rejection of polygamy, unlike in traditional Islamic traditions, highlights a significant alignment with Christianity. While the Druze cite certain Quranic verses to justify their position, it more closely mirrors the Christian perspective on marriage. Additionally, the practice of monasticism by some Druze sheikhs is highly regarded within their community. It's not uncommon for a sheikh to request celibacy from his fiancée, and many Druze sheikhs remain unmarried throughout their lives. In Druze belief, sex is seen not as an end in itself but as a means of reproduction, with certain sexual forms considered sinful. This demonstrates the Druze adherence to Christian teachings on marriage and the value of marital mutual relationships. Overall, the Druze community's approach to marriage closely resembles that of Christians.

=== Inter-religious marriages ===
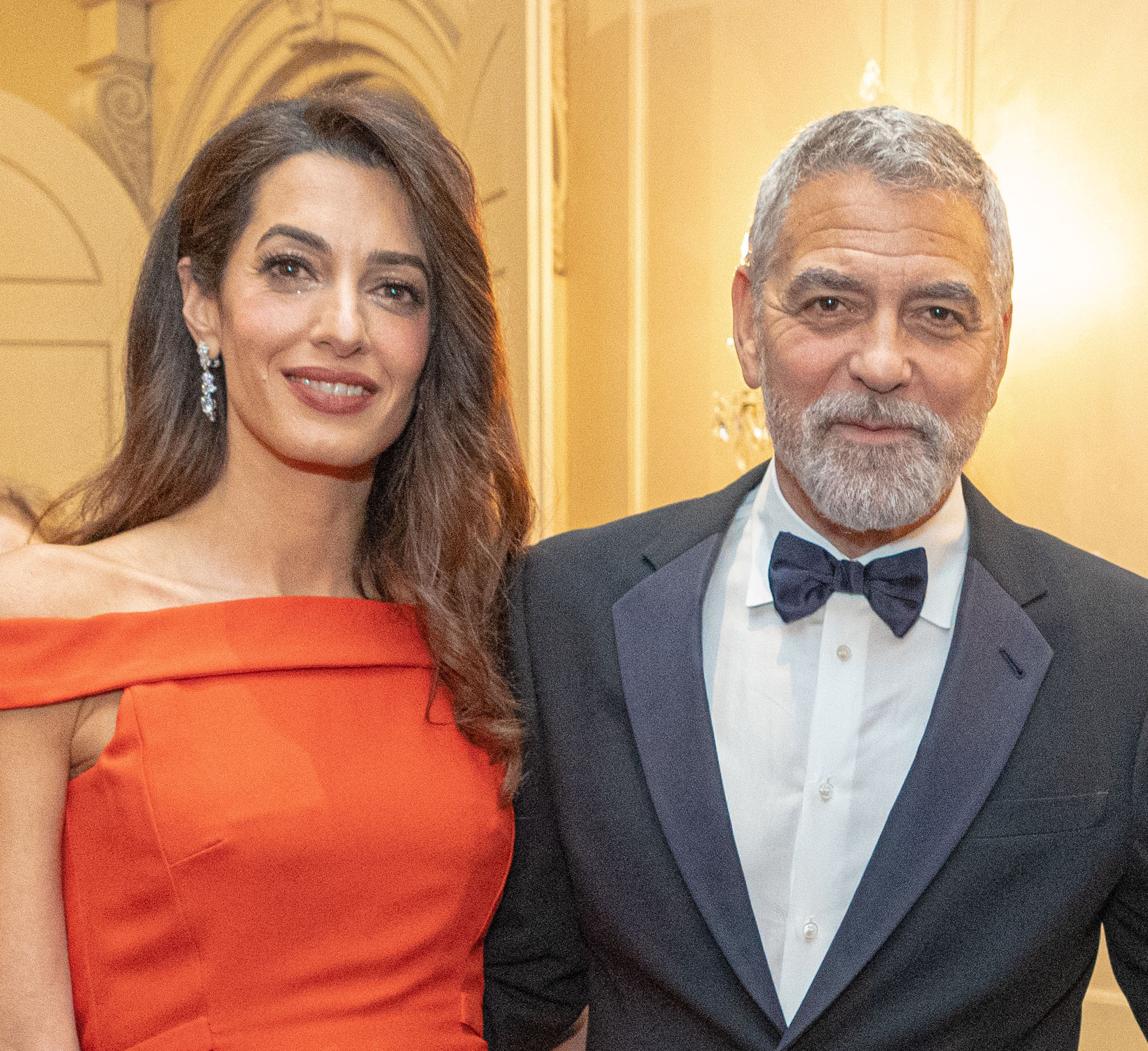
Amal Alamuddin, who is of Druze descent, with her husband George Clooney, who is a lapsed Catholic.

In terms of interfaith marriage, many Christian denominations caution against it, citing verses of the New Testament that prohibit it such as 2 Corinthians 6:14–15, while certain Christian denominations have made allowances for interfaith marriage, which is referenced in 1 Corinthians 7:14–15, verses where Saint Paul addresses originally non-Christian couples in which one of the spouses converts to Christianity after the marriage between two originally non-Christian persons had already taken place. Many Christian denominations, such as the Eastern Orthodox and Oriental Orthodox Churches, discourage or forbid interfaith marriage. They require the non-Christian partner to convert to Christianity and undergo baptism for the marriage to be permitted. The Catholic Church allows Catholics to marry non-baptized individuals, such as Jews and Muslims, in the church through a legal provision known as the "pauline privilege". This is allowed provided there is no risk to the Catholic partner's faith or to the upbringing of children in the Catholic faith. On the other hand, the Assyrian Church regulations state that a Christian woman is not allowed to marry a non-Christian, while a Christian man is allowed to marry a non-Christian woman.

The Druze doctrine does not permit outsiders to convert to their religion, as only one who is born to Druze parents can be considered a Druze. Marriage outside the Druze faith is uncommon and strongly discouraged for both males and females. If a Druze individual, whether male or female, marries a non-Druze, they may face ostracism and marginalization from their community. Since a non-Druze partner cannot convert to the Druze faith, the couple cannot have Druze children, as the Druze faith can only be inherited from two Druze parents at birth. Marrying a non-Druze, whether male or female, is viewed as apostasy from the Druze religion. The Druze community holds a negative perception of apostates who marry outside the religion. Consequently, those who leave the Druze religion due to interfaith marriage are forced to leave their village and are exiled to distant, non-Druze areas. This religious and social pressure leads to their isolation and classification as outcasts within their Druze community.

== Perspectives on common figures ==
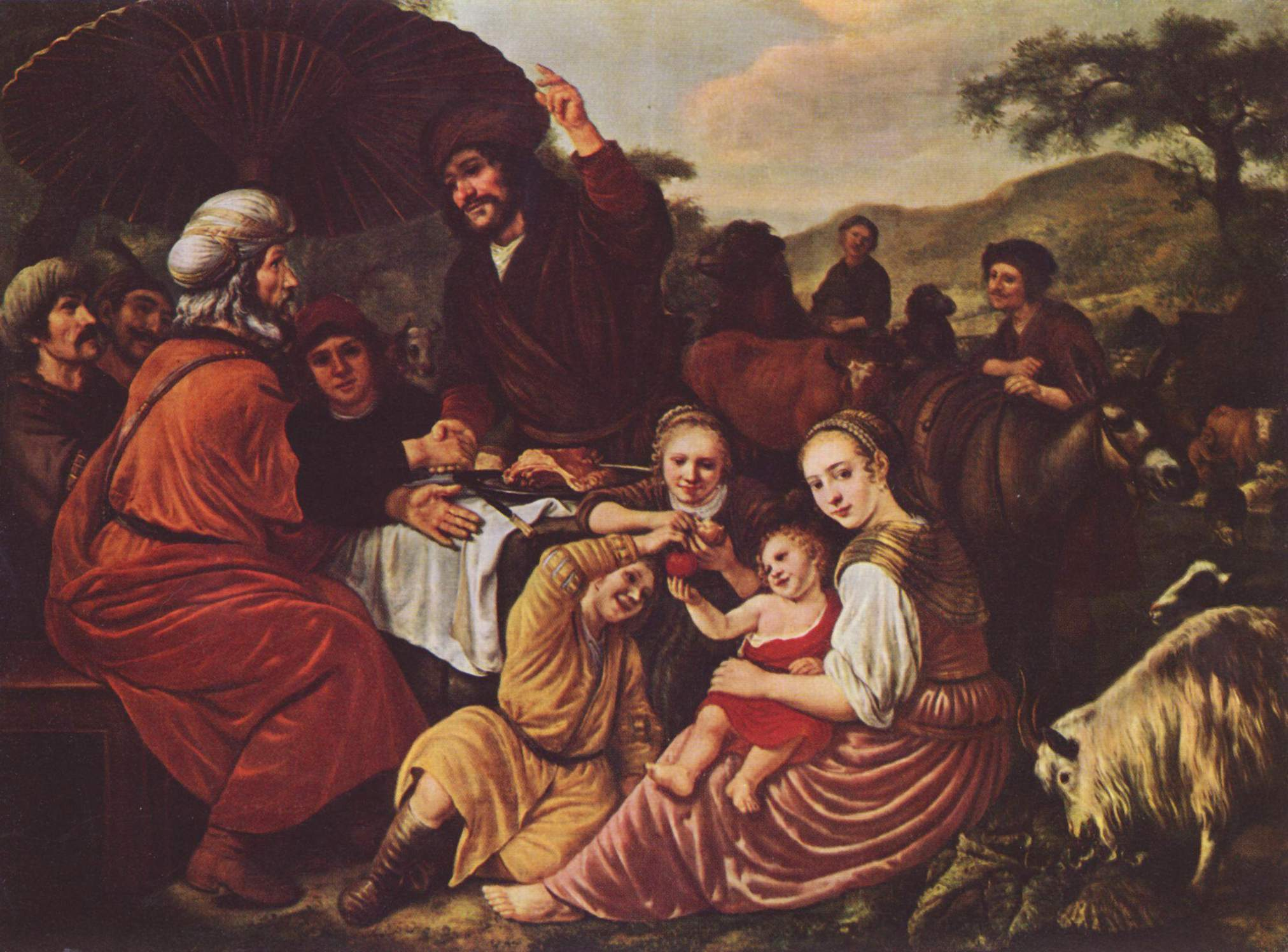
Moses takes his leave of Jethro by Jan Victors, c. 1635, from the incident in Exodus 4:18. Jethro (Shuaib) is seated on the left, in red.

Druze doctrine teaches that Christianity is to be "esteemed and praised" as the Gospel writers are regarded as "carriers of wisdom". Both religions revere Jesus, the Virgin Mary, John the Baptist, Saint George, Elijah, Luke the Evangelist, Job, Zechariah, Ezekiel, Zebulun, Sabbas the Sanctified and other common figures. The Druze faith shows influence of Christian monasticism, among other religious practices.

Figures in the Old Testament such as Adam, Noah, Abraham, Moses, are considered important prophets of God in the Druze faith, being among the seven prophets who appeared in different periods of history. Noah, Abraham, Moses, Elijah, Ezekiel and Job are recognised as prophets in Christianity. In the Old Testament, Jethro was Moses' father-in-law, a Kenite shepherd and priest of Midian. Muslim scholars and the Druze identify Jethro with the prophet Shuaib, also said to come from Midian. Shuaib or Jethro of Midian is considered an ancestor of the Druze who revere him as their spiritual founder and chief prophet.

Christian saints such as Marina the Monk are also honored among the Druze, who refer to her as "Al-Sitt Sha'wani'", the shrine of "Al-Sitt Sha'wani'" is located in the region of Amiq on the slopes of Mount Barouk to the east, overlooking the Beqaa Valley and Mount Hermon. Due to the Christian influence on the Druze faith, two Christian saints become the Druze's favorite venerated figures: Saint George and the Prophet Elijah. According to scholar Ray Jabre Mouawad, the Druze appreciated the two saints for their bravery, Saint George because he confronted the dragon and the Prophet Elijah because he competed with the pagan priests of Baal and won over them. In both cases the explanations provided by Christians are that Druzes were attracted to warrior saints that resemble their own militarized society. Saint George is considered the patron saint of Lebanese Christians, Palestinian Christians, Syrian Christians, and the Druze.

Salman the Persian is honored as a prophet in the Druze faith, and as an incarnation of the monotheistic idea. As a practicing Zoroastrian, he dedicated much of his early life to studying to become a magus, though he later became preoccupied with travelling throughout Western Asia to engage in interfaith dialogue with other religious groups. His quests eventually prompted his conversion to Christianity and later his conversion to Islam, which occurred after he met and befriended Muhammad in the city of Yathrib. In 587 he met a Nestorian Christian group and was impressed by them. Against the wishes of his father, he left his family to join them. His family imprisoned him afterwards to prevent him but he escaped.

=== Perspectives on Jesus ===
Both faiths give a prominent place to Jesus: Jesus is the central figure of Christianity, and in the Druze faith, Jesus is considered an important prophet of God, being among the seven prophets who appeared in different periods of history.

==== Christianity ====
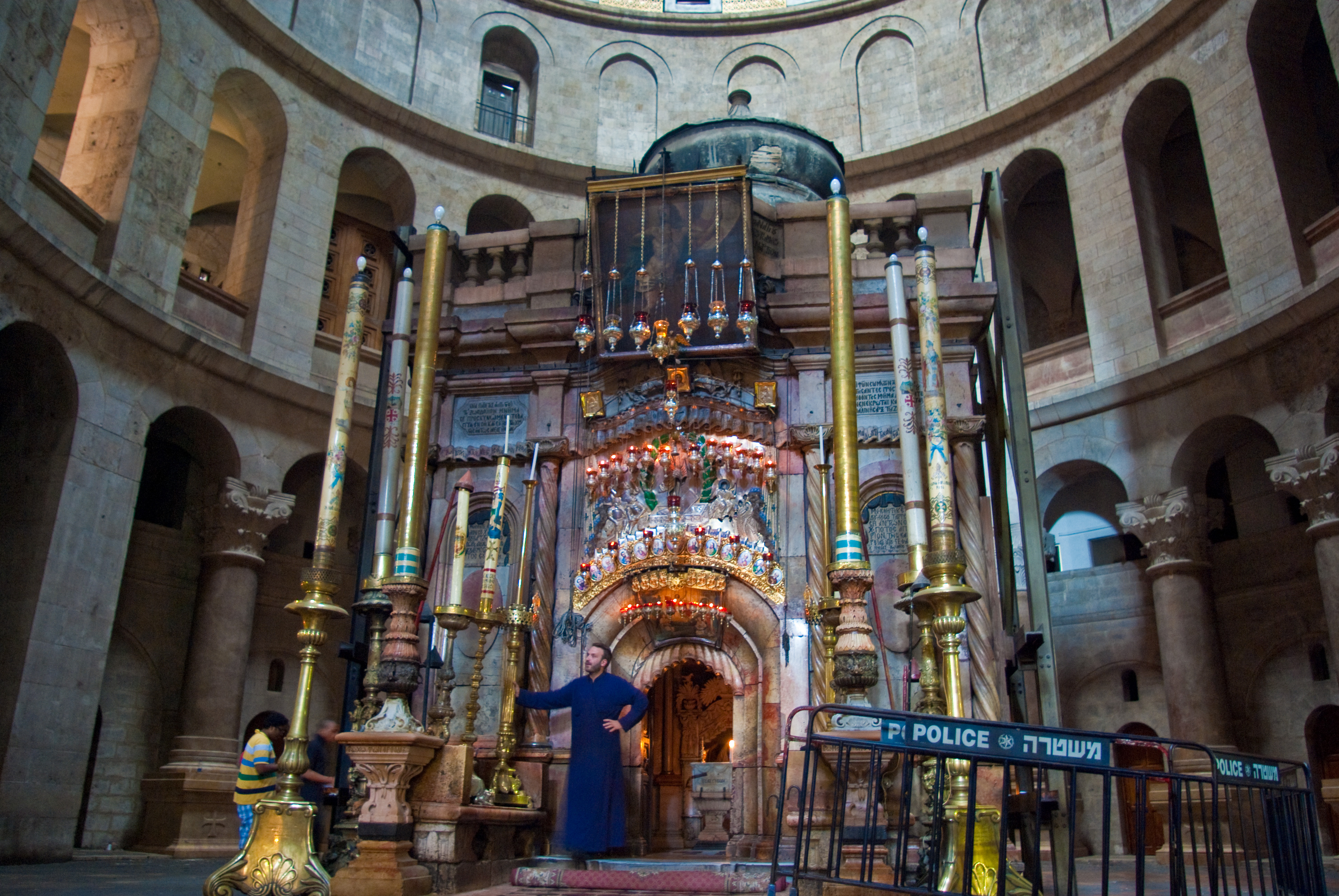
Tomb of Jesus in the Holy Sepulchre church in Jerusalem

Jesus is the central figure of Christianity. Although Christian views of Jesus vary, it is possible to summarize the key beliefs shared among major denominations, as stated in their catechetical or confessional texts. Christian views of Jesus are derived from various sources, including the canonical gospels and New Testament letters such as the Pauline epistles and the Johannine writings. These documents outline the key beliefs held by Christians about Jesus, including his divinity, humanity, and earthly life, and that he is the Christ and the Son of God. Despite their many shared beliefs, not all Christian denominations agree on all doctrines, and both major and minor differences on teachings and beliefs have persisted throughout Christianity for centuries.

Christian doctrines include the beliefs that Jesus was conceived by the Holy Spirit, was born of a virgin named Mary, performed miracles, founded the Christian Church, died by crucifixion as a sacrifice to achieve atonement for sin, rose from the dead, and ascended into Heaven, from where he will return. Commonly, Christians believe Jesus enables people to be reconciled to God. The Nicene Creed asserts that Jesus will judge the living and the dead either before or after their bodily resurrection, an event tied to the Second Coming of Jesus in Christian eschatology. The great majority of Christians worship Jesus as the incarnation of God the Son, the second of three persons of the Trinity. A small minority of Christian denominations reject Trinitarianism, wholly or partly, as non-scriptural.

==== Druze Faith ====
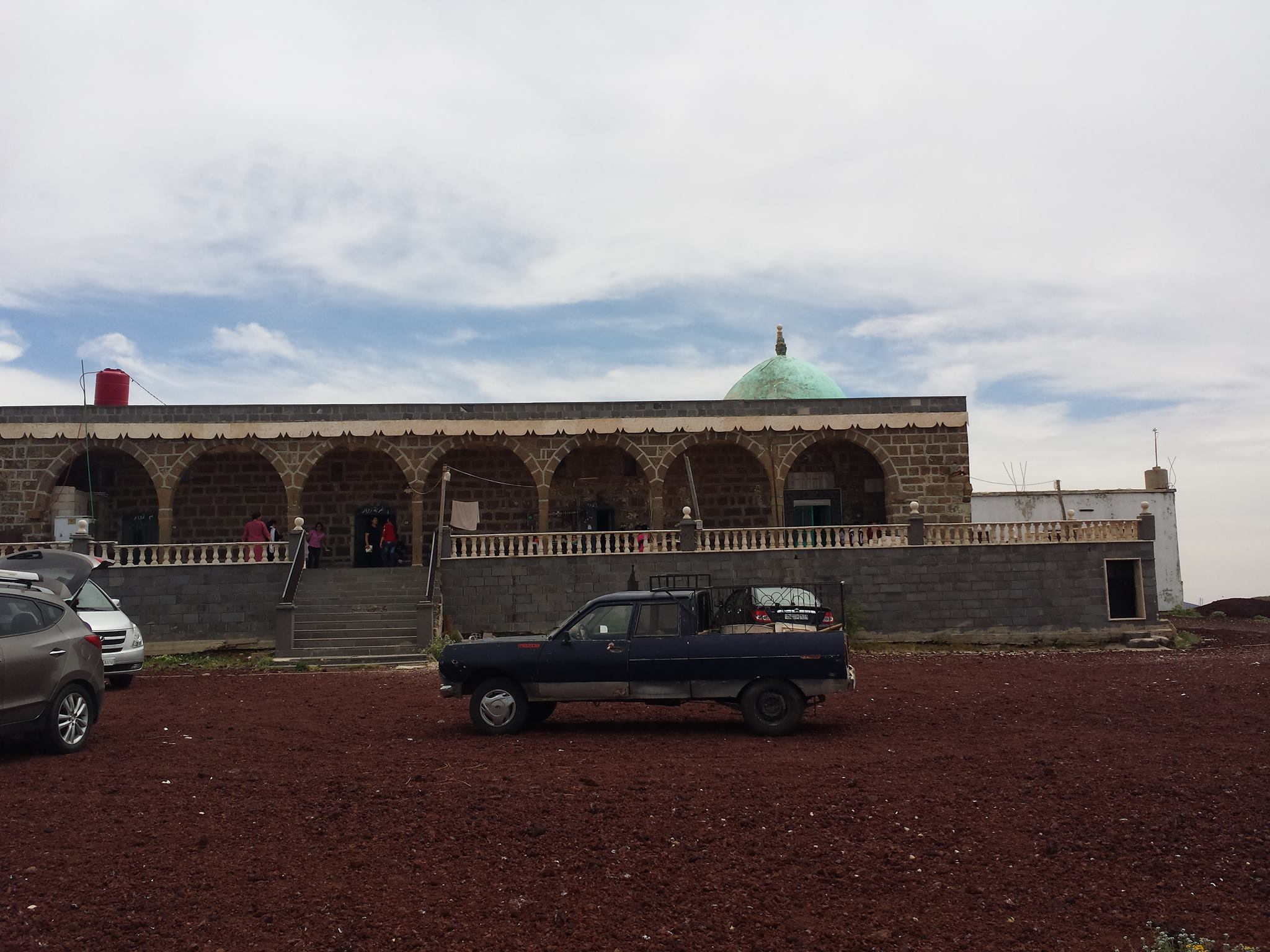
The Druze Maqam al-Masih (Jesus) in As-Suwayda Governorate

In the Druze Faith, Jesus is considered and revered as one of the seven spokesmen or prophets (natiq), defined as messengers or intermediaries between God and mankind, along with Adam, Noah, Abraham, Moses, Muhammad and Muhammad ibn Isma'il, each of them sent in a different period of history to preach the message of God. The Druze venerate Jesus "the son of Joseph and Mary" and his four disciples, who wrote the Gospels. According to the Druze manuscripts Jesus is the Greatest Imam and the incarnation of Ultimate Reason (ʿAql) on earth and the first cosmic principle (Ḥadd), and regards Jesus and Hamza ibn Ali as the incarnations of one of the five great celestial powers, who form part of their system. Druze doctrines include the beliefs that Jesus was born of a virgin named Mary, performed miracles, and died by crucifixion. Druze doctrines include that Hamza ibn Ali took Jesus down from the cross and allowed him to return to his family, to prepare men for the preaching of his religion.

In the Druze tradition, Jesus is known under three titles: the True Messiah (al-Masiḥ al-Haqq), the Messiah of all Nations (Masiḥ al-Umam), and the Messiah of Sinners. This is due, respectively, to the belief that Jesus delivered the true Gospel message, the belief that he was the Saviour of all nations, and the belief that he offers forgiveness. The Druze shrine of "Sayyidna al-Masih" (Our Lord Jesus), one of the most important religious sites for the Druze, is located on a high mountain peak in the Al-Bajjah area of As-Suwayda Governorate. According to Druze tradition, Jesus sought sanctuary on this summit and held a clandestine meeting with his disciples there.

Druze believe that Hamza ibn Ali was a reincarnation of Jesus, and that Hamza ibn Ali is the true Messiah, who directed the deeds of the Messiah Jesus "the son of Joseph and Mary", but when Jesus "the son of Joseph and Mary" strayed from the path of the true Messiah, Hamza filled the hearts of the Jews with hatred for him – and for that reason, they crucified him, according to the Druze manuscripts. Despite this, Hamza ibn Ali took him down from the cross and allowed him to return to his family, to prepare men for the preaching of his religion. In an epistle ascribed to one of the founders of Druzism, Baha al-Din al-Muqtana, probably written sometime between AD 1027 and AD 1042, accused the Jews of crucifying Jesus.

The Druze believe that each spokesmen or prophets (natiq) has a "foundation" or "guardian" who is responsible for the esoteric, interpretative law, while the spokesmen or prophets (natiq) himself presents the apparent, obligatory law. According to Druze belief, Jesus, son of Joseph and Mary, the first limit and fifth spokesman or prophet natiq, appeared and replaced Moses' law with his own, proclaiming his message and appointing Simon Peter (Sham'un al-Safa) as his foundation. He had twelve apostles who called people to worship and unify the God and to obey Jesus, considered the son of the God the Father. However, his followers did not fully understand his words and symbols.

=== Perspectives on Elijah, John the Baptist, and Saint George ===
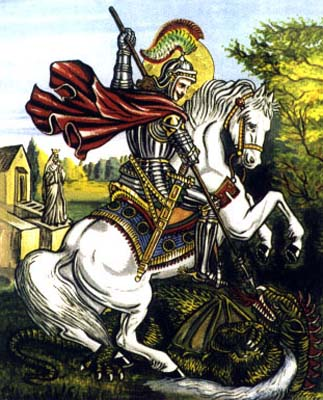
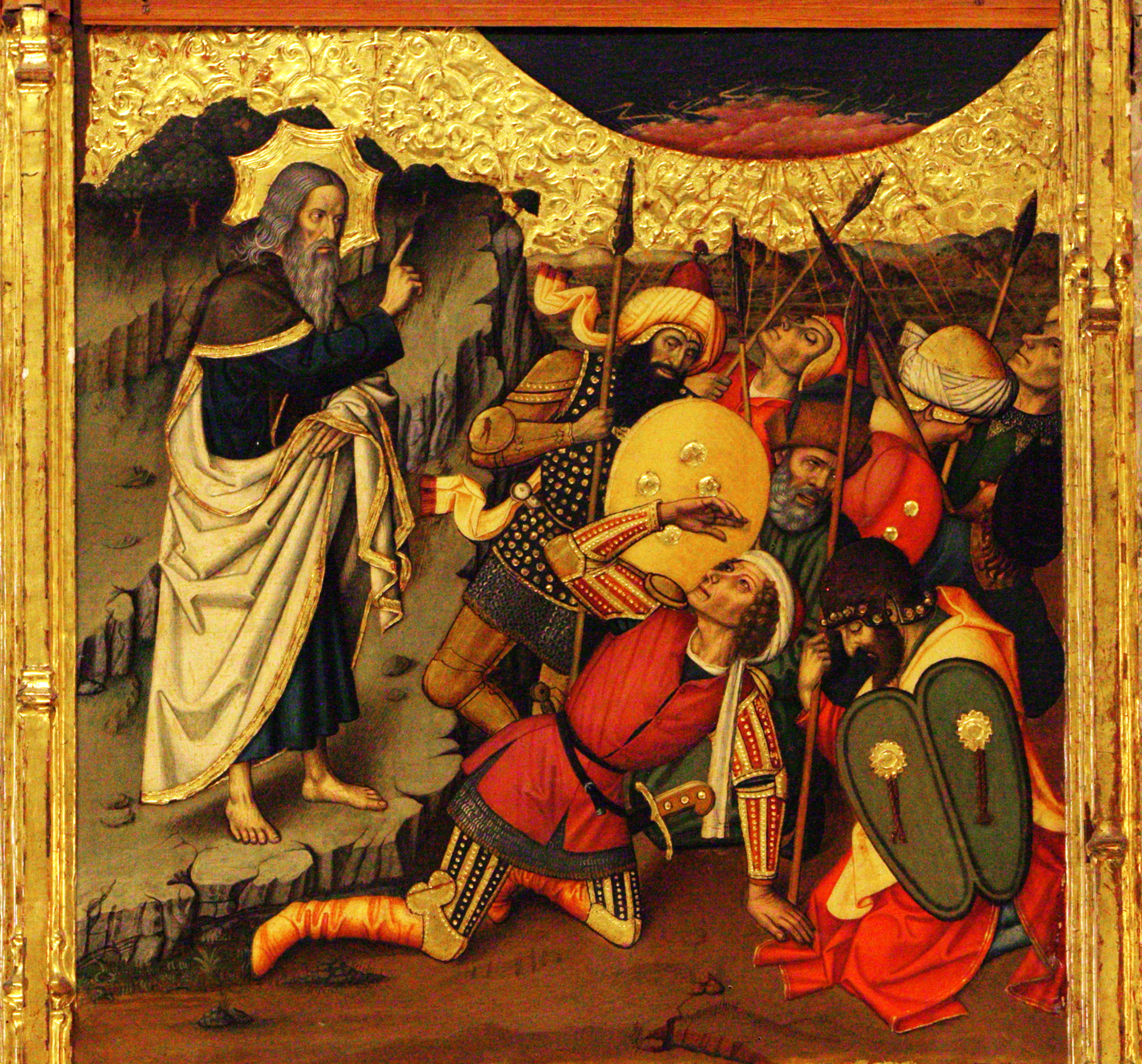
Two Christian saints favored by the Druze: Saint George (left) and Saint Elijah (right)

Both religions revere John the Baptist, Saint George, and Elijah. Druze, believe that Elijah came back as John the Baptist, or as Saint George, since they belief in reincarnation and the transmigration of the soul, Druze believe that El Khidr and John the Baptist and Saint George are one and the same. Elijah is a central figure of Druzism, and he considered patron of the Druze people.

Due to the Christian influence on the Druze faith, two Christian saints become the Druze's favorite venerated figures: Saint George and the Prophet Elijah. Thus, in all the villages inhabited by the Druze and Christians in central Mount Lebanon, a Christian church or Druze maqam is dedicated to either the Prophet Elijah or Saint George. The reverence for Saint George, who is often identified with Al-Khidr, is deeply integrated into various aspects of Druze culture and religious practices.

According to scholar Ray Jabre Mouawad, the Druze appreciated the two saints for their bravery, Saint George because he confronted the dragon and the Prophet Elijah because he competed with the pagan priests of Baal and won over them. In both cases the explanations provided by Christians are that Druzes were attracted to warrior saints that resemble their own militarized society. The Druze environment influenced in turn the Christians, and Christians living among Druze started to adopt the same word for some of their churches, using maqām instead of kanīsah (church). Saint George is seen as a guardian of the Druze community and a symbol of their enduring faith and resilience. Additionally, Saint George is regarded as a protector and healer in Druze tradition. The story of Saint George slaying the dragon is interpreted allegorically, representing the triumph of good over evil and the protection of the faithful from harm.

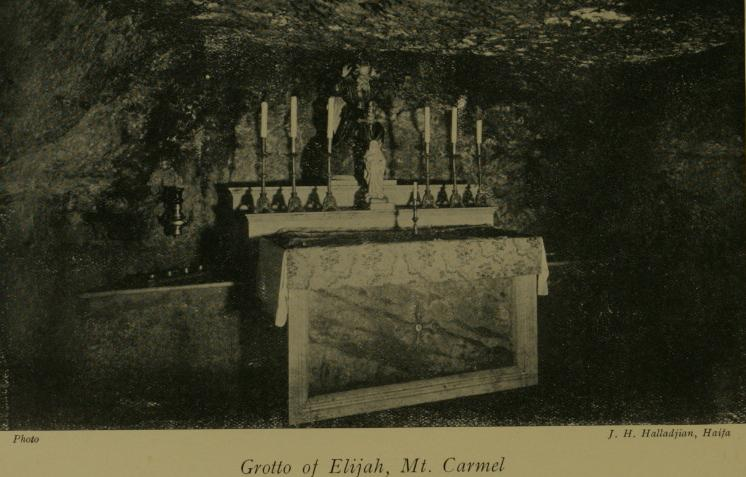
One cave associated with Elijah, Stella Maris Monastery on Mount Carmel in Haifa is venerated by Christians and Druze.

Cave of Elijah is the name used for two grottoes on Mount Carmel, in Haifa, Israel, associated with Biblical prophet Elijah. The main shrine known as the "Cave of Elijah" is located on Haifa's Allenby Road, on Mount Carmel, approximately 40 m above sea level. For centuries, it has been a destination for Jewish, Christian, Muslim and Druze pilgrims. The Cave of Elijah in Allenby Road is divided into twos sections for praying, one for men and one for women; the cave is behind a velvet curtain. The Cave is also known as el-Khader in Arabic. The Druze regard it as holy, and many among them identify Elijah as "el-Khidr", the green prophet who symbolizes water and life. The cave has been considered by some as miracle-working. Sick people are said to be brought to the Cave in hope that they will be cured. A second grotto, also associated with Elijah, is located nearby, under the altar of the main church of the Stella Maris Monastery, also on Mount Carmel.

==== Druze Faith ====
Druze tradition honors several "mentors" and "prophets", and Elijah (Khidr) is honored as a prophet. Druze venerate Elijah, and he is considered a central figure in Druzism. And due to his importance in Druzism, the settlement of Druze on Mount Carmel had partly to do with Elijah's story and devotion. There are two large Druze towns on the eastern slopes of Mount Carmel: Daliyat al-Karmel and Isfiya. The Druze regard the Cave of Elijah as holy, and identify Elijah as "El-Khidr", the green prophet who symbolizes water and life, a miracle who cures the sick.

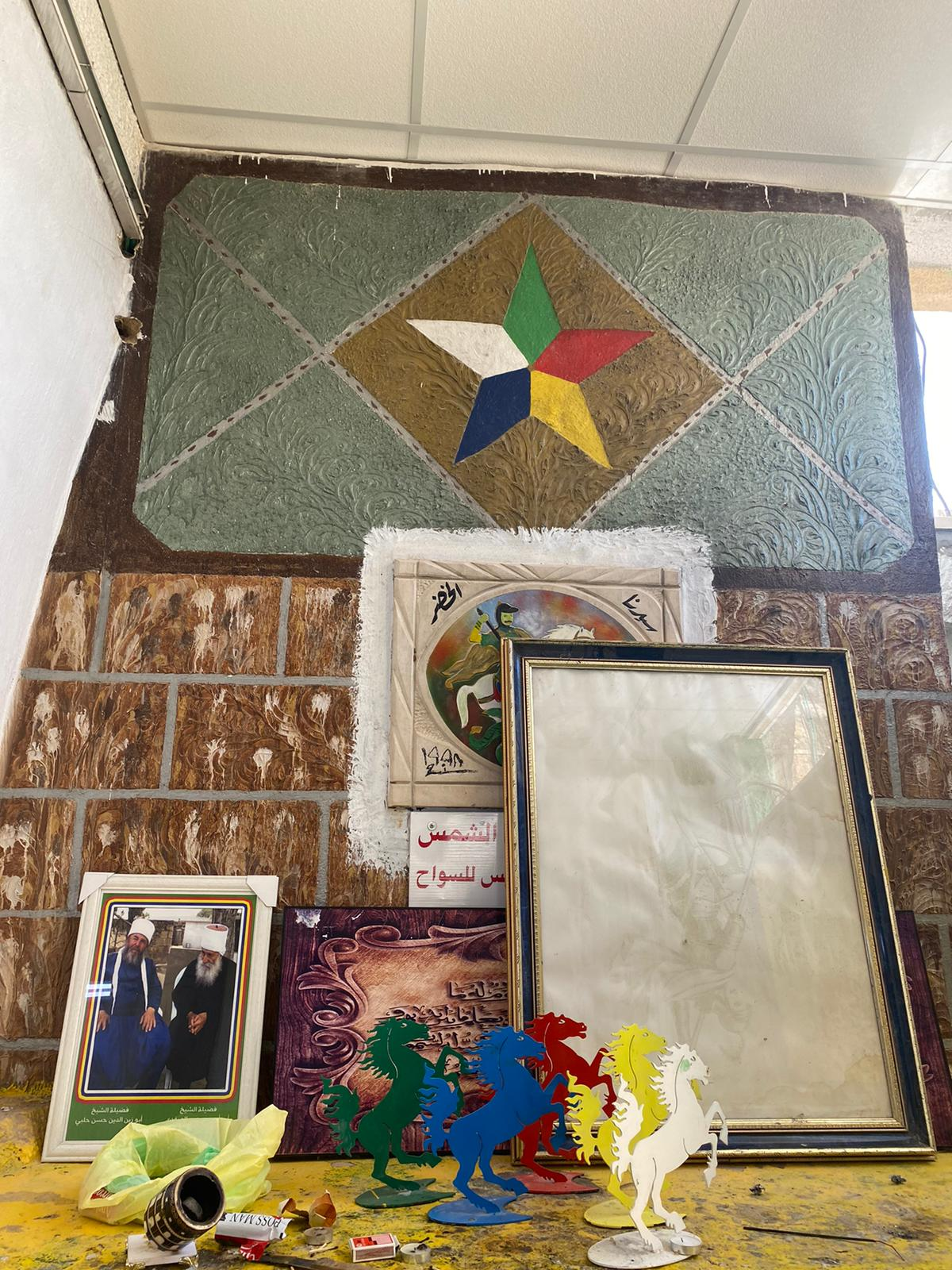
Inside the Druze maqam Al-Khidr in Kafr Yasif, Israel, there is an icon of Saint George, who has been syncretized with the figure of al-Khidr.

Druze, like some Christians, believe that Elijah came back as John the Baptist, or as Saint George, since they belief in reincarnation and the transmigration of the soul, Druze believe that El Khidr and John the Baptist are one and the same.

Saint George is described as a prophetic figure in Druze sources; and in some sources he is identified with Elijah or Mar Elias, and in others as al-Khidr. Druze believe that Elijah came back as John the Baptist and as Saint George, and the Druze version of the story of al-khidr was syncretized with the story of Saint George and the Dragon.

The shrine of al-Khidr is located in the village of Kafr Yasif near the city of Acre on the Mediterranean coast. It is considered one of the most famous shrines in Druze religion. The prophet's name is "Sidna Abu Ibrahim" and he is nicknamed Nabi Al-Khidr (the Green One). Al-Khidr is identified with Elijah the prophet and, according to Druze belief, is one of the founders of their religion. The nickname El-Khidr (the Green One) comes from the belief that his memory will always be fresh like a green plant. Ziyarat al-Nabi al-Khidr is an Israeli Druze festival called Ziyara celebrated on 25 January which is officially recognized in Israel as a public holiday for Druzes, the celebration starts on 24 January and concludes on 25 January, with many religious leaders from all the religions in Israel, and also political leaders (occasionally also the PM), coming to congratulate the Israeli Druze community during their festivities at the Maqam Al-Khidr in Kafr Yasif. Religious leaders or sheikhs from Mount Carmel, the Galilee and the Golan Heights take the opportunity to discuss religious issues.

The Cave of Elijah is a grotto that appears in the Hebrew Bible, where the prophet Elijah took shelter during a journey into the wilderness (1 Kings 19:8). The exact location of the cave is unknown. There is a "Cave of Elijah" on Mount Carmel approximately 40 m above sea level in Haifa. For centuries it has been a pilgrimage destination for Jewish, Christian, Druze, and Muslim people. Another cave associated with Elijah is located nearby, under the altar of the main church of the Stella Maris Monastery, also on Mount Carmel.

==== Christianity ====
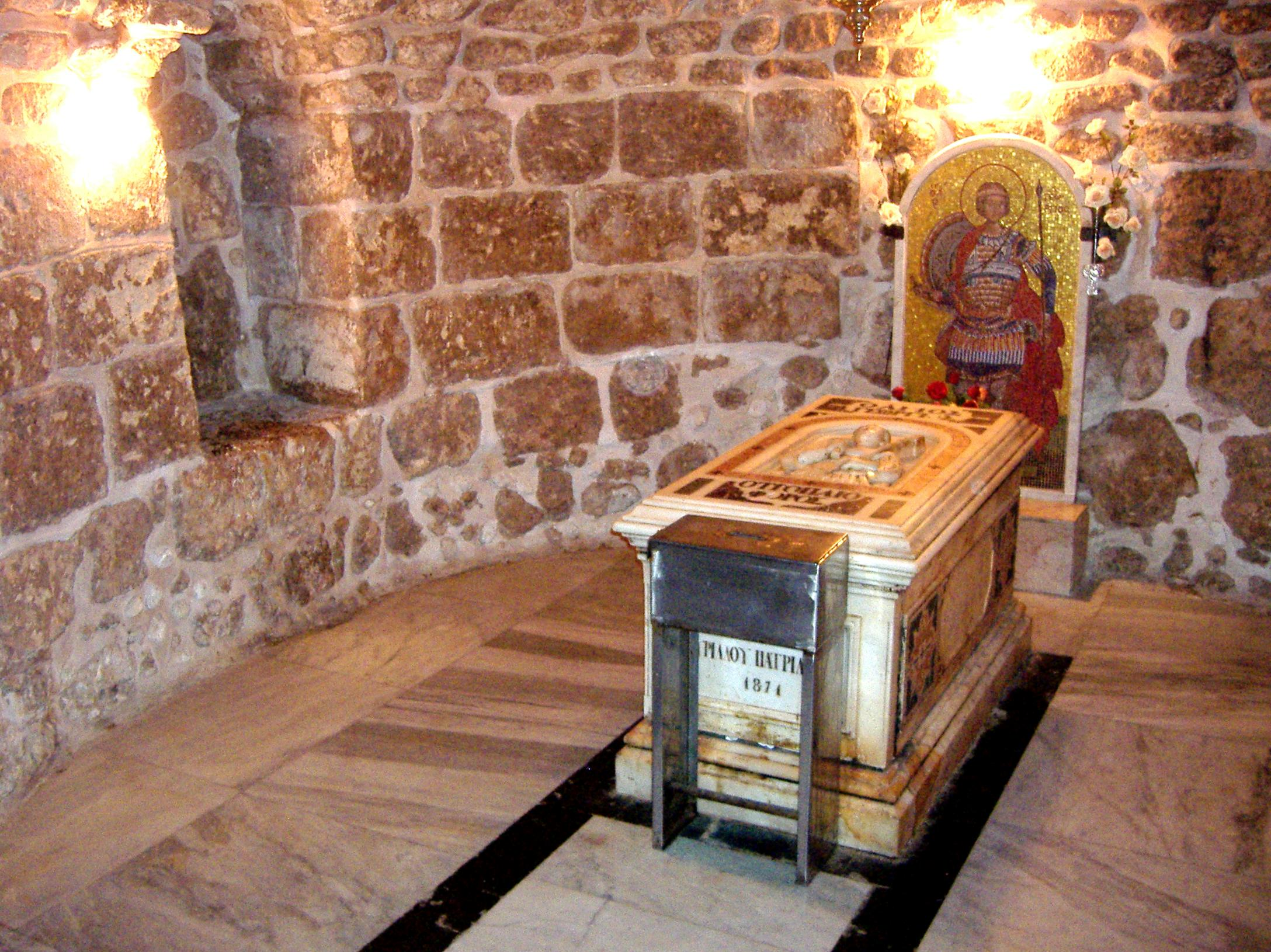
St George's Tomb in the Church of Saint George, Lod, is venerated by Christians, Muslims, and Druze.

The Christian New Testament notes that some people thought that Jesus was, in some sense, Elijah, but it also makes clear that John the Baptist is "the Elijah" who was promised to come in Malachi 3:1; 4:5. According to accounts in all three of the Synoptic Gospels, Elijah appeared with Moses during the Transfiguration of Jesus. In Western Christianity, Elijah is commemorated as a saint with a feast day on 20 July by the Roman Catholic Church and the Lutheran Church–Missouri Synod. Catholics believe that he was unmarried and celibate. In the Eastern Orthodox Church and those Eastern Catholic Churches which follow the Byzantine Rite, he is commemorated on the same date (in the 21st century, Julian Calendar 20 July corresponds to Gregorian Calendar 2 August). He is greatly revered among the Orthodox as a model of the contemplative life. He is also commemorated on the Orthodox liturgical calendar on the Sunday of the Holy Fathers (the Sunday before the Nativity of the Lord).

John the Baptist is also known as John the Forerunner in Christianity, John the Immerser in some Baptist Christian traditions, He is considered to be a prophet of God by all of these faiths, and is honoured as a saint in many Christian denominations. According to the New Testament, John anticipated a messianic figure greater than himself, and the Gospels portray John as the precursor or forerunner of Jesus, since John announces Jesus' coming and prepares the people for Jesus' ministry. Jesus himself identifies John as "Elijah who is to come", which is a direct reference to the Book of Malachi (Malachi 4:5), that has been confirmed by the angel who announced John's birth to his father, Zechariah. According to the Gospel of Luke, John and Jesus were relatives.

Saint George was a Christian who is venerated as a saint in Christianity, and he was a soldier of Cappadocian Greek origin and member of the Praetorian Guard for Roman emperor Diocletian, who was sentenced to death for refusing to recant his Christian faith. He became one of the most venerated saints and megalomartyrs in Christendom, and he has been especially venerated as a military saint since the Crusades. In hagiography, as one of the Fourteen Holy Helpers and one of the most prominent military saints, he is immortalized in the legend of Saint George and the Dragon. His memorial, Saint George's Day, is traditionally celebrated on 23 April. England, Ethiopia, Georgia, Catalonia and Aragon in Spain, Moscow in Russia, and several other states, regions, cities, universities, professions and organizations claim George as their patron. The bones of Saint George are buried in the Church of Saint George, Lod, Israel.

=== Perspectives on Mary, mother of Jesus ===
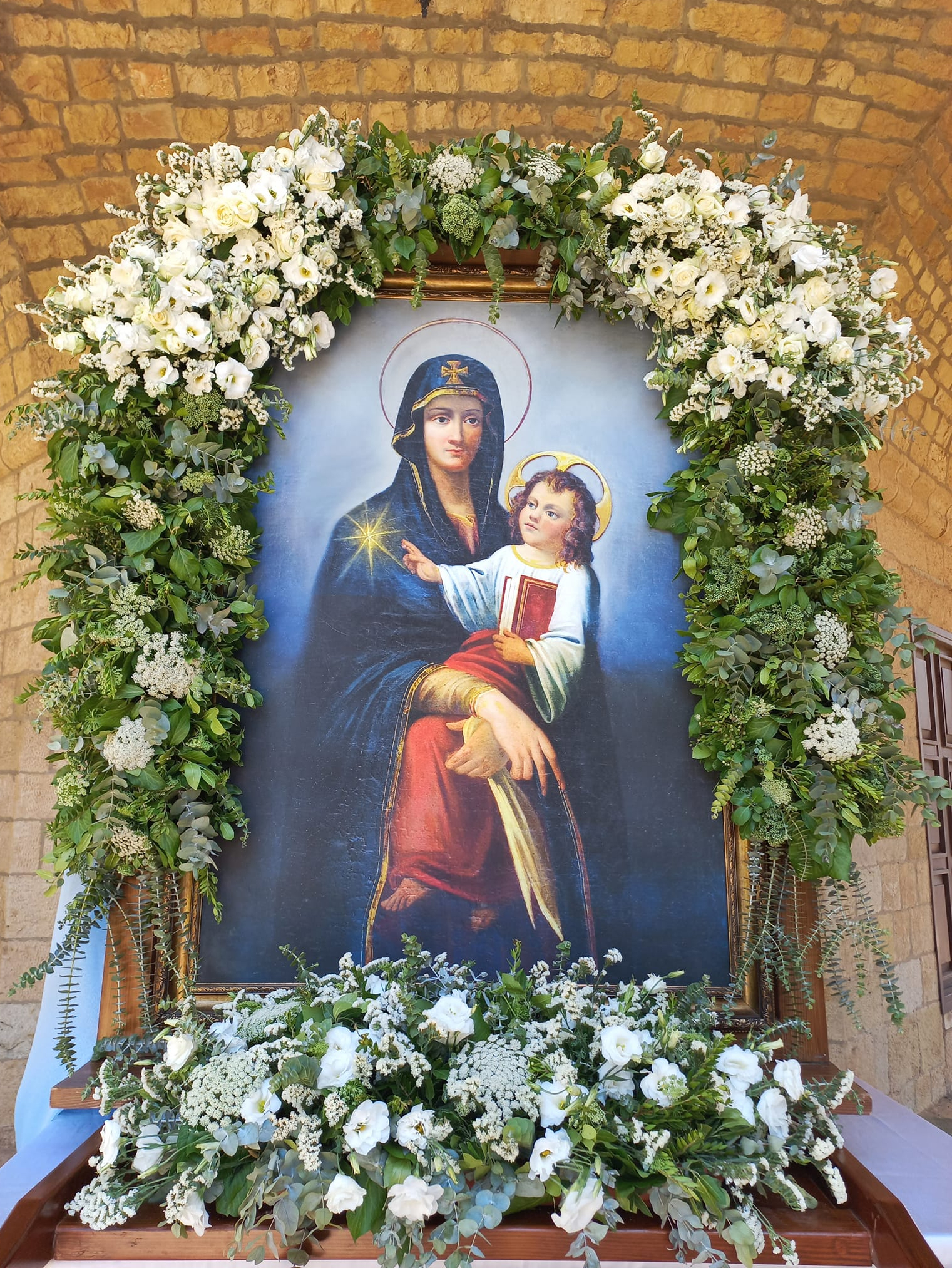
The icon of Saidet et Tallé, also known as "the Virgin of the Druze", is venerated by both the Druze and Christian communities. This veneration reflects the long-standing interfaith harmony in Lebanon.

Mary was a first-century Jewish woman of Nazareth, the wife of Joseph and the mother of Jesus. She is a central figure of Christianity, venerated under various titles such as virgin or queen, many of them mentioned in the Litany of Loreto. The Eastern and Oriental Orthodox, Church of the East, Catholic, Anglican, and Lutheran churches believe that Mary, as mother of Jesus, is the Mother of God. Other Protestant views on Mary vary, with some holding her to have lesser status. Christian Marian perspectives include a great deal of diversity. While some Christians such as Catholics and Eastern Orthodox have well established Marian traditions, Protestants at large pay scant attention to Mariological themes. Catholic, Eastern Orthodox, Oriental Orthodox, Anglican, and Lutherans venerate the Virgin Mary. This veneration especially takes the form of prayer for intercession with her Son, Jesus Christ. Additionally, it includes composing poems and songs in Mary's honor, painting icons or carving statues of her, and conferring titles on Mary that reflect her position among the saints.

The Druze faith holds the Virgin Mary, known as Sayyida Maryam, in high regard. Although the Druze religion is distinct from mainstream Islam and Christianity, it incorporates elements from both and honors many of their figures, including the Virgin Mary. The Druze revere Mary as a holy and pure figure, embodying virtue and piety. She is respected not only for her role as the mother of Messiah Jesus but also for her spiritual purity and dedication to God. In regions where Druze and Christians coexist, such as parts of Lebanon, Syria and Israel, the veneration of Mary often reflects a blend of traditions. Shared pilgrimage sites and mutual respect for places like the Church of Saidet et Tallé in Deir el Qamar, the Our Lady of Lebanon shrine in Harrisa, the Our Lady of Saidnaya Monastery in Saidnaya, and the Stella Maris Monastery in Haifa exemplify this.

Historical records and writings by authors like Pierre-Marie Martin and Glenn Bowman show that Druze leaders and community members have historically shown deep reverence for Marian sites. They often sought her intercession before battles or during times of need, demonstrating a cultural and spiritual integration of Marian veneration into their religious practices.

In Lebanon, the Virgin Mary serves as a unifying figure among Druze, Muslims, and Christians, fostering a sense of shared heritage and mutual respect. Nour Fara Haddad, a scholar of religious anthropology, states that this unity is particularly important in maintaining the social and cultural bonds between these communities.

=== Perspectives on the Gospel writers ===
In Christian tradition, the Four Evangelists are Matthew, Mark, Luke, and John, the authors attributed with the creation of the four canonical Gospel accounts. In the New Testament, they bear the following titles: the Gospel of Matthew; the Gospel of Mark; the Gospel of Luke; and the Gospel of John. These names were assigned to the works by the early church fathers in the 2nd century AD; none of the writers signed their work.

The Druze tradition honors several "mentors" and "prophets", including Matthew, Mark, Luke, and John are honored as a prophets. These Gospel writers are respected for their contributions to spiritual knowledge and guidance. Druze doctrine teaches that Christianity is to be "esteemed and praised", as the Gospel writers are regarded as "carriers of wisdom".

The number 5 holds special significance within the Druze faith, as it is believed that great prophets come in groups of five. In ancient Greek times, these prophets were represented by Pythagoras, Plato, Aristotle, Parmenides, and Empedocles. In the first century, the five were represented by Jesus, John the Baptist, Saint Matthew, Matthew, and Luke. In the time of the faith's foundation, the five were Hamza ibn Ali ibn Ahmad, Muḥammad ibn Wahb al-Qurashī, Abū'l-Khayr Salama ibn Abd al-Wahhab al-Samurri, Ismāʿīl ibn Muḥammad at-Tamīmī, and Al-Muqtana Baha'uddin.

=== Perspectives on Jethro ===
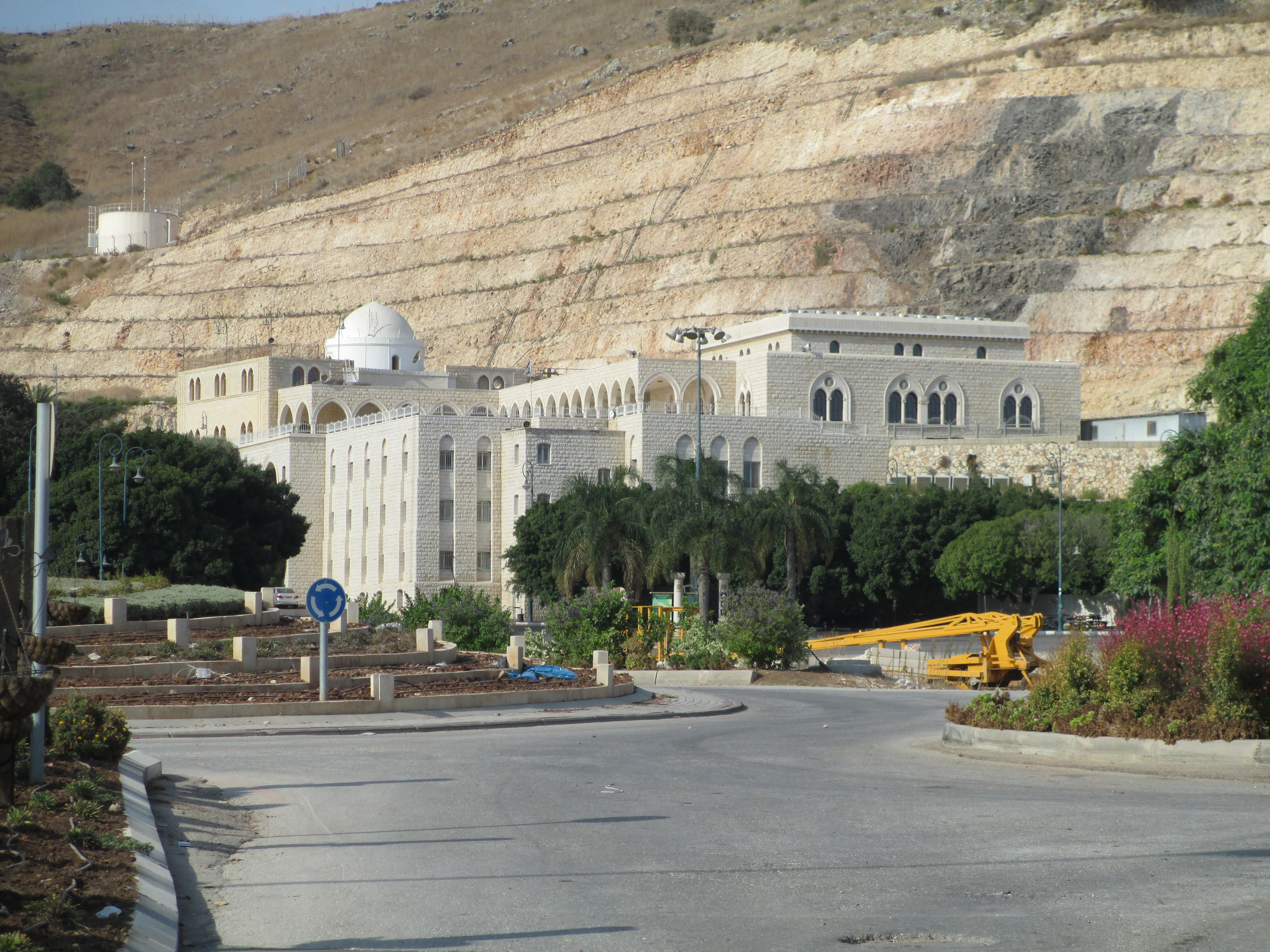
The complex of Maqam Nabi Shu'ayb hosting the tomb of Shuaib

In the Old Testament, Jethro was Moses' father-in-law, a Kenite shepherd and priest of Midian, sometimes called Reuel (or Raguel). In Exodus, Moses' father-in-law is initially referred to as "Reuel" (Exodus 2:18) but afterwards as "Jethro" (Exodus 3:1). He was also identified as the father of Hobab in Numbers 10:29, though Judges 4:11 identifies him as Hobab.

Muslim scholars and the Druze identify Jethro with the prophet Shuayb, also said to come from Midian. For the Druze, Shuayb is considered the most important prophet, and the ancestor of all Druze. They believe he was a "hidden" and "true prophet" who communicated directly with God and then passed on that knowledge to Moses, whom they describe as a "recognised" and "revealed prophet". According to Druze belief, Moses was allowed to wed Zipporah, the daughter of Jethro, after helping save his daughters and their flock from competing herdsmen.

Nabi Shuʿayb is the site recognized by Druze as the tomb of Shuʿayb. It is located at Hittin in the Lower Galilee and is the holiest shrine and most important pilgrimage site for the Druze.

== Christian influence on Druze faith ==
The Druze star; the first limit (green), representing either Hamza ibn Ali or Jesus

Some scholars suggest that early Christian Gnostic beliefs might have influenced Druze theology, particularly in concepts of divine knowledge and reincarnation. Some suggest that the Druze practice of religious secrecy and asceticism may have been influenced by the monastic traditions of Christianity, particularly Eastern Christian monasticism prevalent in the Levant region. These influences and incorporations of Christian elements encompass the adoption of the concept of Christianizing al-Mahdi's persona among the Druze, as well as the integration of verses from the Bible concerning the Messiah by certain Druze preachers. Modern Western scholars such as de Sacy, van Vloten, and Goldziher have highlighted the Messianic tendencies and the influence of Christian incarnation in the theology of early Druze founders as fundamental aspects of their doctrine.

Scholar Rami İbrahim Mahmut from Istanbul University argues that early Christian elements are clearly evident in the Druze faith. For instance, the concept of a Christian-Mahdi figure was adopted by the Druze, and some Gospel citations originally referring to Jesus were applied to the Druze preacher Hamza ibn Ali. These texts were used to claim that he is the Messiah to be obeyed by Christians. This belief also extends to al-Hakim, whom some Druze believe will return as Christ to initiate the resurrection. The Druze deify al-Hākim bi-Amr Allāh, attributing to him divine qualities similar to those Christians attribute to Jesus.

Some scholars believe Christian elements are deeply embedded in Druze beliefs, introduced through Isma'ili traditions. This is evident in the Druze creed, which deifies al-Hākim bi Amrillāh. The initiation text, "Mīthāq Walī al-Zamān" (Pact of Time Custodian), which begins with, "I rely on our Moula Al-Hakim the lonely God, the individual, the eternal,... Obedience of almighty Moulana Al-Hākim, exalted be him and that obedience is worship and that he does not have any partners ever, present or coming", closely resembles Christian beliefs about Jesus' divinity. The Druze also view figures like Jesus, al-Hākim bi Amrillāh, and Hamza ibn Ali as the Messiah or Mahdi. They believe al-Hākim will return at the end of times to judge the world and establish his kingdom, while Hamza ibn Ali is considered a reincarnation of Jesus, the Universal Mind 'Aql, closely associated with al-Hākim.

Druze doctrine regards Christianity, Judaism, and Islam as preceding religions that embody different manifestations of Druzism, which they consider superior to all. According to Druze beliefs, Adam and Jesus hold a unique status among prophets, sharing in divine essence. The Druze conception of Jesus ('Īsa ibn-Yūsuf) differs somewhat from the portrayal in the New Testament; he resembles the Muslim interpretation of Jesus as envisioned by the ancient Docetae sect, who believed that Christ suffered only in appearance.

Christian influences are evident in the writings of the Druze missionary Baha al-Din al-Muqtana (d. 1042). In a letter to Emperor Constantine of Byzantium, he cited passages from the Gospel of John, such as, "His mother saith unto the servants, Whatsoever he saith unto you, do it", and "Jesus replied, this is the miracle I will do for you: Destroy this sanctuary and in three days I will raise it up". Baha al-Din interpreted these "three days" symbolically, suggesting they represent the return of Christ, whom he identified as Hamza ibn Ali. He attributed many aspects of Christ's role to Hamzah in Ali, including titles like the Holy Spirit and the Son of God, and claimed Hamzah ibn Ali as the one who sent the apostles Matthew, Mark, Luke, and John. Bahā'-al-Dīn confuses John the Evangelist with John the Baptist and John Chrysostom in his writings. Additionally, he employed parables that echoed themes found in the New Testament.

Some scholars suggest that certain Druze religious practices were influenced by Eastern Christian monastic traditions, particularly asceticism. It is not uncommon for a sheikh to request celibacy from his fiancée, and many Druze sheikhs (ʻUqqāl) remain unmarried throughout their lives. Other Christian influences can be seen in the Druze religion, such as sexual attitudes that align more closely with Christianity than with Islam. The Druze rejection of polygamy, in contrast to traditional Islamic practices, underscores this alignment with Christian law. According to the scholar Francis Crawford Burkitt, in their family life, the Druze strictly observe monogamous marriages influenced by Christian norms, although divorce is readily accepted.

The Druze strictly avoid iconography, but use five colors ("Five Limits" خمس حدود khams ḥudūd) as a religious symbol: green, red, yellow, blue, and white. The First limit (green), identified by Ismail at-Tamimi (d. 1030) in the Epistle of the Candle, represents either Hamza Ibn Ali or Jesus, symbolizing the "Universal Mind/Intelligence/Nous".

== Religious text ==
=== Christian elements in the Epistles of Wisdom ===
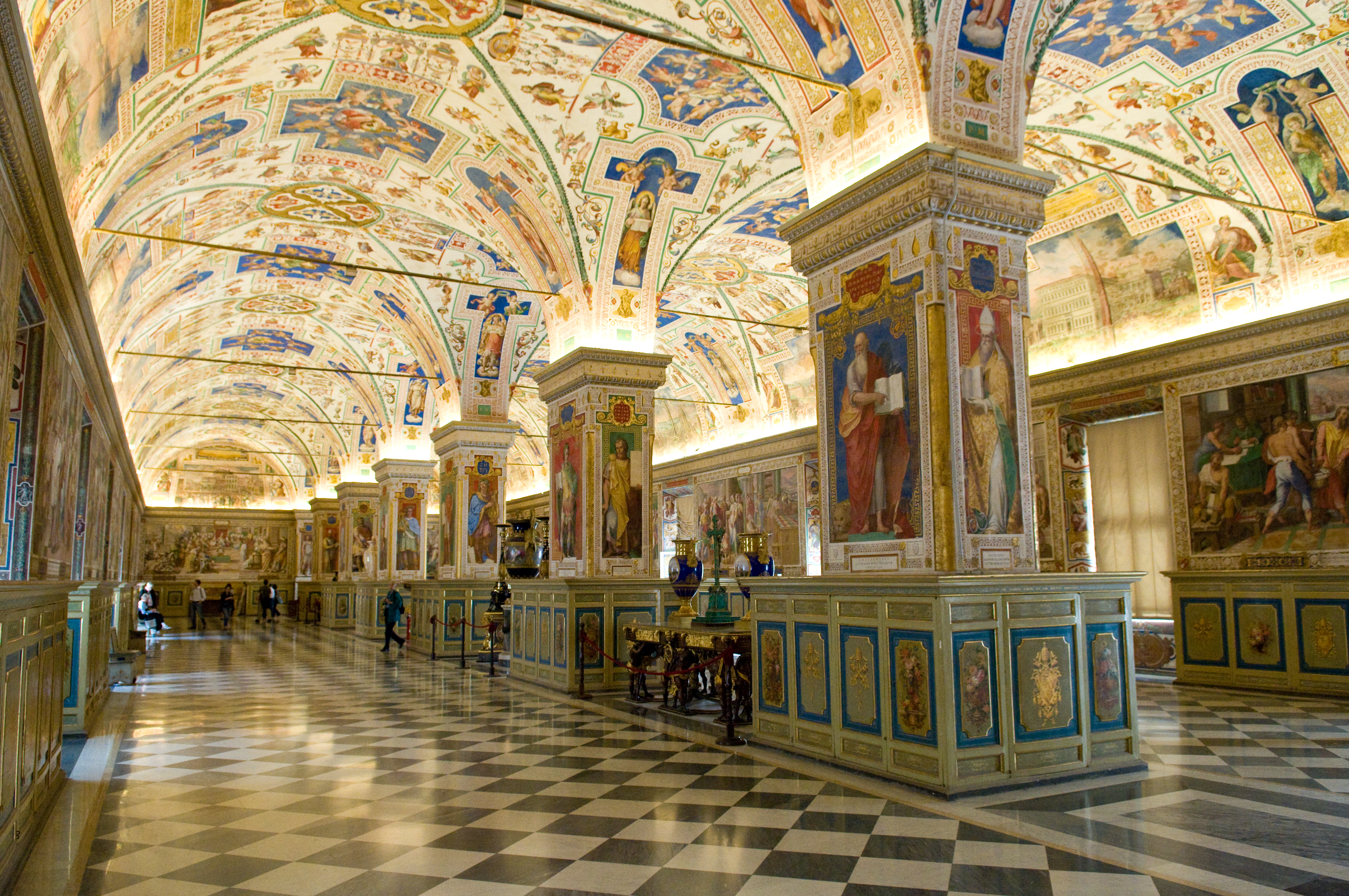
The Vatican Library possesses a collection of Druze manuscripts.

The Epistles of Wisdom or Rasa'il al-Hikmah is a corpus of sacred texts and pastoral letters by teachers of the Druze Faith, the full Druze canon or Druze scripture includes the Old Testament, the New Testament, the Quran and philosophical works by Plato and those influenced by Socrates among works from other religions and philosophers. Most of the Epistles of Wisdom are written in a post-classical language, often showing similarities to Arab Christian authors. The texts provide formidable insight into the incorporation of the Universal Intellect and the soul of the world in 11th century Egypt, when the deity showed itself to men through Fatimid Caliph al-Hakim and his doctrines. These display a notable form of Arabic Neoplatonism blended with Ismailism and adopted Christian elements of great interest for the philosophy and history of religions. The Epistles of Wisdom shows influence of Christian monasticism, among other religious practices.

A Christian Syrian physician gave one of the first Druze manuscripts to Louis XIV in 1700, which is now kept in the Bibliothèque Nationale. Local disturbances such as the invasion of Ibrahim Pasha between 1831 and 1838, along with the 1860 Lebanon conflict caused some of these texts to fall into the hands of academics. Other original manuscripts are held in the Robert Garrett collection at Princeton University. The first French translation was published in 1838 by linguist and Catholic orientalist Antoine Isaac, Baron Silvestre de Sacy in Expose de la religion des Druzes.

Antoine Isaac Silvestre de Sacy, a fervently Catholic linguist and orientalist, delved into the Druze religion. His final and incomplete work, was the Exposé de la religion des Druzes (2 vols., 1838), focused on this subject. The Vatican Library houses several Druze manuscripts, primarily volumes of the Epistles of Wisdom or Rasa'il al-Hikmah, in copies backing to the 10th and 11th centuries.

=== Druze perspective on Christianity ===
The Epistles of Wisdom present a unique perspective on religions and philosophies, including Christianity and Islam, offering insights and interpretations that reflect the beliefs and teachings of the Druze faith. These epistles delve into various aspects of Christianity, including the role of Jesus, the Gospel writers, and Christian doctrine. They also address Christian scriptures and teachings from the perspective of Druze theology, highlighting points of convergence and divergence between the two faiths. Overall, the Epistles of Wisdom provide offer an examination of religions and philosophies, including Christianity and Islam, from the viewpoint of Druze philosophy and spirituality.

Christian-friendly content is present in Druze literature, such as the Epistles of Wisdom. In epistles 53–55 of the third volume, it teaches that Christianity should be "esteemed and praised" by Druze believers, with the four evangelists being described as "carriers of wisdom". Another epistle mentions that al-Hakim bi-Amr Allah will judge humanity on Yom ed-Din, the "Last Judgment", which will occur after the overthrow of all kings, the prevalence of Christianity over Islam, the destruction of Mecca by fire, and the rise of a vast army of reincarnated Druze individuals to rule the world. According to this belief, only four religious communities will survive this judgment: Ahl al-Tawhīd [the Druze], Jews, Christians, and those who were once Muslims but have since abandoned Islam. Muslims will then serve the favored four communities, while faithful Druze believers will be appointed as leaders. In his numerous epistles addressed to Christians, Bahā'-al-Dīn frequently refers to them as "saints" and "assemblies of saints". His writings also show a remarkable familiarity with the New Testament and Christian liturgy.

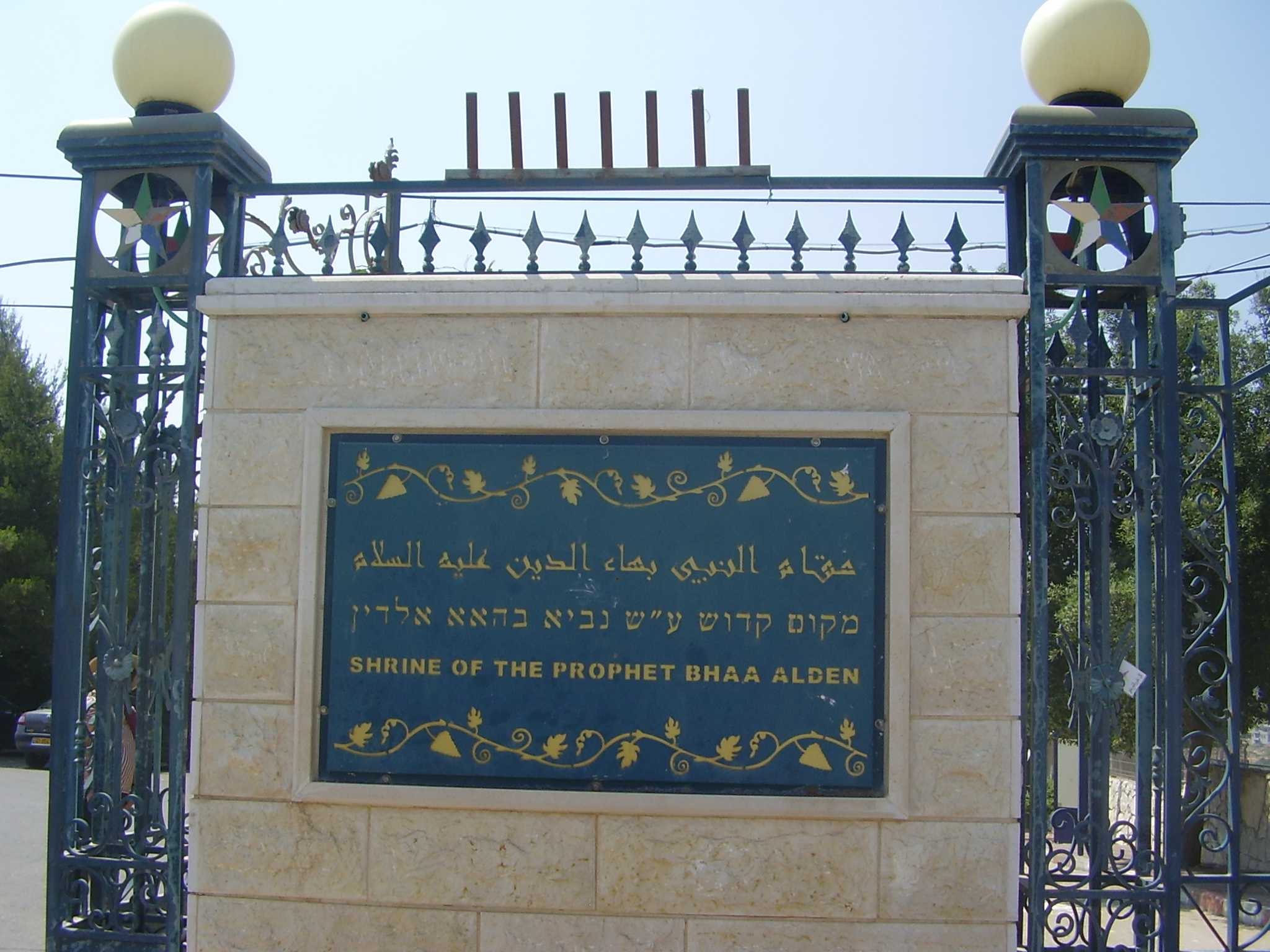
Shrine of Baha al-Din, the author of the epistles that form part of the Epistles of Wisdom books, and there is speculation that he may have originally been a Christian.

The third volume of the Epistles of Wisdom, known as "Part One", contains several epistles and discussions that offer insights into the Druze perspective on Christian beliefs and Christians. These include: "The Epistle Addressed to Constantinople, Delivered to Constantinople, the Ruler of Christianity": Authored by Baha al-Din al-Muqtana, this epistle was sent to the Emperor of the Byzantine Empire, between 1028 and 1029. In this epistle, he invites the emperor and his people to embrace the Druze religion or the divine call, In this epistle, he addresses the emperor and senior Christian clergy in Byzantium with courtesy, referring to them as saints. He seeks to align Druze beliefs more closely with Christian beliefs, aiming to demonstrate that the Paraclete, who announced the coming of the Messiah Jesus son of Mary, is the same as Hamza bin Ali. "The Epistle Entitled Christianity and the Mother of Asceticism": Baha al-Din al-Muqtana directed this letter to all Christians, affirming that Hamza ibn Ali is the reincarnation of Jesus in the present era, and indeed, he is also the true Messiah. "The Epistle Tracking and Seeking the Opinions of What Remains of the Christian Law": Baha'u'llah addressed this epistle to Prince Michael, the son-in-law of the Emperor of the Byzantine Empire. In this epistle, he interprets Gospel verses in alignment with the deification of al-Hakim bi-Amr Allah. According to scholars, these epistles demonstrate familiarity with Christian theology and Christian literature.

Epistles 13–14 of the first part of the Epistles of Wisdom focus on Jesus, detailing his ministry, his crucifixion by the Jews, and his descent from the cross. According to these epistles, Hamza bin Ali took him down from the cross and allowed him to return to his family, with the aim of preparing people to preach his religion. The epistle titled "Excuses and Warnings" foretells that, as a sign of the end times, Messiah Jesus "the son of Joseph and Mary", will appear in Egypt. The Jews will seize control of Jerusalem and seek revenge on the inhabitants of both Jerusalem and Acre. Subsequently, Messiah Jesus will expel the Jews from Jerusalem, and Christians will dominate Muslims until the Day of Judgment, when the divine Al-Hakim bi-Amr Allah returns to judge humanity.

The author of the epistle "The Report of the Jewish and Christians" (Khabar al-Yahud wal Nasara), part of first volume of the Epistles of Wisdom, appears to have been a Druze individual. The account itself identifies him as Hamza ibn Ali, a supporter of al-Hakim's divinity and the founder of the Druze faith. Hamza ibn Ali reportedly died after al-Hakim's disappearance in 1021. In the 18th century, the Orientalist Jean Michel de Venture de Paradis mentioned obtaining a manuscript discovered in a Druze village. This manuscript contained, among other things, a description of a dialogue between al-Hakim and leaders of the Christian and Jewish communities. Additionally, it included eight letters written by al-Hakim's lieutenant, Hamza ibn Ali, with the final one titled "The Report of the Jewish and Christians". These details raise the possibility that the work was authored by a supporter of al-Hakim. However, without further investigation, the matter remains unsettled. "The Report of the Jewish and Christians" (Khabar al-Yahud wal Nasara) recounts how a delegation of Jewish and Christian representatives in Cairo, led by their religious leaders, approached Caliph al-Hakim bi-Amr Allah during one of his habitual nocturnal walks to request safety due to his policy against Christians and Jews. This encounter led to a religious debate between them. According to scholar, this meeting seems to be entirely fictional, created to support the idea that both Jews and Christians were expecting the coming of al-Hakim and Hamzah ibn Ali.

Baha al-Din al-Muqtana is one of the founders of the Druze religion. Al-Muqtana's epistles comprise four of the six books of the Druze scripture, the Epistles of Wisdom. Al-Muqtana's life is largely unknown, apart from the information contained in his own writings. His name was Abu al-Hasan Ali ibn Ahmad, and he was born in the village of Sammuqa, near Aleppo in northern Syria. The familiarity with Christian theology and Christian literature exhibited in his writings suggests that he may have been originally a Christian.

His numerous epistles show the extent of the Druze missionary network, which appears to have been present almost everywhere where the Fatimid-sponsored Isma'ili daʿwa was also active: Cairo and Upper Egypt, Syria, Upper Mesopotamia and Lower Mesopotamia, Persia, the Yemen, and the Hijaz. He even sent letters to the ruler of Multan, the Byzantine emperors Constantine VII and Michael IV the Paphlagonian, Jewish communities and Christian Church leaders, as well as the leader of the Qarmatians of Bahrayn, either admonishing them for having abandoned the true faith, or exhorting them to repent and convert before the imminent end times.

== History ==
Throughout history, the remarkable aspect of the Druze is their ability to preserve their land and unique identity amidst the geopolitical turbulence. Despite the upheavals, they have not only survived but also coexisted alongside Sunni and Shiite Muslims, Christians, and Jews, maintaining their cultural heritage amidst diverse neighbors. In its emergence and evolution from Muslim soil, Druze doctrine maintained a significant relationship with Christianity, drawing from its historic connections with Christianity and Oriental Christian sects. Additionally, Druze belief inherited aspects from various Isma'ili, Zoroastrian and Judaeo-Christian sects, along with incorporating teachings from Islamic, Hellenistic, and Persian philosophies. These findings are consistent with the Druze oral tradition that claims that the adherents of the faith came from diverse ancestral lineages stretching back tens of thousands of years. The Shroud of Turin analysis shows significant traces of mitochondrial DNA unique to the Druze community.

Historically the relationship between the Druze and Christians has been characterized by harmony and coexistence, with amicable relations between the two groups prevailing throughout history, marked by shared economic activities, cultural exchange, and even political alliances in some cases, with the exception of some periods, including 1860 Mount Lebanon civil war.

According to scholar Pinḥas Artzi of Bar-Ilan University:

"Europeans who visited the area during this period related that the Druze "love the Christians more than the other believers", and that they "hate the Turks, the Muslims and the Arabs [Bedouin] with an intense hatred".

Conversely, the relationship between the Druze and Muslims has been characterized by intense persecution. Meanwhile, interactions between Jews and Druze were rare before the establishment of Israel in 1948, as they historically lived isolated from each other.

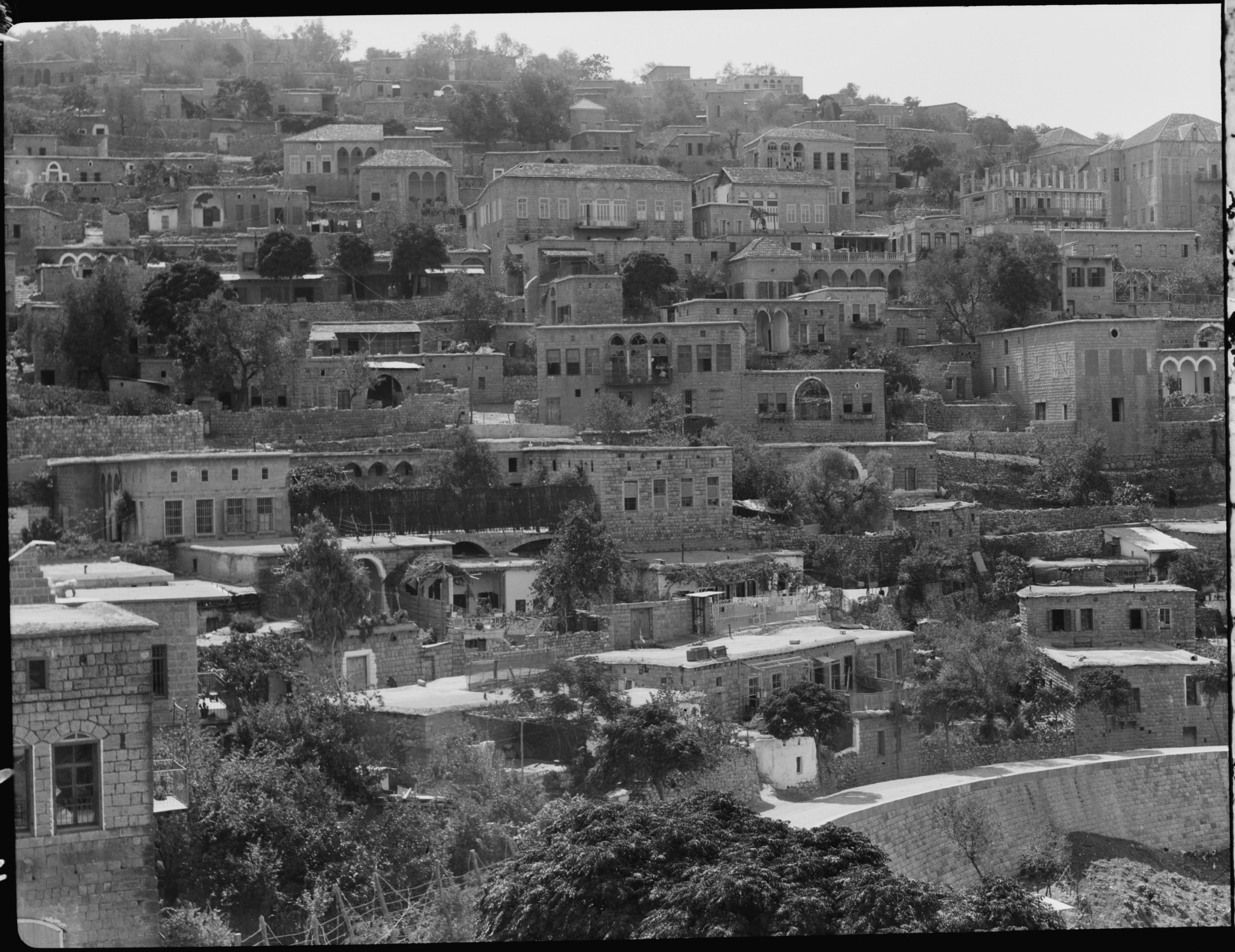
Hasbaya in Wadi al-Taym: a town with a mixed population of Druze and Christians

The Druze faith extended to many areas in the Middle East, but most of the modern Druze can trace their origin to the Wadi al-Taym in Southern Lebanon, which is named after an Arab tribe Taym Allah (or Taym Allat) which, according to Islamic historian al-Tabari, first came from the Arabian Peninsula into the valley of the Euphrates where they had been Christianized prior to their migration into Lebanon.

Many of the Druze feudal families, whose genealogies have been preserved by the two modern Syrian chroniclers Haydar al-Shihabi and Ahmad Faris al-Shidyaq, seem also to point in the direction of this origin. Arabian tribes emigrated via the Persian Gulf and stopped in Iraq on their route that would later to lead them to Syria. The first feudal Druze family, the Tanukhids, which made for itself a name in fighting the Crusaders was, according to Haydar al-Shihabi, an Arab tribe from Mesopotamia where it occupied the position of a ruling family and apparently was Christianized.

Until the Christian Crusaders arrived in the Holy Land in 1099, there is scant recorded history of the Druze. However, when they do emerge in accounts of the Christian occupation of the Levant, they are depicted as fierce warriors dedicated to repelling the Crusader armies. In the 17th century, there was a prevailing belief in France that the Druze were descendants of a lost army of European Christian crusaders. According to this notion, after the fall of the Christian stronghold of Acre in 1291 and the subsequent persecution by the victorious Mamluks, these crusaders sought refuge in the mountains of Lebanon and settled there permanently.

The only early Arab historian who mentions the Druze is the eleventh century Christian scholar Yahya of Antioch, who clearly refers to the heretical group created by ad-Darazī, rather than the followers of Hamza ibn 'Alī. Yahya of Antioch was a Melkite Christian physician and historian of the 11th century. He was most likely born in Fatimid Egypt. He became a physician, but the anti-Christian policies of Caliph Al-Hakim bi-Amr Allah (r. 996–1021) forced him to flee to Byzantine-held Antioch. The life of Hamza ibn Ali and his exact role in the birth of the Druze movement are not entirely clear, as the chief sources about him—the contemporary Christian chronicler Yahya of Antioch, the Muslim historian Ibn Zafir, and Hamza's own epistles—are often contradictory.

=== Wadi al-Taym ===
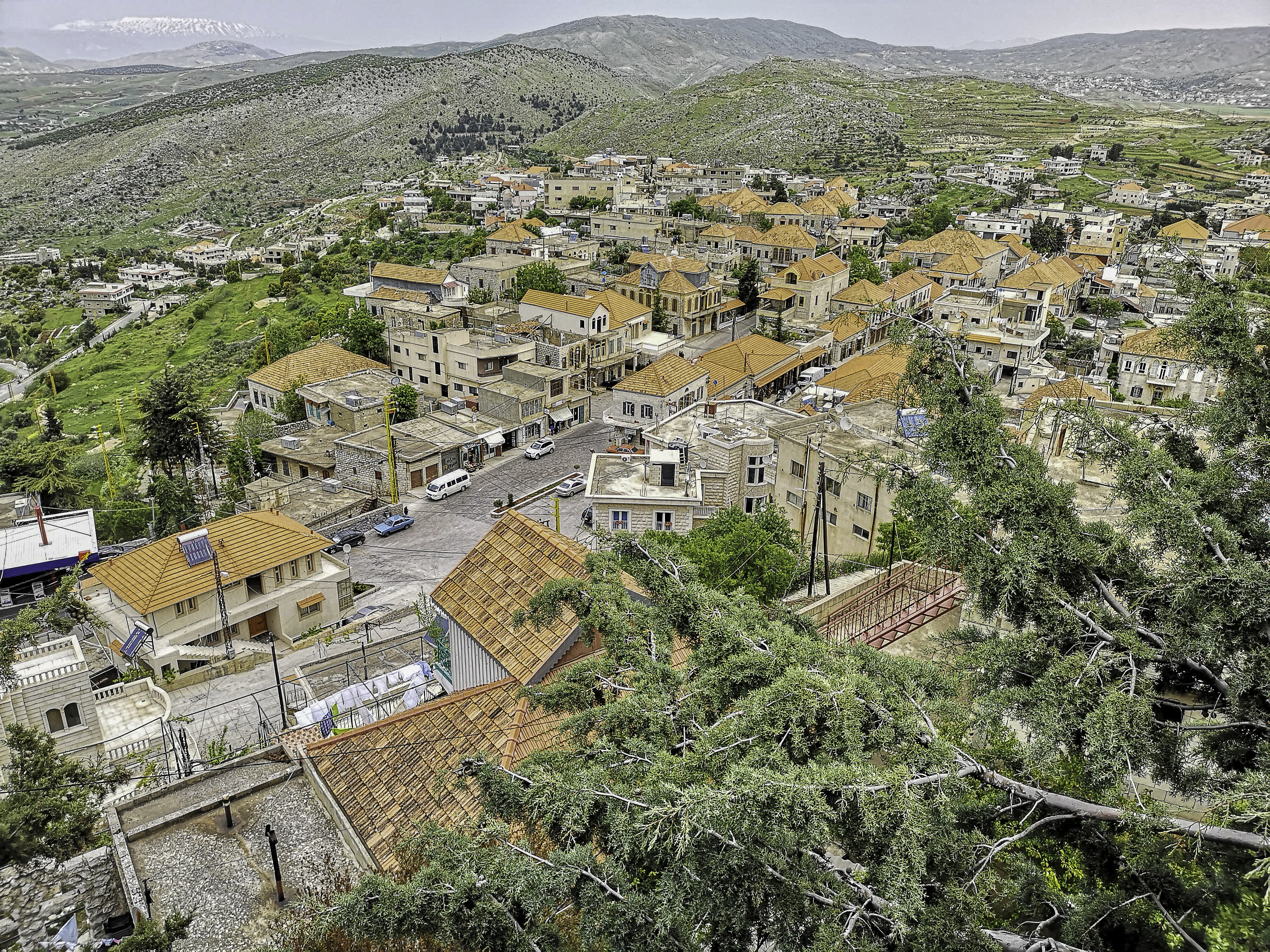
Rashaya in Wadi al-Taym: a town with a mixed population of Druze and Christians

Wadi al-Taym is named after the Arab tribe of Taym Allat (later Taym-Allah) ibn Tha'laba. The Taym-Allat entered the Euphrates Valley and adopted Christianity in the pre-Islamic period before ultimately embracing Islam after the 7th-century Muslim conquests. A small proportion of the tribe took up abode in the Wadi al-Taym at some point during the first centuries of Muslim rule. The Taym Allah, and the largely Christian, core tribes of the Lahazim in general, appear to have fought against the Muslim conquests of eastern Arabia in the Ridda wars (632–633) and the lower Euphrates in modern Iraq afterward. They embraced Monophysite Christianity, like many Bakrites, before the advent of Islam in the 620s–630s.

This valley became one of the first places where the heterodox Druze faith, which branched out of Isma'ili Shia Islam, took root in the 11th century. The Wadi al-Taym was the first area where the Druze appeared in the historical record under the name "Druze". According to many of the genealogical traditions of the Druze feudal families, the feudal Druze clans claimed descent from Arab tribes originally based in eastern Arabia and which entered Syria after periods of settlement in the Euphrates Valley. According to the historian Nejla Abu-Izzedin, "ethnically", the "Wadi al-Taym has been authoritatively stated to be one of the most Arab regions of [geographical] Syria". The area was one of the two most important centers of Druze missionary activity in the 11th century. Wadi al-Taym is generally considered the "birthplace of the Druze faith".

For much of the early 12th century, the Wadi al-Taym and the southern Chouf were the territory of the Jandal, a Druze clan. The leader of the clan, Dahhak ibn Jandal allied with the Crusaders of the Kingdom of Jerusalem and engaged in a feud with the Assassins who ruled the Banias fortress in the western foothills of Mount Hermon just south of Wadi al-Taym. Today, the population in the area being predominantly Druze and Sunni, with a high number of Christians, mostly Greek Orthodox.

=== Tanukhids ===
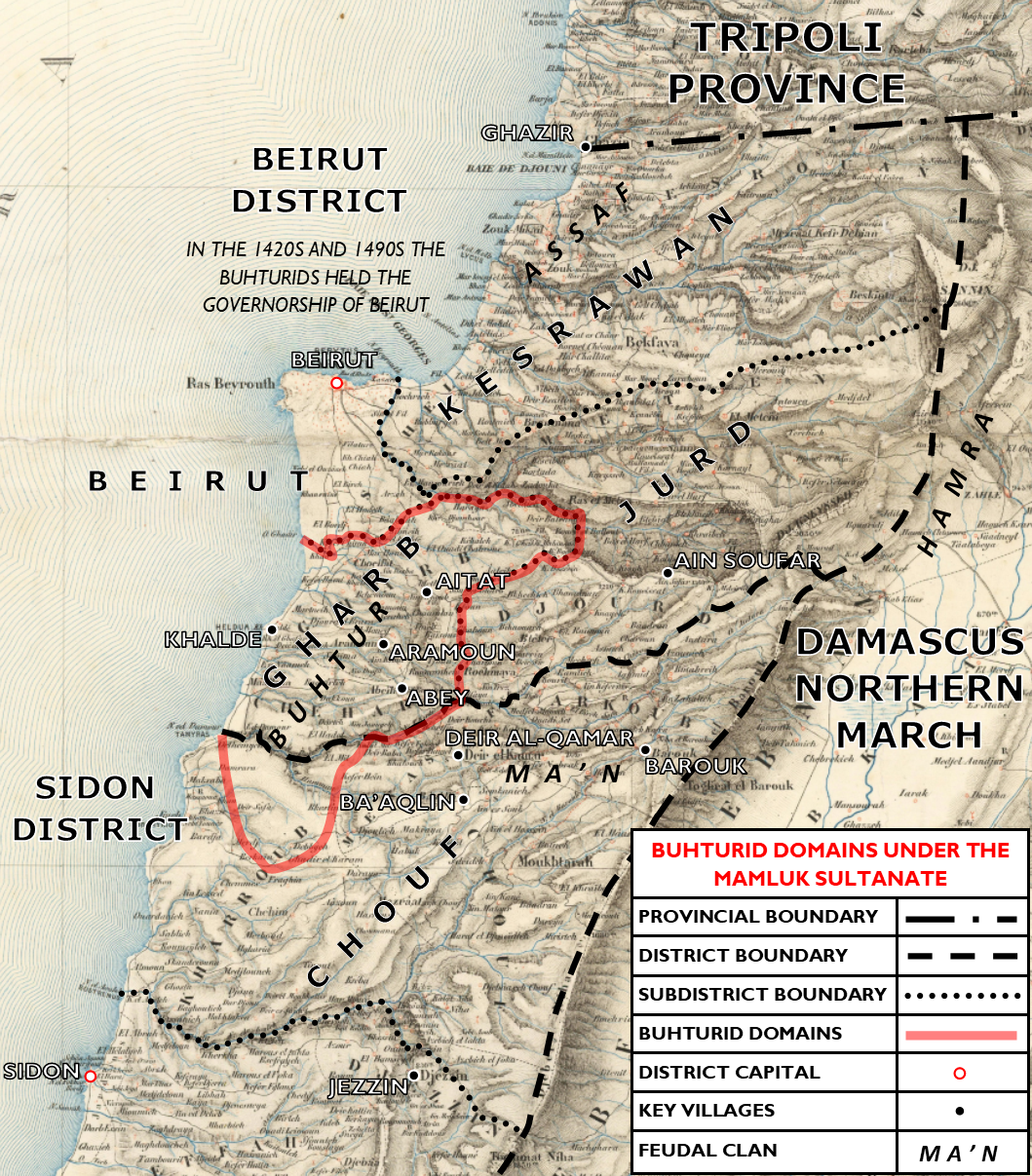
Map of the Buhturid domains in Mount Lebanon under Mamluk rule

The Tanukhids were Christianised in the 3rd or 4th centuries, likely while in the eastern half of the Fertile Crescent, and by the 4th century they were described as having a "fanatic zeal for Christianity" and were "zealous Christian soldiers" in the 6th century. In the 7th century, during the Muslim conquest of the Levant, the Tanukhids fought with the Romans against the Muslims, including in the Battle of Yarmouk. After Yarmouk, their status as foederati ended. They were described as an "autonomous Christian community in Bilad al-Sham" up until the reign of the Abbasid caliph al-Mahdi (r. 775–785), after which they appear as Muslims. Their conversion to Islam is believed to have been forced upon them by al-Mahdi. They are reported to have been devoted to Christianity, Thomas the Apostle and monasticism, with many monasteries associated with the tribe.

Epistle 50, one of the Epistles of Wisdom composed by Druze missionaries in the early 11th century, was explicitly directed to three Tanukhid emirs settled in the mountainous Gharb area southeast of Beirut, calling on them to continue the tradition of their ancestors in spreading Druze teachings. The Gharb was less rugged than the neighboring areas to the north and south, and its strategic value stemmed from its control of Beirut's southern harbor and the road connecting Beirut with Damascus. The warrior peasants who inhabited the Gharb subscribed to the Druze faith, an esoteric offshoot of Isma'ili Shia Islam, the religion of the Fatimid caliphs of Egypt. Shahid holds that the Tanukh entered the Gharb as Sunni Muslims and afterward became Druze. Their leaders in the Gharb may have received and embraced the Fatimid Isma'ili da'wa (mission) as early as the late 10th century.

In the 11th century, the Tanukhids of Mount Lebanon inaugurated the Druze community in Lebanon, when most of them accepted and adopted the new message, due to their leadership's close ties with then Fatimid caliph al-Hakim bi-Amr Allah. In the 14th century, the central parts of Mount Lebanon were described as a Tanukhid stronghold, housing both Druze and Shiite Muslims. Members of the Tanukhids in Mount Lebanon include Al-Sayyid al-Tanukhi, a prominent 15th century Druze theologian and commentator; and Muhammad bin al-Muwaffaq al-Tanukhi, an emir and Shiite Muslim who lived in the 13th century.

=== Kisrawan campaigns ===
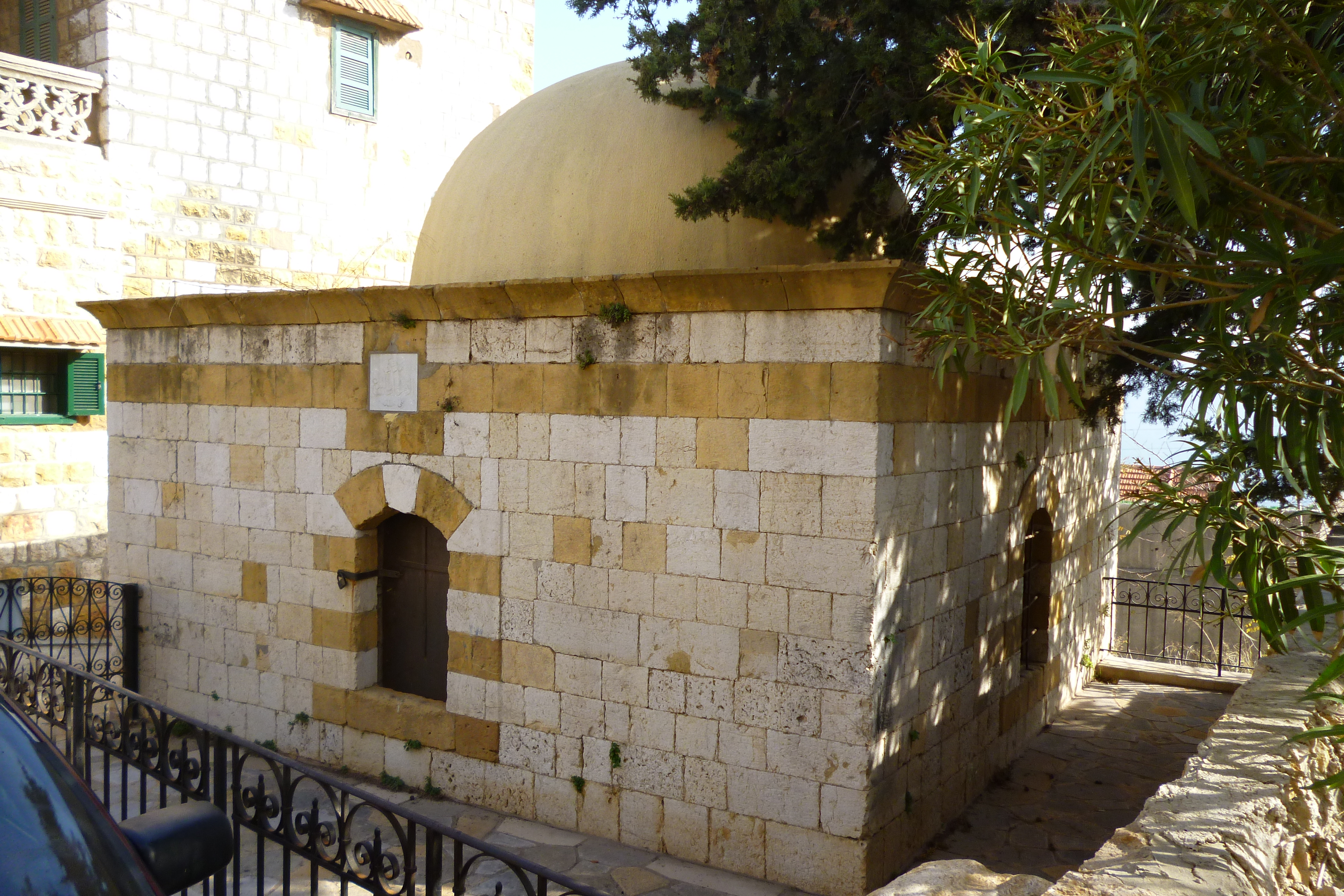
The Druze shrine in Brummana: a town predominantly inhabited by Christians, albeit with a significant Druze minority

The Kisrawan campaigns were a series of Mamluk military expeditions against the mountaineers of the Kisrawan, as well as the neighboring areas of Byblos and the Jurd, in Mount Lebanon. The offensives were launched in 1292, 1300 and 1305. The mountaineers were Shia Muslim, Alawite, Maronite and Druze tribesmen who historically acted autonomously of any central authority. The Maronites in particular had maintained close cooperation with the last Crusader state, the County of Tripoli. After the fall of Tripoli to the Mamluks in 1289, the mountaineers would often block the coastal road between Tripoli and Beirut, prompting the first Mamluk expedition in 1292 under the viceroy of Egypt, Baydara. During that campaign, the Mamluks, spread along the coastal road and cut off from each other at various points, were constantly harried by the mountaineers, who confiscated their weapons, horses and money. Baydara withdrew his men only after paying off the mountain chiefs. In modern Lebanese historical narratives, the Kisrawan campaigns have been a source of controversy by historians from different religious groups. Maronite, Shia and Druze historians have each sought to emphasize the roles of their respective confessional group, over each other, in defending the autonomy of the Kisrawan from Mamluk outsiders. In writings by Sunni Muslim authors, the Mamluks are portrayed as the legitimate Muslim state working to incorporate Mount Lebanon into the rest of the Islamic realm. The Sunni Mamluk campaigns led to the destruction of many Christian churches and monasteries and Druze sanctuaries khilwat, and caused mass destruction of Maronite and Druze villages and the killings and mass displacement of its inhabitants.

In the 12th century Kisrawan had a tribal and religiously mixed population of Maronite Christians, Twelver Shia Muslims, Alawites and Druze. Information about the Christians of the Kisrawan before the 12th century is scant, though in the 9th century there was evidently an organized Christian, likely Maronite, community governed by village headmen. Under Muslim rule, Christians were mandated to pay the jizya, a form of poll tax, though its actual collection in Mount Lebanon was likely done on an inconsistent basis. The Druze religion, which branched off of Isma'ili Shia Islam in the early 11th century, and separated later from both Isma'ilism and Islam altogether, gained adherents among people in Mount Lebanon and its environs, including much of the Tanukh settlers in the hills east of Beirut. Certain aspects of the faith, such as transmigration of souls between adherents and incarnation, were viewed as heretical or kufr (infidelity) and foreign by Sunni and Shia Muslims, but contributed to solidarity among the Druze, who closed their religion to new converts in 1046 due to the threat of persecution.

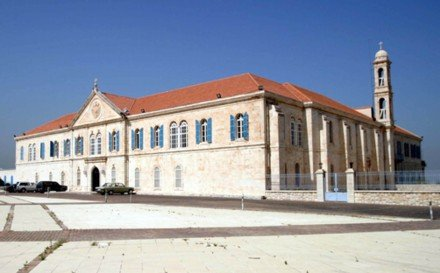
The Maronite Patriarchate in Bkerke, Kisrawan

The historian Ahmed Beydoun describes the efforts by 20th-century Maronite authors to emphasize the Maronite role in the events as an attempt to prove the community's early presence in the Kisrawan. In this way, the Maronites' abandonment of the region in the aftermath of the campaigns could be described as a "forced exile" and the Maronite settlement of the Kisrawan in the 16th and 17th centuries as their "return". On the other hand, Beydoun views the narratives of the expeditions by modern Shia Lebanese historians, which emphasize Shia Muslims' defense of the mountains' autonomy from the Mamluks, as part of an effort to bolster Shia credentials as a core Lebanese community. Lebanese Sunni authors generally write of the campaigns from a pro-Mamluk stance, seeing in them the legitimate Muslim state's efforts to incorporate Mount Lebanon into the Islamic realm, while Druze authors write with a focus on the Druze community's consistent connection to Mount Lebanon and defense of its practical autonomy.

=== Ma'n dynasty ===
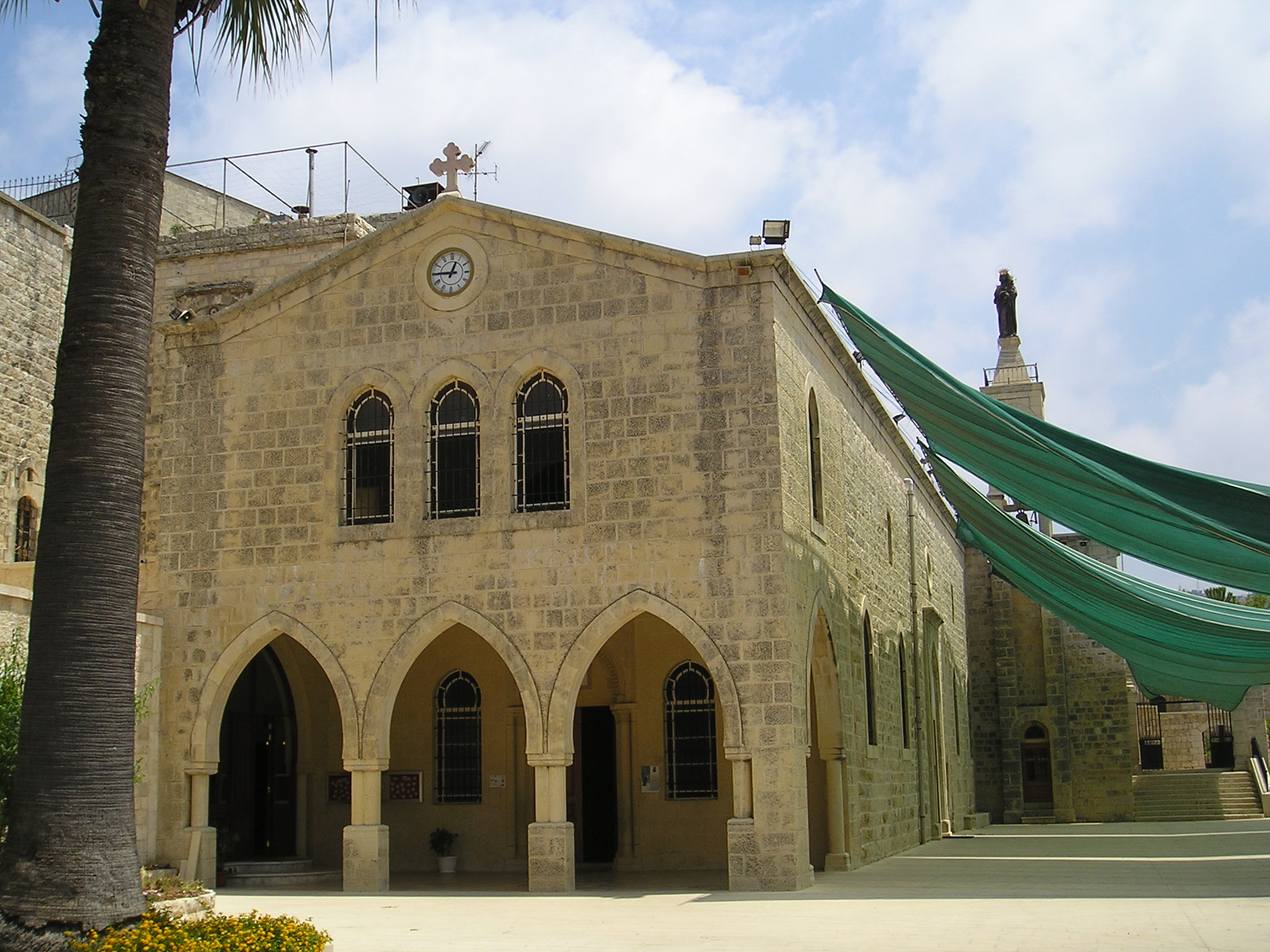
Church of Saidet et Tallé in Deir al-Qamar was rebuilt during the reign of the Druze Ma'n dynasty.

The Ottomans, through the Ma'n dynasty, a great Druze feudal family, and the Shihabs, a mixed Sunni Muslim-Druze family that had converted to Christianity. Ma'n dynasty were a family of Druze chiefs of Arab stock based in the rugged Chouf area of southern Mount Lebanon who were politically prominent in the 15th–17th centuries. Deir al-Qamar was the capital and the residence of the Emirate of Mount Lebanon. The Church of Saidet et Tallé is a Maronite church in Deir el Qamar in Lebanon, it is one of the most important historical and religious sites in Deir el Qamar and dates to the 16th century. The second church was destroyed by the Saracens and rebuilt during Fakhreddine 1st Maan's (1518–1544) reign. In 1673, Sheikh Abu Fares Karam of Ehden (Emir Ahmad Ma'n's secretary) and his brother Sheikh Abu Nader enlarged the church and added a vault. During the reign of Bechir II Chehab (1789–1840) it was again enlarged and renovated.

Fakhr-al-Din II (1572–1635) was a Druze prince and a leader of the Mount Lebanon Emirate. For uniting modern Lebanon's constituent parts and communities, especially the Druze and the Maronites, under a single authority for the first time in history, he is generally regarded as the country's founder. Christians prospered and played key roles under his rule, with his main enduring legacy being the symbiotic relationship he set in motion between Maronites and Druze, which proved foundational for the creation of a Lebanese entity. Maronite Abū Nādir al-Khāzin was one of his foremost supporters and served as Fakhr-al-Din's adjutant. Phares notes that "The emirs prospered from the intellectual skills and trading talents of the Maronites, while the Christians gained political protection, autonomy and a local ally against the ever-present threat of direct Ottoman rule. In mid-1609 Fakhr al-Din gave refuge to Maronite Patriarch Yuhanna Makhlouf upon the latter's flight from northern Mount Lebanon. In a 1610 letter from Pope Paul V to Makhlouf, the Pope entrusted Fakhr al-Din with the protection of the Maronite community.

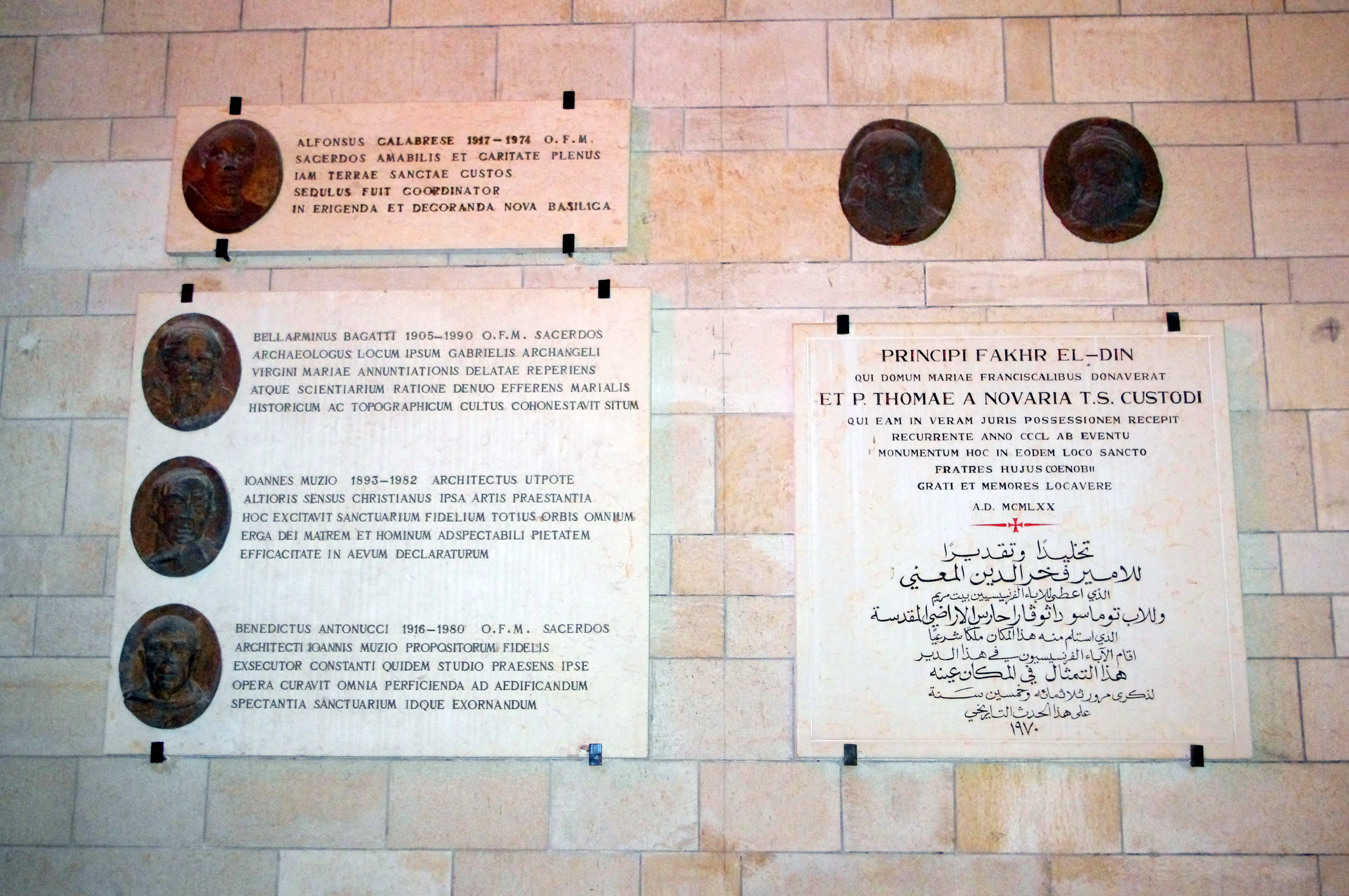
Emir Fakhr ad-Din granted the Franciscans permission to return to Nazareth and the church ruins in 1620.

Under Fakhr al-Din's overlordship, Maronite, Greek Orthodox, and Greek Catholic Christians began migrating to the Druze Mountain in large numbers; the devastation wrought on the Druze peasantry during the punitive government campaigns of the 16th century had likely caused a deficit of Druze farm labor for the Druze landowners, which was partly filled by the Christian migrants. Christians were settled in Druze villages by the Druze tribal chiefs in the days of Fakhr al-Din to stimulate agricultural production, centered on silk, and the chiefs donated land to the Maronite Church and monastic institutions to further facilitate Christian settlement. Fakhr al-Din made the first such donation in 1609. Although the Druze chiefs owned much of the Chouf lands on which the silk crop was grown, Christians dominated every other aspect of the silk economy there, including production, financing, brokerage to the markets of Sidon and Beirut and its export to Europe. Toward the close of the 16th century, the Medici grand dukes of Tuscany had become increasingly active in the eastern Mediterranean, pushed for a new crusade in the Holy Land, and began patronizing the Maronite Christians of Mount Lebanon. The Emir's religious tolerance endeared him to the Christians living under his rule. Fakhr-al-Din II was the first ruler in modern Lebanon to open the doors of his country to foreign Western influences. Under his auspices the French established a khān (hostel) in Sidon, the Florentines a consulate, and Christian missionaries were admitted into the country. According to Duwayhi:

Under Emir Fakhr al-Din the Christians could raise their heads high. They built churches, rode horses with saddles, wore turbans of fine muslin and belts with precious inlays, and carried jeweled rifles. Missionaries from Europe came and established themselves in Mount Lebanon. This was because his troops were Christians, and his stewards and attendants Maronites.

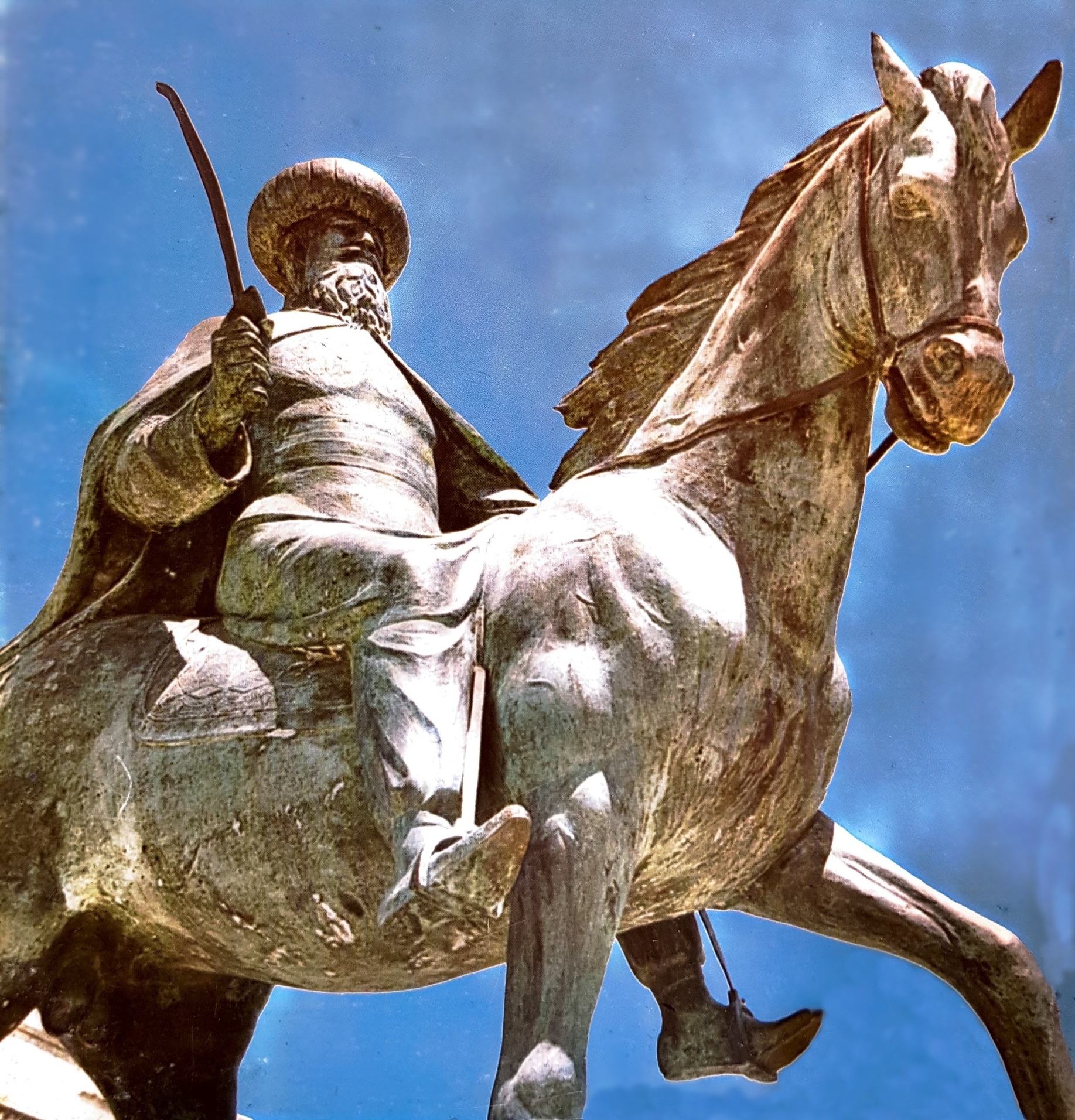
A statue of Fakhr ad-Din in the Druze town of Baaqlin in the Chouf

In Lebanese nationalist narratives, Fakhr-al-Din II is celebrated as establishing a sort of Druzes–Maronite condominium that is often portrayed as the embryo of Lebanese statehood and national identity. Nationalist narratives by Lebanese Druze and Maronites agree on Fakhr al-Din's "decisive influence and contribution to Lebanon's history", according to the historian Yusri Hazran, though they differ significantly in determining the Emir's motives and the historic significance of his rule. Druze authors describe him as the ideal ruler who strove to achieve strong domestic unity, build a prosperous economy, and politically free Lebanon from Ottoman oppression. Making the case that the Ma'nids worked toward Lebanon's integration into the Arab regional environment, the Druze authors generally de-emphasize his relations with Europe and portray his drive for autonomy as the first forerunning of the Arab nationalist movement. On the other hand, Maronite authors viewed the legacy of Fakhr al-Din as one of isolation from the Arab–Islamic milieu. Fakhr al-Din himself has been adopted by a number of Maronite nationalists as a member of the religious group, citing the refuge he may have taken with the Khazens in Keserwan during his adolescence, or claiming that he had embraced Christianity at his deathbed. According to the historian Christopher Stone, Fakhr al-Din was used by the Rahbani brothers in their Lebanese nationalist play, The Days of Fakhr al-Din, as "a perfect historical predecessor for Lebanon's Christian nationalism of the twentieth century".

=== Shihab dynasty ===
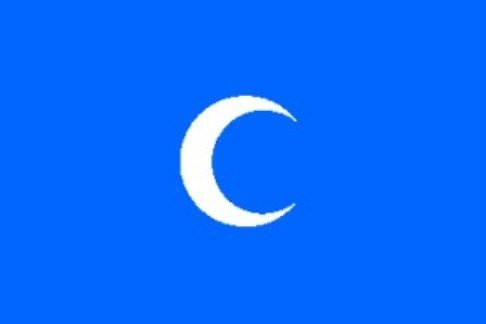
Shihab dynasty flag: Many members of the Shihab family converted to Christianity.

The Shihab dynasty was an Arab family whose members served as the paramount tax farmers and local chiefs of Mount Lebanon from the early 18th to mid-19th century, during Ottoman rule. Their reign began in 1697 after the death of the last Ma'nid chief. In 1697, Amir Ahmad died without an heir, and the Druze notables chose his nephew Bashir al-Shihabi as their new ruler. He was succeeded in 1707 by the young Amir Haydar al-Shihabi, grandson of Amir Ahmad al-Ma'ni. Haydar recognized the authority of the Maronite al-Khazins and the Hubayshis of Kisrawan and Ghazir and treated these two families as equal to the feudalistic Druze families. The Shihab family realized the importance of Maronite rule and power, and they and the Maronites became united in a common interest. The family centralized control over Mount Lebanon, destroying the feudal power of the mostly Druze lords and cultivating the Maronite clergy as an alternative power base of the emirate. During Yusuf Shihab's rule, many members of the Shihab family converted to Christianity and Yusuf also began to rely on the support of the Maronite Christians.

On 3 September 1840, Bashir Shihab III, a distant cousin of the once-powerful Emir Bashir Shihab II, was appointed emir of Mount Lebanon by Ottoman Sultan Abdulmejid I. Geographically, the Mount Lebanon Emirate corresponded with the central part of present-day Lebanon, which historically has had a Christian and Druze majority. In practice, the terms "Lebanon" and "Mount Lebanon" tended to be used interchangeably by historians until the formal establishment of the Mandate. Yusuf Shihab and Bashir Shihab II were the only Maronite rulers of the Emirate of Mount Lebanon. The Shihab family allied with Muhammad Ali of Egypt during his occupation of Syria, but was deposed in 1840 when the Egyptians were driven out by an Ottoman-European alliance, leading soon after to the dissolution of the Shihab emirate. Despite losing territorial control, the family remains influential in modern Lebanon, with some members having reached high political office.

The Khazens opposed the creation of the "Double Qaimaqmate" in Mount Lebanon in the 1840s, which divided Mount Lebanon into Druze and Christian-run sectors, and were incensed at the appointment of a sheikh from the mixed Druze-Christian Abu'l-Lama family as the qaimaqam (deputy governor) of the Maronite section of the Qaimaqamate. The Khazens feared that such an appointment would formally subordinate them to the Abu'l-Lama sheikhs. Several Khazen family members became destitute in the 1830s and 1840s and Khazen influence over the Maronite Church waned. To compensate for their economic, social and political stagnation, the Khazens increased their pressure on the peasants of Kisrawan in the late 1850s, while also spending extravagantly.

The "Druze-Christian alliance" during this century was the major factor enabling the Shehab dynasty to maintain power. By the middle years of the eighteenth century, the Shihabi amirs converted to Christianity, so did several other Druze amirs and prominent Druze clans, like the originally Druze Abi-Lamma clan (a Druze family who was a close ally of the Shihabs) which also converted to Christianity and joined the Maronite Church. After the Shihab dynasty converted to Christianity, the Druze lost most of their political and feudal powers. Also, the Druze formed an alliance with Britain and allowed Protestant Christian missionaries to enter Mount Lebanon, creating tension between them and the native Maronite Church. Approximately 10,000 Christians were killed by the Druze during inter-communal violence in 1860. This bloody conflict led to the destruction of at least 200 villages, with thousands maimed and killed on both sides. During the nineteenth and twentieth centuries, Protestant missionaries established schools and churches in Druze strongholds, with some Druze converting to Protestant Christianity; yet they did not succeed to convert Druze to Christianity en masse.

=== Double Qaim-Maqamate of Mount Lebanon ===
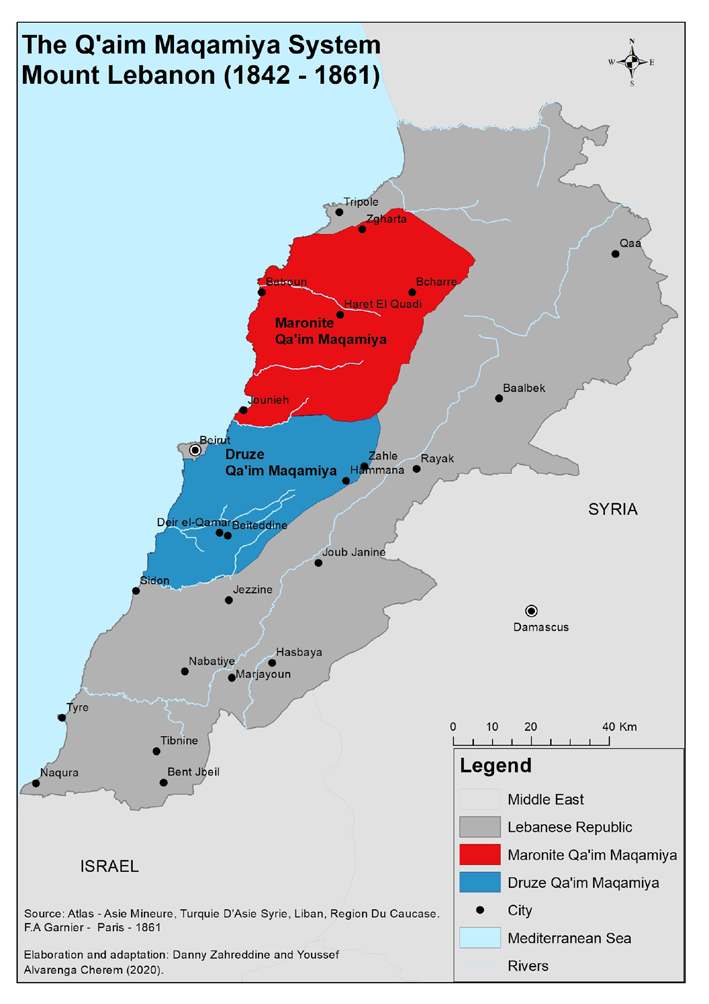
The Double Christian-Druze Qaim-Maqamate overlaid on the modern boundaries of Lebanon

The Double Qaim-Maqamate of Mount Lebanon (1843–1861) was one of the Ottoman Empire's subdivisions following the abolishment of the Mount Lebanon Emirate. After 1843, there existed an autonomous Mount Lebanon with a Christian and a Druze subdivision, which have been created as a homeland for the Maronite Christians under European diplomatic pressure following the 1841 massacres, and for the Druze segment of the population. After the collapse of the Double Qaim-Maqamate due to the 1860 conflict, the Maronite Catholics and the Druze further developed the idea of an independent Lebanon in the mid-nineteenth century, through the creation of the Mount Lebanon Mutasarrifate.

The idea of dividing Mount Lebanon between Christians and Druze was a system proposed by the Austrian Chancellor Metternich between the British and the Ottomans, who backed the Druze demand for a Druze governor, and the French, who insisted on the return of the Shihab principality. Thus, the Druze emir Ahmad Arslan was appointed qāʾim maqām of the mixed southern district and Christian emir Haydar Ahmad Abu al-Lamaʿ qāʾim maqām of the mostly Christian northern district, each qāʾim maqām was to be accompanied by two wakils, a Druze and a Christian, who exercised their judicial and fiscal authority over the members of their respective communities. Emir Haydar Ahmad Abu al-Lamaʿwas a member of Abu'l-Lama clan, which converted to Christianity and joined the Maronite Church at the beginning of the eighteenth century. The British, after their Protestant missionaries were unable to win a large audience of native Lebanese Christians, supported and encouraged the Druze and supplied them with money and weapons, as did the French for the Maronites, with most of Britain and France's agents being Orientalists who spent many years in the Levant.

The declaration of the Qāʾim Maqāmiyya triggered a wave of violence and further worsened the religious tensions, a series of overlapping and complicated conflicts dominated the years that followed its declaration, with Christian commoners (led by Tanyus Shahin and Youssef Bey Karam) fighting against both Christian and Druze feudal lords and families (Christian feudal lord families include: Khazen family, Abu'l-Lama family and the Shihab family; Druze feudal lord families include: Arslan family, Al Hamdans and Jumblatt family), and bad weather controlling the region in 1856–1858, alongside a crisis in silk production which cut the production of the valuable product in Mount Lebanon to a half, led to several peasant's revolts that ultimately caused the climax of the tensions between the Druze and the Maronites. Subsequently, the Mount Lebanon conflict of 1860 began and led to the demise of the Double Qaim-maqamate.

==== 1860 civil conflict in Mount Lebanon ====
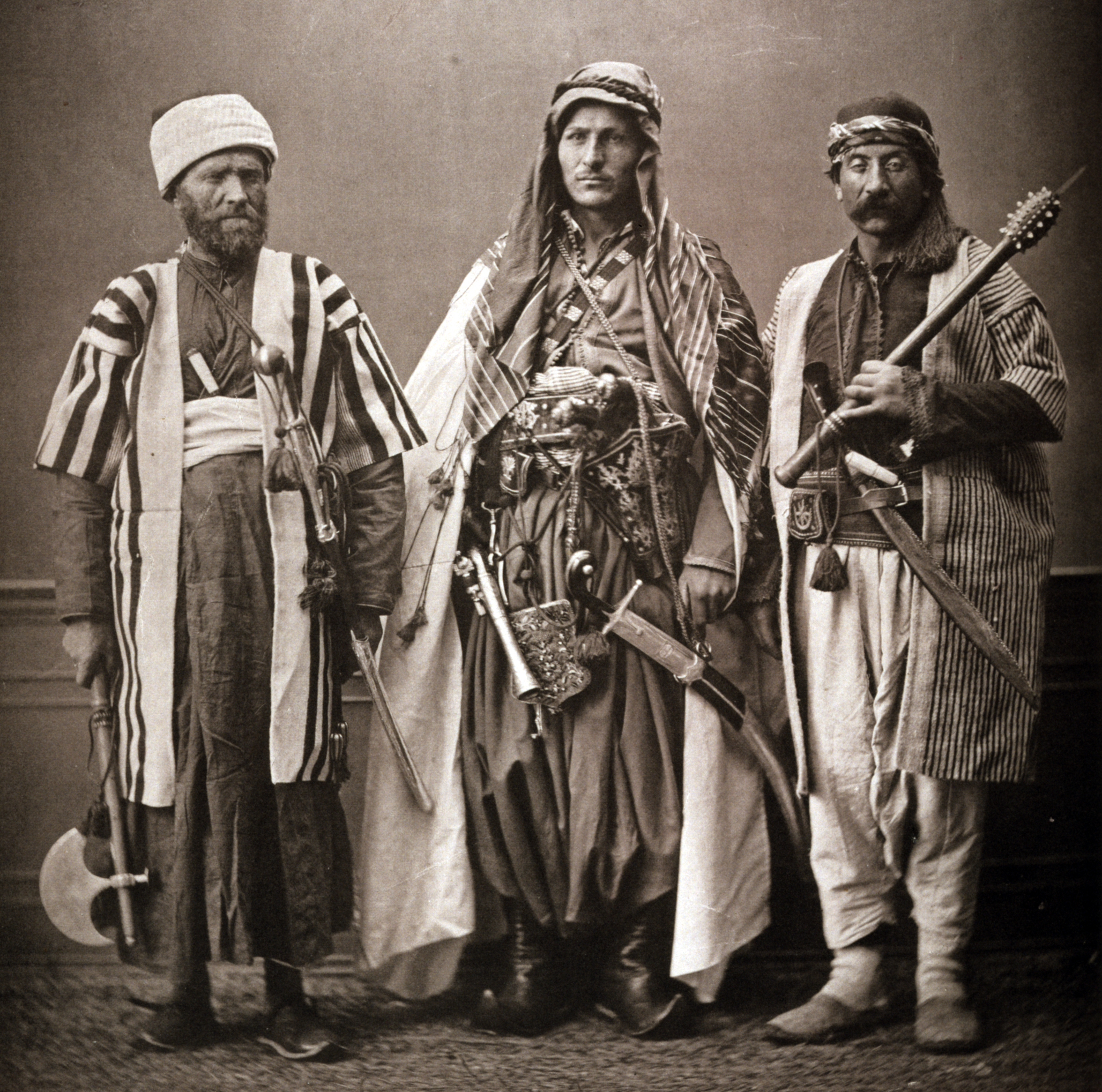
Left to right: Christian mountain dweller from Zahlé, Christian mountain dweller of Zgharta, and a Lebanese Druze man in traditional attire (1873)

The 1860 civil conflict in Mount Lebanon and Damascus (also called the 1860 Syrian Civil War) was a civil conflict in Mount Lebanon during Ottoman rule in 1860–1861 fought mainly between the local Druze and Christians. Following decisive Druze victories and massacres against the Christians, the conflict spilled over into other parts of Ottoman Syria, particularly Damascus, where thousands of Christian residents (10,0000) were killed by Muslim and Druze militiamen. The fighting precipitated a French-led international military intervention.

Bitter conflicts between Christians and Druzes, which had been simmering under Ibrahim Pasha's rule (mostly centred on the firmans of 1839 and, more decisively, of 1856, which equalised the status of Muslim and non-Muslim subjects, the former resenting their implied loss of superiority) resurfaced under the new emir (Bashir Shihab III). The sultan deposed Bashir III on 13 January 1842 and appointed Omar Pasha as governor of Mount Lebanon. Representatives of the European powers proposed to the sultan that Mount Lebanon be partitioned into Christian and Druze sections. On 7 December 1842, the sultan adopted the proposal and asked the governor of Damascus to divide the region into two districts: a northern district under a Christian deputy governor and a southern district under a Druze deputy governor. The arrangement came to be known as the "Double Qaimaqamate". Both officials were to be responsible to the governor of Sidon, who resided in Beirut. The Beirut-Damascus highway was the dividing line between the two districts.

While the Ottoman authorities pursued a divide-and-rule strategy, various European powers established alliances with the various religious groups in the region. The French established an alliance with the Lebanese Christians, while the Druze formalized an alliance with the British, allowing them to send Protestant missionaries into the region. The increasing tensions led to an outbreak of conflict between Christians and Druzes as early as May 1845. Consequently, the European great powers requested for the Ottoman sultan to establish order in Lebanon, and he attempted to do so by establishing a new council in each of the districts. Composed of members of the various religious communities, the councils were intended to assist the deputy governor.

Economic and demographic factors also played a role in undermining the peaceful coexistence of the Druze and Christian in this period. The Maronites benefited from the advantages of a modernising and expanding economy, built with French assistance, which was disproportionately accrued to them. Lebanese Christian wealth prospered because of connections with Europe. Additionally, the Maronite population had, over the span of only a few decades, dramatically overtaken that of the Druze. Numerically and commercially; Christians posed a threat to the traditional landlords Druze elite. As Lebanese Christians formed the wealthy elite and the educated class, they have had a significant impact on the politics and culture of the Arab World, and they created a growing demand for Western-style education in law, medicine, science, engineering, and finance, and for the greater opportunities for wealth.

=== Maronite-Druze dualism in Mount Lebanon Mutasarrifate ===
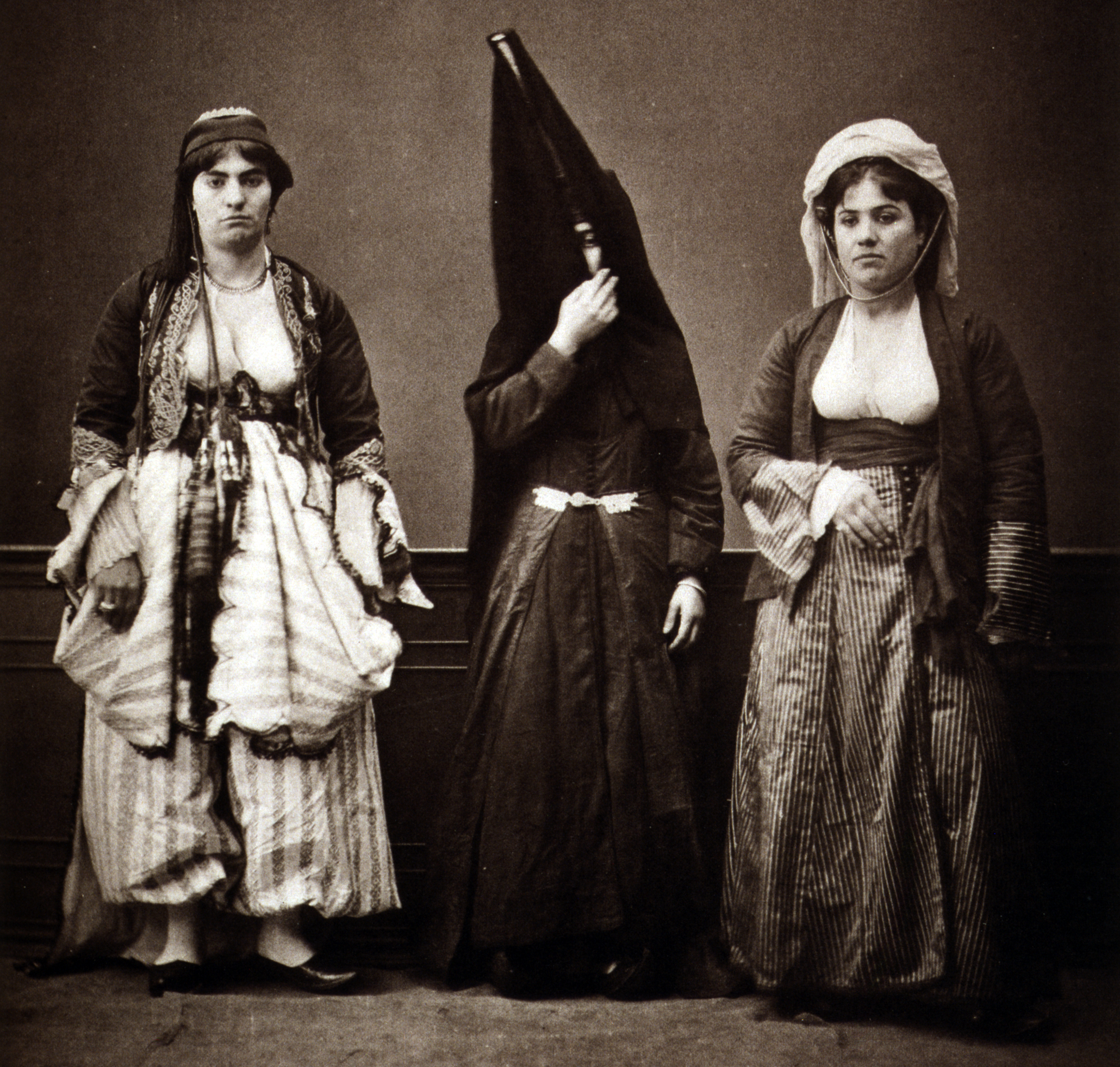
Left to right: Christian woman from Zahlé, Lebanese Druze woman, and a Christian woman from Zgharta (1873)

After fierce fighting erupted between the Druze and Maronite populations in the Mount Lebanon region in 1860, France and other Western nations then pressured the Ottomans to set up a semiautonomous region known as a Mutasarrifate. After 1861 there existed an autonomous Mount Lebanon with a Christian mutasarrıf, which had been created as a homeland for the Maronites under European diplomatic pressure following the 1860 massacres. Historians link the Maronite ascendancy in the Mutasarrifate to their alliance with the French and their subsequent domination of the silk trade, through the development of a Maronite bourgeoisie class.

The Maronite Catholics and the Druze founded modern Lebanon in the early eighteenth century, through the ruling and social system known as the "Maronite-Druze dualism" which developed in Ottoman-era Mount Lebanon Mutasarrifate, creating one of the calmest atmospheres that Lebanon had ever lived in. The working out of this dualism greatly affected the character of independent Lebanon later. Upon the establishment of the Mutasarrifate system, the Christians and Druze groups entered in economic, political, and religious relations with Europeans rather than Ottomans.

The ruling and social system in the Mount Lebanon Mutasarrifate was formed from the Maronite-Druze dualism, and the security stability and Druze-Maronite coexistence in the Mutasarrifate allowed the development of the economy and the system of government. In 1870 many Christian foreign schools were opened in Lebanon, which were among the main centers of the renaissance (Nahda) and this led to the establishment of schools, universities, theater and printing presses. The remainder of the 19th century saw a relative period of stability, as Druze and Maronite groups focused on economic and cultural development which saw the founding of the American University of Beirut (Syrian Protestant College) and Saint Joseph University and a flowering of literary and political activity associated with the attempts to liberalize the Ottoman Empire.

Christians constituted the majority of the population of the Mutasarrifate of Mount Lebanon, and most of them belonged to the Syriac Maronite sect. The Maronites were concentrated in the region since they settled in northern Mount Lebanon, as for the rest of the districts, the Maronites mixed with other Christian sects and with the Druze, who formed the second largest sect in the mountain, and the majority of the residents of the Chouf and the Matn aqdiyah. There was also a noticeable presence of the Greek Orthodox in both parts of the mountain. As for the Shiites and the Sunnis, their presence was, and still is, very insignificant. As a result of this closeness and convergence, a number of Lebanese embraced the religion of their neighbors or their religious sect, and the alqāb became shared among Christians and Druze. Late in the century there was a short Druze uprising over the extremely harsh government and high taxation rates, but there was far less of the violence that had scalded the area earlier in the century. The total population in 1895 was estimated as 399,530, with 30,422 (7.8%) Muslims, 49,812 (12.5%) Druze and 319,296 (79.9%) Christians.

== Modern history ==
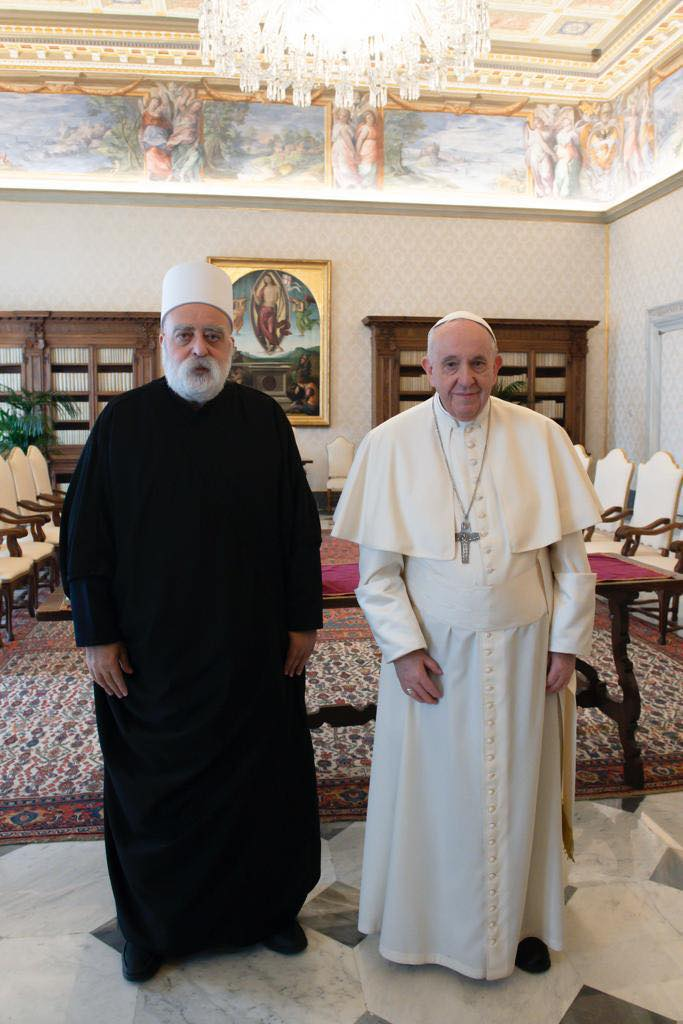
Pope Francis and Mowafaq Tarif, the spiritual leader of the Druze in Israel

The Maronite Catholic and the Druze founded modern Lebanon in the early eighteenth century, through the ruling and social system known as the "Maronite-Druze dualism" in Mount Lebanon Mutasarrifate. Contact between Christians (members of the Maronite, Eastern Orthodox, Melkite, and other churches) and the Unitarian Druze led to the presence of mixed villages and towns in Mount Lebanon, Chouf, Wadi al-Taym, Jabal al-Druze, the Galilee region, Mount Carmel, and Golan Heights. They both speak the Arabic language and follow a social patterns similar to those of other peoples in the Levant (Eastern Mediterranean). Scholars classify Antiochian Greek Christians, Druze, and Maronites as ethnoreligious groups.

The relationship between the Druze and Christians in Syria, Lebanon and Israel has been characterized by harmony and peaceful coexistence. Historically, they lived in the Chuf Mountains in complete harmony. On a social level, Druze and Christians have often interacted in daily life, sharing neighborhoods, schools, and workplaces. Druze and Christians in these regions celebrate each other's births, weddings, funerals, and celebrations such as Christmas, Maundy Thursday (in Lebanon), Easter and the Christian festival of Saint Elias (in Mount Carmel).

Before 2011, more than 55,000 Christians lived in As-Suwayda Governorate, the only governorate in Syria with a Druze majority. In 2010, more than 52,000 registered Christian voters, primarily Maronites and Greek Orthodox, lived in the Aley District, where Druze constitute the majority. In 2010 more than 8,000 Christians, mainly Melkite, Eastern Orthodox members of the Greek Orthodox Church of Jerusalem, and Maronites, lived in Druze-majority towns and cities in Israel.

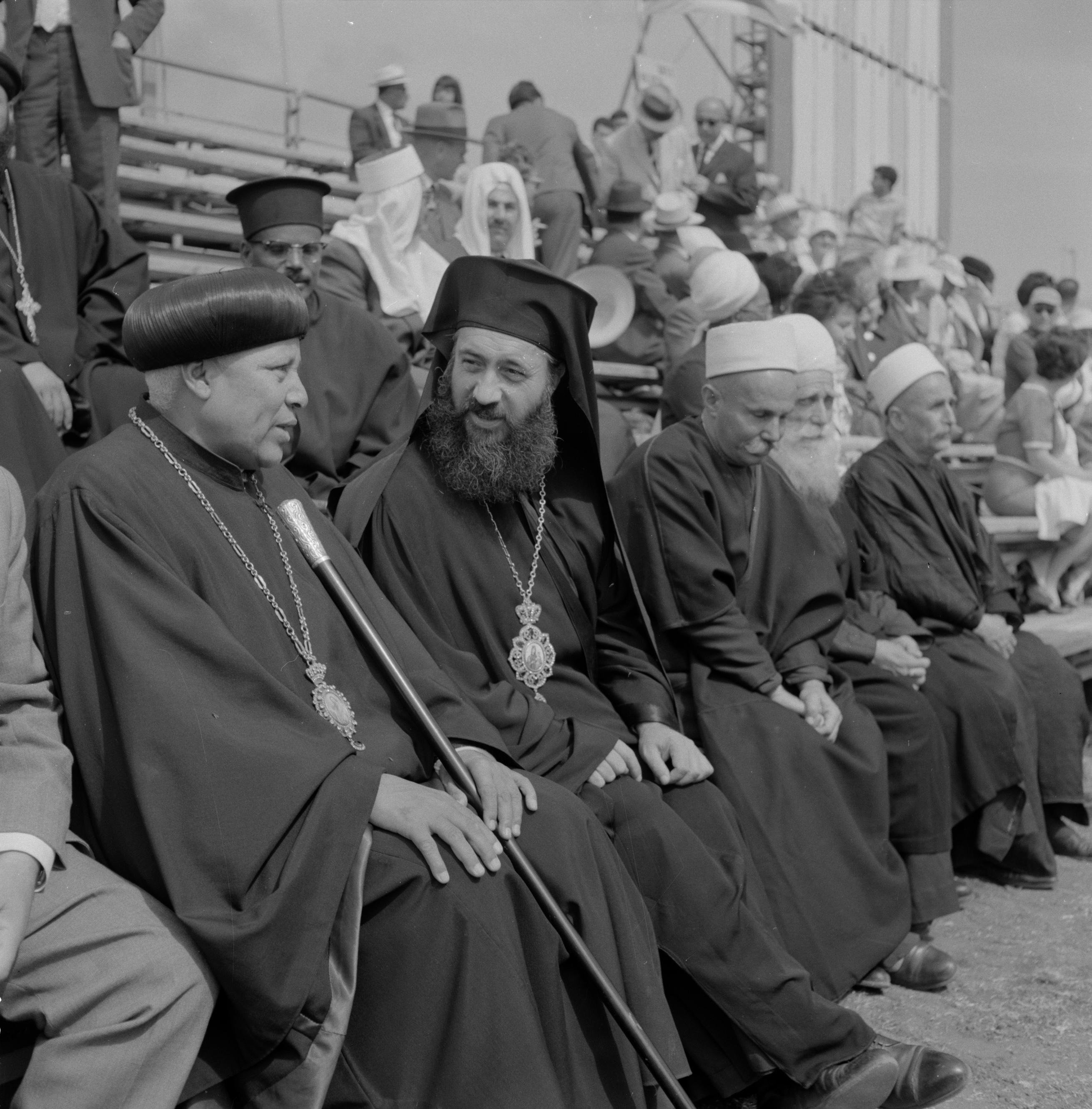
Druze and Christian clerics in Israel (1962)

Druze constitute one third of the residents of Rachaya District, and more than a quarter of the residents of Chouf District, which is considered the heartland of the Lebanese Druze community, as well as in the Matn District. They also constitute a significant minority in Marjeyoun District. On the other hand, Christians constitute approximately 40% of the population in Chouf District, and about a quarter of the populations in Rashaya District, while comprising a majority in Matn District and Marjeyoun District. Baabda District and Hasbaya District are predominantly inhabited by Christians and Druze populations.

In 2021 the largest Druze communities outside the Middle East are in Venezuela (60,000) and in the United States (50,000); both are predominantly Christian countries. Members of the Druze faith in the United States encounter challenges such as finding a Druze partner and adhering to endogamy, as marriage outside the Druze faith is strongly discouraged according to Druze doctrine. Additionally, they face the task of preserving their religious traditions, because many Druze immigrants to the United States have converted to Protestantism, joining primarily the Presbyterian or Methodist churches.

The early Druze migrants to Venezuela integrated well with the local population, and some Druze converted to Catholicism. However, the majority maintained a strong sense of Druze and Arab identity and adhered to Druze values. A notable example of Druze influence in this predominantly Catholic country is the former vice president, Tareck El Aissami, who is of Druze descent.

=== In Syria ===
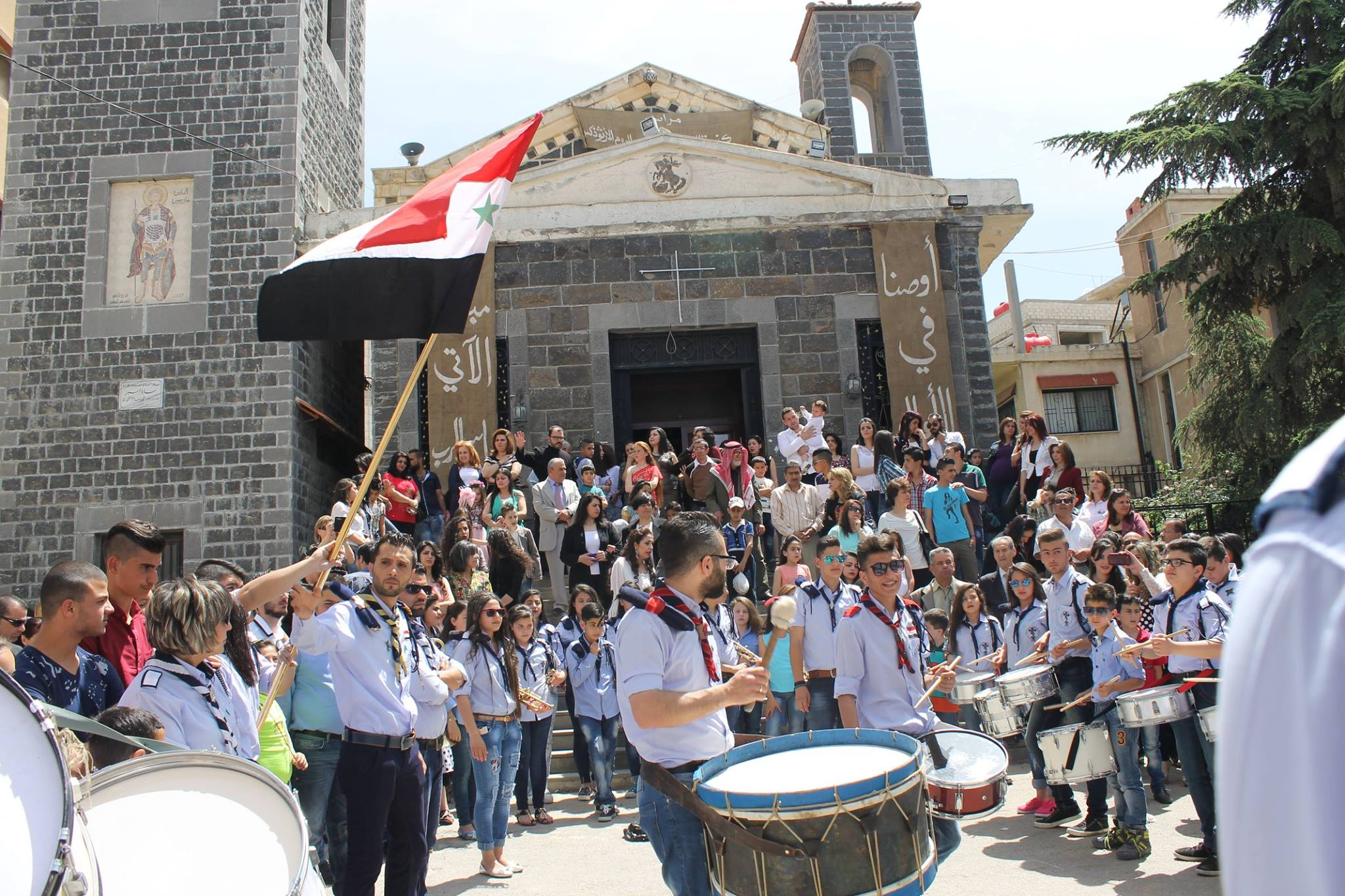
Orthodox Easter in As-Suwayda

In Syria, most Druze reside in the As-Suwayda Governorate, which encompasses almost all of Jabal al-Druze. This governorate is unique in Syria as it has a Druze majority. Additionally, it has integrated Christian communities that have long coexisted harmoniously with the Druze in these mountain. In the 1980s Druze made up 87.6% of the population, Christians (mostly Greek Orthodox) 11% and Sunni Muslims 2%. In 2010, the As-Suwayda governorate has a population of about 375,000 inhabitants, Druze made up 90%, Christians 7% and Sunni Muslims 3%. Due to low birth and high emigration rates, Christians proportion in As-Suwayda had declined. The Druze form a majority in the Jabal Hauran, which is part of the al-Suwayda Governorate. There is a significant Christian population, both Greek Orthodox and Greek Catholic (Melkite), in the Hauran region as a whole, though most Christians are concentrated in the towns and villages straddling the western foothills of Jabal Hauran. (Note: In the censuses of 1927, 1943 and 1956 Christians accounted for 9%–10% of the Jabal Druze State/as-Suwayda Governorate. In her survey in 1985, historian Robert Brenton Betts noted that this rate had likely declined and that many rural Christians had moved to as-Suwayda city, Damascus or outside of Syria. Localities in the Hauran with Christian pluralities or majorities include the city of Izra and the villages of Jubayb, Namer, Bassir and Tubna in the Daraa Governorate and Aslihah, Anz, Dara, Hit, Khabab, Kharaba, Sama al-Bardan in the as-Suwayda Governorate.)

Most of the Christians of Jabal Hauran are descents of the Ghassanids (Arab tribe). A major component of the Azd tribal confederation, the Ghassanids established themselves in Arabia Province and like the Salihids, embraced Christianity. The Byzantine era in the Hauran was marked by the dual processes of rapid Arabization and the growth of Christianity. According to the historian Kamal al-Shofani "Christians inhabited the region before the Druze, and some of them came to Jabal al-Druze (Mountain of the Druze) at the end of the 17th century, fleeing Ottoman oppression". In addition to the Bedouin, the 18th and 19th centuries also witnessed large migrations of Druze from Mount Lebanon to the Jabal Hauran, which gradually became known as the Jabal al-Druze ('mountain of the Druze'). Persistent migrations of Druze from Mount Lebanon, Wadi al-Taym and the Galilee, caused by the increased turbulence they faced, continued throughout the 18th century: historian Kais Firro stated that "each sign of danger in their traditional lands of settlement seemed to instigate a new Druze migration to the Hauran". During the final years of the decade-long Egyptian administration of Syria, the Druze of Jabal Hauran launched their first revolt against the authorities, in response to a conscription order by Ibrahim Pasha. By then, their numbers in the region had been swollen by migration. The 1860 Mount Lebanon civil war between the Druze and Christians and the resulting French military intervention caused another large exodus of Druze to Jabal Hauran.

The relationship between the Druze and Christians in As-Suwayda Governorate has been marked by harmony and peaceful coexistence, Before 2011, more than 55,000 Christians, primarily Greek Orthodox members of the Greek Orthodox Church of Antioch, Melkite, and Latin Catholic, lived in As-Suwayda Governorate, where they had several ancient churches. Many of them are members of Christian Arab tribes affiliated with the Ghassanids. Outside of the As-Suwayda Governorate, Christians and Druze coexist in several mixed villages and towns such as Jaramana, Sahnaya, and Jdeidat Artouz.

Villages in the Jabal al-Druze have many historical and ancient churches, most of them dedicated to saints favored by the Arabs. The architecture of the Byzantine era was influenced by the spread of Christianity and the consequent construction of churches and monasteries, the majority dating between the 4th century and early 6th century.

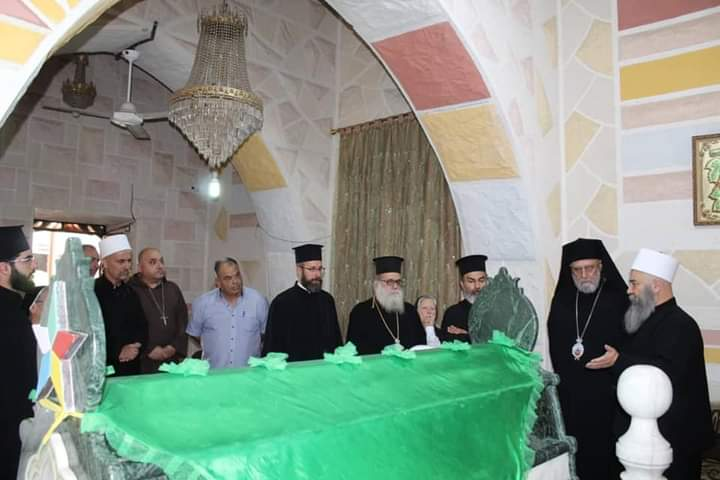
Druze and Christian clerics in As-Suwayda

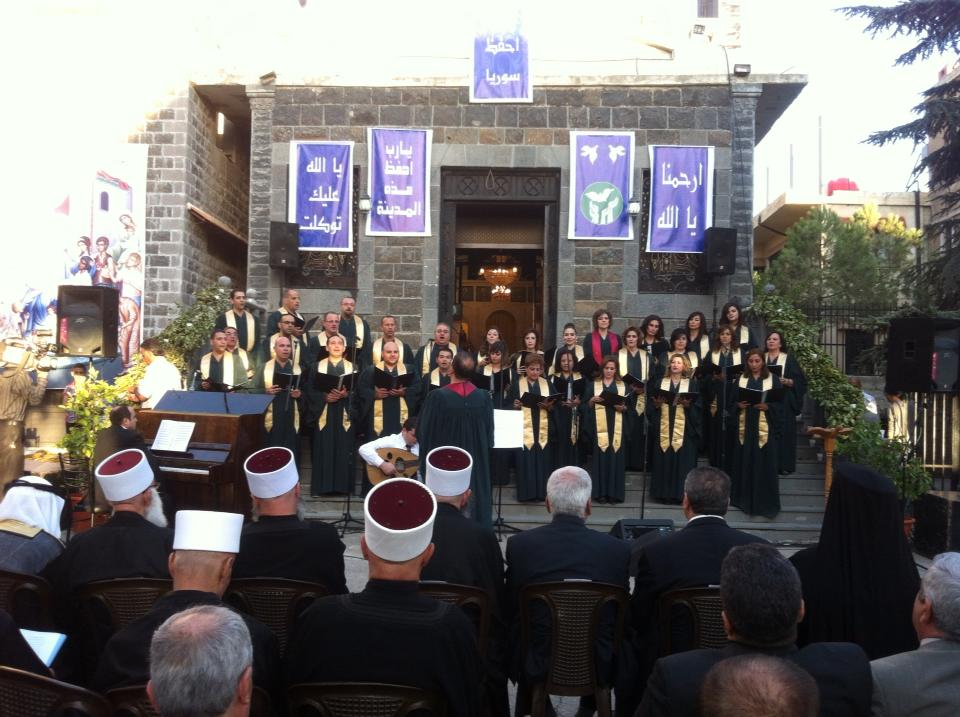
A joint Christian and Druze celebration in As-Suwayda

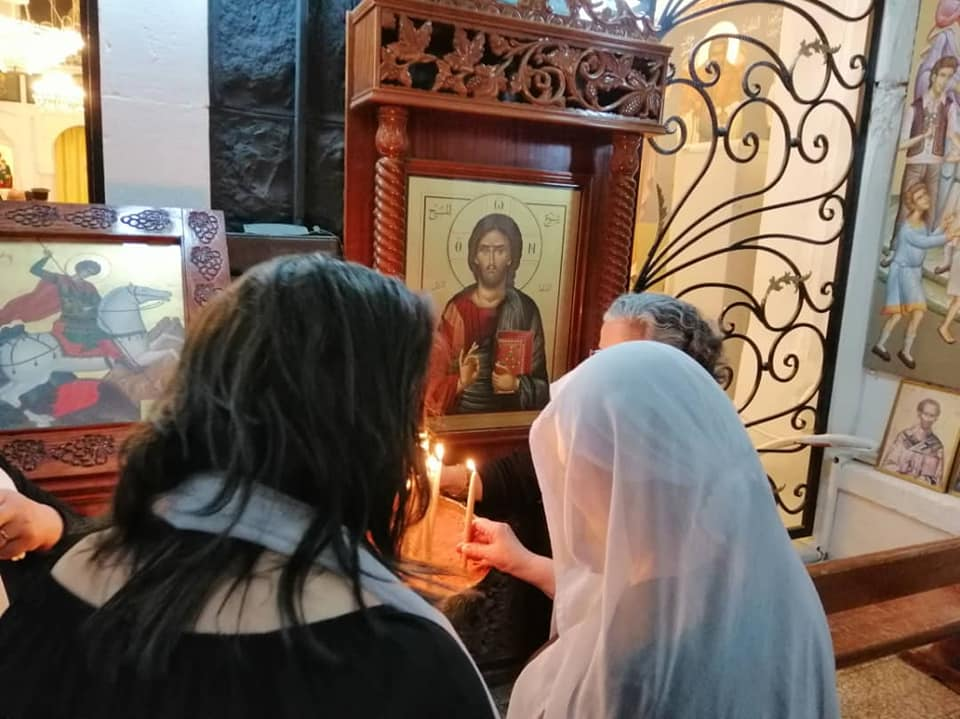
Christian and Druze women light candles in St. George's Cathedral, As-Suwayda

=== In Lebanon ===
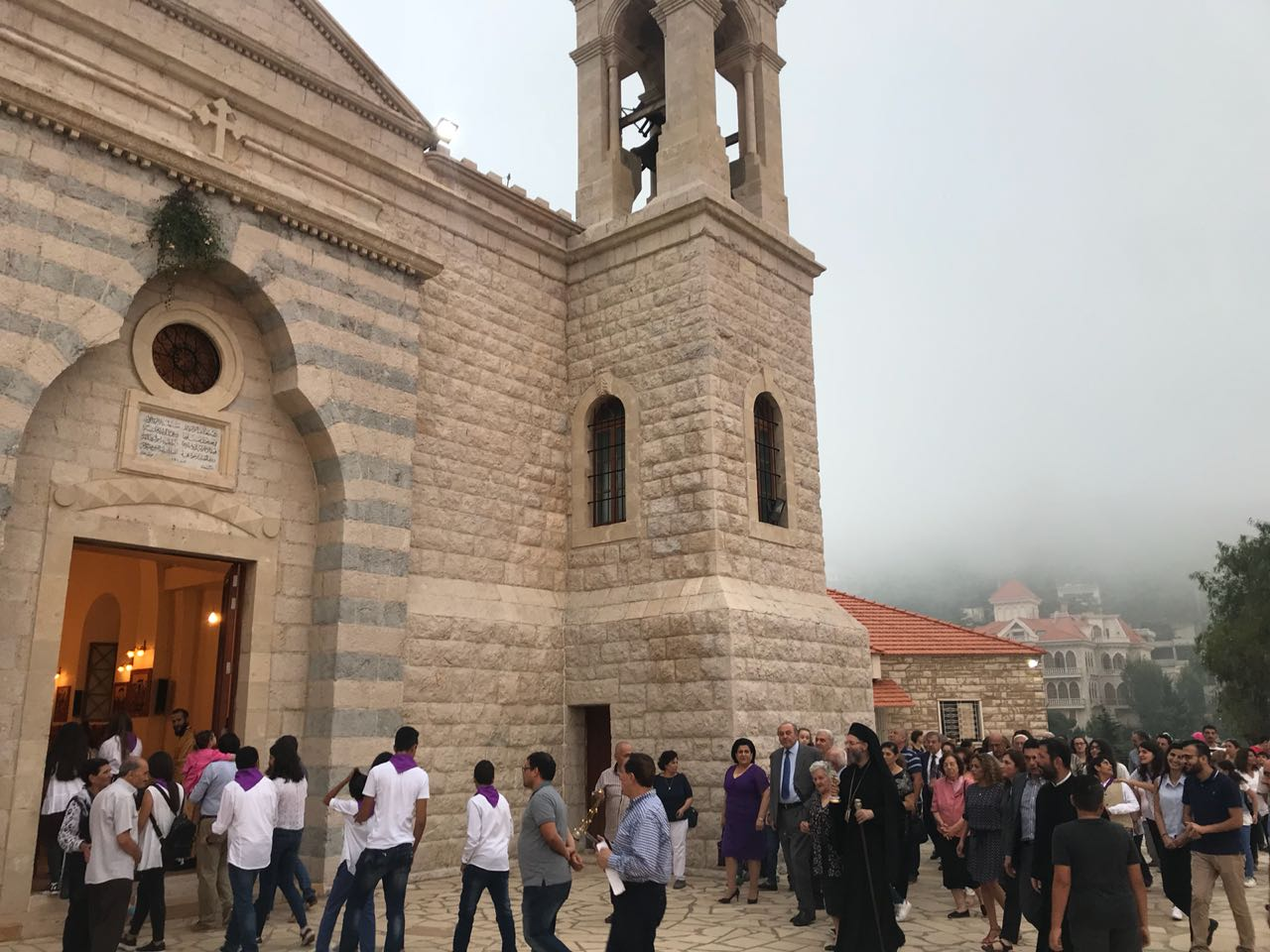
Saint George Orthodox Church in Aley is often considered to be in a region with one of the largest Druze populations in the world.

Lebanese Christians and Druze became a genetic isolate in the predominantly Islamic world. The Druzite and Maronite community in Lebanon played an important role in the formation of the modern state of Lebanon. Contact between Christians (members of the Maronite, Eastern Orthodox, Melkite, and other churches) and the Unitarian Druze led to the presence of mixed villages and towns in Mount Lebanon (Aley District, Baabda District, and Chouf District), Rashaya District, Hasbaya, Matn District, and Marjeyoun District.

The relationship between the Druze and Christians in Lebanon has been characterized by harmony and coexistence, and they lived in the Shuf Mountains in the past in complete harmony. Historian Ray Jabre Mouawad observes that there was religious symbiosis between the Druze and Christians in Mount Lebanon during the Ottoman period. Numerous cultural interactions took place in Mount Lebanon, resulting overlapped symbolism, veneration of common saints, and the use of common terminology to refer to God. Traces of these interactions can be found in the palaces and mausoleums of Druze lords, as well as in Maronite and Greek Orthodox churches.

Druze and Christians in Lebanon engage in mutual celebrations, including births, weddings, funerals, and religious festivities such as Christmas, Maundy Thursday and Easter. These traditions of sharing and celebration persisted both before and after Lebanese Civil War. Thursday of the Dead is a feast day shared by Christians and Druze in the Lebanon, it falls sometime between the Easter Sundays of the Catholic and Eastern Orthodox Christian traditions. It is a day on which the souls of the dead are honoured. Particularly popular among women in the region, this occasion highlights the shared cultural heritage between Arab Christians and Druze in Lebanon. Additionally, the baptism of children in accordance with Christian customs often took place within prominent Lebanese Druze families. Common surnames among Lebanese Christians and Druze include Abi-Lamma, Assaf, Atrash, Awar, Ballout, Barakat, Daou, Dergham, Faour, Farraj, Ghannam, Halabi, Harb, Hatoum, Hilal, Ibrahim, Jaber, Kadamani, Kadi, Malaeb, Nammour, Safadi, Saker, Saleh, Serhal, Shaya, Timani, Yaghi, and others.

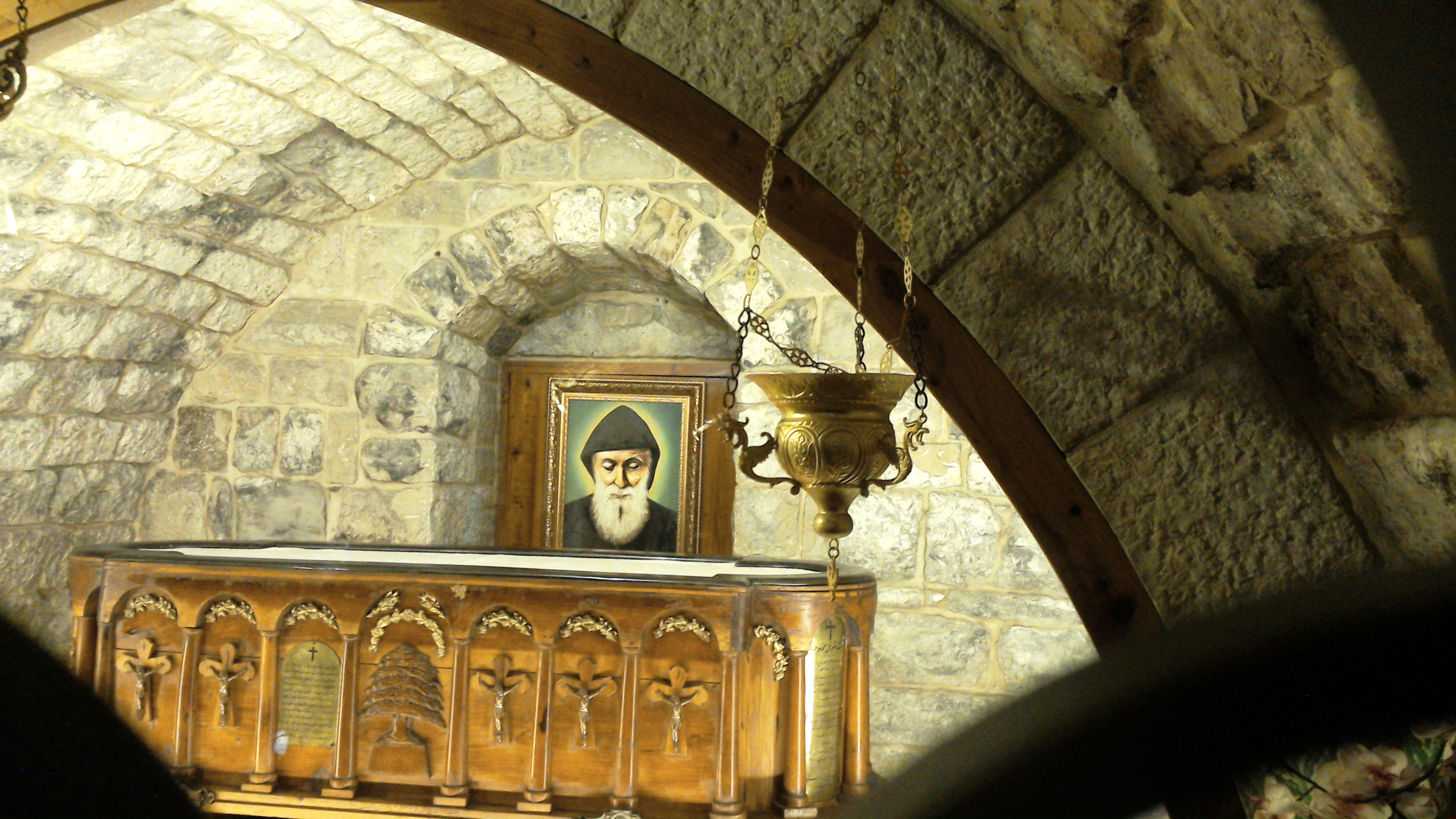
Saint Charbel shrine venerated by Christians, Muslims and Druze

Historically Druzes, by large, sent their children to Protestant schools and accepted an implicit orientation toward Britain. Many of the first graduates of the Syrian Protestant College in Beirut, the forerunner of AUB, were Druze, who over generations maintain an affinity to AUB. At the Catholic schools and universities (such as Notre Dame University–Louaize) in Lebanon, Christian and Druze students study and socialise together. Moreover, many members of the Druze political and cultural elite received their education in Christian institutions. Notable Druze figures who studied at these institutions include Abbas Halabi, Asad Al Faqih, Majid Arslan, Marwan Hamadeh, Manal Abdel Samad, and Kamal Jumblatt, who attended the prestigious Collège Saint Joseph – Antoura.

Marriage outside the Druze faith is rare and is strongly discouraged, and Druze can face serious social consequences if he or she converts to another faith to marry a non-Druze. According to Simon Haddad of Notre Dame University–Louaize "if a Druze marries a Christian or Muslim, they could both be ostracized and marginalized by their community, and this could have very serious consequences if the couple works in town". While according to United Nations High Commissioner for Refugees report: "Conversely, a source contacted by the Research Directorate of Canada's Immigration and Refugee Board in September 1998 advised that "there would be no problem for a mixed Druze/Orthodox Christian couple to live a normal life in Lebanon today"". Prominent examples of mixed Christian-Druze marriages in Lebanon include: Journalist Ghassan Tueni (Greek Orthodox) and Nadia Mohammad Ali Hamade (Druze), singer Yuri Mraqqadi (Christian) and Olfat Munther (Druze), Dalia Jumblatt, the daughter of the Lebanese Druze politician Walid Jumblatt, who is currently married to Joey Pierre El Daher, son of Pierre El Daher, a Maronite Christian.

Before and during the Lebanese Civil War (1975–1990), the Druze were in favor of Pan-Arabism, Arab nationalism and Palestinian resistance represented by the PLO. Many of the community supported the Progressive Socialist Party formed by their leader Kamal Jumblatt and they fought alongside other leftist and Palestinian parties against the Lebanese Front that was mainly constituted of Christians. At the time, the Lebanese government and economy were running under the significant influence of elites within the Maronite Christian community (Maronite politics). Christians mostly sided with the Western world while Druze, pan-Arabists, and leftists mostly sided with Soviet-aligned Arab countries. In August 2001, Maronite Catholic Patriarch Nasrallah Boutros Sfeir toured the predominantly Druze Chouf region of Mount Lebanon and visited Mukhtara, the ancestral stronghold of Druze leader Walid Jumblatt. The tumultuous reception that Sfeir received not only signified a historic reconciliation between Maronites and Druze, who fought a war in 1983–1984, but underscored the fact that the banner of Lebanese sovereignty had broad multi-confessional appeal and was a cornerstone for the Cedar Revolution in 2005.

For historical and political reasons, social and economic conditions vary among Lebanon's sects. Christians in Beirut dominated the most lucrative financial and commercial sectors, while Muslims had a significant presence in lower value-added industrial sectors. Muslims generally comprised the majority of the working class, while Christians predominated in the middle and upper classes (about 75%), also owning most small and medium-sized enterprises. Researcher Gordon observed that in 1980, the financial income of Christians was approximately 16% higher than that of the Druze and about 58% higher than that of the Shiites.

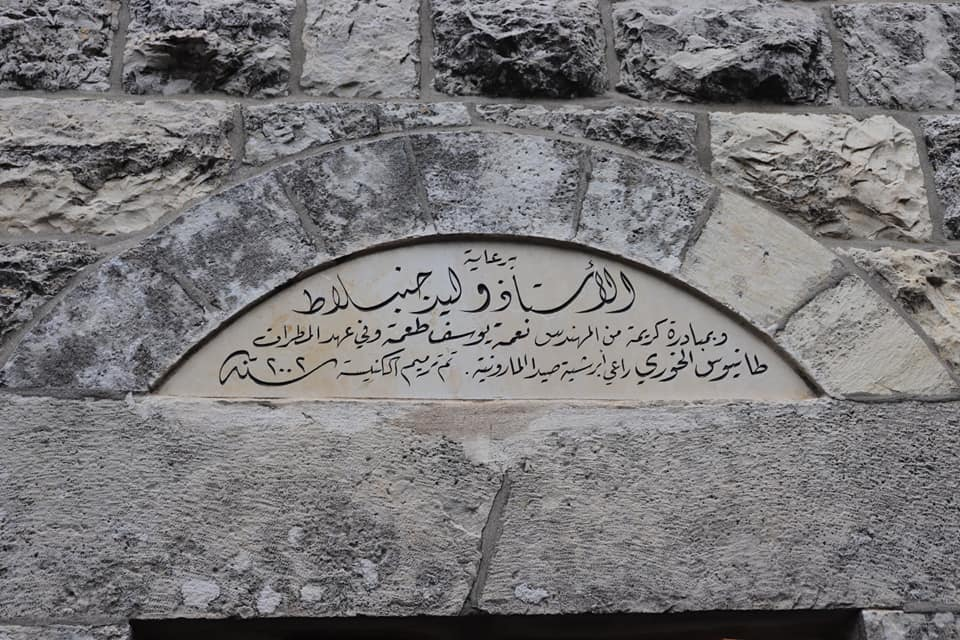
The restoration of the Church of St. Elijah in Baakleen was funded by Walid Jumblatt in 2002.

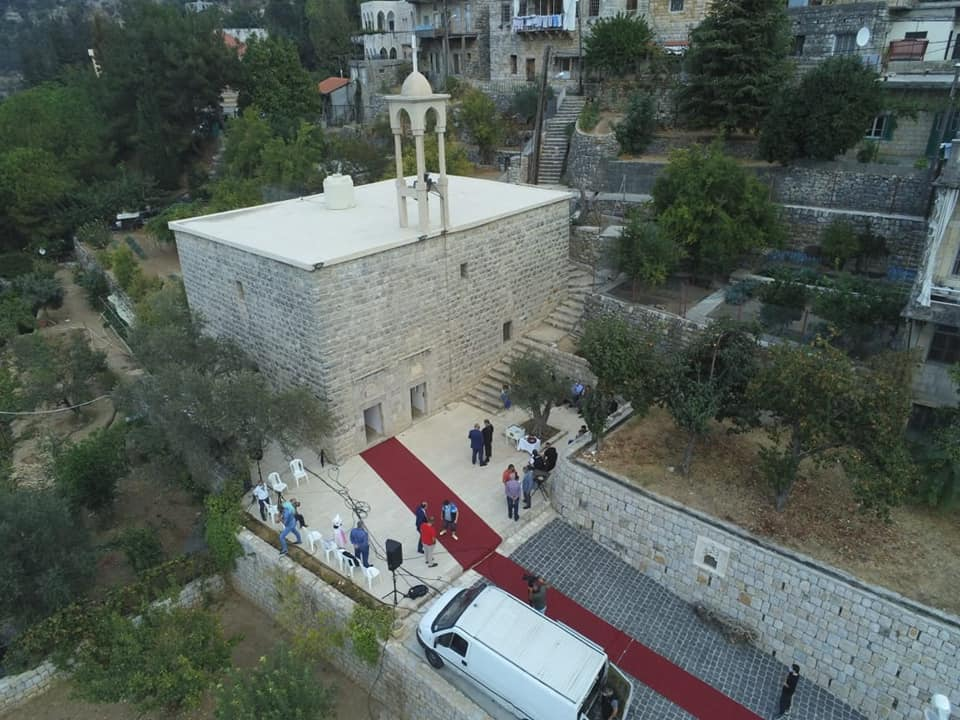
Our Lady El-Derr Maronite Church in Moukhtara is located in the heart of the Druze Jumblatt family's stronghold

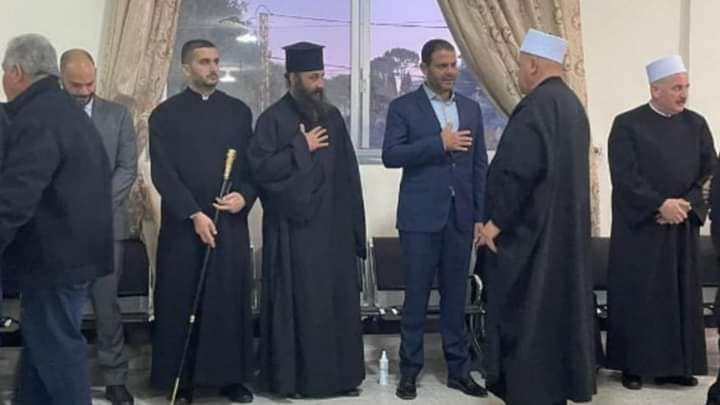
Christian and Druze clergy from Chouf

=== In Israel ===
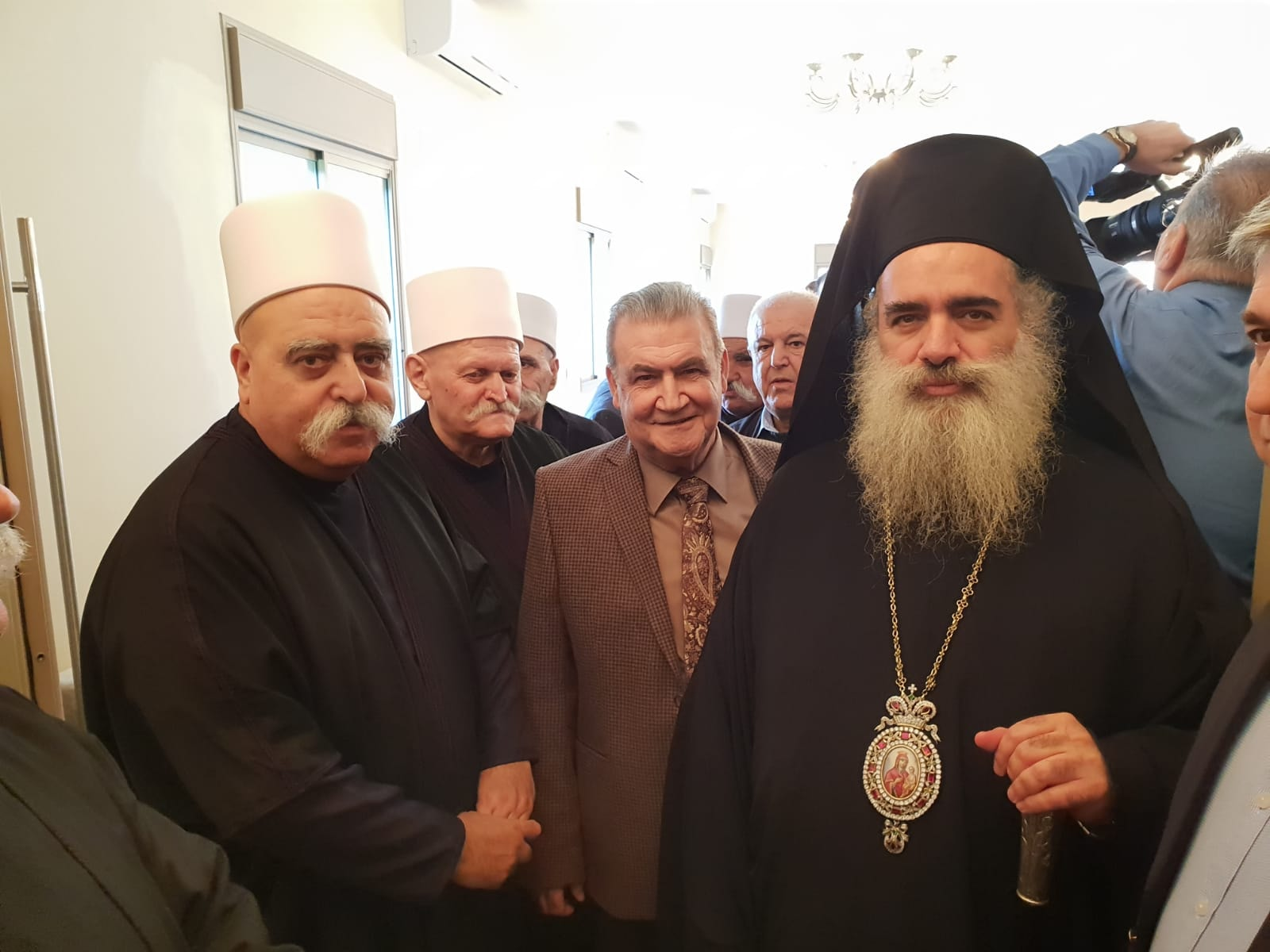
Druze and Christian clerics in Israel

The relationship between the Druze and Christians in Israel has generally been marked by harmony and peaceful coexistence, with both communities living together in peace, harmony, and friendship. However, there have been rare clashes, including instances of violence by the Druze against Christians, such as the incident in 2005 in the town of town of Maghar. Druze and Christians in Israel participate in each other's cultural events, including births, weddings, funerals, and celebrations like the Christian festival of Mar Ilyas (Saint Elias) in Haifa. Additionally, many Druze students are enrolled in Christian schools across the Galilee and Haifa regions. Some Druze towns are situated near significant Christian holy sites, with the most prominent being the Catholic Muhraqa Monastery located 2 kilometres southeast of Daliyat al-Karmel, the largest Druze town in Israel, and marks the contest between prophet Elijah and the priests of Ba'al. It belongs to the Carmelite Order. In the predominantly Druze town of Hurfeish, there is the Church and House of Saint Mariam Baouardy.

Interaction between Christians, including members of the Maronite, Eastern Orthodox, Melkite, and other churches, and the Unitarian Druze has resulted in the establishment of mixed villages and towns in Galilee region, Mount Carmel, and the Israeli-occupied portion of the Golan Heights. These include Abu Snan, Daliyat al-Karmel, Ein Qiniyye, Hurfeish, Isfiya, Kafr Yasif, Kisra-Sumei, Majdal Shams, Maghar, Peki'in, Rameh and Shefa-Amr, where more than 82,000 Druze and 30,000 Christians reside together. Among these mixed communities, the largest Christian populations in Druze towns are found in Maghar, followed by Isfiya and Peki'in. Conversely, the largest Druze communities in predominantly Christian towns are located in Rameh, followed by Kafr Yasif.

Before Israel's occupation, Christians accounted for 12% of the population of the Golan Heights, and they tended to have a high representation in science and in the white collar professions. But a few Christians remain of a much larger community that left the area. In 2010 more than 8,000 Christians lived in Druze-majority towns and cities in Israel, including Daliyat al-Karmel, Ein Qiniyye, Hurfeish, Isfiya, Kisra-Sumei, Majdal Shams, Maghar and Peki'in. Additionally, in 2016, more than 2,700 Druze lived in Rameh and Kafr Yasif, which are Christian-majority towns located in the Galilee region, and more than 12,000 Christians and 9,800 Druze lived Abu Snan and Shefa-Amr, which have a Muslim majority. Before 1948, some Druze towns such as Beitegen, Julis, Sajur and Yarka were inhabited by small Christian communities.

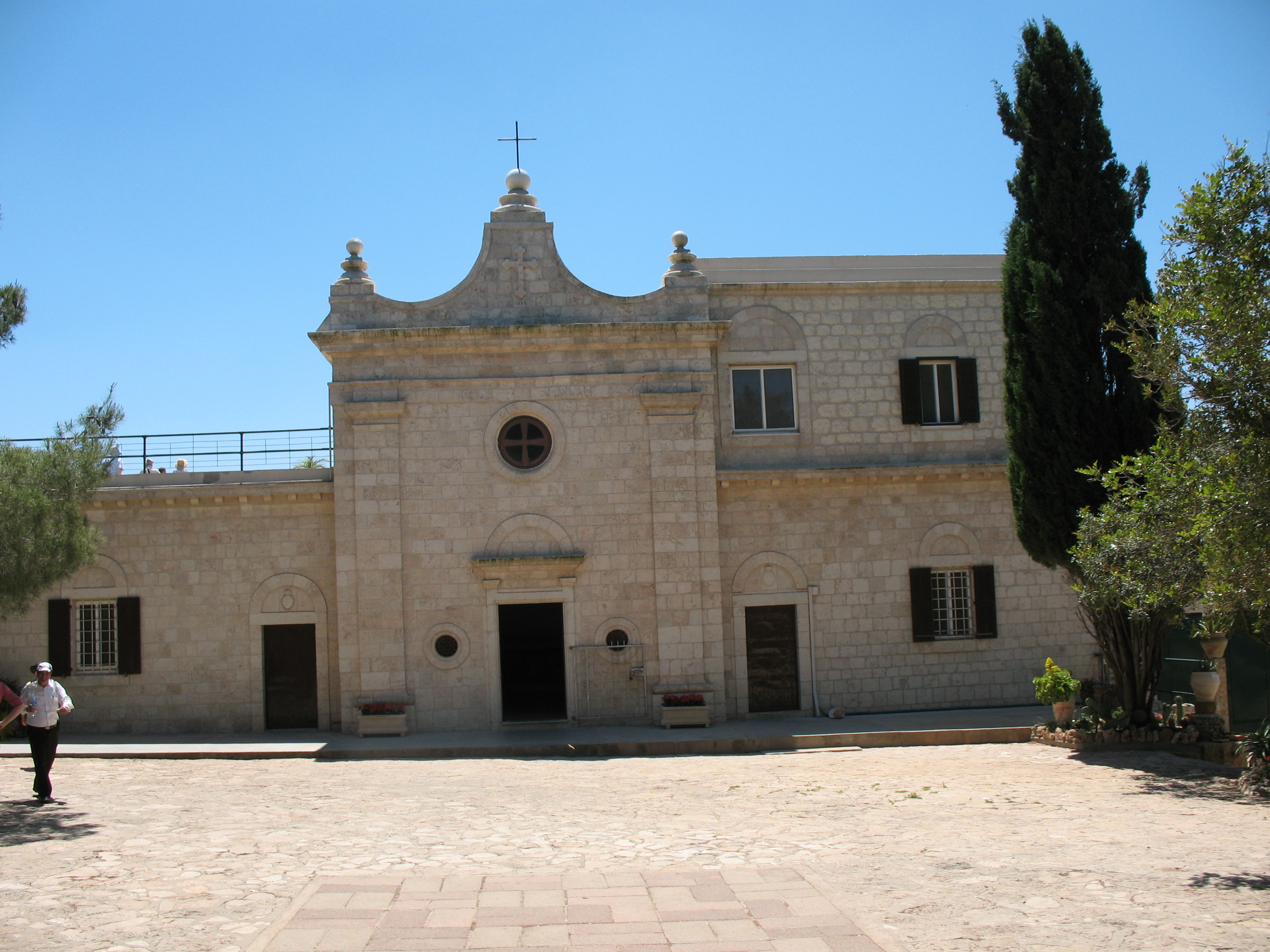
Muhraqa Carmelite Monastery in Daliyat al-Karmel is located in the largest Druze town in Israel.

The relationship between Druze and Christians in the region, especially during Druze-Maronite conflicts in the Lebanese Civil War (1975–1990), did not adversely affect the peaceful coexistence between Druze and Christians in Galilee. Rare exceptions include incidents such as the one on April 11, 1981, when a soccer match between two neighboring Arab towns escalated into violence. Kafr Yasif, predominantly Christian, played against Julis, predominantly Druze. A brawl among fans resulted in the deaths of a teenager from each town. Subsequently, residents of Julis retaliated with attacks on Kafr Yasif in the days following the match. Another sectarian incident occurred in 2005, when Druze attacked Christians in Maghar following rumors that some Christian youths had created and shared photo images of Druze girls depicted as nude models on the internet. However, clashes between the two communities are rare. Christian shops, vehicle, house and the church were vandalized. The clashes forced around 2,000 of the Christians to flee their homes. However, a police investigation revealed that a Druze youth had spread lies to his friends about the pictures, leading to the escalation of tensions. Dan Ronen the commander of Northern District commander called the violence "a pogrom".

According to Jack Khoury, the clash in Maghar may stem from animosity between the wealthier Christian population and the poorer Druze. Since in terms of their socio-economic situation, Arab Christians in Israel have high socio-economic status and are more akin to the Jewish population in this regard than to the Muslim Arab or Druze population. The local Druze community has complained that despite their sons serving in the Israeli army and police forces, the government fails to reward the Druze community adequately. Meanwhile, Christian youth receive high-quality education, secure better jobs, leading to a noticeable disparity in living standards between the two groups. Additionally, Arab Christians are among the most educated groups in Israel. Statistically, Arab Christians in Israel have the highest rates of educational attainment among all religious communities.

Many Druze and Muslims attend Christian schools in Israel, because Christian schools are high-performing and among the best schools in the country, and while those schools represent only 4% of the Arab schooling sector, about 34% of Arab university students come from Christian schools, and about 87% of the Israeli Arabs in the high tech sector have been educated in Christian schools. Moreover, a significant number of Druze students attend prestigious Christian schools such as the Orthodox Arab College-School and the Sisters of Nazareth School in Haifa, Mar Elias Educational Institutions in I'billin, the Latin Patriarchate School in Rameh, Bishop Timothy National School in Kafr Yasif, and the Melkite Catholic Episcopal School and the Sisters of Nazareth School in Shefa-Amr.

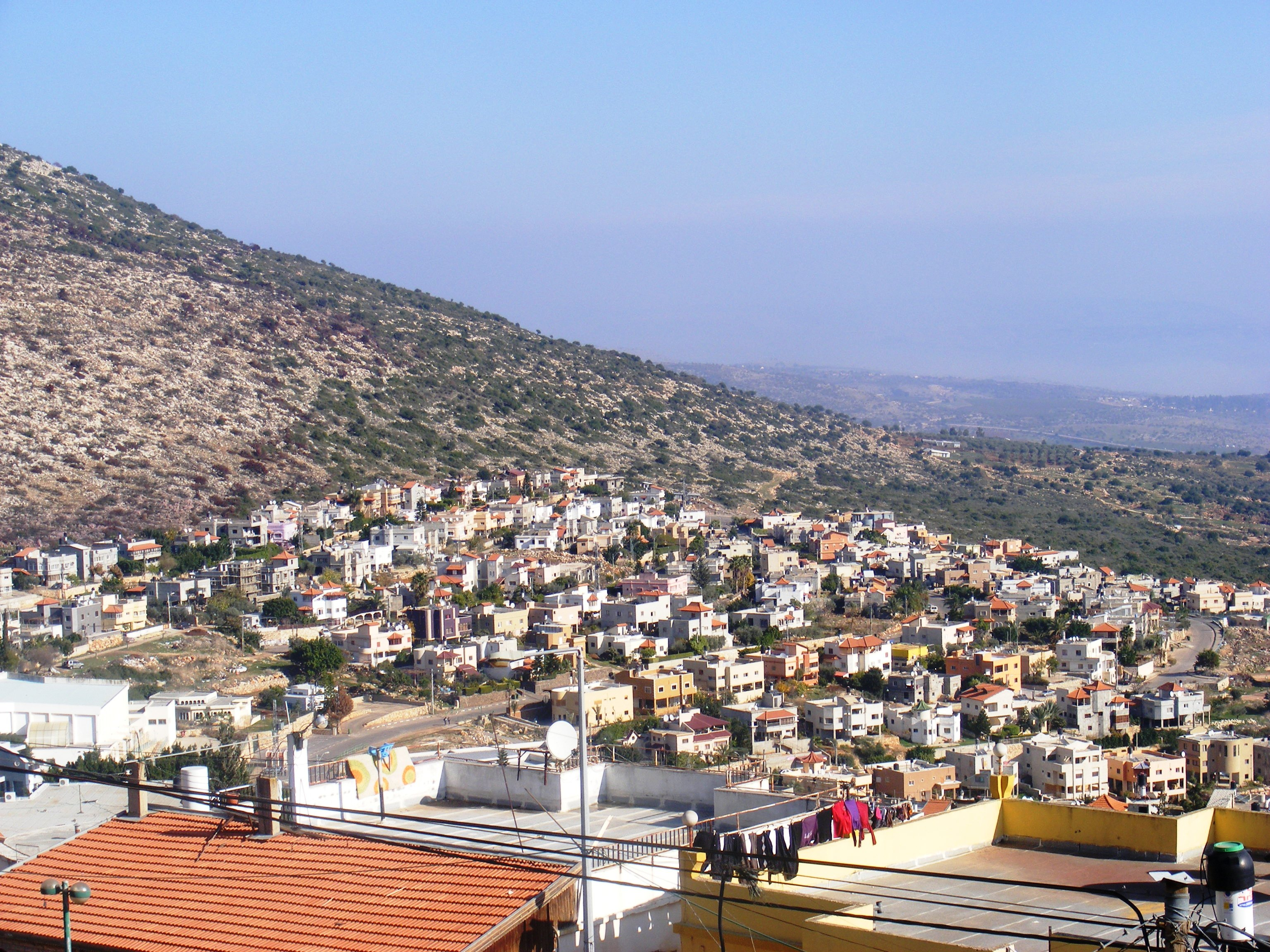
Maghar in Lower Galilee is home to significant Druze and Melkite communities.

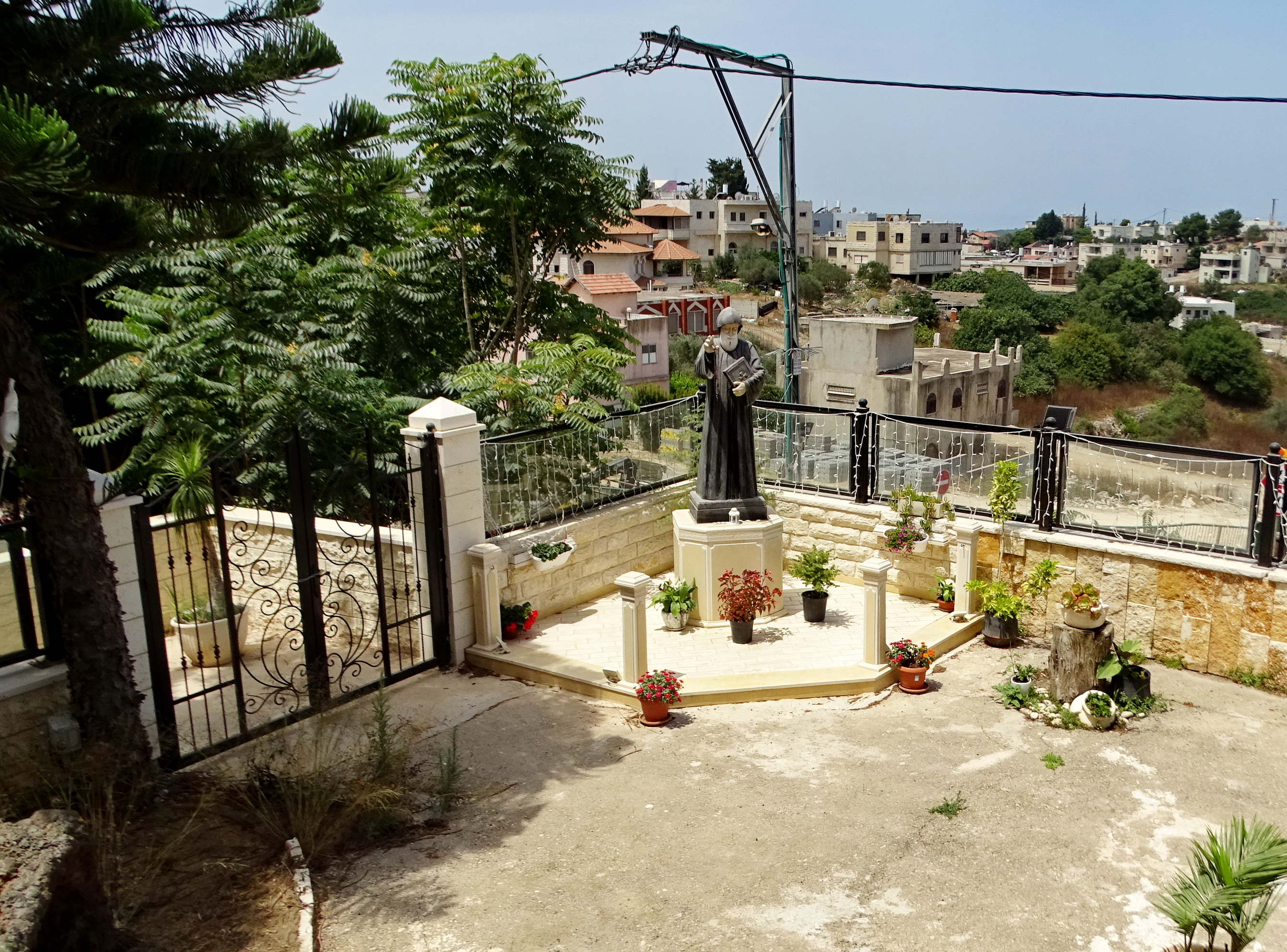
Isfiya in Mount Carmel is a Druze-majority town with significant Christian communities.

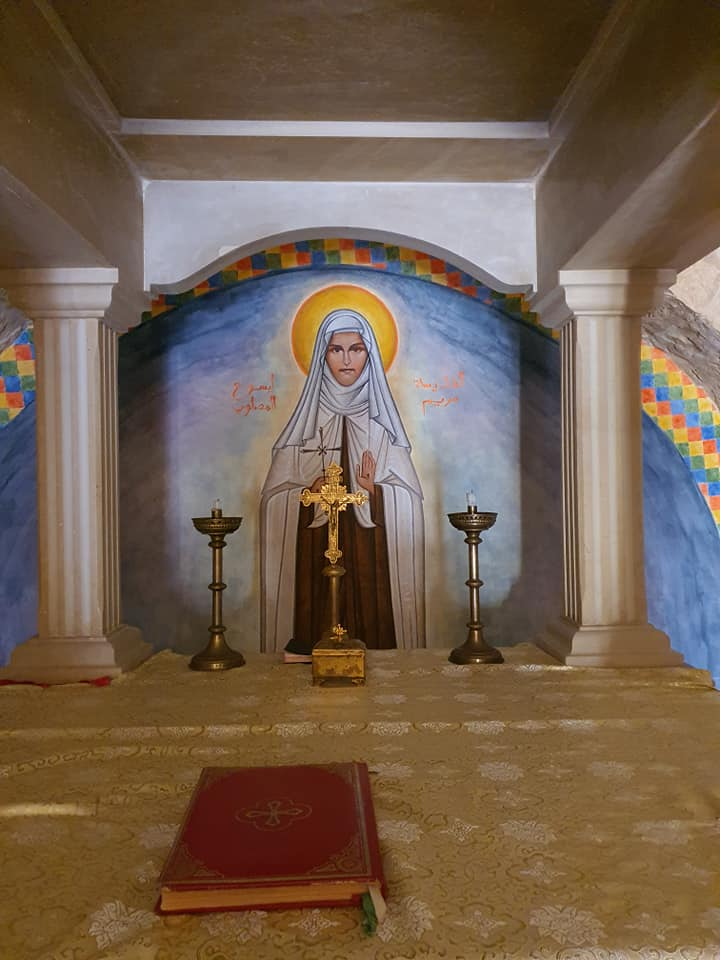
The Church of St. Mariam Baouardy in Hurfeish, Upper Galilee: a town with a mixed population of Druze and Christians

=== In the Golan Heights ===
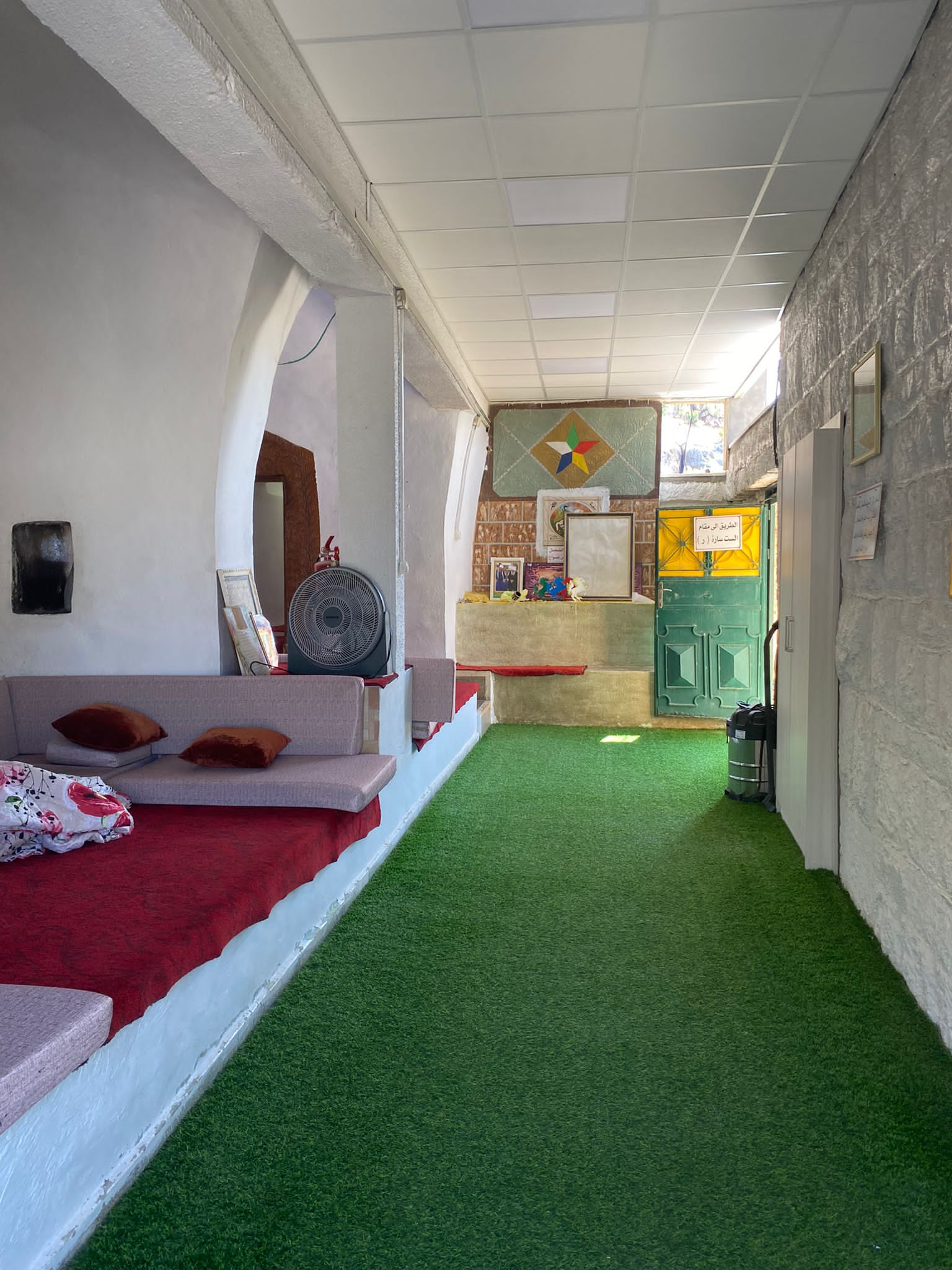
The Maqam al-Khidr (Saint George) in the Golan Heights

The Golan Heights holds significance for Christians and has been a destination for pilgrims due to biblical accounts of Jesus's visitation. This includes Confession of Peter, which took place in the city of Banias (Caesarea Philippi at the time). Following the Roman Empire's recognition of Christianity, several churches and monasteries were built in the area, and numerous Christian archaeological sites remain in the Golan, such as the Kursi and Deir Qeruh, and several ruins in Banias. Christians inhabited most villages and towns mixed with Druze in the Golan, such as Jubata ez-Zeit, Zarura, 'Ayn Fit, Haspin, Fiq, Quneitra, Ain al-Shaara, Hinah, and Arnah, in addition to Majdal Shams and Ein Qiniyye, where Christians constituted two-thirds of the population in the 19th century. These Christians were divided into several denominations, including Greek Orthodox, Maronites, Roman Catholics, and Protestants. Some Druze communities were established in the Golan during the 17th and 18th centuries.

During the French Mandate period, there was a significant migration of Christians from villages to the city of Quneitra, forming the second largest population group there after the Circassians. Majdal Shams played a significant role in the Great Syrian Revolt of 1925–1927. In October 1925, a few months after Syrian Druze had begun fighting French forces in the nearby province of Jabal al-Duruz, a group of the town's Druze residents looted local Christian property. Mandate authorities sent troops to restore order, and community leaders contacted the central command of the revolt for assistance defending the town against the French.

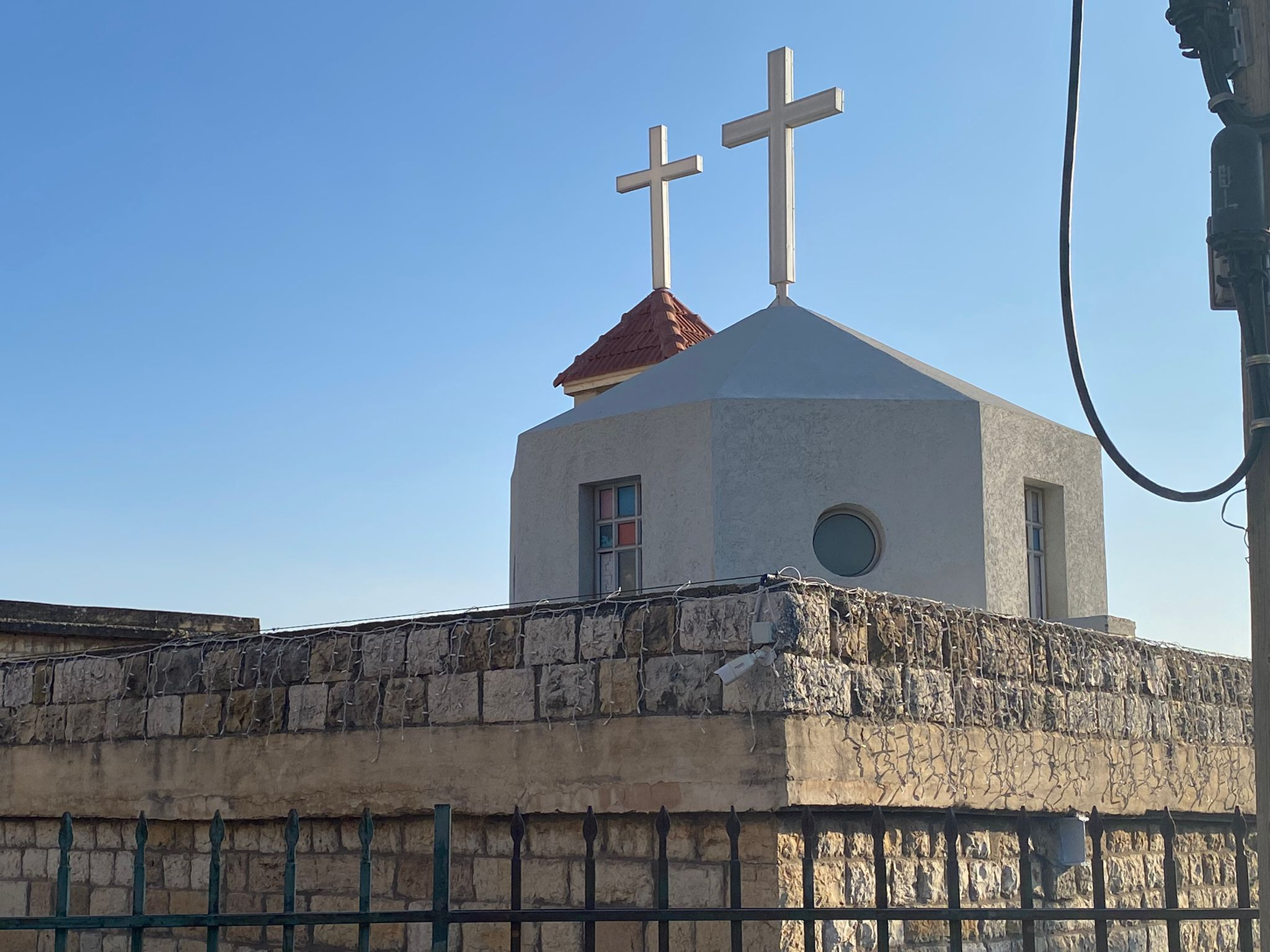
Melkite church in Ein Qiniyye, the Golan Heights

Before the 1967 war, Christians comprised 12% of the total population of the Golan, which reached 150,000 people. While Druze formed the majority of the population. Christians were involved in small-scale economic and commercial activities, classified within the petite bourgeoisie, and most were educated, with many working in professions such as medicine, law, and engineering, while the Druze mainly worked in agriculture and on the land. The vast majority of Christians migrated with the rest of the population after Israel's occupation of the Golan, leaving only a few small Christian families.

Of the four remaining Syrian Druze communities in the Israeli-occupied territories (on Israel's side of Mount Hermon and the Golan Heights), Majdal Shams is the largest, together with Ein Qiniyye, Mas'ade, and Buq'ata. As of 2017, there was one Greek Orthodox Christian family of five (the Nasrallah family) in Majdal Shams, and one Christian family of twelve (the Assaf family) in Ein Qiniyye. Only one Maronite church remains in Ein Qiniyye, along with remnants of two Melkite churches in Ein Qiniyye and one Orthodox church in Majdal Shams. The historic church of Banias remains closed despite restoration efforts. Relations between Christians and Druze in Majdal Shams and Ein Qiniyye are characterized by goodwill, peaceful coexistence, and mixing.

=== In Jordan ===
The Jordanian Druze people are estimated to number at least 20,000, as of 2005. The main areas where they live are Amman, Azraq, Zarqa, Russiefa, Umm Al-Quttein, Aqaba and Mafraq. Druze settlement in Jordan began in 1918, when 22 Druze families left Jabal al-Druze for al-Azraq following the withdrawal of the Turks from the region.

Jordan contains one of the oldest Christian communities in the world, their presence dating back to the crucifixion of Jesus Christ early in the 1st century AD. Christians today make up about 3% of the population. Jordanian Christians in a country of almost 10 million are thought to number 250,000–400,000, down from 20% in 1930, but their absolute numbers have increased. This is due to high immigration rate of Muslims into Jordan, higher emigration rates of Christians and higher birth rates for Muslims. Jordan's Arab Christians are exceptionally well integrated in the Jordanian society and enjoy a high level of freedom. Christians are allotted a minimum of 7% of the seats in the Jordanian parliament (9 out of 130 seats), significantly greater than their percentage of the total Jordanian population. They form a significant part of the kingdom's political and economic elite.

In Amman, Zarqa, Russiefa, Umm Al-Quttein, Aqaba, and Mafraq there are Christian and Druze communities coexisting with the Sunni Muslim majority. Many Druze and Muslims attend Christian schools in these areas, where students from Christian, Druze, and Muslim backgrounds study and socialize together.

=== In Venezuela ===
Arab immigration to Venezuela started as early as the 19th and 20th centuries, with migrants primarily hailing from the Ottoman provinces of Lebanon, Syria, and Palestine. They settled predominantly in Caracas, and have significantly influenced Venezuelan culture, particularly in terms of Arabic food and music. Religiously, the Arab-Venezuelans community consists mainly of Druze and Christians, who are affiliated with the Roman Catholic, Eastern Orthodox and Eastern Rite Catholic Churches.

Venezuela hosts the largest Druze communities outside the Middle East, estimated at around 60,000 individuals. Most of them trace their ancestry back to Lebanon and Syria. More than 200,000 people from the As-Suwayda area hold Venezuelan citizenship, the majority of whom belong to the Syria's Druze sect and immigrated to Venezuela in the past century.

The early Druze migrants to Venezuela assimilated well into the local population, with some even converting Catholicism. Nevertheless, many retained a strong Druze and Arab identity, along with adherence to Druze values. A prominent example of Druze influence in this Catholic country is the former vice president, Tareck El Aissami, who is of Druze descent. Other notable Venezuelan figures of Druze origin include Haifa El Aissami and Tarek William Saab.

== Intercommunal relationships ==
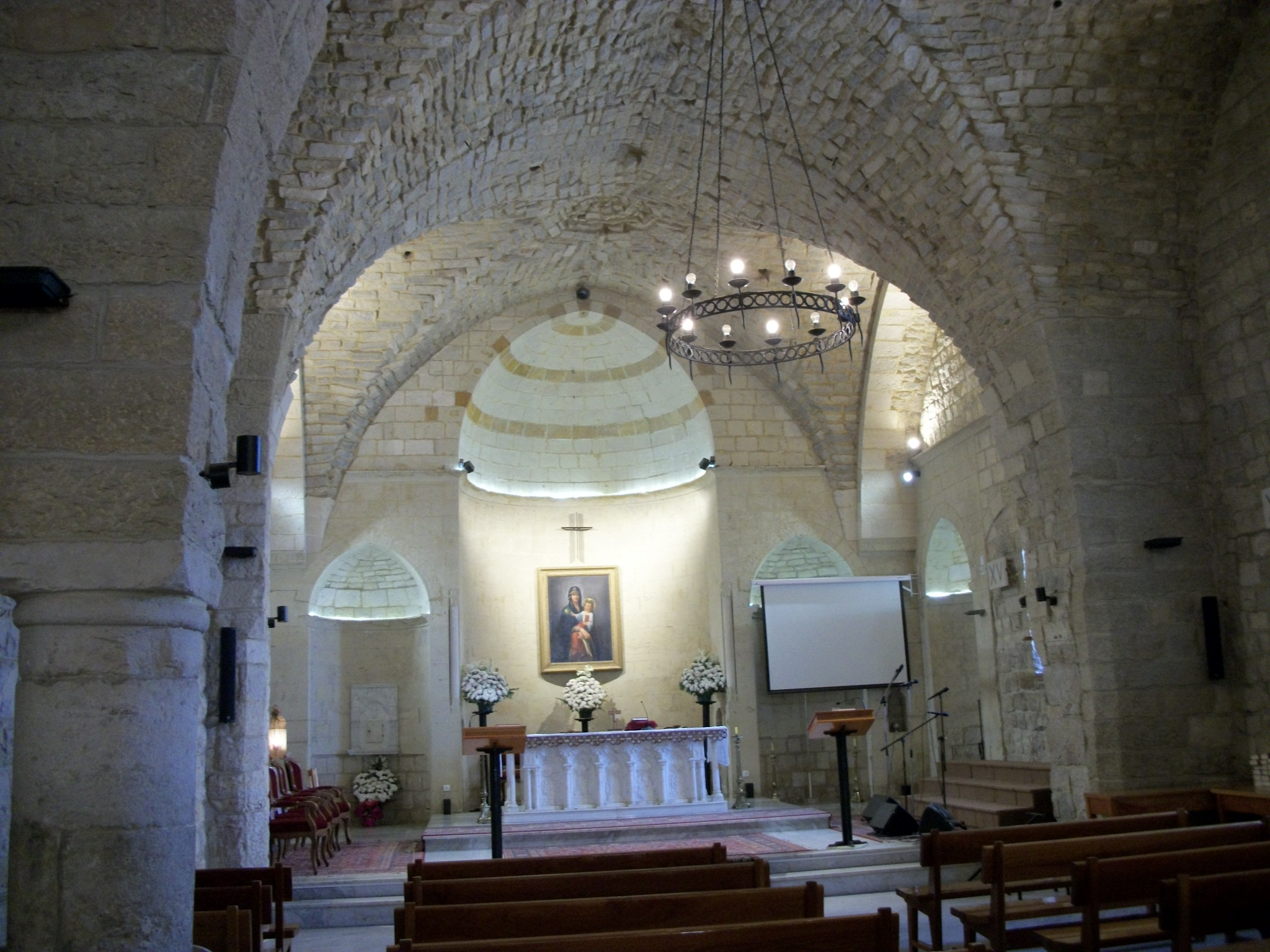
Church of Saidet et Tallé in Deir al-Qamar was rebuilt during the reign of the Druze Ma'n dynasty.

The Christian and Druze communities have a long history of interaction dating back roughly a millennium, particularly in Mount Lebanon. Over the centuries, they have peacefully interacted and lived together, sharing common social and cultural landscapes, although occasional exceptions have occurred. This interaction been marked by shared economic activities, cultural exchange, and even political alliances in some cases. The two communities lived among each other and interacted socially on an everyday basis. The close bonds between Christian and Druze neighbors led to Christian communities thriving in some Druze towns.

According to some scholars, historically, Druze communities had better relationships with Christians than with Muslims. They also points out that Christians tended to show more tolerance towards the Druze community and their religion compared to Muslims. Traditionally, Druze settlements in the Levant often included Christian families and communities, while Muslim presence was rare.

=== In Mount Lebanon ===
The "Druze-Christian alliance" during the Emirate of Mount Lebanon, from the mid-16th to the early-19th century, and the "Maronite-Druze dualism" in Mount Lebanon Mutasarrifate from the 19th to the 20th centuries, laid the foundation for what is now Lebanon. This is celebrated as establishing a kind of Druze-Maronite condominium, often depicted as the precursor of Lebanese statehood and Lebanese national identity. While Lebanese nationalism appeals to the Lebanese Maronite and Druze communities, it is generally unpopular among Lebanese Muslims, who often support Pan-Arabism and Pan-Islamism, as well as among Greek Orthodox Christians.

Druze author Yusuf Khatat Abu Shaqra, in his book Movements in Lebanon, stated: "In the past, there was no discord or estrangement between the Druze and Christians in Lebanon, as there has been since the year 1800. Instead, the two communities had affection for one another, were friendly, and, in other words, operated as one group, working together in harmony".

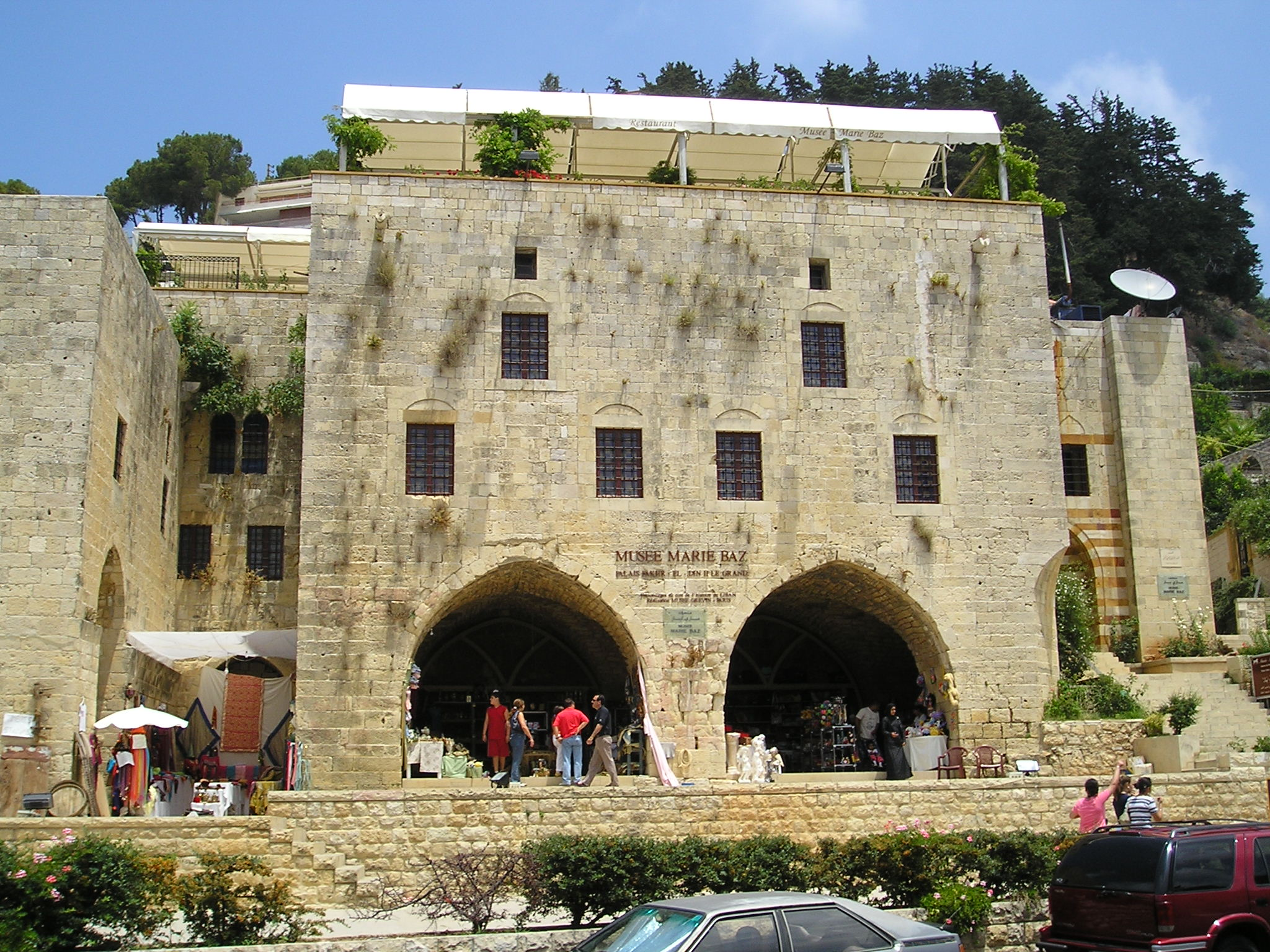
Deir al-Qamar, the capital of Emirate of Mount Lebanon, established a sort of Druzes–Maronite condominium.

Lebanese historian Philip K. Hitti commented on the relationship between the Druze and Christians in Lebanon, noting: "Folty Comte, a French scholar, was astonished by the remarkable similarity between the Druze and the Maronites (Christians) in their way of life, system of governance, dialect, customs, and public morals. Druze and Maronite families coexist harmoniously, and sometimes Maronites accompany their Druze neighbors to church".

According to Hitti, the Druze believe in the efficacy of holy water blessed by a priest, and occasionally, if a missionary persists in evangelizing the Druze, they may accept the sacrament of baptism. Maretti, an Italian monk who visited the region in 1760, just before Folty's arrival, observed that the Druze show genuine affection and respect for Christians and their religion. He also noted that Druze pray in Greek Orthodox churches as they do in Turkish mosques.

Historian Ray Jabre Mouawad observes that during the Ottoman period, there existed religious symbiosis between the Druze and Christians in Mount Lebanon. This period saw numerous cultural interactions, leading to shared symbols, the veneration of common saints, and the adoption of common terminology to refer to God. Evidence of these interactions can be found in the palaces and mausoleums of Druze leaders, as well as in Maronite and Greek Orthodox churches.

According to scholar Pierre-Yves Beaurepaire, due to the Christian influence on the Druze faith, two Christian saints become the Druze's favorite venerated figures: Saint George and the Prophet Elijah. Thus, in all the villages inhabited by the Druze and Christians in central Mount Lebanon, a Christian church or Druze maqam is dedicated to either the Prophet Elijah or Saint George. The Druze environment influenced Christians living among them, and they started to use the same word for their churches, calling them maqām instead of kanīsah.

Nour Fara Haddad, a scholar of religious anthropology, states that Christian pilgrimage sites associated with revered figures among Christians, Druze, and Muslims—such as shrines dedicated to the Virgin Mary, Saint George, or the Prophet Elijah—served as pilgrimage destinations for Christians, Muslims, and Druze alike. Even during conflicts, such as the civil conflict in 1860, these Christian shrines remained places where people from different religious backgrounds could meet and interact.

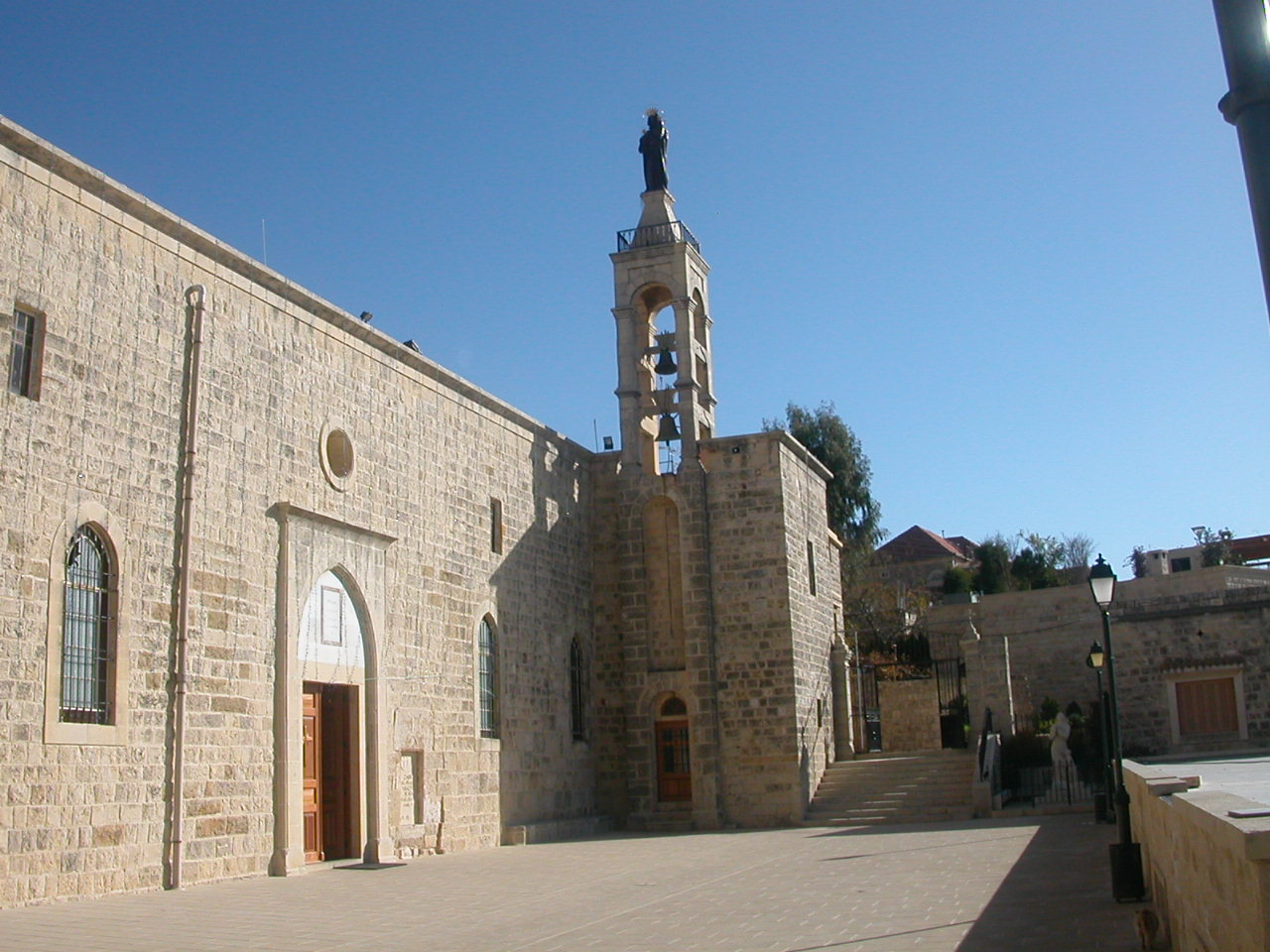
Church of Saidet et Tallé, also known as the "Church of the Virgin of the Druze"

The Church of Saidet et Tallé in Deir el Qamar is one of the most significant historical and religious sites in Mount Lebanon. The original church was destroyed by the Saracens and later rebuilt during the reign of Fakhreddine I Maan (1518-1544). For centuries, this church has been revered by both Druze and Christians in Mount Lebanon, reflecting the close ties between the two communities. According to Pierre-Marie Martin, writing in 1870, the Druze venerated the church even more than the Maronites, often traveling long distances to pray to the Virgin Mary in their own way and "witnessing numerous miracles". Historian Glenn Bowman further highlights that in the early nineteenth century, Druze leaders would seek the Virgin Mary's favor at Saidet et Tallé before going into battle. They would touch the image of the Virgin Mary with their flags and place dust from under the altar in their turbans. The profound veneration of this church by the Druze led local Maronites to dub it the "Church of the Virgin of the Druze".

Since the sixteenth century, prominent Druze feudal families have welcomed Protestant missionaries, as well as, Catholic missionaries like Franciscans, Jesuits, Carmelites, and Lazarites to the region, all of whom contributed to the spread of education and literacy. Several feudal Druze families also funded the construction of churches in their strongholds. For example, the Jumblatt family sponsored the building of the Maronite Church of Our Lady of Durra in Mukhtara, and the Arslan family supported construction of the Saint Michael the Archangel Orthodox Church in Choueifat. Educated generations of Maronite commoners took up positions as scribes, clerks, physicians, and household agents in the service of notables, including both Maronite and Druze feudal families, such as the Jumblatt family.

=== In Jabal al-Druze ===
According to expert Fabrice Balanche, during the 18th and 19th centuries, there were significant migrations of Druze from Mount Lebanon to Jabal Hauran, which eventually became known as Jabal al-Druze ('mountain of the Druze'). The region also had sizable integrated Christian communities that had coexisted with the Druze for centuries, living in harmony with them.

Historian Kais Firro asserts that in Hauran, during the 18th and 19th centuries, Christians welcomed the arrival of new Druze immigrants as allies in repelling invasions by Bedouin clans. He also observes that prior to Syrian independence, Christian villages in Hauran enjoyed protection from Druze clans, such as Al-Hamdan and Al-Atrash, shielding them from frequent attacks by Bedouins from neighboring regions.

Frederick J. Bliss notes that, to avoid Turkish military service, some Druze claimed to be Protestants. A French officer stationed in Houran confirmed that if aristocratic Druze families lost a child, they would baptize the next-born child. The second son of Sultan al-Atrash was baptized in 1924. These practices reflect piety, and it's not uncommon for a Druze living in a predominantly Christian villages to contribute financially to the local church.

Many Armenians who escaped Anatolia during the Armenian genocide sought refuge in Houran and Jabal al-Druze, where they received additional support from the Druze community. The Druze of Houran and Jabal al-Druze provided shelter and defense to Armenian refugees. According to survivor testimonies, during the Arab Revolt and the Armenian genocide, Sultan al-Atrash was involved in rescuing Armenian refugees.

=== In Galilee ===
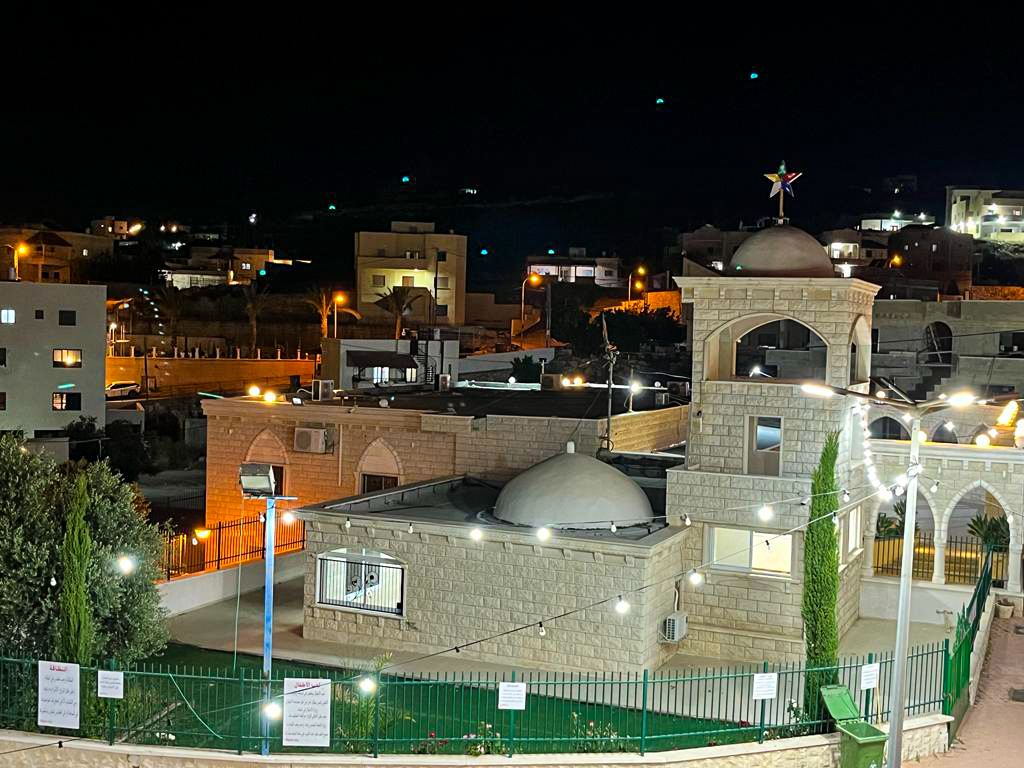
Maqam al-Khadr (Saint George), Kafr Yasif

Before the establishment of the State of Israel in 1948, the Druze lived in the Galilee and Mount Carmel, either in exclusively Druze villages or in villages mixed with Christians, where they had coexisted for centuries. Historically, the relationship between the Druze and their Christian neighbors was better compared to their relationship with their Muslim neighbors in neighboring villages. According to historian Ilan Pappé, during the 1948 Arab–Israeli War, in villages partly inhabited by Druze, Christians were generally exempt from expulsion.

According to Pappé, in 1948, Israeli military rulers gathered Christians in the centers of several villages in the Galilee region, planning to deport them. However, Druze village leaders intervened, insisting that all Christians remain in their homes. They utilized all their influence and resources to ensure that the Christian residents could stay. The Galilean village of Rameh, with a Christian majority, was not displaced because of its large Druze population. While the "divide and rule" policy succeeded with the Druze, who were promised immunity, weapons, and privileges, by the Zionist militias, the Palestinian Christian communities were less "cooperative".

Israeli Druze and Muslims have comparable socio-economic standards when compared to their wealthier and more educated Israeli Christian counterparts. Despite rare exceptions of sectarian incidents between the more privileged Christian community and the Druze, scholar Ibtisam Ibrahim's research reveals that most Druze interviewees view their relationship with the Christian community more positively than with the Muslim community. Ibrahim also observes that, unlike other Israeli Christians and Muslims, Druze place less emphasis on their Arab identity and identify more as Israeli. However, they are less inclined to form personal relationships with Jews compared to Israeli Muslims and Christians, a trend Ibrahim attributes to cultural differences between Jews and Druze.

=== Relations between the Druzes and the Holy See ===
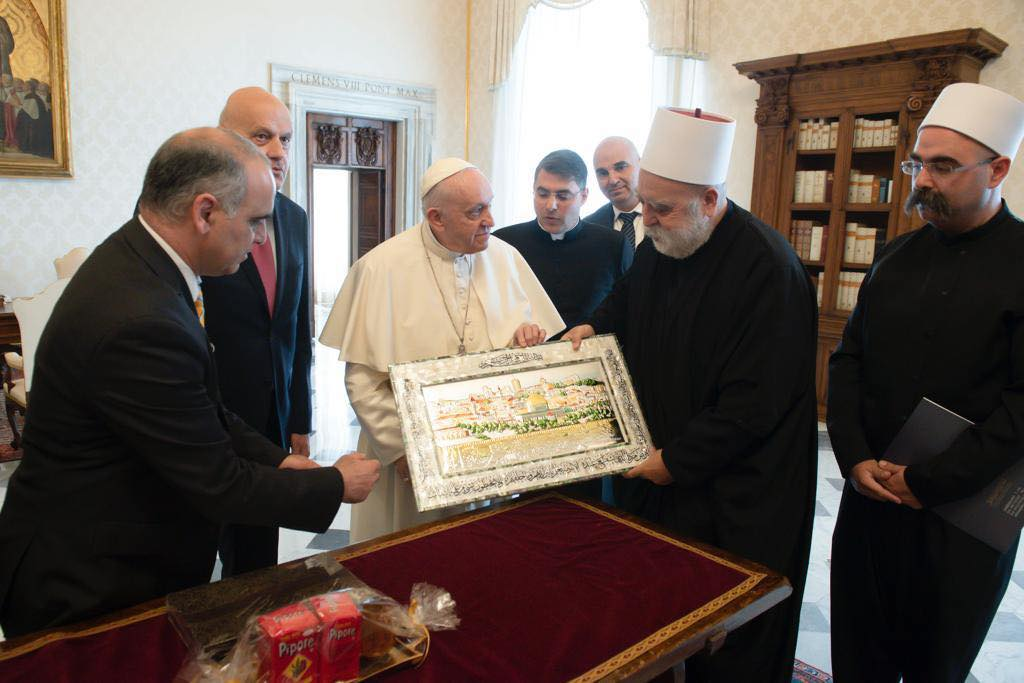
In 2022, Israeli Druze delegation visited the Vatican City and met with Pope Francis.

The relationship between the Druze and the Holy See dates back to the Crusades. In the 15th century, the Holy See sought to extend its relations with various non-Catholic communities in the Orient, in particular, the Druze. As early as 1441, Papal delegate Antoine de Troya led a joint Maronite-Druze delegation to Rome. In a 1610 letter, Pope Paul V entrusted Fakhr al-Din II with the protection of the Maronite community. Fakhr al-Din II, a prominent Druze leader of the early 17th century, spent a period of exile in Livorno, Italy. He stayed in the apartment of the late Pope Leo X in the Palazzo Vecchio during his visits to Florence. In 1761, Pope Benedict XIV sent a letter of gratitude to Ali Jumblatt for facilitating the work of Roman Catholic religious orders in Mount Lebanon and the Chouf. In 1791, Pope Pius VI sent a letter to Bashir Jumblatt, expressing gratitude for allowing the Maronites to build more churches in the Chouf area. However, during periods of civil war when the Druze and Christians (mostly Maronites) clashed, the Vatican expressed its displeasure with Druze leaders and naturally aided Christian groups.

Today, relations between the Holy See and Druze religious institutions are positive, characterized by meetings and interfaith dialogues. This relationship is also reflected in the Eastern Catholic Churches, such as the Maronite Church and the Melkite Catholic Church, whose followers have coexisted with the Druze for centuries. During visits to the Middle East by Pope John Paul II, Pope Benedict XVI, and Pope Francis, they met with Druze religious leaders alongside leaders of other faiths. The Vatican Library houses several Druze manuscripts, mainly volumes of the Epistles of Wisdom (Rasa'il al-Hikmah), dating back to the 10th and 11th centuries.

In modern times, Druze religious and political delegations have made visits to the Vatican City. Mowafaq Tarif, the spiritual leader of the Druze in Israel, attended the funerals of Pope John Paul II in 2005 and Pope Benedict XVI in 2023, representing the Druze community. In 2022, Mowafaq Tarif visited the Vatican City and met with Pope Francis. During this meeting, both leaders emphasized the importance of religious coexistence between Christians and Druze. They also stressed the need for religious organizations active in Syria and Lebanon to provide and intensify humanitarian aid to all populations and regions, including Druze areas.

== Religious conversion ==
=== Conversion to Christianity from Druze faith ===
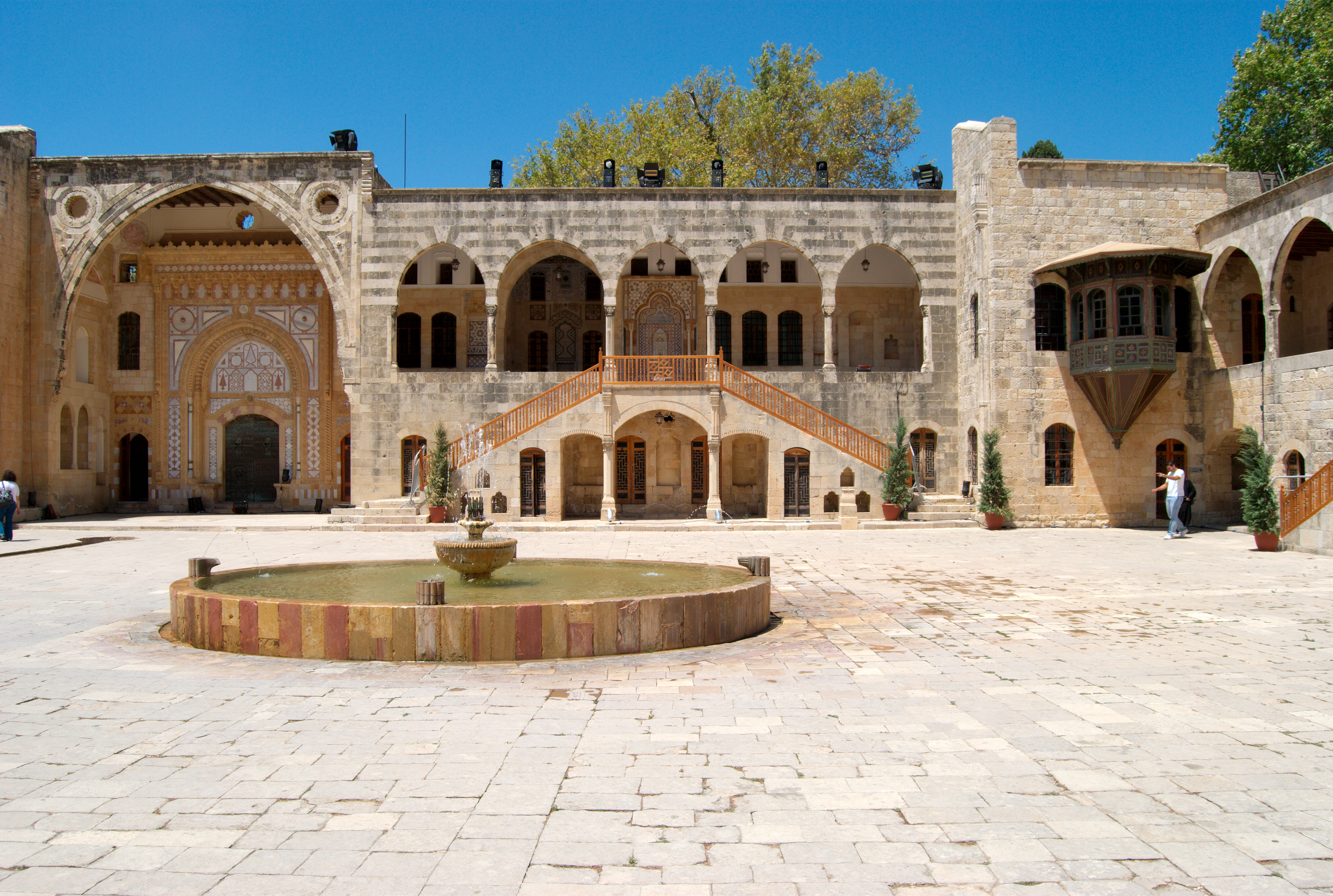
Beiteddine Palace in Chouf: Over the centuries, a number of prominent Druze clans embraced Christianity, such as the Abi-Lamma clan.

Conversion of Druze to Christianity used to be common practice in the Levant region. Over the centuries, a number prominent Druze embraced Christianity, such as some of Shihab dynasty members, as well as the Abi-Lamma clan. Since emir Bashir III was among the Shehab princes who converted to Christianity at an earlier time, the Druze considered him an apostate, a traitor to the Druze community in particular. The Abu'l-Lama family and clan, originally of Tanukh descent, ruled over Lebanon's Metn region during the seventeenth and eighteenth centuries. Initially adherents of the Druze faith, the Abu'l-Lama sheikhs and clan members later converted to Christianity and joined the Maronite Church at the beginning of the eighteenth century. The clan constructed numerous palaces and structures, many of which still stand today in the Metn region and Mount Lebanon. After converting to Christianity, many of Abu'l-Lama clan members assumed the position of qaimmaqam of the Christians in Lebanon during the Ottoman period. Among them was emir Haydar Ahmad Abu al-Lamaʿ, who served as the qāʾim maqām of the largely Christian northern district.

During the nineteenth and twentieth centuries, Protestant missionaries established schools and churches in Druze strongholds, with some Druze converting to Protestant Christianity; yet they did not succeed to convert Druze to Christianity en masse. On the other hand, many Druze immigrants to the United States converted to Protestantism, becoming communicants of the Presbyterian or Methodist Churches. There are also a few thousand Druze immigrants from Lebanon in the United States of America, who have converted to Christianity. In the period of Egyptian rule in the Levant in the 1830s, many Druze converted to Christianity to avoid enlistment into the Egyptian army. The baptism of children in accordance with Christian custom was usual in large, well-known Lebanese Druze families, according to historian Aharon Layish there is also explicit evidence of Druzes in Lebanon under the Ottoman rule were posing Christians for practical reasons. The early Druze migrants from Levant to Venezuela tended to mix well with the local population, and some Druze converted to Catholicism.

By one estimate made by Elisabe Granli from University of Oslo, around 1,920 Syrian Druze converted to Christianity; according to the same study, Christians with a Druze background (Druze converts to Christianity) still regard themselves as Druze, and claim that there is no contradiction between being Druze and being Christian. According to the Druze religious courts, between 1952 and 2009, around 10% of Israeli Druze who left the Druze faith converted to Christianity.

According to Open Doors, there is a small but growing community of Druze converts to Christianity in Syria and Lebanon, with most converting to Evangelical Protestantism. These converts have established churches specifically for Christians of Druze background, primarily comprising women, girls, and young men who have abandoned the Druze religion they were raised in. These churches provide a space for worship and community support for those who have left the Druze faith.

Prominent converts from the Druze faith to Christianity include: Mohamed Alí Seineldín, Nada Nadim Prouty, Selwa Carmen Showker "Lucky" Roosevelt, and others.

=== Conversion to Druze faith ===
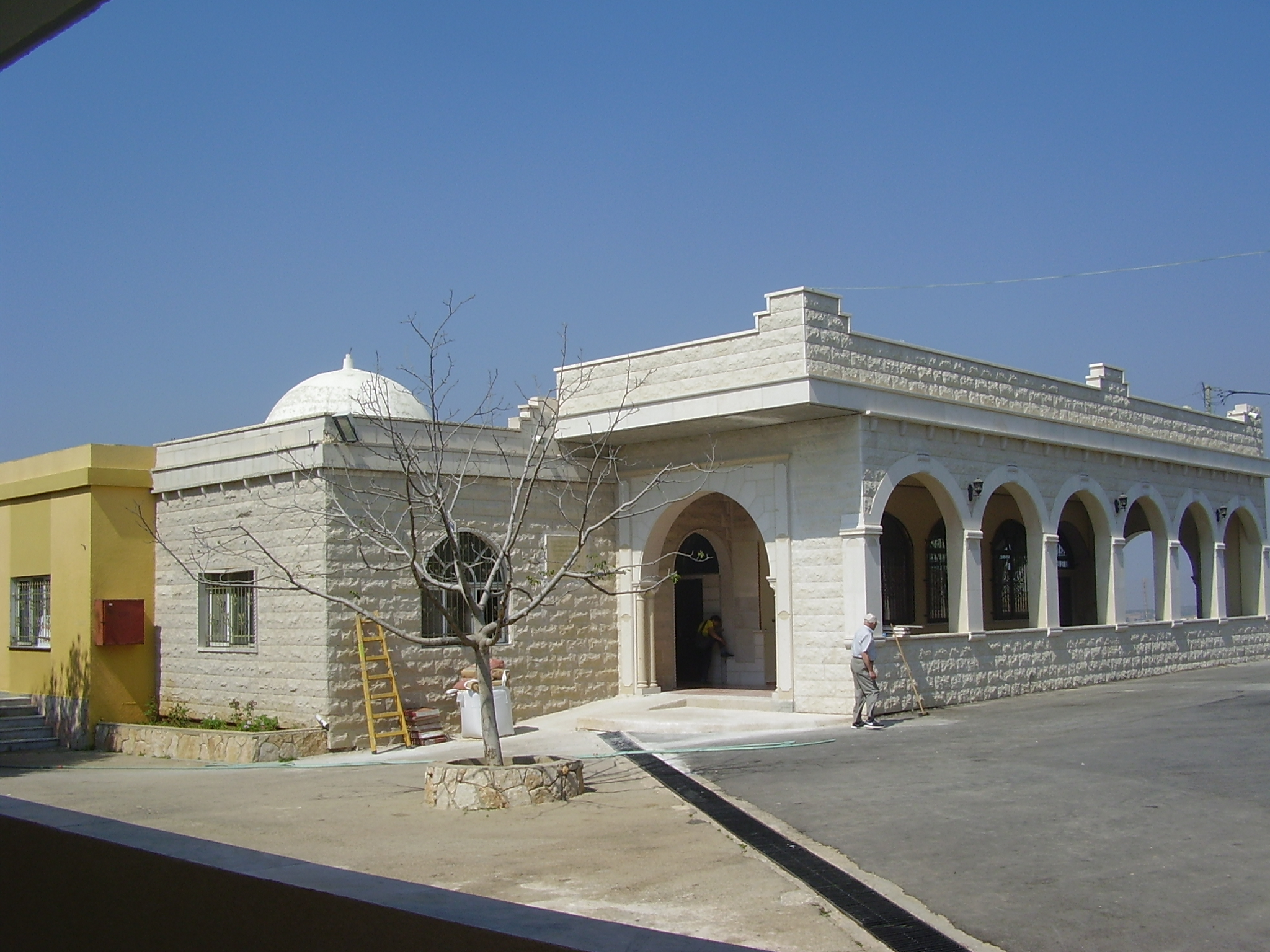
Shrine of Baha al-Din in the Druze village of Beitegen, Israel

The Druze faith extended to many areas in the Middle East, but most of the modern Druze can trace their origin to the Wadi al-Taym in Southern Lebanon, which is named after an Arab tribe Taym Allah (or Taym Allat) which, according to Islamic historian al-Tabari, first came from the Arabian Peninsula into the valley of the Euphrates where they had been Christianized, and embraced Monophysite Christianity, prior to their migration into Lebanon. Many of the Druze feudal families, whose genealogies have been preserved by the two modern Syrian chroniclers Haydar al-Shihabi and Ahmad Faris al-Shidyaq, seem also to point in the direction of this origin. Arabian tribes emigrated via the Persian Gulf and stopped in Iraq on their route that would later to lead them to Syria. The first feudal Druze family, the Tanukhids, which made for itself a name in fighting the Crusaders was, according to Haydar al-Shihabi, an Arab tribe from Mesopotamia where it occupied the position of a ruling family and apparently was Christianized before they subscribed to the Druze religion.

Since closing of the unitarian call, the Druze do not accept converts to their faith. In 1043, Baha al-Din al-Muqtana; one of the main leaders of the Druze religion, declared that the sect would no longer accept new adherents, and since that time, proselytism has been prohibited, awaiting al-Hakim's return on Judgement day to usher in a new golden age. Al-Muqtana's epistles comprise four of the six books of the Druze scripture, the Epistles of Wisdom. This marked the end of the Druze "divine call", i.e., its active missionary phase. Since then, the Druze have been a closed community, in which neither conversion nor apostasy is allowed. Marriage outside the Druze faith is forbidden and is strongly discouraged, and if a Druze marries a non-Druze, the Druze could be ostracized and marginalized by their community. Because a non-Druze partner cannot convert to Druze faith, a couple consisting of a Druze and non-Druze partner cannot have Druze children; the religion can only be passed onto a child born to two Druze parents.

== Gallery ==
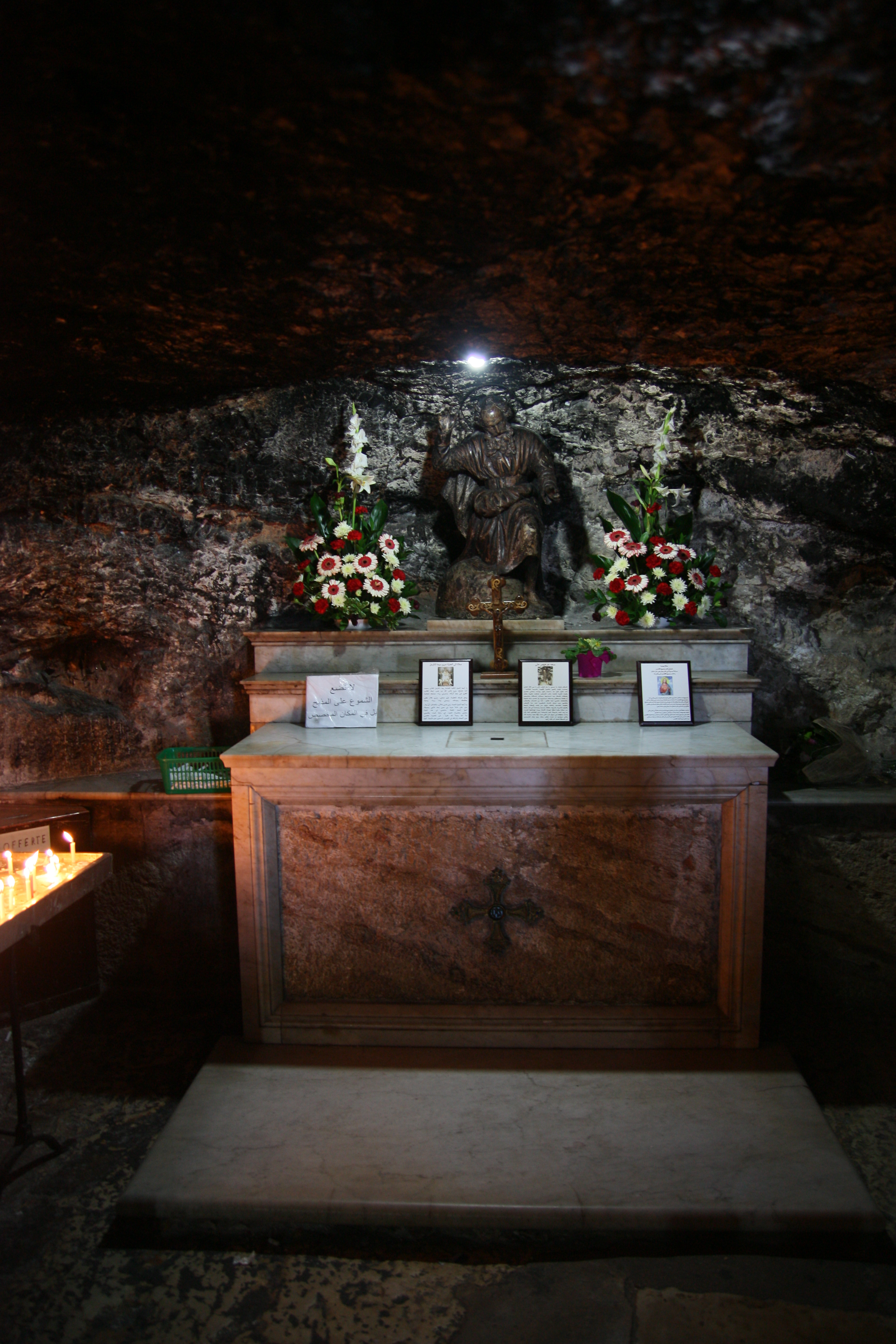
One cave associated with Elijah, on Mount Carmel in Haifa: Venerated by Christians and Druze

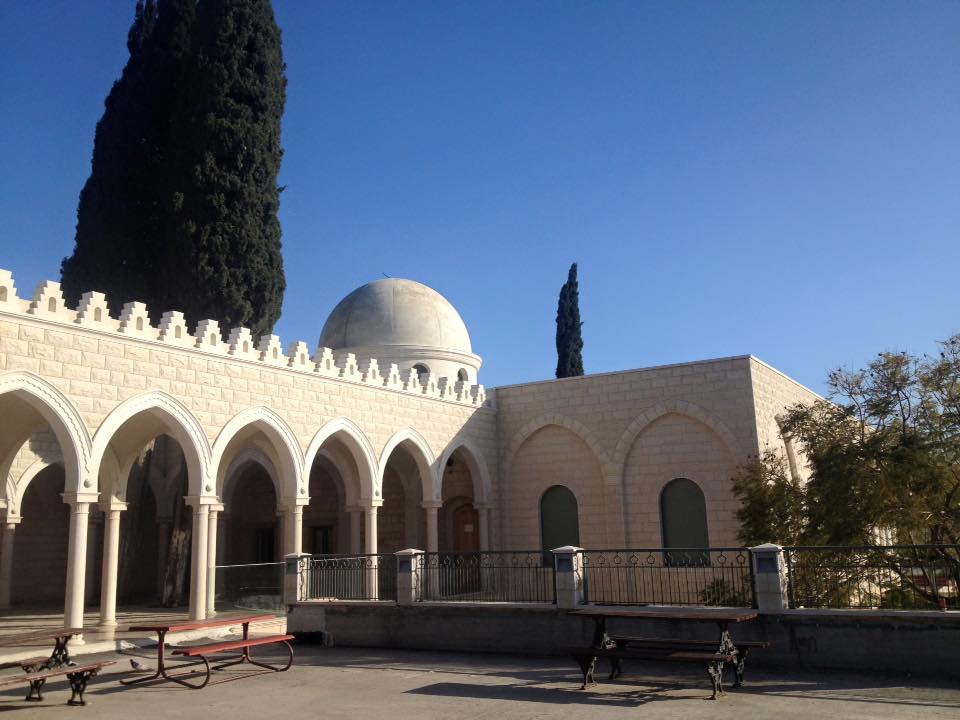
Maqam Al-Khidr in Kafr Yasif, Israel: Druze identify Saint George as "al-Khidr".

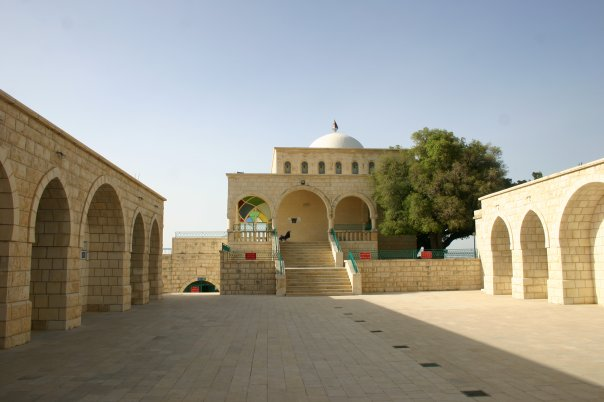
An outer view of the Druze shrine of Prophet Job in Niha village, Lebanon: Both religions venerate Job.

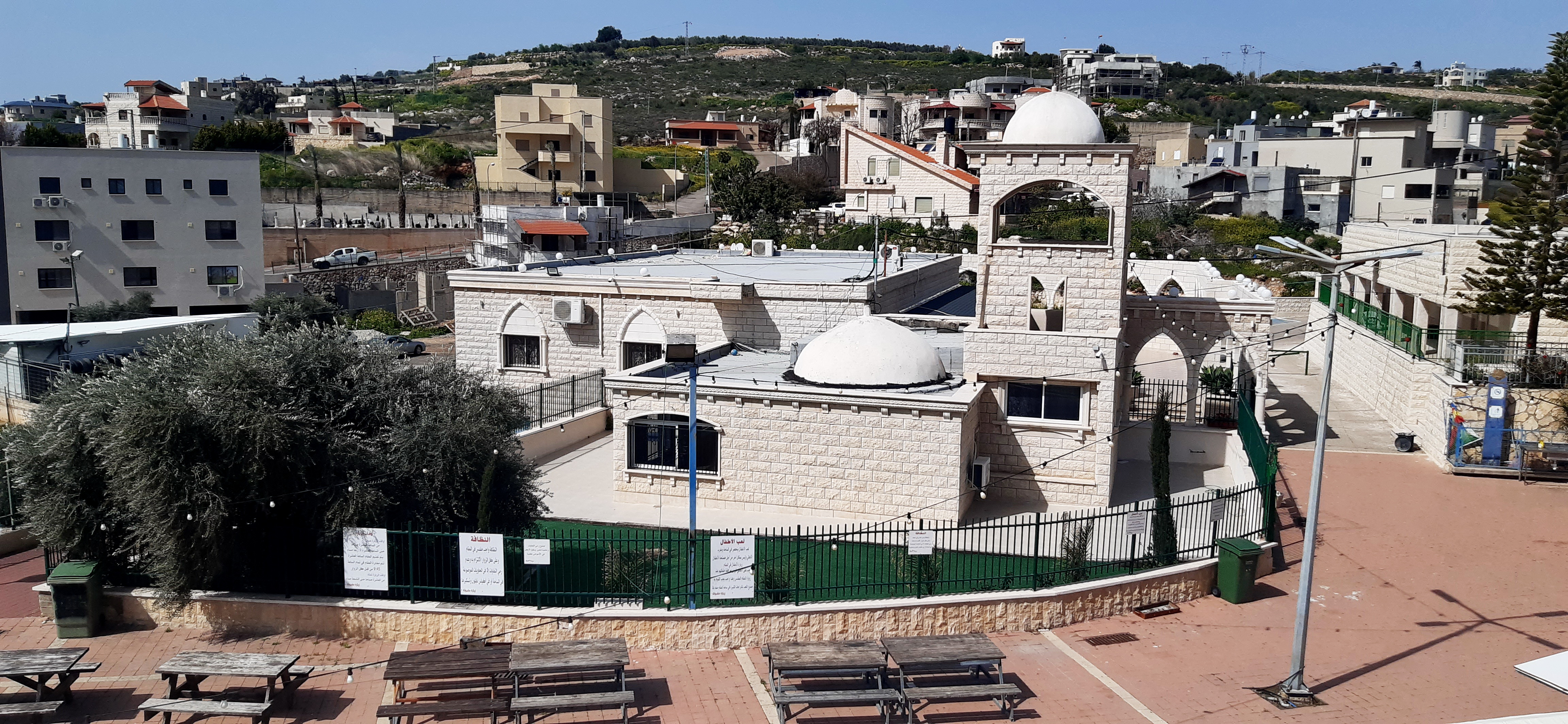
Maqam Nabi Zakaria (Zechariah) at Abu Snan

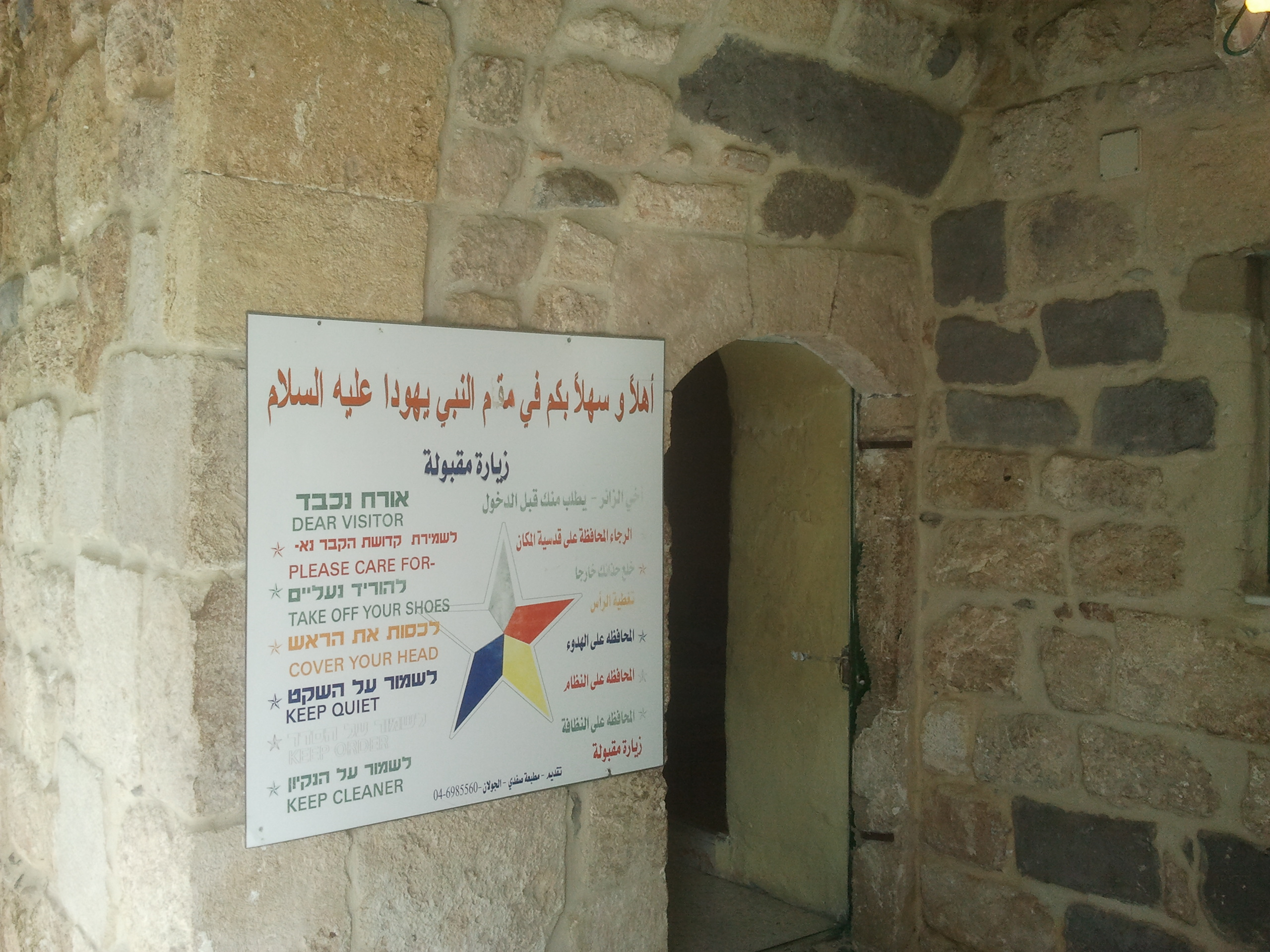
Nebi Yehuda (Judah "son of Jacob") grave in Hula Valley

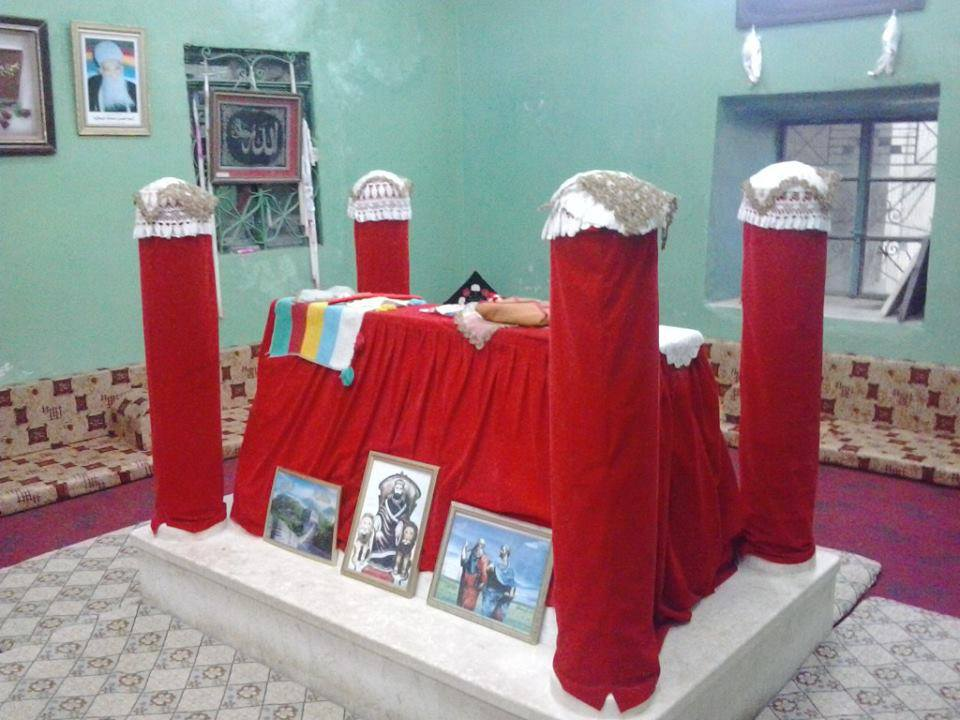
The Druze Maqam al-Nabi Yahya (John the Baptist) in As-Suwayda Governorate

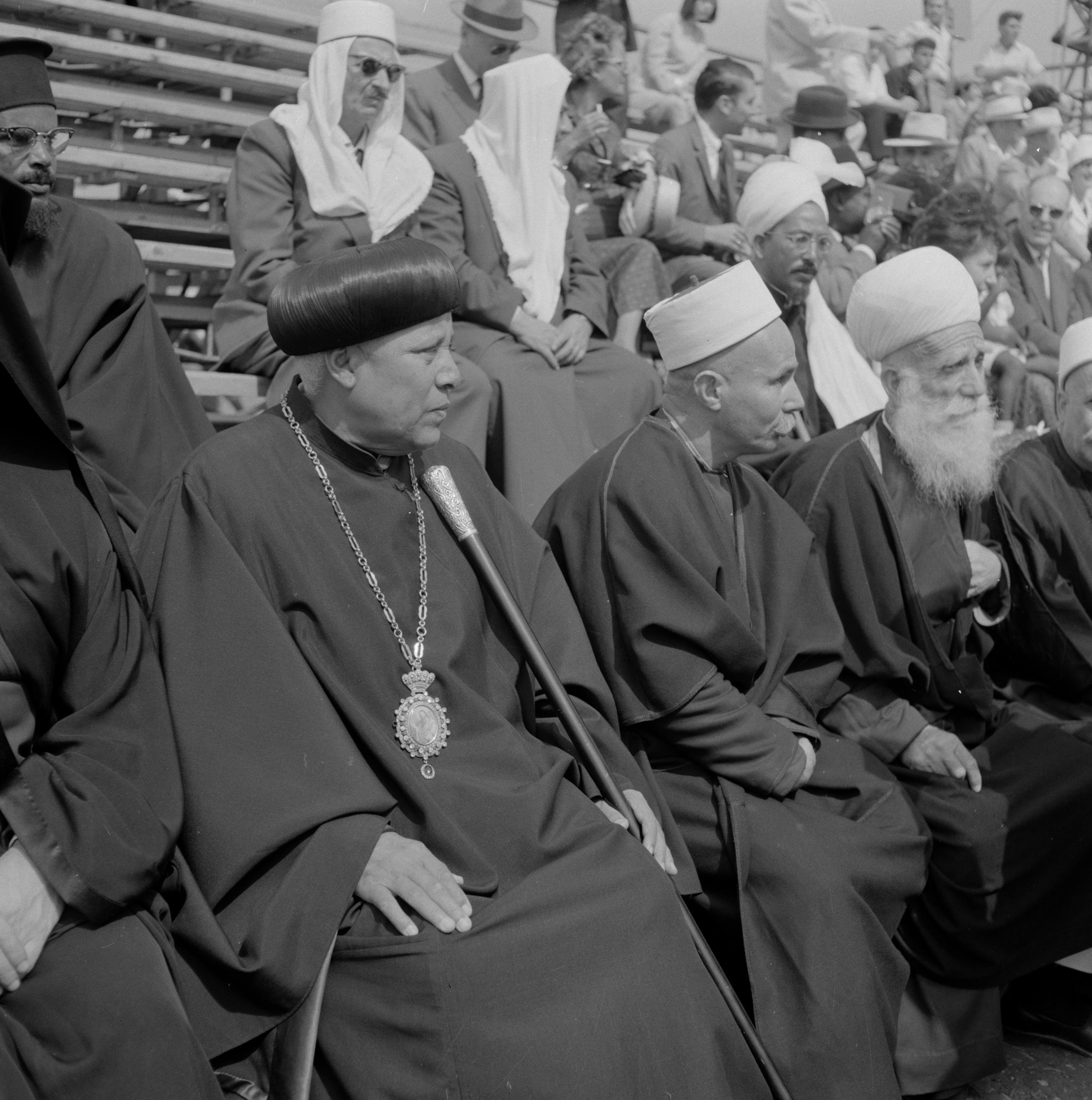
Druze and Christian clerics in Israel (1962)

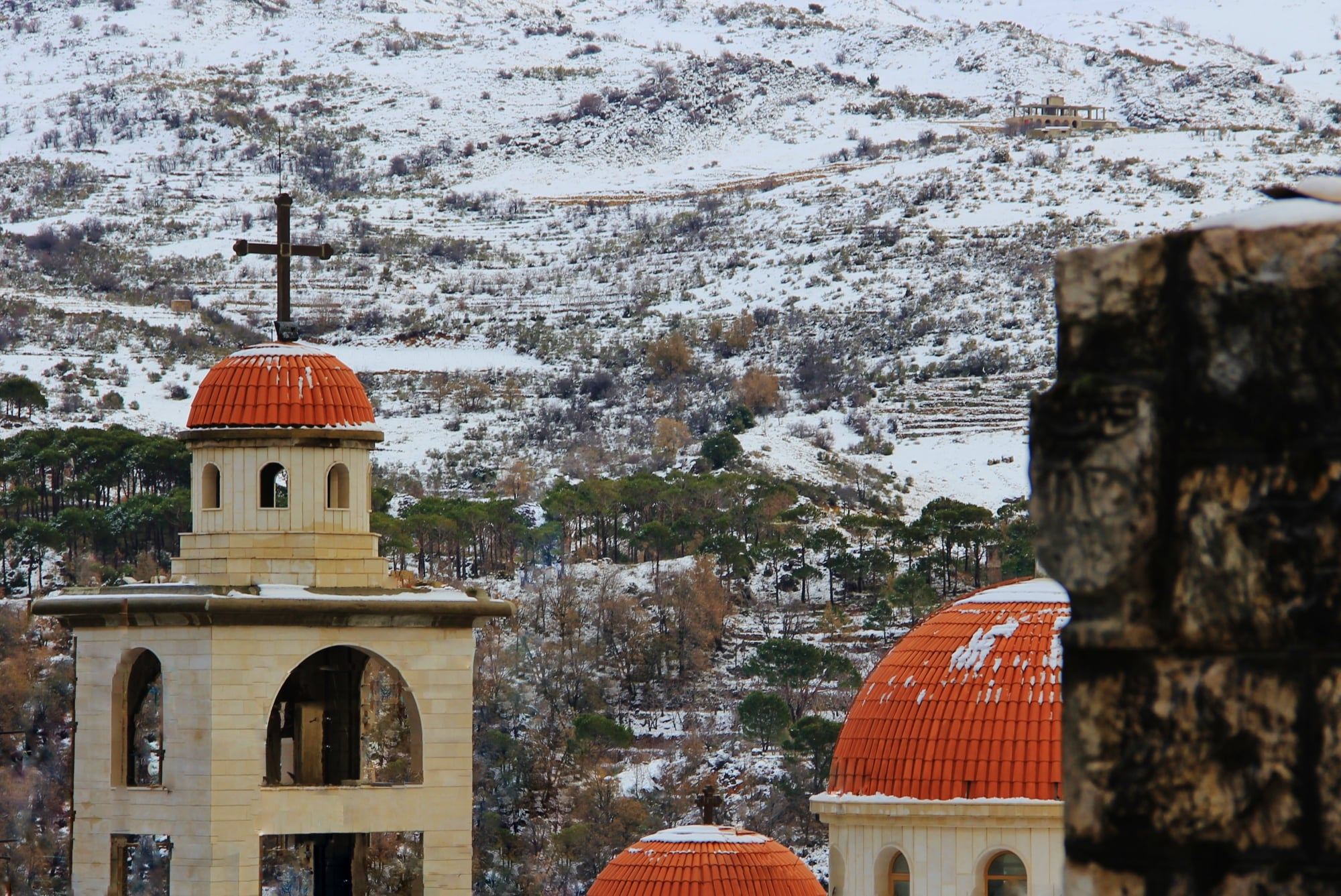
Christian Church and Druze Khalwa in Aley District

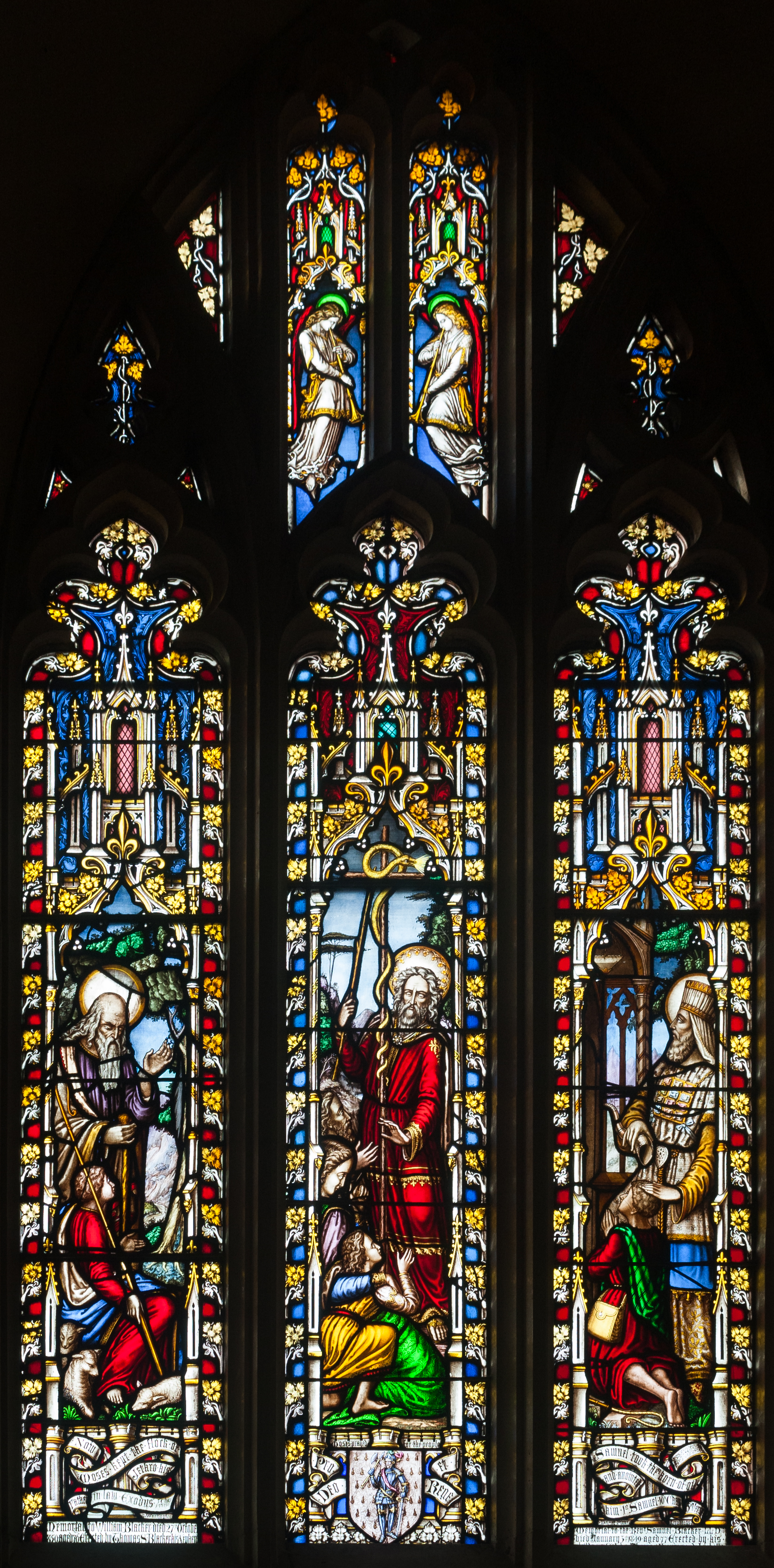
Stained glass window of St Patrick's (COI) Cathedral, depicting Moses and Jethro (left light)

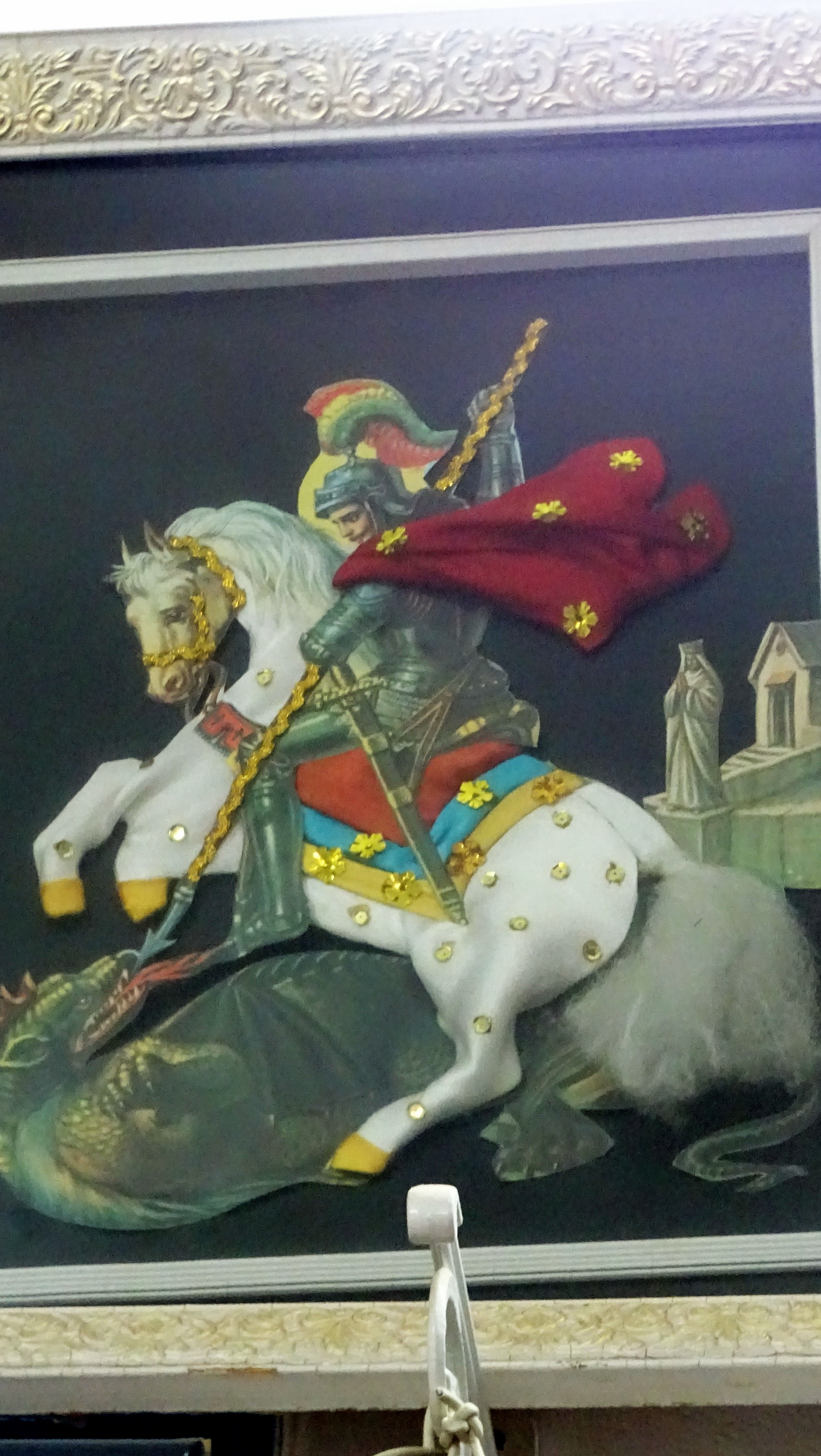
The Icon of Saint George and the Dragon (al-Khidr) is displayed in the Druze Heritage House in Julis.

== See also ==
- Christianity and other religions
- Christianity and Islam

== Sources ==
- Abu Izzedin, Nejla M. (1993) [1984]. The Druzes: A New Study of Their History, Faith, and Society (2nd ed.). Leiden and New York: Brill. ISBN 90-04-09705-8.
- Aytekin, E. Attila (2012). "Peasant Protest in the Late Ottoman Empire: Moral Economy, Revolt, and the Tanzimat Reforms". International Review of Social History. 57 (2): 191–227. doi:10.1017/S0020859012000193. hdl:11511/48429.
- Aalund, Flemming (1992). Vernacular Tradition and the Islamic Architecture of Bosra (PDF) (PhD). Copenhagen: The Royal Academy of Fine Arts School of Architecture.
- Batatu, H. (1999). Syria's Peasantry, the Descendants of Its Lesser Rural Notables, and Their Politics. Princeton University Press. ISBN 0-691-00254-1.
- Betts, Robert Brenton (1988). The Druze. New Haven: Yale University Press. ISBN 0-300-04100-4.
- Burkitt, Francis C. (1925). The Religion of the Manichees: Donnellan Lectures 1924. Cambridge, England: Cambridge University Press. OCLC 79046876.
- Chehab, Hafez (1994). "Reconstructing the Medici Portrait of Fakhr al-Din Maʾani". Muqarnas. 11: 117–124. doi:10.2307/1523213. JSTOR 1523213.
- Cross, Frank L.; Livingstone, E.A., eds. (2005). Oxford Dictionary of the Christian Church. Oxford University Press. ISBN 978-0-19-280290-3. Archived from the original on May 15, 2019.
- Daftary, Farhad (2007). The Ismāʿı̄lı̄s: Their History and Doctrines (Second ed.). Cambridge: Cambridge University Press. ISBN 978-0-521-61636-2.
- Dana, Nissi (2003). The Druze in the Middle East: Their Faith, Leadership, Identity and Status. University of Michigan Press. p. 56. ISBN 978-1-903900-36-9.
- De Smet, Daniel (2017). "Ḥamza b. ʿAlī". In Fleet, Kate; Krämer, Gudrun; Matringe, Denis; Nawas, John; Rowson, Everett (eds.). Encyclopaedia of Islam (3rd ed.). Brill Online. ISSN 1873-9830.
- Emmett, Chad F. (1995). Beyond the basilica: Christians and Muslims in Nazareth. Chicago: University of Chicago Press. ISBN 0-226-20711-0. OCLC 30735259.
- Fawaz, L. T. (1994). An Occasion for War: Civil Conflict in Lebanon and Damascus in 1860. University of California Press. ISBN 978-0-520-08782-8.
- Firro, Kais (1992). A History of the Druzes. Vol. 1. BRILL. ISBN 90-04-09437-7.
- Halm, Heinz (2003). Die Kalifen von Kairo: Die Fāṭimiden in Ägypten, 973–1074 [The Caliphs of Cairo: The Fatimids in Egypt, 973–1074] (in German). Munich: C. H. Beck. ISBN 3-406-48654-1.
- Harris, William (2012). Lebanon: A History, 600-2011. Oxford University Press. ISBN 978-0-19-518111-1.
- Hartal, Moshe (2006). Dar, Shimon; Hartal, Moshe; Ayalon, E. (eds.). Rafid on the Golan: A Profile of a Late Roman and Byzantine Village. British Archaeological Reports International Series 1555. Oxford: Archaeopress. ISBN 1-84171-984-6.(registration required)
- Hazran, Yusri (2014). The Druze Community and the Lebanese State: Between Confrontation and Reconciliation. London and New York: Routledge. ISBN 978-0-415-72549-1.
- Hitti, Philip Khūri (1924). Origins of the Druze People and Religion. Forgotten Books. ISBN 978-1-60506-068-2.
- Heras, Nicholas A. (June 2014). "A Profile of Syria's Strategic Dar'a Province". CTC Sentinel. 7 (6). Combating Terrorism Center: 20–23.
- Hitti, Philip K. (1966). The Origins of the Druze People: With Extracts from Their Sacred Writings. AMS Press.
- Kratschkowsky, I. & Halm, Heinz (1993). "al-Muḳtanā". In Bosworth, C. E.; van Donzel, E.; Heinrichs, W. P. & Pellat, Ch. (eds.). The Encyclopaedia of Islam, Second Edition. Volume VII: Mif–Naz. Leiden: E. J. Brill. p. 544. doi:10.1163/1573-3912_islam_SIM_5483. ISBN 978-90-04-09419-2.
- Van Leeuwen, Richard (1994). Notables and Clergy in Mount Lebanon: The Khāzin Sheikhs and the Maronite Church, 1736–1840. BRILL. ISBN 978-90-04-09978-4.
- Levi Della Vida, G. (2000). "Taym Allah". In Bearman, P. J.; Bianquis, Th.; Bosworth, C. E.; van Donzel, E. & Heinrichs, W. P. (eds.). The Encyclopaedia of Islam, Second Edition. Volume X: T–U. Leiden: E. J. Brill. pp. 400–401. ISBN 978-90-04-11211-7.
- Makarim, Sami Nasib (1974). The Druze Faith. Caravan Books. ISBN 978-0-88206-003-3.
- McGrath, Alister E. (2006). Christianity: An Introduction. John Wiley & Sons. pp. 4–6. ISBN 978-1-4051-0899-7. Archived from the original on September 10, 2015.
- Mishaqa, Mikhail (1988). Thackston, Wheeler McIntosh (ed.). Murder, Mayhem, Pillage, and Plunder: The History of the Lebanon in the 18th and 19th Centuries by Mikhayil Mishaqa (1800-1873). State University of New York Press. ISBN 978-0-88706-712-9.
- Morgenstern, Julian (1966). The Rites of Birth, Marriage, Death, and Kindred Occasions Among the Semites. Hebrew Union College Press.
- Olsaretti, Alessandro (December 2008). "Political Dynamics in the Rise of Fakhr al-Din, 1590-1633". The International History Review. 30 (4): 709–740. doi:10.1080/07075332.2008.10416646. ISSN 1949-6540. JSTOR 40213728. S2CID 153677447.
- Panzac, Daniel (1995). Histoire économique et sociale de l'Empire ottoman et de la Turquie (1326-1960). Peeters Publishers. ISBN 90-6831-799-7.
- Pappé, Ilan (2006). The Ethnic Cleansing of Palestine. Oneworld. ISBN 978-1-85168-555-4.
- Reilly, James A. (2016). The Ottoman Cities of Lebanon: Historical Legacy and Identity in the Modern Middle East. London: I. B. Tauris. ISBN 978-1-78672-036-8.
- Salibi, Kamal S. (January 1961). "The Buḥturids of the Garb. Mediaeval Lords of Beirut and of Southern Lebanon". Arabica. 8 (1): 74–97. doi:10.1163/157005861X00043. JSTOR 4054971.
- Salibi, K. (1965). "Fakhr al-Dīn". In Lewis, B.; Pellat, Ch. & Schacht, J. (eds.). The Encyclopaedia of Islam, Second Edition. Volume II: C–G. Leiden: E. J. Brill. pp. 749–751. OCLC 495469475.
- Salibi, K. (February 1968). "The muqaddams of Bšarrī: Maronite chieftains of the Northern Lebanon 1382–1621". Arabica. 15 (1): 63–86. doi:10.1163/157005868X00280. ISSN 0570-5398. JSTOR 4056124.
- Salibi, K. (2005). A House of Many Mansions: The History of Lebanon Reconsidered. London: I.B. Tauris. ISBN 978-1-86064-912-7.
- Salibi, Kamal Suleiman (2005b). The Druze: Realities & Perceptions. University of Michigan Press. ISBN 978-1-904850-06-9.
- Schilcher, L. Schatkowski (1981). "The Hauran Conflicts of the 1860s: A Chapter in the Rural History of Modern Syria". International Journal of Middle East Studies. 13 (2): 159–179. doi:10.1017/S0020743800055276. JSTOR 162818. S2CID 162263141. (registration required)
- Shahid, I. (2000). "Tanūkh". In Bearman, P. J.; Bianquis, Th.; Bosworth, C. E.; van Donzel, E. & Heinrichs, W. P. (eds.). The Encyclopaedia of Islam, Second Edition. Volume X: T–U. Leiden: E. J. Brill. pp. 190–192. ISBN 978-90-04-11211-7.
- Sourdel, D. (1971). "Ḥawrān". In Lewis, B.; Ménage, V.L.; Pellat, Ch.; Schacht, J. (eds.). The Encyclopaedia of Islam, New Edition. Vol. III: H–Iram. Leiden: E.J. Brill. pp. 292–293. ISBN 90-04-08118-6.
- Stone, Christopher (2008). Popular Culture and Nationalism in Lebanon: The Fairouz and Rahbani Nation. Abingdon, Oxon and New York: Routledge. ISBN 978-0-415-77273-0.
