= Risalat al-Ghayba =

Risālat al-Ghayba (Arabic: رسالة الغيبة, 'Epistle of Occultation') may refer to:

- Risālat al-Ghayba, a work written in 1021 by the Druze leader Hamza ibn Ali after the disappearance of the Fatimid Imam-caliph al-Hakim bi-Amr Allah (985–1021), announcing al-Hakim's concealment or occultation (ghayba)
- Risālat al-Ghayba, a work written in 1042 by Hamza ibn Ali's pupil Baha al-Din al-Muqtana, announcing the suspension of Druze missionary activity due to the imminence of the end times

== See also ==
- Ghayba (disambiguation), the Shi'ite concept of the concealment or occultation of an Imam
- Kitab al-Ghayba (disambiguation), the name of two Twelver Shi'ite works on the occultation of the twelfth Imam Muhammad al-Mahdi (c. 868–874)
