= Khalwat al-Bayada =

Sanctuary of the Druze in Lebanon

Coordinates: 33°23′11.33″N 35°40′45.47″E

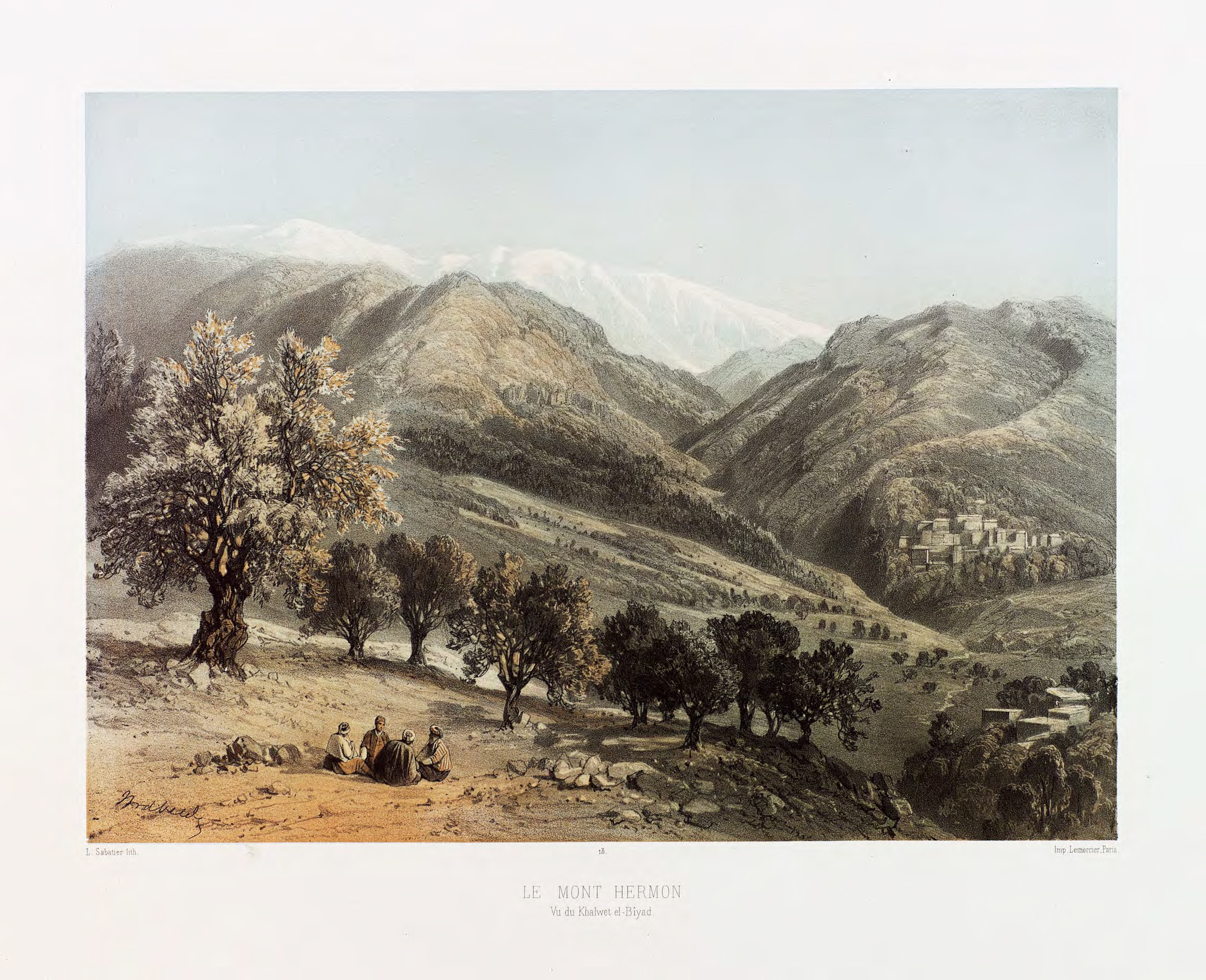
Khalwat al-Bayada, in the early 1850s, by van de Velde

The Khalwat al-Bayada (خلوات البياضة, 'White Khalwat'; also romanized Khalwet el Biyad, Khalwat al-Biyyada) is the central sanctuary, and theological school of the Druze, located in Lebanon and founded in the 19th century by Sheikh Hamad el-Qais. Located near Hasbaya, the khalwat is the location where Ad-Darazi is supposed to have settled and taught from during the first Druze call.

It features a large, circular, stone bench next to an ancient oak tree known as Areopagus of the Elders that is secluded amongst nature and trees. The Kalwaat provides around forty hermitages for Al-ʻuqqāl (the initiated) at various times of the year. In 1838, copies of the Epistles of Wisdom were taken from the site by invading Egyptians.

== See also ==
- Cemevi
- Jama'at Khana
- Majlis
