= Apamea, Syria =

Ancient city in Al-Suqaylabiyah, Syria

Apamea
- Ἀπάμεια (Ancient Greek); أفامية (Arabic)
- Afāmiyah; Fāmiya; Cherronêsos; Pella; Kalat el-Mudik
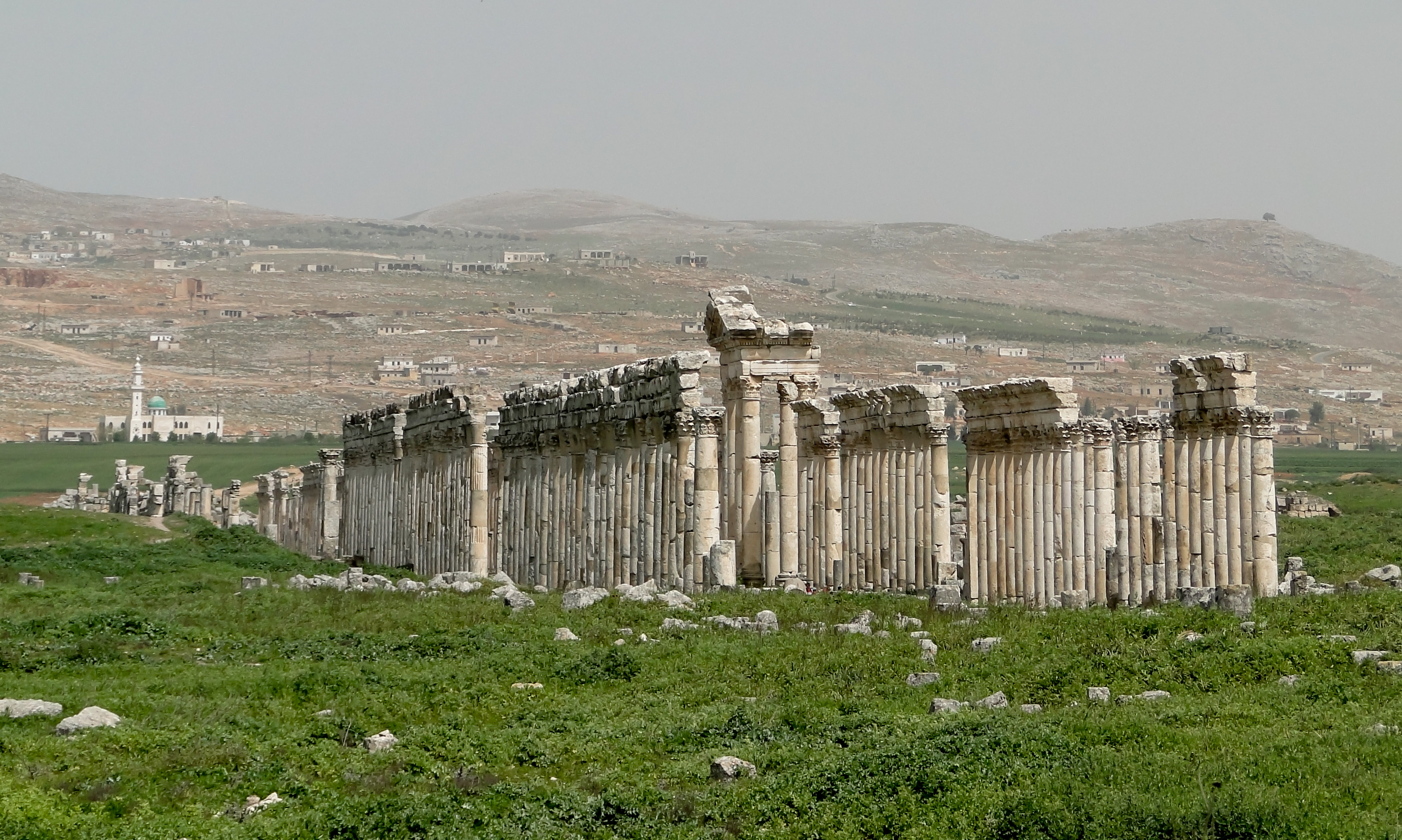
- Colonnade of Apamea

- Location within Syria
- Interactive map of Apamea
- 35°25′05″N 36°23′53″E
- Type: Settlement
- Etymology: Named after Apama, wife of Seleucus I Nicator
- Cultures: Hellenistic, Roman, Medieval Greek, Levantine
- Satellite of: Seleucid Empire; Roman Republic/Roman Empire
- Location: Hama Governorate, Syria
- Region: Ghab Plain
- Nearest city: Hama, Syria

History
- Founded: c. 300 BC
- Founder: Seleucus I Nicator
- Original use: Military settlement/city
- Abandoned: 13th century
- Rebuilt: Rebuilt after the 115 AD earthquake; restored under Justinian I

Site notes
- Architectural styles: Hellenistic, Roman, Byzantine
- Archaeologists: Jean Lassus
- Condition: Ruins
- Owner: Public
- Public access: Yes

Apamea (Greek: Ἀπάμεια, Apameia; Arabic: أفامية, romanized: afāmiyah) is an ancient Hellenistic and Roman city situated on the right bank of the Orontes River, in the northwest of modern Syria. Founded under the name Pella as a Macedonian military settlement following the Wars of the Diadochi, it was established as a fortified city around 300 BC by Seleucus I Nicator, who renamed it after his wife, Apama. The city served as the capital of Apamene under the Seleucids and later became capital of the Roman province of Syria Secunda, a status it retained into the Crusader period.

Apamea came under Roman control in 64 BC when Pompey razed its fortress, and it later withstood a three-year siege during the revolt of Quintus Caecilius Bassus. The city suffered destruction in the Antioch earthquake of 115 AD but was soon rebuilt, with major reconstruction continuing through the second century. It was destroyed again by Khosrow I in the sixth century and fell to Sasanian forces during the Byzantine–Sasanian War before being retaken. Following the Muslim conquest of Syria, Apamea was partially resettled and regained prominence under the Hamdanid dynasty; it later passed to Crusader control under Tancred before being destroyed by an earthquake in 1152.

The city's main remains include the Great Colonnade, an approximately 2 km (1.2 mi) avenue lined with columns that constituted one of the longest such structures in the Roman world, and the Roman Theatre, among the largest surviving theatres of the Roman Empire with an estimated seating capacity exceeding 20,000. The colonnade, rebuilt after the 115 AD earthquake and later modified under the Byzantine emperor Justinian I, formed the city's cardo maximus and connected baths, an agora, and a nymphaeum. Additional features include a late antique synagogue with an inscribed mosaic floor, later succeeded by a Christian church on the same site, and the Great Hunting Mosaic, a large early 5th-century floor mosaic recovered from a building believed to have been the residence of the provincial governor.

Numerous artifacts from Apamea, including a reconstructed section of the Great Colonnade and the Great Hunting Mosaic, are held at the Art & History Museum in Brussels. Following the onset of the Syrian civil war, the site has sustained damage from looting.

== Geography ==
The site lies on the edge of the modern town of Qalaat al-Madiq, about 55 km (34 mi) to the northwest of Hama, Syria, overlooking the Ghab valley.

== History ==
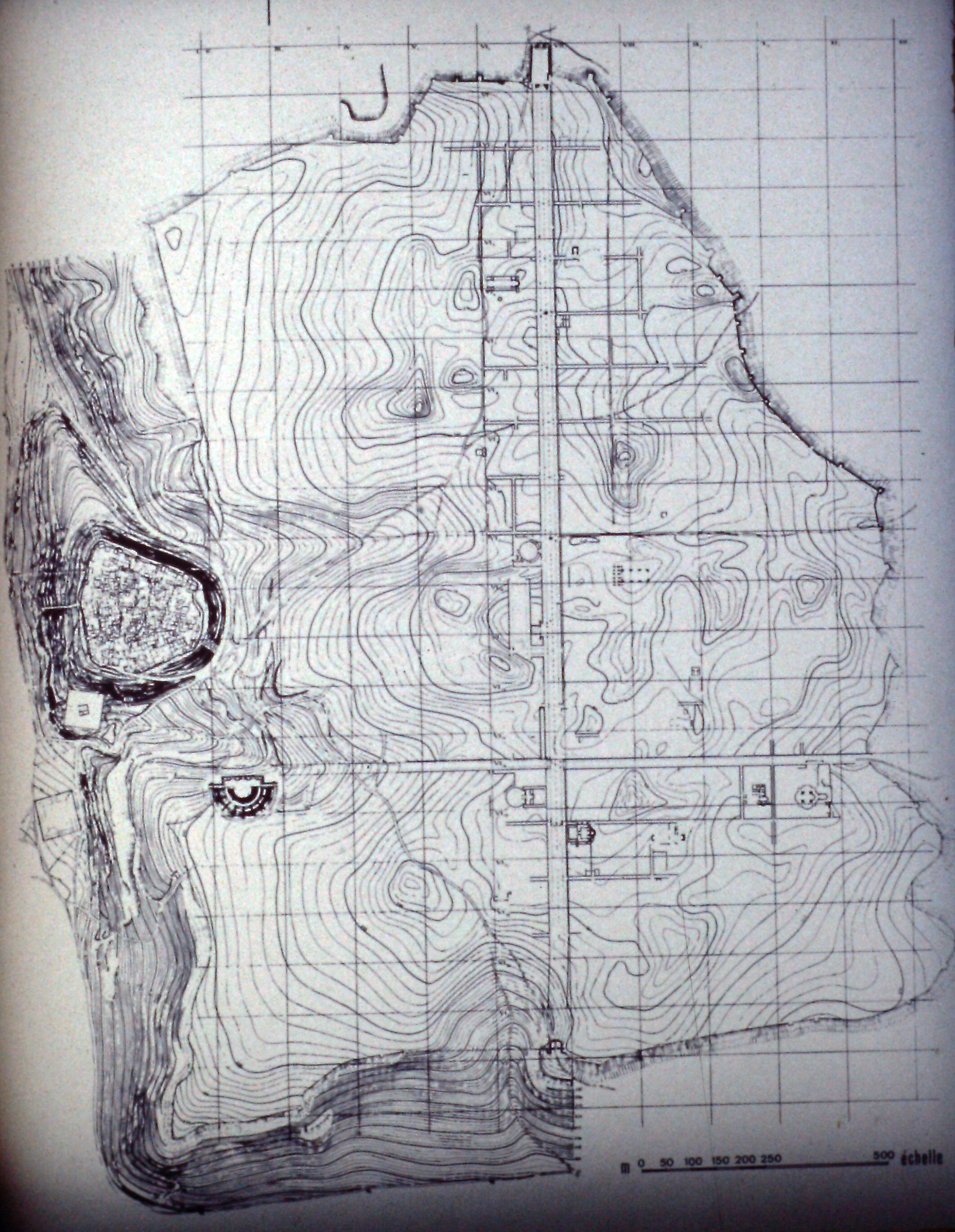
Contoured map of Apamea

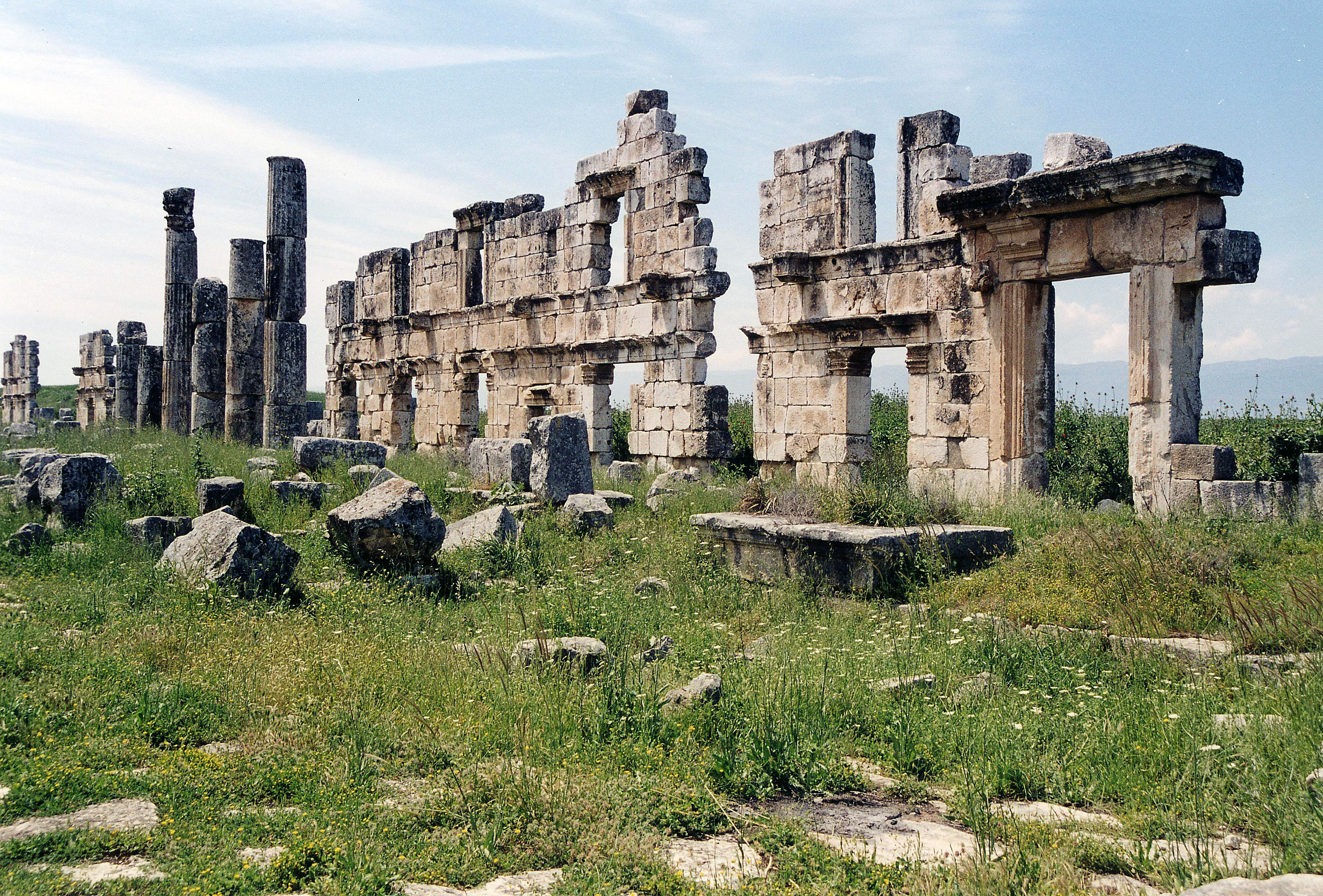
Houses and shops along the Colonnade street, Apamea in 2002

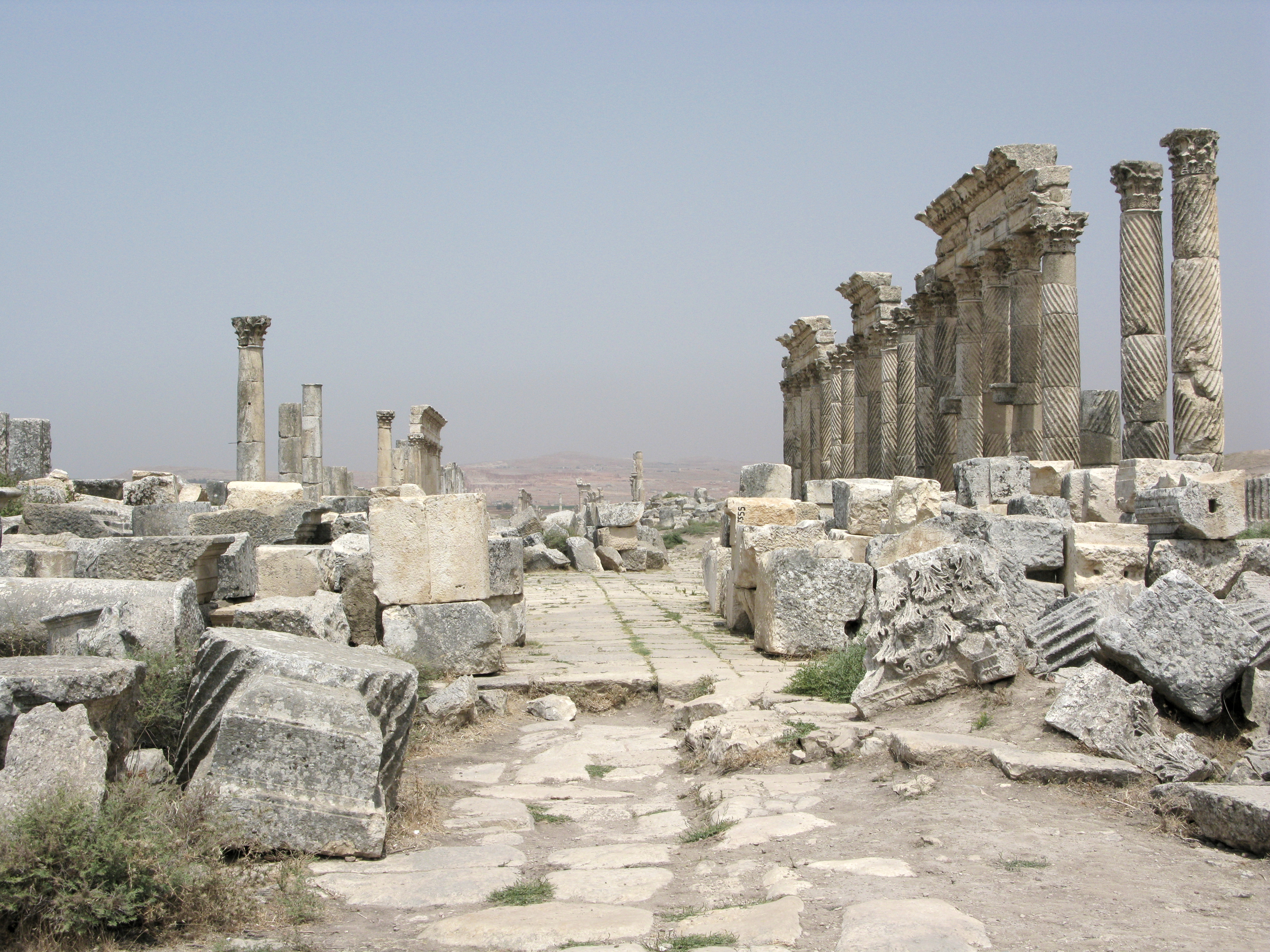
Colonnade street, detail, Apamea

=== Hellenistic era ===
After the conquest of the region by Alexander the Great and the subsequent wars between his generals, and according to the new interpretation of a new historical and iconographic source for Hellenistic history, a mosaic of Apamea discovered in 2011, proposed by Olszewski and Saad, the foundation of Pella, the Macedonian military camp (katoikia) took place in the fall 320 BC, just after the Treaty of Triparadeisos (320 BC) at the initiative of Antipater, and Cassander's inspiration. In view of this interpretation, the authors disagree with the earlier hypothesises attributing the foundation of Pella to Alexander the Great or to Antigonus I Monophthalmus. From about 300 BC Pella receive a new status of polis, was fortified and established as a city (polis) by Seleucus I Nicator who named it after his Bactrian wife, Apama, daughter of the Sogdian warlord Spitamenes. The site was enclosed in a loop of the Orontes which, with the lake and marshes, gave it a peninsular form whence its other name of Cherronêsos. It was located at a strategic crossroads for Eastern commerce and became one of the four cities of the Syrian tetrapolis. Seleucus also made it a military base with 500 elephants, and an equestrian stud with 30,000 mares and 300 stallions.

After 142 BC, the pretender Diodotus Tryphon made Apamea the base of his operations.

Q. Aemilius Secundus did a population survey of the city and its territory which belonged to it in AD 6, in which he counted "117,000 hom(ines) civ(ium)" – 117,000 citizen human beings, a figure that has been interpreted as giving a total population of either 130,000 or 500,000, depending on methods used.

=== Early Roman period ===
In 64 BC, Pompey marched south from his winter quarters probably at or near Antioch and razed the fortress of Apamea when the city was annexed to the Roman Republic. In the revolt of Syria under Quintus Caecilius Bassus, it held out against Julius Caesar for three years till the arrival of Cassius in 46 BC. On the outbreak of the Jewish War, the inhabitants of Apamea spared the Jews who lived in their midst and would not suffer them to be murdered or led into captivity. Apamea was briefly captured in 40 BC by the Pompeian-Parthian forces.

Much of Apamea was destroyed in the 115 AD earthquake, but was subsequently rebuilt.

=== Late Roman and Byzantine eras ===
From 218 until 234 AD, the legion II Parthica was stationed in Apamea, when it abandoned support of the usurper Macrinus to the emperor and sided with Elagabalus' rise to the purple who then defeated Macrinus in the Battle of Antioch.

The Targum of Pseudo-Jonathan (Num. xxxiv. 11) has Apamea (אפמיאה) for the city name Shepham as occurring in the Targumim Jerusalem and Neofiti. Since Apamea virtually belonged to Rabbinic Palestine, the first-fruits brought by Ariston from that town were accepted for sacrifice in Jerusalem.

In the early 5th century, Apamea was granted the status of provincial capital of Syria Secunda after its separation from Syria Prima.

The city was destroyed by Khosrow I in the 6th century. During the Byzantine–Sasanian War of 602–628, the city fell in 613 to Shahrbaraz and was in Sasanian hands until near the end of the war.

=== Islamic era ===
Following the Muslim conquest of Syria, Apamea was partially rebuilt and known in Arabic as Afāmiya or Fāmiya. The city was conquered by the Rashidun along with Al-Suqaylabiyah city after the battle of the Yarmuk. Apamea was then used as an observation post to warn against enemy attack.

It was settled by the Arab tribes of Bahra and Udhra. However, it only regained its importance under the rule of Aleppo-based Hamdanid dynasty. Ruled by Khalaf ibn Mula'ib from 1095–1106, the city was taken by Tancred after Khalaf's murder by Assassins. It was destroyed by an earthquake in 1152.

== Remains ==
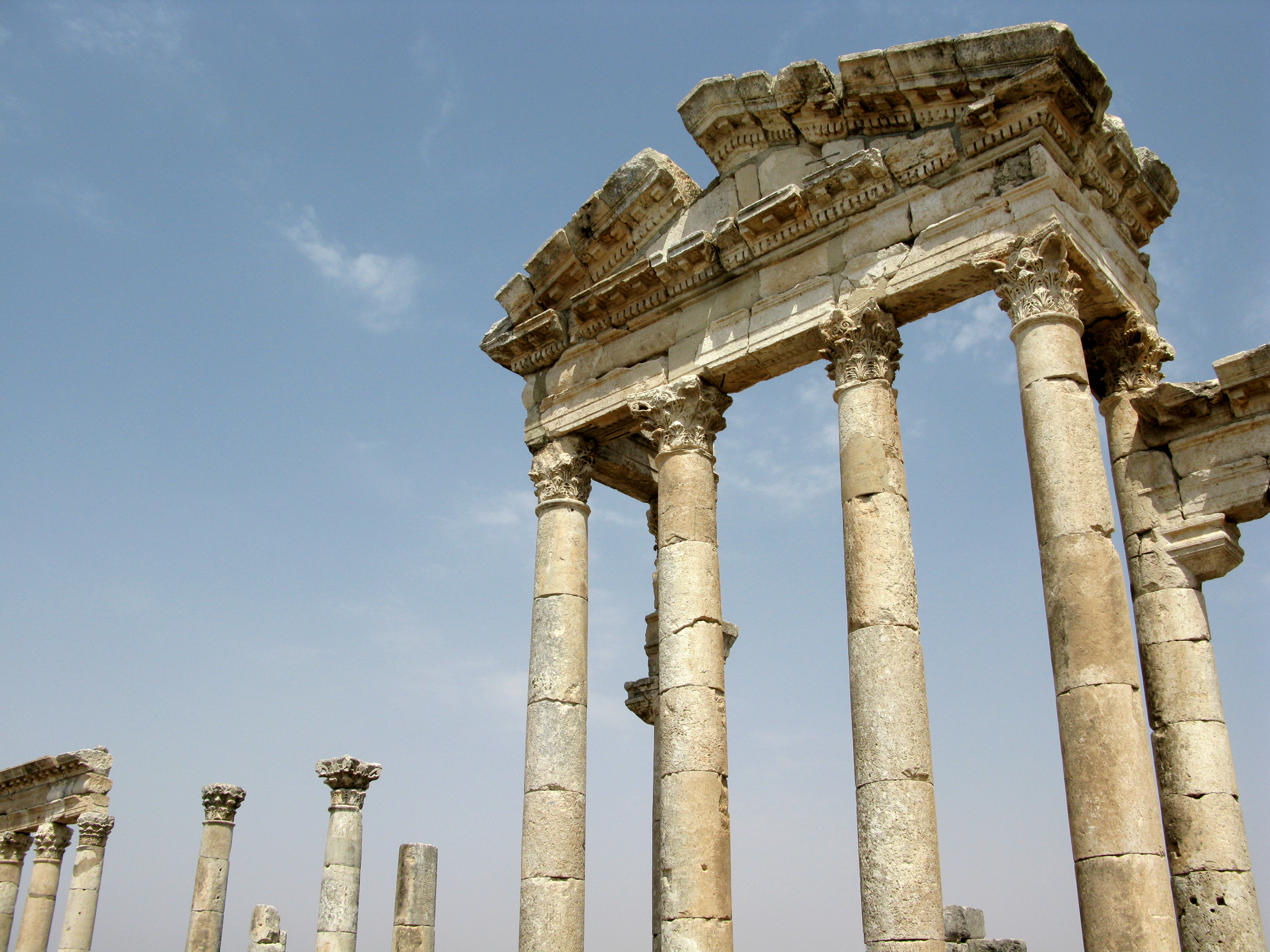
Facade (portico).

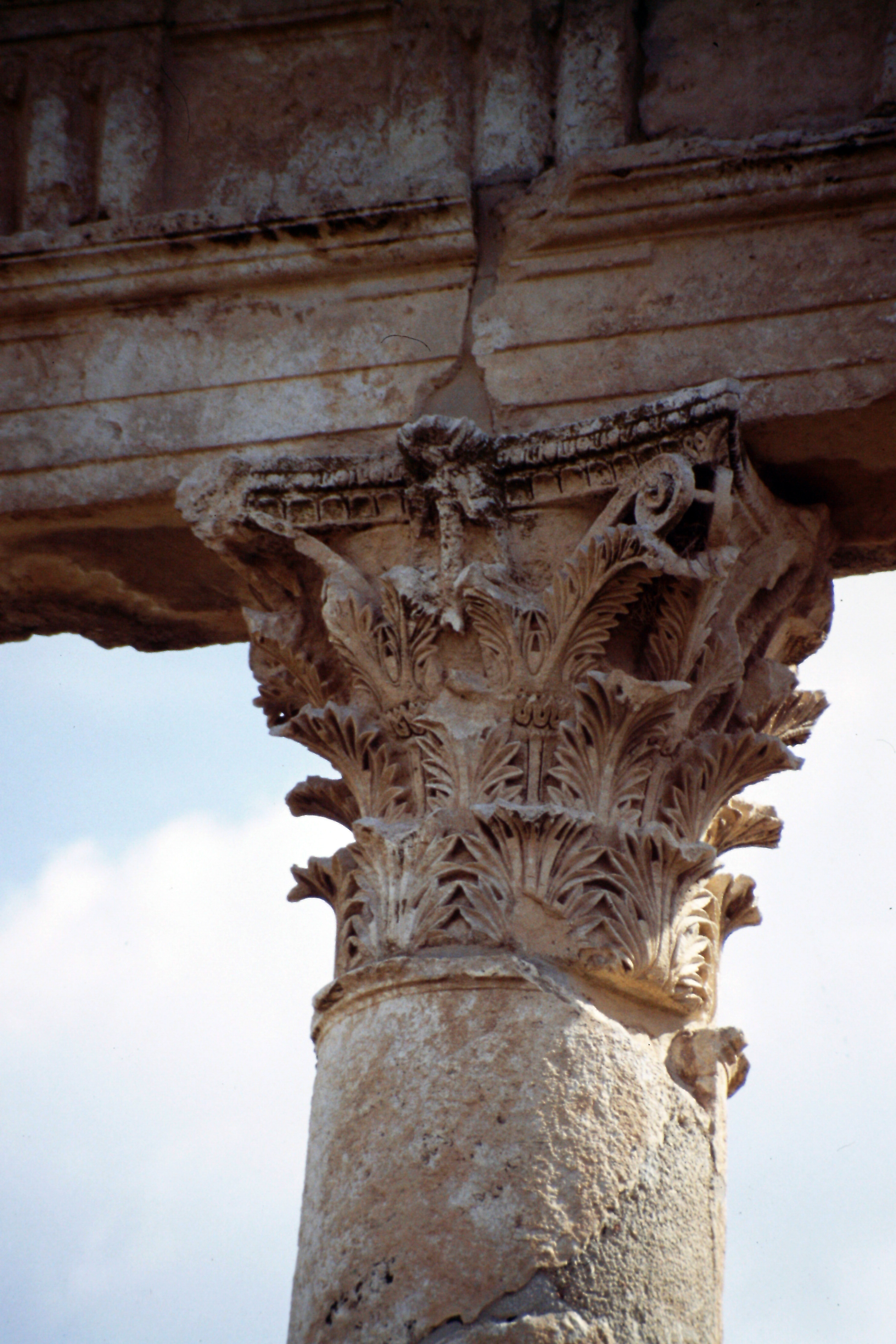
An example of the ornamental ruins.

Many remains of the ancient acropolis are still standing, consisting probably of the remains of highly decorated temples of which Sozomen speaks; it is now enclosed in ancient castle walls called Kalat el-Mudik (Kŭlat el-Mudîk); the remainder of the ancient city is to be found in the plain.

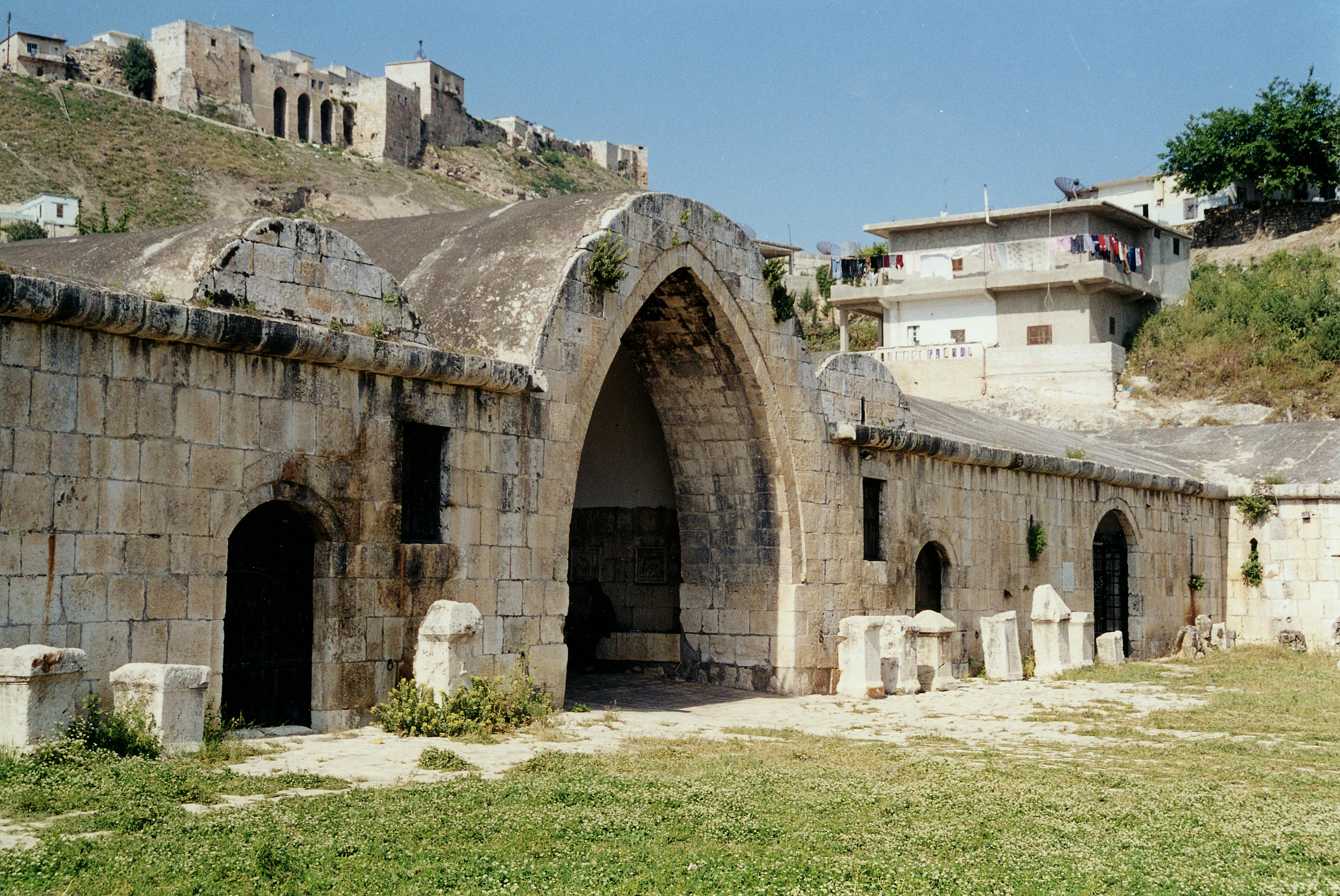
Museum, view of the courtyard, Apamea in 2002

The most significant collection of objects from the site, including many significant architectural and artistic objects, that can be seen outside of Syria are in Brussels at the Cinquantenaire Museum.

As a result of the civil war in Syria, the ancient city has been damaged and looted by treasure hunters. In April 2017, Al-Masdar News published satellite photographs revealing the site was covered in hundreds of holes dug by treasure hunters seeking ancient artifacts.

=== Great Colonnade ===
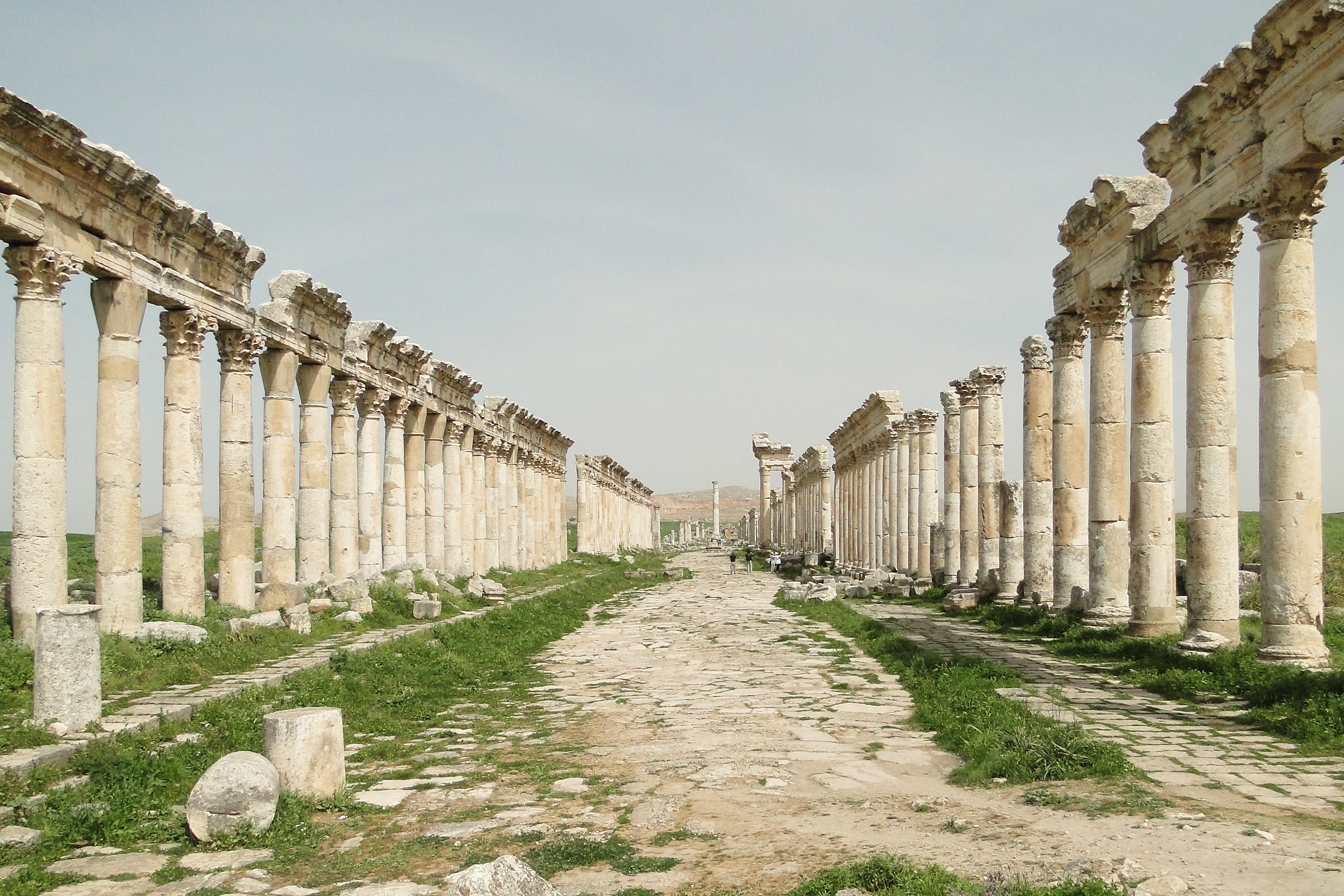
The Great Colonnade at Apamea

The Great Colonnade was situated along the main avenue of Apamea and ran for nearly 2 kilometres (1.2 mi), making it among the longest in the Roman world. It was rebuilt after the original, dating from the Seleucid Empire, was devastated along with the rest of Apamea in the 115 AD earthquake. Reconstruction started immediately and over the course of the second century the city was completely rebuilt, starting with the Great Colonnade. The colonnade was aligned along the north-south axis, making up the city's "cardo maximus". Starting at the city's north gate, the colonnade ran in an uninterrupted straight line to the south gate. The northern third of the colonnade's stretch is marked by a monumental votive column that stood opposite the baths. The colonnade passed through the centre of the city and several important buildings were clustered around it, including the baths, the agora, the Temple of Tyche, the nymphaeum, the rotunda, the atrium church and the basilica. On either side of the street a 6.15 metres (20.2 ft)-wide colonnade ran its full length. The columns were 9 metres (30 ft) high and 0.9 metres (2 ft 11 in) in diameter. They stood on square bases of 1.24 m on a side and 0.47 m high. The columns display two main designs: plain and distinctive spiral flutes. Archaeologist Jean Lassus argues that the former dates back to the Trajanic period, and the latter to that of Antoninus Pius. The colonnade's porticoes were paved with extensive mosaics along the full stretch of the colonnade.

Under the Byzantine Emperor Justinian I, several parts of the colonnade were restored. The street was narrowed to 12 m by adding a walkway on either side. Several stretches of the street had their Roman pavement replaced with a new pavement made of squared blocks of limestone. The new pavement also covered a completely overhauled drainage system. Justinian's changes included erecting a monumental tetrastylon made up of four 9 m high columns with a metre-high capitals. The city, was however, later sacked by the Sasanians under Adarmahan.

A reconstructed section of the colonnade can be seen in the Brussels Art & History Museum.

=== Roman theatre ===
Originally built as a Hellenistic style theatre in the early Seleucid Empire, the theatre was expanded and remodelled in the early Roman period, when the main stage and entrances were reorganized in a more typical Roman fashion. The 115 Antioch earthquake caused severe damage to the structure. It was rebuilt soon afterwards, under the patronage of both Trajan and Hadrian. The theatre was further expanded in the first half of the third century CE. Under the Byzantine Empire the theatre's drainage basin was restructured and a qanat was built through the middle of the lower stage. By the late Byzantine period the theatre had stopped serving as a centre for theatrical performances. However, the theatre and its qanat continued to be an important water source during the Byzantine and Islamic periods. The theatre was built into a steep hill overlooking the Orontes River valley.

The theatre, along with the one at Ephesus, is one of the largest surviving theatres of the Roman Empire with an estimated seating capacity in excess of 20,000. The only other known theatre that is considerably larger was the Theatre of Pompey in Rome. Much of its structure is in ruins due to architectural collapses and extensive quarrying in later epochs, and only one-eighth of the site has been exposed so far. One of the main features at the theatre is its water basin and the elaborate Roman piping system used in it. The recently excavated terracotta system is located along the eastern ground entrance and is well preserved.

=== Great hunting mosaic ===
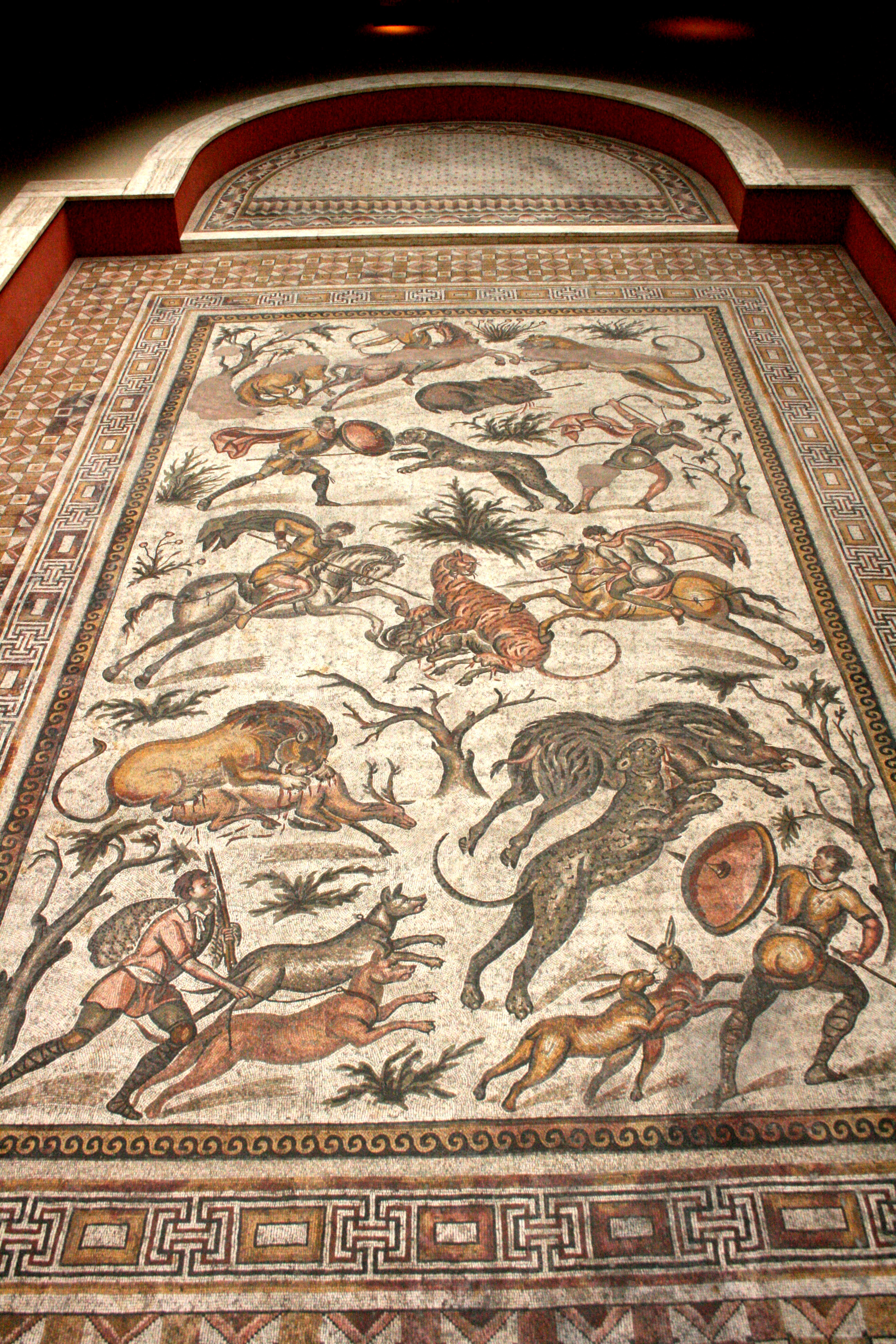
Great Hunting Mosaic from the Governor's residence, 414–420 AD

This mosaic, now in the Cinquantenaire Museum, Brussels, was discovered in 1935 in the reception room of what was probably the palace of the Roman governor of the province of Syria Secunda. Its area is 120 m^{2}.

The great mosaic dates from 415–420 AD and is amongst the most prestigious of this type of composition. It is comparable technically and thematically with mosaics in the Palace of the Byzantine emperors in Constantinople, of the same period.

An inscription at the entrance states: "During the most beautiful Apellion, the triclinium was rebuilt in the month Gorpiaios, third indict, in the year 851" (September, 539 AD).

=== Synagogue ===
Near the city's center, a 4th-century Jewish synagogue was discovered. It features a geometric mosaic floor, dating from around 391 CE. The mosaic includes 19 inscriptions recording the names of the donors, as well as their offices, including 'archisynagogos' and 'hazzan' or 'diakonos.' In the 5th century, a Christian church was built on the site of the synagogue.

== Bishopric ==
Christianity came to the area within the first century. Bishops included:

- Marcellus of Apamea (fl. 375)
- Alexander of Apamea (fl. 431)
- Alpheius of Apamea Asistente al consilio de Neocesarea
- Julian of Apamea, saint and opponent of Montanism (S. III)
- Domnus (fl. 451)
- Epiphanius (451/457–after 471)
- Isaac (ordained bef. 512, died c. 513/514)
- Stephen (in 512–516)
- Cosmas (in 512–516)
- Peter of Apamea, monophysite (515/516–518/519)

Today a number of Christian denominations maintain titular sees for the town. These include

- Latin Catholic titular Metropolitan archbishopric
- Melkite Catholic titular Metropolitan archbishopric
- Syriac Catholic Catholic titular Metropolitan archbishopric
- Maronite Catholic titular bishopric

== People ==
- Al-Muqtana – (11th-century Ismāʿīlī Governor and a founder of the Druze Faith, the primary exponent of the Divine call and author of several of the Epistles of Wisdom)
- Marinus – (praetorian prefect)
- Archigenes – (physician)
- Diodotus Tryphon – (official under King Alexander I Balas)
- Aristarchus of Thessalonica – (bishop, one of the Seventy Apostles)
- Evagrius Scholasticus – (6th-century historian)
- Iamblichus of Chalcis – (Neo-Platonist philosopher)
- Sopater of Apamea – (sophist and Neoplatonist philosopher)
- Alexander of Apamea – 5th-century bishop
- Alcibiades of Apamea
- Junias – (1st-century bishop)
- Numenius of Apamea – (2nd century philosopher)
- Polychronius – (bishop, and brother of Theodore of Mopsuestia)
- Posidonius – (Greek philosopher and author, 2nd–1st Century BCE)
- Eunus – rebel slave and self proclaimed King of Enna, led the First Servile War against the Roman Republic
- Pseudo-Oppian poet
- Sextus Varius Marcellus – (3rd-century Roman Equestrian and later governor of Numidia. Husband of Julia Soaemias and father of Roman emperor Elagabalus)
- Theodoret – (5th-century bishop)

== See also ==
- Qalaat al-Madiq (modern city)
- Apamea (Babylonia)
- List of ancient Greek cities
- John of Apamea, 5th-century Syriac Christian writer

== Bibliography ==
- Marek Titien Olszewski, Houmam Saad, "Pella-Apamée sur l'Oronte et ses héros fondateurs à la lumière d’une source historique inconnue: une mosaïque d’Apamée", in: M. P. Castiglioni, R. Carboni, M. Giuman, H. Bernier-Farella (eds.), Héros fondateurs et identités communautaires dans l’Antiquité, entre mythe, rite et politique, Morlacchi University Press, Padoue, pp. 365–416 (ISBN 978-88-9392-053-7)
- William Smith (editor); Dictionary of Greek and Roman Geography, "Apameia", London, (1854)
- R. F. Burton and T. Drake, Unexplored Syria
- E. Sachau, Reise in Syrien, 1883.
