= Kitab al-Ghayba =

Kitāb al-Ghayba (Arabic: كتاب الغيبة, 'the Book of Occultation') may refer to:

- Kitab al-Ghayba (al-Nu'mani), a work by the Twelver Shi'ite scholar Muhammad ibn Ibrahim al-Nu'mani (died c. 970) on the occultation of the twelfth Imam Muhammad al-Mahdi (c. 868–874)
- Kitab al-Ghayba (al-Tusi), a work by the Twelver Shi'ite scholar Shaykh Tusi (995–1067) on the occultation of the twelfth Imam Muhammad al-Mahdi

== See also ==
- Ghayba, the Shi'ite concept of the concealment or occultation of an Imam
- Risālat al-Ghayba, a work written in 1021 by the Druze leader Hamza ibn Ali after the disappearance of the Fatimid Imam-caliph al-Hakim bi-Amr Allah (985–1021), announcing al-Hakim's occultation
- Risālat al-Ghayba, a work written in 1042 by Hamza ibn Ali's pupil Baha al-Din al-Muqtana, announcing the suspension of Druze missionary activity due to the imminence of the end times
