= Divine call =

The divine call, unitarian call, or da‘wat at-tawḥīd is the time period of Druze proselytization that was opened at sunset on Thursday 30 May 1017 CE by Fātimid Caliph al-Hakim bi-Amr Allah and closed in 1043 CE by al-Muqtana Baha'uddin, henceforth prohibiting anyone else from converting to the Druze religion.

== History ==
The call was suspended briefly between 19 May 1018 and 9 May 1019 CE during the apostasy of ad-Darazi and again between 1021 and 1026 CE during a period of persecution by Ali az-Zahir for those who had sworn the oath to accept the call. Persecutions started forty days after the disappearance into occultation of al-Hakim, who was thought to have been converting people to a Unitarian faith for over twenty years prior. Al-Hakim convinced some heretical followers such as ad-Darazi of his soteriological divinity and officially declared the Divine call after issuing a decree promoting religious freedom.

Remove ye the causes of fear and estrangement from yourselves. Do away with the corruption of delusion and conformity. Be ye certain that the Prince of Believers hath given unto you free will, and hath spared you the trouble of disguising and concealing your true beliefs, so that when ye work ye may keep your deeds pure for God. He hath done thus so that when you relinquish your previous beliefs and doctrines ye shall not indeed lean on such causes of impediments and pretensions. By conveying to you the reality of his intention, the Prince of Believers hath spared you any excuse for doing so. He hath urged you to declare your belief openly. Ye are now safe from any hand which may bring harm unto you. Ye now may find rest in his assurance ye shall not be wronged. Let those who are present convey this message unto the absent so that it may be known by both the distinguished and the common people. It shall thus become a rule to mankind; and Divine Wisdom shall prevail for all the days to come.

The call summoned people to a true unitarian belief that removed all attributes (wise, just, outside, inside, etc.) from God. It promoted absolute monotheism and the concepts of supporting your fellow man, true speech and pursuit of oneness with God. These concepts superseded all ritual, law and dogma and requirements for pilgrimage, fasting, holy days, prayer, charity, devotion, profession of faith and particular worship of any prophet or person was downplayed. Islamic law was opposed and Druze traditions started during the call continue today, such as meeting for reading, prayer and social gathering on a Thursday instead of a Friday at Khalwats instead of mosques. Such gatherings and traditions were not compulsory and people were encouraged to pursue a state of compliance with the real law of nature governing the universe. Epistle thirteen of the Epistles of Wisdom called it "A spiritual doctrine without any ritualistic imposition". The time of the call was seen as a revolution of truth, with missionaries preaching its message all around the Middle East. These messengers were sent out with the Druze epistles and took written vows from believers, whose souls are thought to still exist in the Druze of today. The souls of those who took the vows during the call are believed to be continuously reincarnating in successive generations of Druze until the return of al-Hakim to proclaim a second Divine call and establish a golden age of justice and peace for all.

In 1043 al-Muqtana declared that the sect would no longer accept new pledges, and since that time proselytization has been prohibited awaiting al-Hakim's return on Judgement day to usher in a new golden age.

== See also ==
- Hamza ibn-'Ali ibn-Ahmad
- ad-Darazi
- Baha’ud-Dīn as-Samuqī
