= Ariston of Apamea =

Second Temple-period Syrian Jew

Ariston of Apamea (fl. 1st century AD) is the name of a Jew from the Second Temple period from the city of Apamea in Northwestern Syria, on the bank of the Orontes River. He is a figure that is linked to mentions in the Mishnah and the Talmud.

== Archaeological record ==
Archaeological excavations at the historical site in Akeldama in 1989 showed a cave numbered "3" to bear inscriptions which identify it as the Ariston family cave. It lists the presumed patriarch as Ariston of Apamea, who made a pilgrimage to Jerusalem from the city of Apamea with his family. He is known to have had two daughters: Selampsin and Shalom.

Josephus notes the existence of a Jewish community in the city of Apamea during the period in which Ariston would have lived.

== Record in the Mishnah ==
In tractate Challah of the Talmud, it is stated:

Ariston brought his first fruits from Apamea and they accepted from him, because they said, one who buys [a field] in Syria is as one who buys [a field] in the outskirts of Jerusalem.

This Ariston, due to his important position enough to bring his offerings to the Temple and be recorded, paired with his clear prominence in the archaeological record, has caused some scholars to connect the two as the same figure. This connection is noted as remarkable by some academics, as the number of Roman-era Biblical figures identified through ossuaries is fairly small compared to other kinds of artifacts. Additionally, the fact that first fruit offerings from as far north as Syria were accepted have created questions in the Mishnah regarding the boundaries of what would have been considered Israel by the contemporary residents and government.
