= Sack of Apamea =

Battle during the Byzantine–Sasanian War of 572–591

Battle of Apamea
- Part of Byzantine–Sasanian War of 572–591
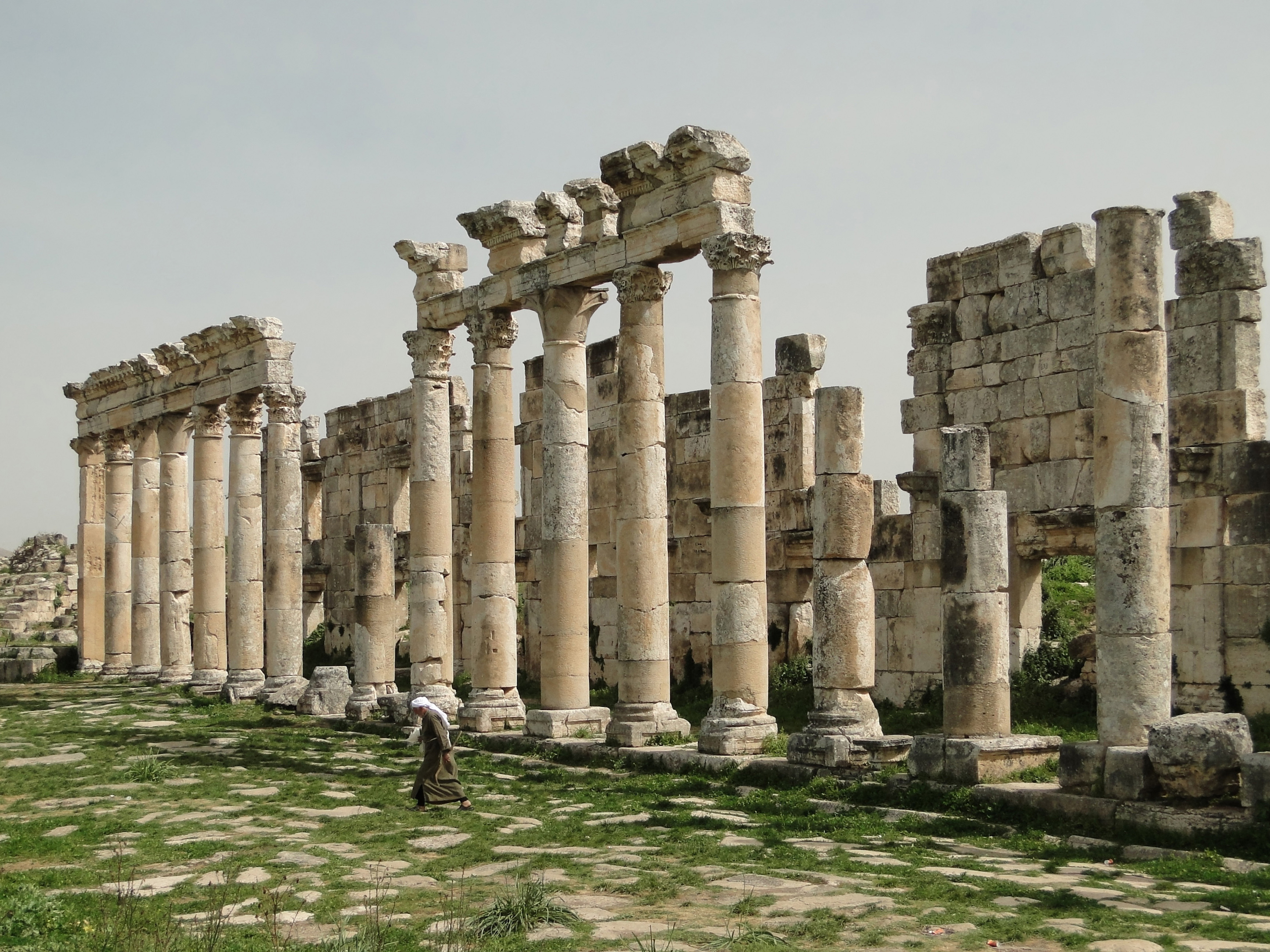
- Ruins of Apamea
Date	573
Location	Apamea, Syria
Result	Sasanian victory

Belligerents
Sasanian Empire	Byzantine Empire

Commanders and leaders
Adarmahan	

Casualties and losses
Unknown	292,000 civilian captured
- Destruction of Apamea

The sack of Apamea was a sack in 573 during the Byzantine–Sasanian War of 572–591

== History ==
When Khosrow I was besieging Dara he sent Adarmahan at the head of an army with 6,000 soldiers to invade the Roman province of Syria.He burned around the city of Antioch and entered the city of Apamea. Adarmahan thoroughly sacked and burned Apamea, and captured 292,000 civilian. Two thousand virgins whom Chos-roes was to send to the king of the Turks, chose self-immolation rather than submit to the humiliation of becoming the harem of the Turkish chagan in central Asia. The figure seems inflated, because the Persians could not have managed or fed so many prisoners and despite the demographic disaster Apamea did survive as a smaller city Apamea's great Cathedral of the East, probably containing a relic of the True Cross, was never restored. Whether this was through lack of will or resources is unclear

== Sources ==
- Greatrex, Geoffrey; Lieu, Samuel N. C., eds. (2002). The Roman Eastern Frontier and the Persian Wars (Part II, 363–630 AD). New York, New York and London, United Kingdom: Routledge (Taylor & Francis). ISBN 0-415-14687-9.
- Pirnia, Hasan; Ashtiani, Abbas Iqbal; Babaei, Parviz (2012). History of Persia (in Persian). Negah Publications. ISBN 978-9643513320.
- Martindale, John Robert; Jones, Arnold Hugh Martin; Morris, J., eds. (1992). The Prosopography of the Later Roman Empire, Volume III: A.D. 527–641. Cambridge, United Kingdom: Cambridge University Press. ISBN 978-0-521-20160-5.
- Shahîd, Irfan (1995). Byzantium and the Arabs in the Sixth Century. Washington, District of Columbia: Dumbarton Oaks. ISBN 978-0-88402-214-5.
- Maas Michael, The Cambridge Companion to the Age of Justinian
- Butcher, Kevin. Roman Syria and the Near East
