= Seleucis of Syria =

Region of the Seleucid Empire

- Region of Seleucid Empire
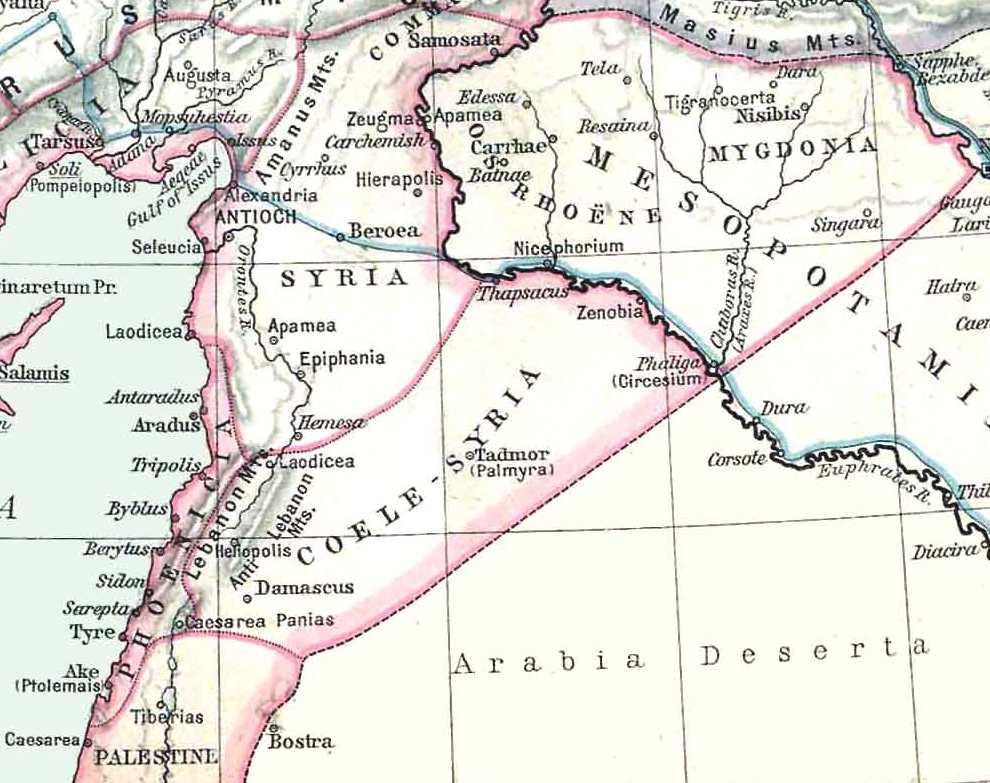
- Historical era: Hellenistic era
Succeeded by
Roman Syria
- Today part of: Syria; Turkey

Seleucis of Syria (Ancient Greek: Σελευκίς τῆς Συρίας Seleukís tês Surías) was a region of the Seleucid Empire located in northern Syria. It was also known as the Syrian Tetrapolis,

on account of its four most important cities, for it had many. These four were, Antioch, Seleuceia in Pieria, Apameia, and Laodiceia (xvi. p. 749). It also comprehended, according to Strabo, four satrapies; and it is clear that he uses the name in a much wider sense than Ptolemy, who places the four cities of the tetrapolis of Strabo's Seleucis in so many separate districts; Antioch in Cassiotis, Apameia in Apamene, Laodiceia in Laodicene, while he only implies, but does not state, that Seleuceia lies in Seleucis."

The four cities had been founded by Seleucus I Nicator;

- Antioch—named after his father and the largest city.
- Laodiceia—after his mother.
- Apameia—after his wife Apama.
- Seleuceia in Pieria—eponym of Seleucus.

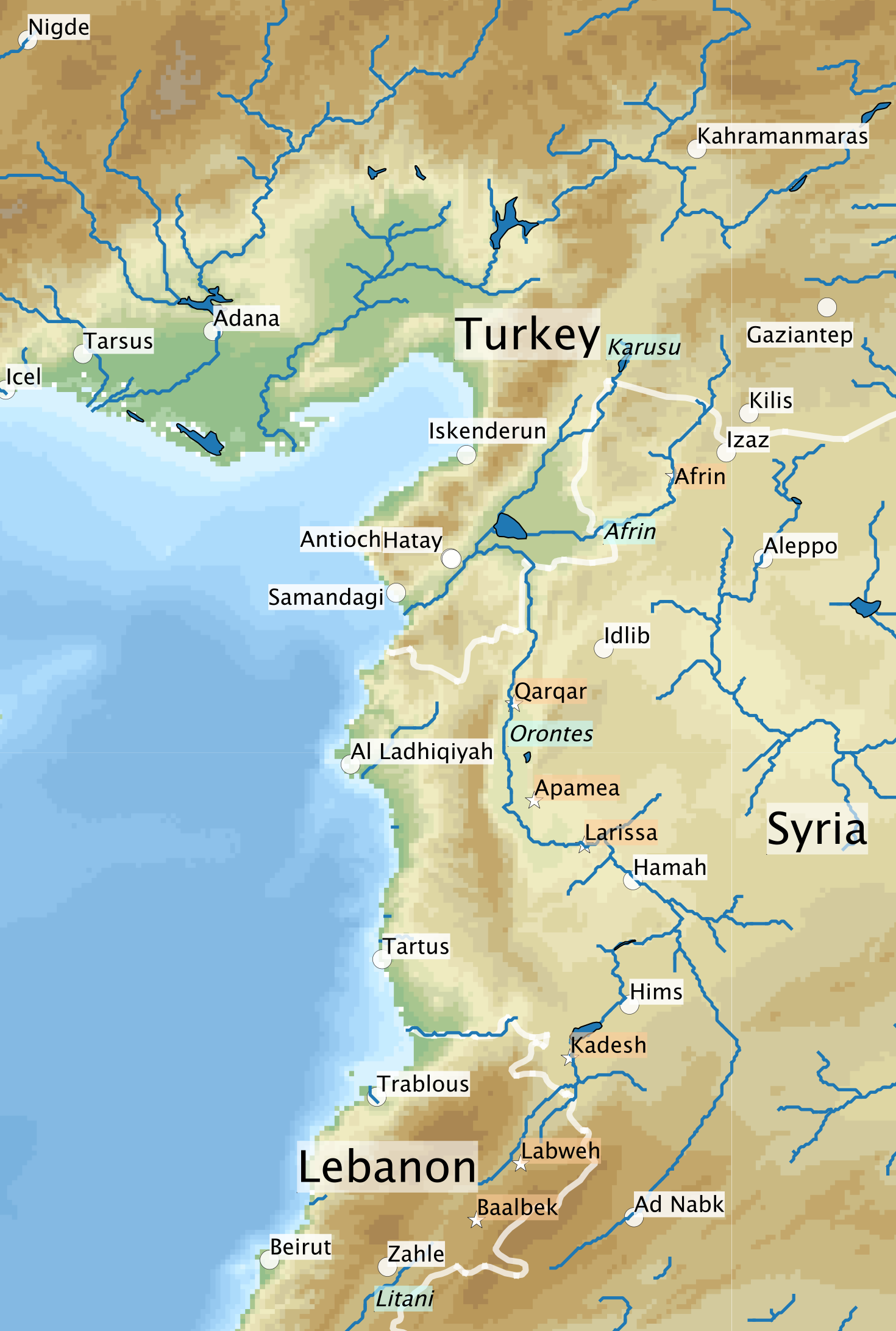
Map of the Orontes River. White lines are country borders, river names are italic on a blue background, current cities or major towns on white backgrounds, other places of significance on orange backgrounds.

== See also ==
- Syria (region)
