= Alexander of Apamea =

5th-century Bishop of Apamea

Alexander (Gr. Ἀλέξανδρος) was a bishop of Apamea in Syria in the 5th century AD. He was one of a number of moderate Eastern bishops during the Nestorian controversy, and one of the eight bishops deputed by the party of John of Antioch to the Emperor Theodosius II. Alexander was sent with his namesake, Alexander of Hierapolis, by John of Antioch to the Council of Ephesus in 431. The Alexanders brought word that John had not yet arrived in Ephesus and that the council should start without him.

A letter by Alexander is extant in Latin in the Nova Collectio Conciliorum of Étienne Baluze, p. 834. c. 132. fol, Paris, 1683.
