= Incarnation =

Divine being in physical form on Earth

Incarnation (literally, embodied in flesh or taking on flesh) is the conception and the embodiment of a deity or spirit in some earthly form or an anthropomorphic form of a deity. It is used to mean in human or animal form on Earth. The noun was originally coined to refer to the union of divinity with humanity of Jesus in Christianity.

== By religion ==
=== Abrahamic religions ===
Since the time of Maimonides, mainstream Judaism has mostly rejected any possibility of an incarnation of God in any form. Similarly, Islamic theologians upheld strict monotheism at the theoretical and doctrinal levels —categorically rejecting incarnation—; and God in the Baháʼí Faith is not seen to be part of creation as he cannot be divided and does not descend to the condition of his creatures, with the Manifestations of God not being incarnations but rather perfect mirrors reflecting the attributes of God onto the material world.

However, according to many modern scholars, the Biblical and Talmudic view of God was anthropomorphic. God could sometimes appear in bodily form. The Babylonian Talmud contains stories of earthly appearances of God, Elijah, Satan, and demons. Moreover, several traditions and beliefs categorized as "Abrahamic" do show a belief in incarnation, specially Christianity, Rastafari and the Druze faith.

==== Christianity ====
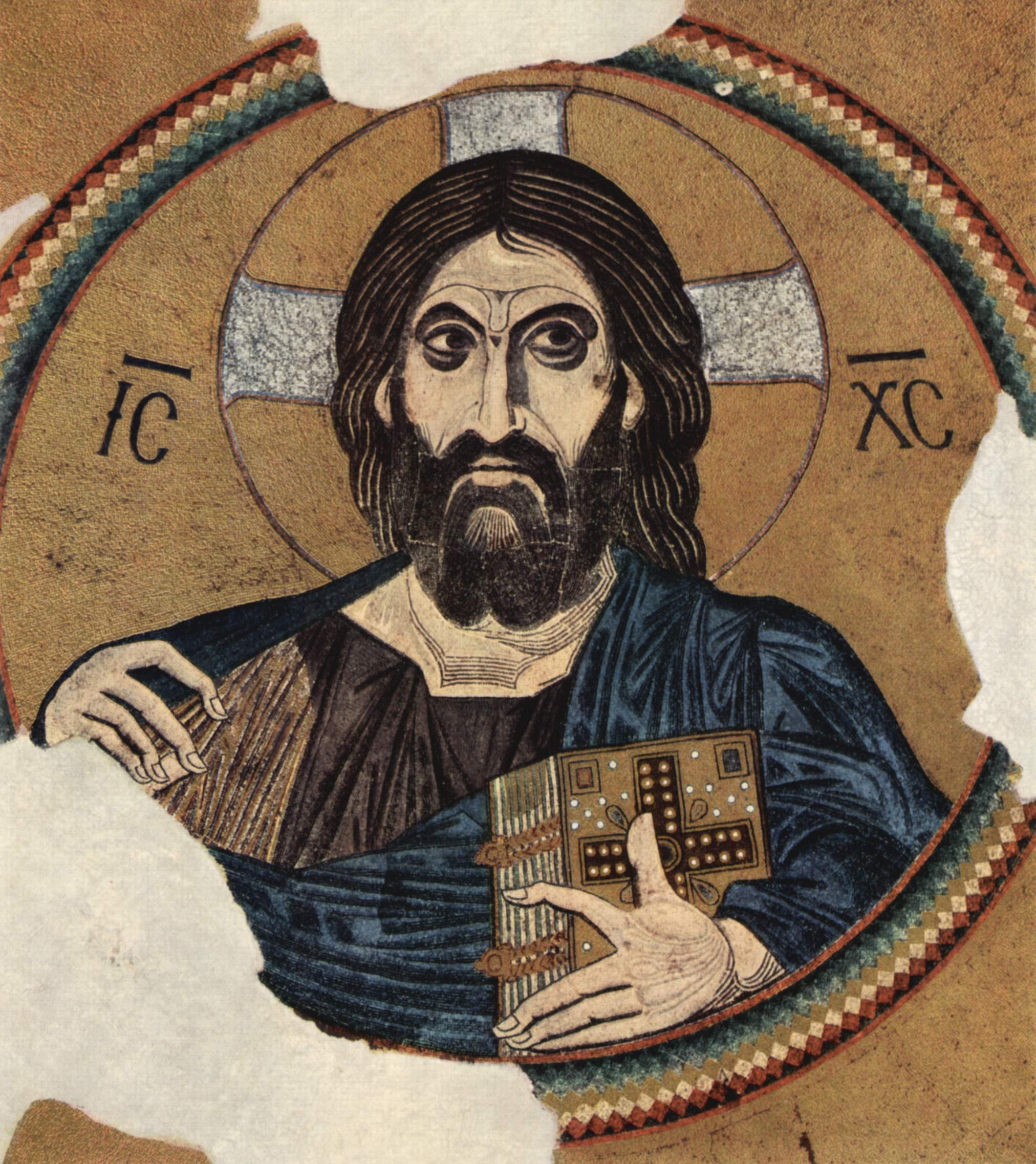
Christ Pantocrator, God incarnate in the Christian faith, shown in a mosaic from Daphni, Greece, ca. 1080–1100.

The incarnation of Christ is the central Christian doctrine that God became flesh, assumed of human nature, and became a man in the form of Jesus, the Son of God and the second person of the Trinity. This foundational Christian position holds that the divine nature of the Son of God was perfectly united with human nature in one divine Person, Jesus, making him both truly God and truly human. The theological term for this is hypostatic union: the second person of the Trinity, God the Son, became flesh when he was miraculously conceived in the womb of the Virgin Mary. Biblical passages traditionally referenced in connection with the doctrine of the Incarnation include John 3:1–21, Colossians 2:9, and Philippians 2:7–8.

==== Druze faith ====
Hamza ibn Ali ibn Ahmad is considered the founder of the Druze faith and the primary author of the Druze manuscripts, he proclaimed that God had become human and taken the form of man, al-Hakim bi-Amr Allah. al-Hakim bi-Amr Allah is an important figure in the Druze faith whose eponymous founder ad-Darazi proclaimed him as the incarnation of God in 1018.

Historian David R. W. Bryer defines the Druzes as ghulat of Isma'ilism, since they exaggerated the cult of the caliph al-Hakim bi-Amr Allah and considered him divine; he also defines the Druzes as a religion that deviated from Islam. He also added that as a result of this deviation, the Druze faith "seems as different from Islam as Islam is from Christianity or Christianity is from Judaism".

Some scholars believe Christian elements are deeply embedded in Druze beliefs, introduced through Isma’ili traditions. This is evident in the Druze creed, which deifies al-Hākim bi Amrillāh. The initiation text, "Mīthāq Walī al-Zamān" (Pact of Time Custodian), which begins with, “I rely on our Moula Al-Hakim the lonely God, the individual, the eternal,... Obedience of almighty Moulana Al-Hākim, exalted be him and that obedience is worship and that he does not have any partners ever, present or coming”, closely resembles Christian beliefs about Jesus' divinity. The Druze also view figures like Jesus, al-Hākim bi Amrillāh, and Hamza ibn Ali as the Messiah or Mahdi. They believe al-Hākim will return at the end of times to judge the world and establish his kingdom, while Hamza ibn Ali is considered a reincarnation of Jesus, the Universal Mind 'Aql, closely associated with al-Hākim.

==== Rastafari ====
Rastas refer to God as Jah, a shortened name for God used in English translations of the Bible. Rastafari emphasises the immanence of Jah, who partially resides within every person, in a manner similar to the Hindu concept of Brahman. The unity of divinity and humanity is often reflected in the saying "I and I", and the aphorism "God is man and man is God". Rastafari practices known as livity, influenced by the Nazirite vow, are seen as a way to embrace this inner divinity.

Haile Selassie I, Emperor of Ethiopia from 1930 to 1974, is traditionally seen by Rastas as the Second Coming of Jesus or Jah incarnate, and is sometimes referred to as "the living God". To others, he is a human who embodies the teachings of Christ, or a distinct human prophet who symbolises the divinity within humankind. Leonard Barrett has argued that many Rastas believe in a form of reincarnation, where Moses, Elijah, Jesus and then Haile Selassie are avatars of Jah. R. Matthew Charet has argued that Christ is a title for Rastas much as Buddha is for Buddhists, and that Christ's divine connection is not unique to Jesus but may be attained by all humans through a "discovery of the Christ-consciousness in us all".

==== Jewish and Islamic denominations ====
Some modern-day Hasidim believe in a somewhat similar concept. Menachem Mendel Schneerson, a prominent Hasidic leader, said that the Rebbe is God's essence itself put into the body of a tzadik.

Within Islam, popular piety, Sufi philosophy, textual interpretation, and mechanisms of political legitimacy have inevitably generated, from time to time, functional structures akin to incarnation (attributing divinity to a human being or a text).

=== Hinduism ===
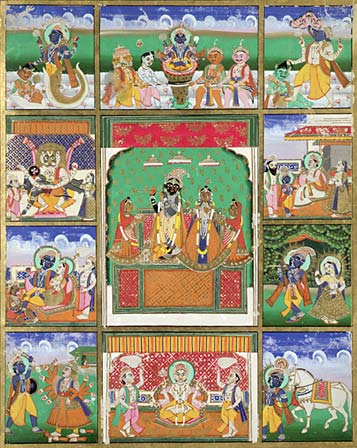
Ten incarnations of Vishnu (Matsya, Kurma, Varaha, Vamana, Balarama, Krishna, Kalki, Buddha, Parshurama, Rama & Narasimha). Painting from Jaipur, now at the Victoria and Albert Museum

In Hinduism, incarnation refers to its rebirth doctrine, and in its theistic traditions to avatar. Avatar literally means "descent, alight, to make one's appearance", and refers to the embodiment of the essence of a superhuman being or a deity in another form. The word also implies "to overcome, to remove, to bring down, to cross something". In Hindu traditions, the "crossing or coming down" is symbolism, states Daniel Bassuk, of the divine descent from "eternity into the temporal realm, from unconditioned to the conditioned, from infinitude to finitude". An avatar, states Justin Edwards Abbott, is a saguna (with form, attributes) embodiment of the nirguna Brahman or Atman (soul).

Neither the Vedas nor the Principal Upanishads ever mentions the word avatar as a noun. The verb roots and form, such as avatarana, do appear in ancient post-Vedic Hindu texts, but as "action of descending", but not as an incarnated person (avatara). The related verb avatarana is, states Paul Hacker, used with double meaning, one as action of the divine descending, another as "laying down the burden of man" suffering from the forces of evil.

The term is most commonly found in the context of the Hindu god Vishnu. The earliest mention of Vishnu manifested in a human form to empower the good and fight against evil, uses other terms such as the word sambhavāmi in verse 4.6 and the word tanu in verse 9.11 of the Bhagavad Gita, as well as other words such as akriti and rupa elsewhere. It is in medieval era texts, those composed after the sixth century CE, that the noun version of avatar appears, where it means embodiment of a deity. The incarnation idea proliferates thereafter, in the Puranic stories for many deities, and with ideas such as ansha-avatar or partial embodiments.

While avatars of other deities such as Ganesha and Shiva are also mentioned in medieval Hindu texts, this is minor and occasional. The incarnation doctrine is one of the important differences between Vaishnavism and Shaivism traditions of Hinduism.

The translation of avatar as "incarnation" has been questioned by Christian theologians, who state that an incarnation is in flesh and imperfect, while avatar is mythical and perfect. The theological concept of Christ as an incarnation into the womb of the Virgin Mary and by work of the Holy Spirit, as found in Christology, presents the Christian concept of incarnation. Mercy Amba Oduyoye and H. M. Vroom state that this is different from the Hindu concept of avatar because avatars in Hinduism are unreal and the Christian concept is similar to Docetism. Sheth disagrees and states that this claim is an incorrect understanding of the Hindu concept of avatar. (Note: Buddha, a real person, is included as an avatar of Vishnu in many Hindu texts.) Avatars are true embodiments of spiritual perfection, one driven by noble goals, in Hindu traditions such as Vaishnavism.

=== Meitei ===
In Meitei mythology and folklore, the epic cycles of incarnations in Moirang is a cyclic epic of seven incarnations (nine in some versions) of two divine lovers in the kingdom of Moirang in the realm of Ancient Kangleipak (early Manipur).

== Reincarnation ==
Buddhism teaches the rebirth doctrine, which asserts that living beings are reborn, endlessly, reincarnating as devas (gods), demi-gods, human beings, animals, hungry ghosts or hellish beings, in a cycle of samsara that stops only for those who reach nirvana (nibbana).

In Tibetan Buddhism, an enlightened spiritual teacher (lama) is believed to reincarnate, and is called a tulku. According to Tulku Thond, there are three main types of tulkus. They are the emanations of buddhas, the manifestations of highly accomplished adepts, and rebirths of highly virtuous teachers or spiritual friends. There are also authentic secondary types, which include unrecognized tulkus, blessed tulkus, and tulkus fallen from the path.

The Serer religion of West Africa rejects any notions of incarnation or manifestation of the supreme deity Roog (also called Koox in the Cangin language). However, the reincarnation (ciiɗ) of the ancient Serer saints and ancestral spirits, called Pangool, is a well-held principle in Serer religion. These Pangool (singular: Fangool) act as intermediaries between the living world and the divine. When the Serers speak of incarnation, it is these Pangool they refer to, who are themselves holy by virtue of their intercession with the divine.

== See also ==
- Arahitogami
- Kumari (goddess)
- List of people who have been considered deities
- Theophany
