= Ghayba =

Ghayba or al-Ghayba (Arabic: الغيبة, 'Occultation', 'Concealment') may refer to:

- Occultation (Islam), Shi'ite eschatological belief in the concealment and subsequent reemergence of an Imam or Mahdi, who will establish justice and peace on earth in the end of time
  - Minor Occultation, first period of concealment of the Imam (874–941) in Twelver Shi'ism, during which the twelfth and last Imam Muhammad al-Mahdi (c. 868–874) is believed to have communicated regularly with his followers through four successive agents
  - Major Occultation, second period of concealment of the Imam (941–present) in Twelver Shi'ism, during which the hidden Imam Muhammad al-Mahdi is believed to be without agent
- Kitab al-Ghayba (al-Nu'mani), sometimes simply known as al-Ghayba, a work on the occultation of Muhammad al-Mahdi by the Twelver Shi'ite scholar Muhammad ibn Ibrahim al-Nu'mani (died c. 970)
- Kitab al-Ghayba (al-Tusi), sometimes simply known as al-Ghayba, a work on the occultation of Muhammad al-Mahdi by the Twelver Shi'ite scholar Shaykh Tusi (995–1067)

== See also ==
- Rajʿa ('return'), the concomitant concept of return after occultation
- Risālat al-Ghayba, a work written in 1021 by the Druze leader Hamza ibn Ali after the disappearance of the Fatimid Imam-caliph al-Hakim bi-Amr Allah (985–1021), announcing al-Hakim's occultation
- Risālat al-Ghayba, a work written in 1042 by Hamza ibn Ali's pupil Baha al-Din al-Muqtana, announcing the suspension of Druze missionary activity due to the imminence of the end times
