= Al-Darazi =

11th-century Ismaili preacher and early leader of the Druze faith

- الدرزي
- Born: Muhammad ibn Isma'il; 10th century Bukhara, Abbasid Caliphate
- Died: 1018; Cairo, Fatimid Caliphate
- Cause of death: Execution
- Occupation: Preacher
- Years active: 11th century
- Known for: Ismaili preacher, early Druze leader

Muhammad ibn Isma'il al-Darazi (Arabic: محمد بن إسماعيل الدرزي, romanized: Muḥammad ibn Ismāʿīl al-Darazī; died 1018) was an 11th-century Isma'ili preacher and early leader of the Druze faith who was labeled a heretic in 1016 and subsequently executed in 1018 by the Fatimid caliph al-Hakim bi-Amr Allah (r. 996–1021).

== Life ==
Little information is known about the early life of al-Darazi. According to most sources, he was born in Bukhara (modern-day Uzbekistan). He is believed to have been of Persian origin and his title Darazi is Persian, meaning 'the tailor', although some sources state that he could be of Turkic descent. He arrived in Cairo in 1015, or 1017, after which he joined the newly emerged Druze movement which had emerged from Isma'ilism. He was also known as Nashtakin.

Al-Darazi was converted to be one of the early preachers of the Unity faith (which became known as the Druze faith). At that time, the movement enlisted a large number of adherents. However, he was later considered a renegade and is usually described by the Druze as following the traits of Satan, in particular, arrogance.

This view is based on the observation that as the number of his followers grew, he became obsessed with his leadership and gave himself the title “The Sword of the Faith” (Sayf ad-Dīn). In the Epistles of Wisdom, Hamza ibn Ali warns al-Darazi, saying, “Faith does not need a sword to aid it.” ad-Dīn la yahtāj ilā sayf lī yansurāh. However, al-Darazi ignored Hamza's warnings and continued to challenge the Imam. This attitude led to disputes between al-Darazi and Hamza ibn Ali, who disliked his behaviour. Al-Darazi argued that he should be the leader of the Da’wa rather than Hamza ibn Ali and gave himself the title “Lord of the Guides”, because Caliph al-Hakim referred to Hamza as “Guide of the Consented”.

By 1018, al-Darazi had gathered around him partisans – "Darazites" – who believed that universal reason became incarnated in Adam at the beginning of the world, was then passed from him to the prophets, then into Ali and hence into his descendants, the Fatimid Caliphs. Al-Darazi wrote a book laying out this doctrine. He read from his book in the principal mosque in Cairo, which caused riots and protests against his claims and many of his followers were killed. Hamza ibn Ali refuted his ideology calling him "the insolent one and Satan". The controversy created by al-Darazi led Caliph al-Hakim to suspend the Druze da'wa in 1018 AD.

In an attempt to gain the support of al-Hakim, al-Darazi started preaching that al-Hakim and his ancestors were the incarnation of God.

It is believed that al-Darazi allowed wine, forbidden marriages and taught metempsychosis although it has been argued that his actions might have been exaggerated by contemporary and later historians and polemicists.

== Death ==
An inherently modest man, al-Hakim did not believe that he was God, and felt al-Darazi was trying to depict himself as a new prophet. Al-Hakim preferred Hamza ibn Ali ibn Ahmad over him and al-Darazi was executed in 1018, leaving Hamza the sole leader of the new faith.

== Aftermath ==
Even though the Druze do not consider al-Darazi the founder of their faith (rather, they refer to him as their "first heretic"), rival groups probably attached the name of the controversial preacher to the new sect and it has stuck with them ever since. Druze refer to themselves as "unitarians" (al-Muwahhidūn).
