= Epistles of Wisdom =

Druze work by al-Hakim bi-Amr Allah

- رَسَائِل ٱلْحِكْمَة; Rasāʾil al-Ḥikma

Information
- Religion: Druze
- Author: Hamza ibn Ali ibn Ahmad; Isma'il ibn Muhammad al-Tamimi; Baha al-Din al-Muqtana
- Language: Arabic
- Period: c. 1017 – c. 1043

The Epistles of Wisdom (Arabic: رَسَائِل ٱلْحِكْمَة, romanized: Rasāʾil al-Ḥikma) is a corpus of sacred texts and pastoral letters by teachers of the Druze faith native to the Levant, which has currently close to a million practitioners. The text revolves around the acknowledgement and worship of al-Hakim bi-Amr Allah as the last and definite incarnation of the One God, a belief which Druze define as 'Monotheism' (Arabic: Tawhid).

== The Druze canon ==
The full Druze canon or Druze scripture includes the Old Testament (Hebrew Bible), the New Testament, the Quran and philosophical works by Plato and those influenced by Socrates among works from other religions and philosophers. The Druze claim that an understanding of these is necessary, but that their al-ʻUqqāl (عقال), "the Knowledgeable Initiates", have access to writings of their own that supersede these.

The Epistles of Wisdom are also referred to as the Kitab al-Hikma (Book of Wisdom) and al-Hikma al-Sharifa. Other ancient Druze writings include the Rasa'il al-Hind (Epistles of India) and the previously lost (or hidden) manuscripts such as al-Munfarid bi-Dhatihi and al-Sharia al-Ruhaniyya as well as others including didactic and polemic treatises.

Druze manuscripts are generally written in a language, grammar, and diction that to the uninitiated is hard to understand and includes ambiguous words and highly obscure and cryptic phrases, in addition to the extensive usage of symbology and numerology in much of the writings.

The Druze religious establishment's interpretation of taqiyya (تقیة) and the esoteric nature of the faith led to the restriction of access, inquiry and investigation from even their own uninitiated Druze known as al-Juhhāl (جهال) ("the Ignorant") or jismaniyeen ("the Material Ones"). Such restrictions aimed to prevent possible damage to the individual and community if the writings were interpreted incorrectly, since the study of the Epistles of Wisdom is better accompanied by commentary texts and guidance from the higher ranking Druze Uqqal ("Knowledgeable Ones").

== Description ==
The Epistles of Wisdom were written in the Arabic language and contain 111 epistles in total. They are organised into six books first compiled by one of the greatest Druze sages, Abd Allah al-Tanukhi, in 1479 AD. According to oral traditions, there were originally 24 books. Eighteen of them are reasonably assumed to have been lost, hidden or destroyed. Epistle 6 is dated earliest and was written in July 1017 AD by Hamza ibn-'Ali ibn-Ahmad. He is specifically mentioned as the author of 30 more epistles in the first two books, namely epistles 5–35. Epistles 109 and 110 are dated latest, written by al-Muqtana Baha'uddin in 1042 AD. Epistles 36 to 40 are attributed to Isma'il al-Tamimi ibn Muhammad. The first epistle opens with a goodbye message from al-Hakim bi-Amr Allah, the embodied deity in the Druze faith. He details his efforts to assist his people's welfare and peace and urges them to remain upright. It is believed by the Druze from interpretation of the epistles that al-Hakim did not die but merely withdrew into occultation. He will return one day and reveal the Druze wisdom to the world in order to inaugurate a golden age.

=== Contents ===
The epistles contain philosophical discourses about Neoplatonic and Gnostic subjects, Ptolemaic cosmology, Arabic paraphrases of the philosophies of Farabi, Plotinus and Proclus, and writings on the Universal Soul. There are also several polemic epistles concerning other faiths and philosophies that were present during that time, and towards individuals who were considered renegades or those who tried to distort and tarnish the reputation of the faith and its teachings, such as the "Answering the Nusayri" epistle and the fifth volume of the Epistles. Most of the Epistles are written in a post-classical language, often showing similarities to Arab Christian authors.

The texts provide insight into Druze beliefs about the incorporation of the Universal Intellect and the soul of the world in 11th century Egypt, when the deity showed itself to men through Fatimid Caliph al-Hakim and his doctrines. These display a notable form of Arabic Neoplatonism blended with Ismailism and adopted Christian elements of great interest for the philosophy and history of religions.

=== List of epistles ===
The first 40 epistles, from Volumes 1 and 2, are listed below. Epistles 1–14 make up Volume 1, while epistles 15–40 make up Volume 2. The English titles (translated from the French titles in De Smet's 2007 French translation) and Arabic transliterations are provided for each of the epistles.

No.	English	Arabic
1	Copy of the edict posted in mosques regarding the occultation of Our Lord, Imam al-Hakim	Nusḫat as-siǧill allaḏī wuǧida muʿallaqan ʿala l-masāhid fī ġaybat Mawlānā al-Imām al-Ḥākim
2	Edict concerning the prohibition of wine	As-Siǧill al-manhī fīhi ʿan al-ḫamr
3	Story about Jews and Christians	Ḫabar al-Yahūd wa n-Naṣārā
4	Copy of the letter written by the Carmathian	Nusḫa mā katabahu al-Qarmaṭī
5	Pact of allegiance to the Lord of this time	Mīṯāq Walī az-Zamān
6	The hidden destruction	An-naqḍ al-ḫafī
7	The beginning of the profession of Oneness through the preaching of the Truth	Badw at-tawḥīd li-daʿwat al-ḥaqq
8	The pact of allegiance of women	Mīṯāq an-nisā’
9	Initiation and the ultimate degree in the Unitarian doctrine	Risālat al-balāġ wa n-nihāya fi t-tawḥīd
10	The supreme limit and good advice	Al-Ġāya wa n-naṣīḥa
11	Writing exposing the true meaning of the banter that takes place before Our Lord	Kitāb fīhi ḥaqā’iq mā yaẓhar quddāma Mawlānā ǧalla ḏikruhu min al-hazl
12	The Straight Path	As-Sīra al-mustaqīma
13	The unveiling of Truths	Kašf al-ḥaqā’iq
14	The Cause of causes, or the treasure of the believer who has answered the call	Sabab al-asbāb wa l-kanz liman ayqana wa-staǧāba
15	The treaty that annihilates the impious	Ar-Risāla ad-dāmiġa lil-fāsiq
16	Assent and submission	Ar-riḍā wa t-taslīm
17	Epistle on transcendence, addressed to all Unitarians	Risālat at-tanzīh ilā ǧamāʿat al-muwaḥḥidīn
18	The great epistle of women	Risālat an-nisā’ al-kabīra
19	The morning of al-Kā’ina	Aṣ-Ṣubḥa al-Kā’ina
20	Copy of the edict concerning the appointment of al-Muǧtabā (“the Chosen One”)	Nusḫat siǧill al-Muǧtabā
21	The investiture of ar-Riḍā, the Representative of Power (safir al-qudra)	Taqlīd ar-Riḍā safir al-qudra
22	Copy of the investiture of al-Muqtanā	Nusḫat taqlīd al-Muqtanā
23	Letter to the inhabitants of al-Kudya al-Bayḍā’	Mukātaba ilā ahl al-Kudya al-Bayḍā
24	Letter from al-Anṣinā’	Risālat al-Anṣinā’
25	Disposition of the Imām, the Master of Unveiling	Šart al-Imām ṣāḥib al-kašf
26	Letter sent to the heir to the throne	Ar-Risāla allatī ursilat ilā walī al-ʿahd
27	Letter to Ḫumār b. Ǧayš as-Sulaymānī al-‘Akkāwī	Risālat Ḫumār b. Ǧayš as-Sulaymānī al-ʿAkkāwī
28	Letter sent to the Judge	Ar-Risāla al-munfaḏa ila l-qāḍī
29	The intimate conversation of the Friend of Truth	Al-Munāǧā, munāǧāt walī al-ḥaqq
30	Answered prayer	Ad-Duʿā’ al-mustaǧāb
31	Sanctification. Prayer of the Sincere Believers	At-Taqdīs duʿā’ as-sādiqīn
32	Remembering the Knowledge of the Imam	Ḏikr maʿrifat al-lmām
33	Epistle of Warning and Exhortation	Risālat at-taḥḏīr wa t-tanbīh
34	The Warning and the Admonition	Al-Iʿḏār wa l-inḏār
35	The Letter of Occultation	Risālat al-ġayba
36	The Division of Sciences	Kitāb fīhi taqsīm al-ʿulūm
37	Treatise on Tinder	Risālat az-zinād
38	The Epistle of the Candle	Risālat aš-šamʿa
39	The Straight Path and the Right Direction	Ar-Rušd wa l-hidāya
40	Poem of the Soul	Šiʿr an-nafs

== Translations ==
A Syrian physician gave one of the first Druze manuscripts to Louis XIV in 1700, which is now kept in the Bibliothèque Nationale. Various conflicts, such as the invasion of Ibrahim Pasha between 1831 and 1838, along with the 1860 Lebanon conflict, caused some of these texts to fall into the hands of academics. Other original manuscripts are held in the Robert Garrett collection at Princeton University. The first French translation was published in 1838 by linguist and orientalist Antoine Isaac, Baron Silvestre de Sacy in Exposé de la religion des Druzes.

In 1986, a transcription of all 111 epistles was published by Father Joseph Azzi in Lebanon. Together, they make up 5–6 volumes. However, this edition of the Rasa'il al-hikma was published at the time by pseudonymous writers in Lebanon as part of the highly controversial "The Hard Truth" series. The series included several anti-Druze, anti-Alawite, and anti-Islamic books. It was banned by the authorities for containing misleading information and hate speech. Additionally, an unpublished dissertation by David Bryer was prepared for the first two volumes.

In 2007, a French translation and critical examination of these first two volumes (epistles 1–40) from the Epistles of Wisdom was published by CNRS researcher Daniel De Smet. De Smet has provided a doctrinal introduction, notes, a description and inventory of the manuscripts, and studies of their contents and characteristics.
