= Baha al-Din al-Muqtana =

Druze religious leader

Abu al-Hasan Ali ibn Ahmad al-Sammuqi (Arabic: أبو الحسن علي بن أحمد السموقي, romanized: Abu al-Ḥasan ʿAlī ibn Aḥmad al-Sammuqī; 979 - died 1043), better known as Baha al-Din al-Muqtana (Arabic: بهاء الدين المقتنى, romanized: Bahāʾ al-Dīn al-Muqtanā), was an 11th-century Isma'ili missionary, and one of the founders of the Druze religion. His early life is obscure, but he may have been a Fatimid official. By 1020 he was one of the chief disciples of the founder of the Druze faith, Hamza ibn Ali. The disappearance of Fatimid caliph al-Hakim bi-Amr Allah, considered by the Druze to be the manifestation of God, in 1021, inaugurated a period of anti-Druze persecution. Al-Muqtana took over the leadership of the remnants of the Druze movement in 1027, and led the missionary activity (the "divine call") of the widely scattered Druze communities until 1042, when he issued his farewell epistle (Risālat al-Ghayba, 'Epistle of Occultation'), in which he announced his retirement and the closing of the divine call due to the imminence of the end times. The Druze have been a closed community ever since. Al-Muqtana's epistles comprise four of the six books of the Druze scripture, the Epistles of Wisdom.

== Origin and early life ==
Al-Muqtana's life is largely unknown, apart from the information contained in his own writings. His name was Abu al-Hasan Ali ibn Ahmad, and he was born in the village of Sammuqa, near Aleppo in northern Syria. The familiarity with Christian theology and Christian literature exhibited in his writings suggests that he may have been originally a Christian.

His early career is unknown. Sami Nasib Makarim identified him with the Fatimid general and governor of Apamea, Ali ibn Ahmad al-Dayf, who captured Aleppo in 1015/16, but this identification is considered spurious by other scholars. Later Druze tradition ascribes him only the position of qāḍī in Alexandria, under caliph al-Hakim bi-Amr Allah (r. 996–1021).

== Early career as Druze missionary ==
The name al-Muqtanā, by which he is known, was chosen by the original founder of the Druze faith, Hamza, and means "the Acquired One". During Hamza's lifetime, al-Muqtana was apparently one of the chief dignitaries of the nascent Druze faith. According to Hamza's writings, al-Hakim, like almost all Fatimid caliphs before him, was nothing less than God incarnate, with Hamza himself as the first of five ministers (ḥudūd, "ranks"). In this schema, al-Muqtanna was the fifth minister, with the titles of "the Left Wing" (al-Janāḥ al-Aysar) and "the Follower" (al-Tālī).

Druze tradition mentions him among the twelve who, in June 1019 joined with Hamza, in resisting the attacks of a mob of supposedly more than 20,000 men against the Druze movement's headquarters, the Raydan Mosque in Cairo. However, the first firm evidence on his life is the diploma of investiture issued by Hamza, which is dated 2 December 1020.

== Leadership of the Druze ==
On the night of 13 February 1021, Caliph al-Hakim disappeared during one of his usual nightly rides, likely the victim of a palace conspiracy. Power was seized by his sister, Sitt al-Mulk, as regent for al-Hakim's son, al-Zahir (r. 1021–1036). The new regime quickly reversed many of al-Hakim's controversial policies, instituting a return to Isma'ili orthodoxy. As part of this Isma'ili reaction, the Fatimid authorities launched a severe persecution against the Druze movement. The seven Islamic years that followed (411–418 AH) are a period of silence in the Druze sources. During this time, the movement's hierarchy was decimated: Hamza himself had to flee to Mecca, where he was soon after executed, and nothing further is known of the next three ministers after him.

Al-Muqtana survived the persecution, having gone in hiding. His first known writing bears the date July/August 1027 CE (Jumada II 418 AH). At this point, the intensity of the persecution may have been reduced somewhat, allowing the scattered and decimated Druze movement to begin reconstituting itself in secret, now under al-Muqtana's leadership.

His numerous epistles show the extent of the Druze missionary network, which appears to have been present almost everywhere where the Fatimid-sponsored Isma'ili daʿwa was also active: Cairo and Upper Egypt, Syria, Upper Mesopotamia and Lower Mesopotamia, Persia, the Yemen, and the Hijaz. He even sent letters to the ruler of Multan, the Byzantine emperors Constantine VII and Michael IV the Paphlagonian, Jewish communities and Christian Church leaders, as well as the leader of the Qarmatians of Bahrayn, either admonishing them for having abandoned the true faith, or exhorting them to repent and convert before the imminent end times.

Upper Egypt appears to have been one of the centres of the early Druze movement, as al-Muqtana installed a missionary (dāʿī) there, but the main area of activity was Palestine, Syria, and Upper Mesopotamia, particularly in the more remote, mountainous areas where Fatimid authority was remote and ineffective. In his epistle of July/August 1027, al-Muqtana appointed a certain Sukayn as the chief missionary over all of Palestine, Jordan and southern Syria, giving him the authority to appoint twelve dāʿīs and six deputies (maʾdhūn) there. However, Sukayn soon fell away from al-Muqtana's leadership, introducing his own innovations into Druze doctrine. Al-Muqtana also sent epistles to another important centre of the Druze at that time, the Jabal al-Sumaq in northern Syria. Nominally Byzantine, the mountain massif was located in the no-man's-land between the Fatimid Caliphate and the Byzantine Empire. In the winter of 1031/32, the local Druze population launched an open rebellion, destroying the mosques of the local villages, and forcing the Byzantine governor of Antioch and the Fatimid governor of Aleppo to launch a joint expedition against the Druze.

As the long-standing feud with Sukayn shows, al-Muqtana's main concern was to keep the various Druze communities loyal and united in doctrine. In his epistles, he emphasized the imminence of the end times and the return of Hamza. The earthquakes that shook Palestine and Syria in 1034 were thus interpreted as signs of doom; just as the earthquakes brought down many churches, the same fate would soon befall Mecca, the "capital of satans and demons". His conflicts with Sukayn and another dāʿī, Ibn al-Kurdi, led to the slackening of the Druze movement and its missionary effort.

== Retirement and aftermath ==
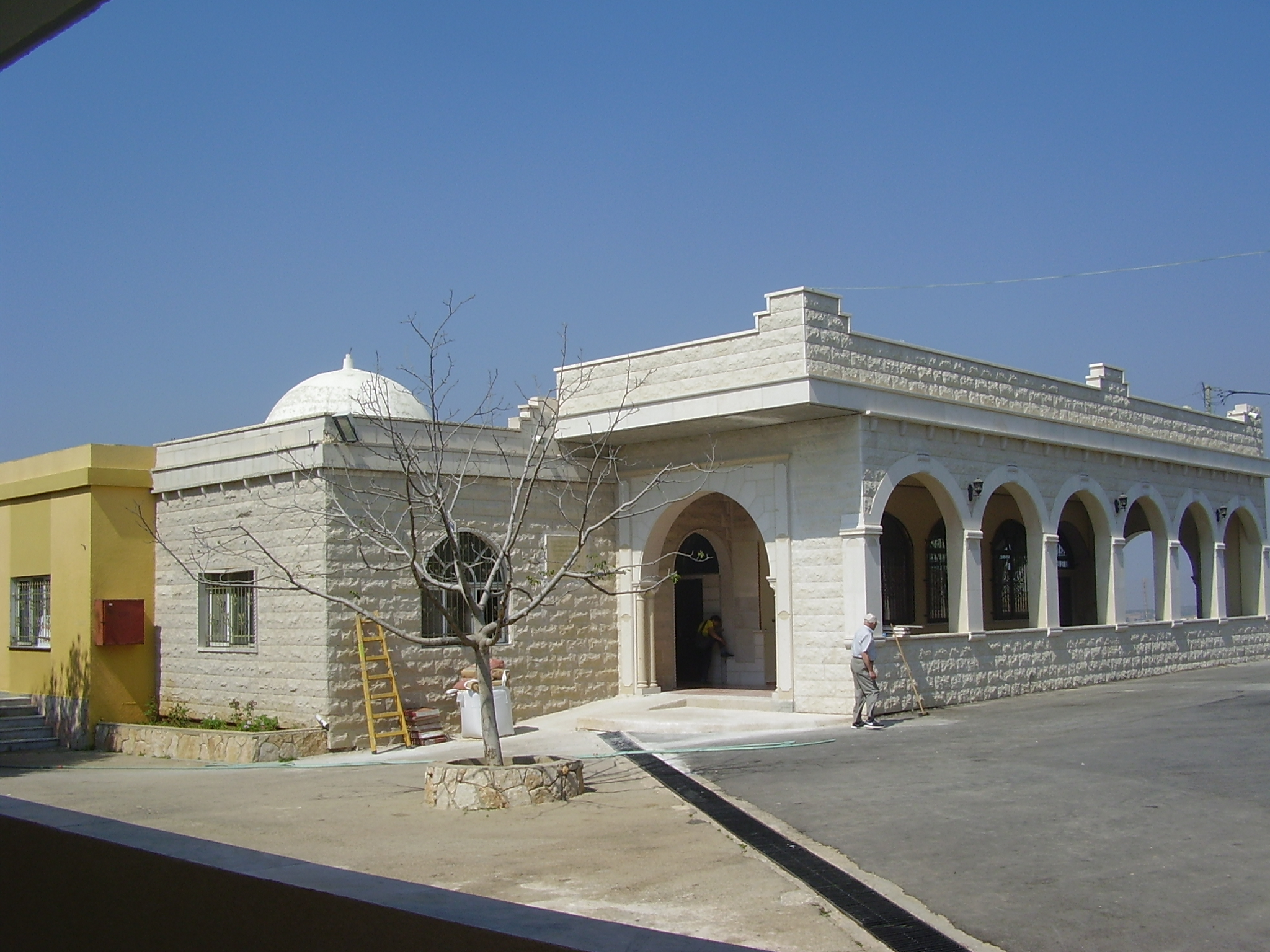
Shrine of Baha al-Din in the Druze village of Beitegen, Israel

A shrine dedicated to Baha al-Din, probably identical with al-Muqtana, is located at the Druze village of Beitegen in Upper Galilee, Israel. Al-Muqtana remained the head of the Druze missionary movement until 1042, when he issued his farewell epistle (Risālat al-Ghayba, 'Epistle of Occultation'), in which he announced his retirement into concealment (ghayba). Nothing further is known about him after that. (Note: Al-Muqtana's Risālat al-Ghayba ('Epistle of Occultation', written in 1042) is not to be confused with a treatise of the same name written in 1021 by his master Hamza ibn Ali.) In this final epistle, he again reiterated the imminent coming of the end times and the Last Judgment under al-Hakim, where truth would be made manifest, so that his own activity was no longer necessary. Until then, he ordered his followers to conceal their allegiance and even denounce him by name, if necessary.

This marked the end of the Druze "divine call", i.e., its active missionary phase. Since then, the Druze have been a closed community, in which neither conversion nor apostasy is allowed. The 71 epistles of al-Muqtana, together with those of Hamza and the second minister, Isma'il ibn Muhammad al-Tamimi, that he compiled, form the scripture of the Druze faith, the Epistles of Wisdom (Rasāʾil al-Ḥikma) or Exalted Wisdom (al-Ḥikma al-Sharīfa). Of its six books, the first two contain the work of Hamza and others, while the remaining four encompass al-Muqtana's writings.

== Sources ==
- Abu-Izeddin, Nejla (1993) [1984]. The Druzes: A New Study of Their History, Faith, and Society (Second ed.). Leiden, New York, Köln: Brill. ISBN 90-04-09705-8.
- Daftary, Farhad (2007). The Ismāʿı̄lı̄s: Their History and Doctrines (Second ed.). Cambridge: Cambridge University Press. ISBN 978-0-521-61636-2.
- De Smet, Daniel (2017). "Ḥamza b. ʿAlī". In Fleet, Kate; Krämer, Gudrun; Matringe, Denis; Nawas, John; Rowson, Everett (eds.). Encyclopaedia of Islam (3rd ed.). Brill Online. doi:10.1163/1573-3912_ei3_COM_30281. ISSN 1873-9830.
- Halm, Heinz (2003). Die Kalifen von Kairo: Die Fāṭimiden in Ägypten, 973–1074 [The Caliphs of Cairo: The Fatimids in Egypt, 973–1074] (in German). Munich: C. H. Beck. ISBN 3-406-48654-1.
- Kratschkowsky, I. & Halm, Heinz (1993). "al-Muḳtanā". In Bosworth, C. E.; van Donzel, E.; Heinrichs, W. P. & Pellat, Ch. (eds.). The Encyclopaedia of Islam, Second Edition. Volume VII: Mif–Naz. Leiden: E. J. Brill. p. 544. doi:10.1163/1573-3912_islam_SIM_5483. ISBN 978-90-04-09419-2.
- Makarim, Sami Nasib (1974). The Druze Faith. Caravan Books. ISBN 978-0-88206-003-3.
