= Hamza ibn Ali =

Persian Isma'ili missionary and founder of the Druze faith (c. 985–c. 1021)

Hamza ibn Ali ibn Ahmed
- Born: 985; Zuzan, Khurasan, Samanid Empire
- Died: 1021; Mecca, Sharifate of Mecca (according to one claim)
- Cause of death: Decapitation (according to one claim)
- Years active: c. 1017–1021
- Known for: Founder of the Druze religion
- Opponents: Isma'ilis; Sunnis

Hamza ibn Ali ibn Ahmed (Arabic: حمزة بن علي بن أحمد, romanized: Ḥamza ibn ‘Alī ibn ʾAḥmad; c. 985–c. 1021) was an 11th-century Persian Ismai'li missionary and founding leader of the Druze. He was born in Zuzan in Greater Khorasan in Samanid-ruled Persia (modern Khaf, Razavi Khorasan Province, Iran), and preached his heterodox strand of Isma'ilism in Cairo during the reign of the Fatimid caliph al-Hakim bi-Amr Allah.

Despite opposition from the established Isma'ili clergy, Hamza persisted, apparently being tolerated or even patronized by al-Hakim himself, and set up a parallel hierarchy of missionaries in Egypt and Syria. Following al-Hakim's disappearance—or, most likely, assassination—in February 1021, Hamza and his followers were persecuted by the new regime. Hamza himself announced his retirement in his final epistle to his followers, in which he also promised that al-Hakim would soon return and usher in the end times. Hamza disappeared thereafter, although one contemporary source claims that he fled to Mecca, where he was recognized and executed. His disciple Baha al-Din al-Muqtana resumed Hamza's missionary effort in 1027–1042, finalizing the doctrines of the Druze faith.

== Life ==
=== Origin ===
The life of Hamza ibn Ali and his exact role in the birth of the Druze movement are not entirely clear, as the chief sources about him—the contemporary Christian chronicler Yahya of Antioch, the Muslim historian Ibn Zafir, and Hamza's own epistles—are often contradictory.

According to Ibn Zafir, Hamza ibn Ali was born in Zuzan in Khurasan, and was originally a felt-maker. He emigrated to Fatimid Egypt, and does not appear to have been active before 1017/18, although he may have been present in Cairo already in 1013, as he describes the events surrounding the appointment of Abd al-Rahim ibn Ilyas as heir-apparent (walī ʿahd al-muslimīn) by the Fatimid caliph, al-Hakim bi-Amr Allah (r. 996–1021).

=== Background: the Isma'ili daʿwa under al-Hakim ===
At that time, the Isma'ili movement (daʿwa), the state religion of the Fatimid Caliphate, was in turmoil due to the emergence of heterodox beliefs. These were propagated by al-Hasan ibn Haydara al-Farghani al-Akhram, an Isma'ili from the Farghana Valley. His teachings are only indirectly known, from the polemic writings refuting them by the Isma'ili dāʿī, Hamid al-Din al-Kirmani. According to al-Kirmani, al-Akhram preached the imminence of the end times, when formal religion and religious law (the sharīʿa) would be abolished and replaced with the pure, original paradisical worship of God. Such antinomian and millennialist concepts had been a core component of early Isma'ilism. However, as the Fatimid regime consolidated itself and the early Isma'ili messianic promise was relegated into the far future, the official doctrine of the Fatimid imam–caliphs had firmly rejected these potentially revolutionary tenets.

The most explosive of al-Akhram's views, however, was that the line of the imams was at an end, and that God was made manifest in the person of Caliph al-Hakim, who accordingly was the expected messiah, the al-Qāʾim. This too, was not new: several Shi'a groups, known as the "extremists" (ghulāt) had tended to deify their imams, starting already with Ali (r. 656–661). The fact that Fatimid theologians such as Qadi al-Nu'man continued to condemn such views as heresy in the late 10th century shows their continued currency. Although entirely heretical according to official Fatimid doctrine, al-Hakim not only appears to have tolerated the propagation of such concepts, but reportedly also counted al-Akhram among his close associates, leading to widespread speculation among contemporaries that al-Akhram's heretical ideas were not only approved of, but even originated by, the Caliph. Al-Akhram also tried to win over officials to his cause by sending them letters to that effect. Al-Akhram was murdered in January/February 1018 (or 1019, according to Halm), while accompanying the Caliph on a horseback ride. Al-Hakim's reaction to the event—the murderer was swiftly executed, and the victim buried in rich clothes brought from the palace—only served to deepen suspicion that he sympathized with al-Akhram's views. However, in the aftermath of the murder, al-Hakim cut off contact with al-Akhram's followers, and the movement he had started became dormant for a while.

=== Start of Hamza's mission ===
Hamza also followed similar teachings: he established himself at a mosque on the Raydan Canal, outside the city gate of Bab al-Nasr, and there expounded the view that in al-Hakim, God had become incarnate. He adopted the title of "leader of the adepts" (hādi al-mustajībīn), and his following quickly grew. According to the medieval chroniclers, he too enjoyed signs of favour from al-Hakim: when he complained to the Caliph that his life was in danger, he was given weapons, which he demonstratively hung on every entrance to the Raydan Mosque. It is unclear when exactly Hamza began his mission. The earliest of his epistles to contain a date comes from July 1017. In the previous, undated fifth epistle, Hamza had declared a new oath (mīṭāq) to his followers, who were for the first time referred to as "The People of Monotheism" (al-Muwaḥḥidun). In it, they pledged to abandon every previous allegiance and swear obedience to "our Lord al-Hakim, the One, the Unique, the Sole One" and to place themselves at his disposal body and soul, including all their possessions and even their children.

Al-Hakim is generally portrayed in the historical sources to have been favourably disposed towards Hamza's movement. Modern historians are more skeptical about claims—mostly transmitted by hostile Sunni historians—that the Caliph actually instigated the new doctrine himself. The historian David R. W. Bryer writes that "al-Hakim played no active part in building up what was to be the Druze daʿwa, nor, astute politician that he was, did he hesitate to withdraw all visible support from the movement in times of real difficulty", and that he "did not wish to be seen to be involved in the movement that was forming until he saw how the majority of the people reacted to it". Indeed, due to the disturbances provoked by the new doctrine, the Caliph forced Hamza to suspend his mission during the following year (409 AH, 1018/19 CE), which is thus not counted in the Druze calendar (which starts with the year 408 AH). It is only from May 1019 (in 410 AH), that Hamza resumed his activity, presumably with the Caliph's permission.

=== Hamza and al-Darzi ===
Although Hamza was the real founder of the Druze religion, it received its name by another like-minded propagandist—and soon to become rival—the Turk al-Darazi (probably derived from the Persian word for tailor). From him, the followers of Hamza became known as the "Darzites" (darzīya) and "Druzes" (from the broken plural form durūz). The exact relation between Hamza and al-Darzi is unclear. Yahya of Antioch presents him as a disciple of Hamza, but Ibn Zafir has it the other way round.

The modern historian Marshall Hodgson attempted to discern doctrinal differences between the two, positing that al-Darzi was still within the limits of Isma'ilism, while Hamza's teachings about al-Hakim's divinity effectively put his doctrine outside the boundaries not only of Isma'ilism, but of Islam in general. This thesis was rejected by Bryer, and al-Darzi is now considered by historians as a particularly zealous adherent of al-Hakim's divinity, writing letters to senior Fatimid officials and commanders urging them to join him. Indeed, in his epistles, Hamza is critical of his colleague, both for al-Darzi's disputing Hamza's role as the leader of their movement, as well as for his followers' over-zealous, extremist and provocative actions, which revealed the movement's ideas prematurely and placed it under danger of attack.

=== The Day of al-Kāʾina ===
According to Yahya of Antioch, the chief opponent of the doctrines propagated by Hamza and al-Darzi was the leader of the established Isma'ili daʿwa, the Turkish chief missionary (dāʿī al-duʿāt), Qut Tegin. Indeed, the Turkish ghilmān (slave soldiers) of the Fatimid army appear to have been generally opposed to the new teachings. During this time, the followers of the rival leaders engaged in regular brawls in the streets of Cairo, cursing one another as infidels.

The conflict between the two parties came to a head at the Amr ibn al-As Mosque at Fustat (Old Cairo) on 19 June 1019 (12 Ṣafar 410 AH), known in Druze tradition as the "Day of al-Kāʾina", a name whose meaning is unknown. On that day, some of Hamza's followers entered the Mosque of Amr, loudly proclaiming their beliefs, but encountered the opposition of the locals, who began streaming to the mosque. When the Sunni chief judge (qāḍī al-quḍāt) learned of events, he went to the mosque, where Hamza's men tried to have him read out a statement affirming the divinity of al-Hakim. The qāḍī demurred, and the assembled multitude became incensed, so that they lynched Hamza's followers, dragging their corpses through the city's streets. On the same day, al-Hakim dismissed the police prefects of the capital, and punished the instigators of the lynchings. This only served to provoke the populace and the troops: on 29 June, the Turkish soldiers surrounded al-Darzi's house and, after a brief battle with his followers who had barricaded themselves there, stormed it. Some forty of al-Darzi's supporters were killed, but al-Darzi himself managed to escape and found refuge in the caliphal palace. The Turks then assembled before the palace gates, demanding that he be delivered to them for punishment; the historical sources are silent on al-Darzi's fate, but Hamza's epistles report that he was executed by al-Hakim.

Robbed of their original target, the Turkish troops turned on Hamza and his followers, attacking the Raydan Mosque and setting its gate on fire. Hamza himself reports in two of his epistles (10 and 19) how, with only twelve followers, of whom five were either too old or too young to fight, he managed to hold back the attacks of his enemies for a whole day, before a 'miraculous' appearance of al-Hakim forced their attackers to withdraw. Hamza places this miracle on the day of the Islamic new year (1 Muharram 410 AH/9 May 1019 CE), which thus marked the resumption of the Druze's missionary activity (the "divine call"). The riots spread, the discipline of the soldiers collapsed, and order was restored only after much of Cairo had been burned down. Chroniclers hostile to al-Hakim, like Yahya of Antioch or later Sunni historians, saw in this a deliberate attempt by the Caliph to punish the Cairenes for opposing the Druze teachings.

=== Final years ===
The ghulāt doctrines current during the later years of al-Hakim's reign were apparently propagated simultaneously and independently by a number of missionaries. Their roles and their mutual relationships are unclear. Al-Akhram for example is assigned a major role by later Sunni historians, but is passed over in silence by Hamza. Nevertheless, Hamza does appear to have played a leading role: even if al-Darzi had his own followers, the sources do suggest that he acknowledged Hamza's leadership on some matters. In any event, with the death of al-Darzi, by 1019 Hamza was the almost undisputed leader of the new movement.

More importantly, it was Hamza who built up the new religion into an organized movement similar to the official Isma'ili daʿwa, by appointing his own dāʿīs in Egypt and Syria. He furthermore selected some of his senior disciples and established them in a hierarchy of "ranks", headed by himself (see below).

=== Al-Hakim's disappearance and Hamza's death ===
On the night of 13 February 1021, Caliph al-Hakim disappeared during one of his usual nightly rides, likely the victim of a palace conspiracy. Power was seized by his sister, Sitt al-Mulk, as regent for al-Hakim's son, al-Zahir (r. 1021–1036). The new regime quickly reversed many of al-Hakim's controversial policies, instituting a return to Isma'ili orthodoxy. As part of this Isma'ili reaction, the Fatimid authorities launched a severe persecution against the Druze movement, with the result that the seven Islamic years that followed (411–418 AH) are a period of silence in the Druze sources.

A few months after al-Hakim's disappearance, Hamza wrote a farewell epistle (Risālat al-Ghayba, 'Epistle of Occultation'), in which he announced his retirement and al-Hakim's concealment or occultation (ghayba). In it, Hamza urged his followers to keep the faith, as the period of trials would soon pass, and the end times would arrive. (Note: Hamza ibn Ali's Risālat al-Ghayba ('Epistle of Occultation', written in 1021) is not to be confused with a treatise of the same name written in 1042 by his pupil Baha al-Din al-Muqtana (on which, see Kratschkowsky & Halm 1993, p. 544).)

According to the contemporary Baghdadi chronicler al-Khatib al-Baghdadi, Hamza fled the persecution to Mecca, where he was placed under the protection of the local ruler, the Sharif of Mecca. However, he was soon recognized by Egyptian Hajj pilgrims, who demanded his execution. The Sharif hesitated—according to Heinz Halm, likely waiting to see whether the new regime in Egypt would last—but after a series of supposed signs of divine displeasure, he had Hamza and one of his slaves beheaded in front of one of the gates of the Kaaba. The corpses were crucified, and stoned by passers-by; their remains were later burned.

=== Aftermath ===
The leadership of the Druze movement, now scattered and decimated, was taken over by one of Hamza's chief disciples, Baha al-Din al-Muqtana, who from 1027 tried to reconstitute the movement by sending his own epistles to the various Druze communities. Al-Muqtana remained the head of the Druze missionary movement until 1042, when he issued his own farewell epistle, announcing his retirement into concealment. In this final epistle, he again reiterated the imminent coming of the end times and the Last Judgment under al-Hakim, where truth would be made manifest, so that his own activity was no longer necessary. Until then, he ordered his followers to hide their true allegiance and even denounce him by name, if necessary to preserve their cover.

This marked the end of the Druze "divine call", i.e., its active missionary phase. From then to the present day, the Druze have been a closed community, in which neither conversion nor apostasy is allowed. The 71 epistles of al-Muqtana, together with those of Hamza and another disciple, Isma'il ibn Muhammad al-Tamimi, that al-Muqtana compiled, form the scripture of the Druze faith, the Epistles of Wisdom (Rasāʾil al-Ḥikma) or Exalted Wisdom (al-Ḥikma al-Sharīfa). Of its six books, the first two contain the work of Hamza and others, while the remaining four encompass al-Muqtana's writings. Thirty of the 113 Epistles of Wisdom (numbers 6 to 35) are attributed to Hamza.

== Teachings ==
The doctrine propagated by Hamza in his epistles reflects ideas current among Iranian Isma'ilis in the 10th century, particularly in the work of Abu Ya'qub al-Sijistani. Both Hamza and his assistant, Isma'il al-Tamimi, ascribed to and elaborated on neoplatonic ideas on the world soul and the universal intellect that had been absorbed by Isma'ili doctrine. Bryer terms the Druze a ghulāt sect of Isma'ilism, but stresses that the ideas espoused by Hamza "are but a logical if extreme development of Isma'ili ideas over the previous century and a half". According to Bryer, the core of Hamza's motivation was the divinity of al-Hakim, and an increasingly pronounced hatred to organized religion, as expressed in both the Isma'ili daʿwa and the traditional Sunni religious establishment. As a result, while the terminology and cosmology of his new religion betray their Isma'ili origins, his approach to Isma'ili tenets was highly eclectic: "Like some juggler, Hamza threw up the whole Isma'ili system into the air, catching and reshaping those aspects he liked, throwing out those he did not".

=== Cosmology ===
Early Isma'ilism regarded history as a sequence of cycles, each inaugurated by a prophetic figure like Noah or Muhammad, followed by seven imams and culminating in the appearance of a messiah (the Mahdī or al-Qāʾim) who would usher in a golden age or the last judgment. Hamza adapted this concept by asserting that in each historical cycle, God is made manifest by assuming corporeal form. As a result, during this cycle, the immediate presence of God meant that no revealed religion or law was necessary. In addition, God the Creator emanated a series of lower creations, from the Universal Intellect on downwards. As the Universal Intellect in its pride considered itself to be God, the Creator also juxtaposed an adversary (ḍidd) to it and to each of the lower creations. Like God, each of these pairs is incarnated in each historical cycle.

During the Biblical Creation, God was incarnated as al-Bar (from an Arabic or Persian word meaning "Creator" or "God"), while the Universal Intellect was incarnated as Adam, and its adversary as the Devil (named Harith ibn Murra). The Devil managed to seduce Adam, Eve, and their offspring, to rebel against al-Bar. God disappeared from the world, inaugurating a cycle of occultation (dawr al-satr). Since God was no longer manifest in the world, he instead sent prophets—Noah, Abraham, Moses, Jesus, and finally Muhammad—to create religious law (sharīʿa) in order to punish mankind. In a sharp break with both Sunni and Shi'a doctrine, Hamza considered Muhammad as the incarnation of the Devil, whereas the incarnation of the Universal Intellect at the time was Salman the Persian. All four Rashidun caliphs, including Ali, are likewise ranked among the adversaries. Hamza continued to accept the fundamental Isma'ili dogma that the sharīʿa had both an outer meaning (ẓāhir), corresponding to a literal interpretation of the Quranic revelation (tanzīl), as well as a hidden inner truth (bāṭin) accessible only to a few select initiates through allegorical (taʾwīl) interpretation.

=== Al-Hakim and the new religion ===
According to Hamza, the establishment of the Fatimid Caliphate inaugurated a new cycle, in which God secretly took human form (nāsūt) again, in the persons of the Fatimid imam–caliphs. Notably, Hamza does not count the first Fatimid caliph, al-Mahdi Billah (r. 909–934), among these incarnations, but starts only with his successor, al-Qa'im (r. 934–946); according to the historian Heinz Halm, this is probably an echo of the doubts about his legitimacy. This process culminated in the public proclamation of al-Hakim's divinity in 1017/18, the start of Hamza's mission. This event effectively closed the cycle begun by Muhammad, and Muhammad's revelation (the Quran) and law (the Sharia) were thus abrogated both in their outward and inner senses. Hamza denied the existence of both paradise and hell, and promised the imminence of the day when al-Hakim, sword in hand, would judge the world. On that day, all non-believers would be punished, and even the Muslims who did not accept the new creed would be reduced to the status of dhimmī; Hamza writes in detail about the distinctive dress and ornaments that would signify their inferior status.

Instead of the previous religious law, Hamza now preached a new "spiritual law" (al-sharīʿa al-rūḥāniyya) founded on seven moral principles. As the historian Daniel De Smet points out, these were simple injunctions "that had no esoteric dimension at all and were thus not subject to interpretation". The aim of the Druze movement was thus to restore the conditions prior to the fall of Adam; Hamza saw himself as a "new Adam", with the task of "wielding the sword of Our Lord" to achieve the return to the lost paradisiac conditions.

However, again the Devil and his minions interfered with the divine cause, taking the form of the leaders of the Fatimid daʿwa, who incited the people and the army against al-Hakim. Corresponding to his concept of pairs of emanations of God and their adversaries, Hamza established a hierarchy of five cosmic ranks (ḥudūd) corresponding to the emanations of the Creator-God (al-Hakim), and assigned to each of them a leading figure of the Fatimid establishment as their adversary: Hamza himself was the incarnation of the Universal Intellect, and opposed by al-Hakim's designated successor as caliph, Abd al-Rahim ibn Ilyas; next in line was Isma'il al-Tamimi, the incarnation of the World Soul, opposed by al-Hakim's designated successor as imam, al-Abbas ibn Shu'aib; then the Word, a certain Muhammad ibn Wahb al-Qurashi, opposed by the dāʿī al-duʿāt, Qut Tegin; then the Right Wing, Ali ibn Ahmad ibn al-Daif, opposed by the deputy dāʿī al-duʿāt, Ja'far al-Darir; and finally the Left Wing, Baha al-Din al-Muqtana (Hamza's eventual successor), opposed by the qāḍī al-quḍāt, Ahmad ibn Abi'l-Awamm. The continued opposition by the establishment would finally lead to God shedding his earthly vessel (al-Hakim) on the night of his disappearance.

== See also ==
- List of Druze

== Sources ==
- Abu-Izeddin, Nejla (1993) [1984]. The Druzes: A New Study of Their History, Faith, and Society (Second ed.). Leiden, New York, Köln: Brill. ISBN 90-04-09705-8.
- Bryer, David R. W. (1975). "The Origins of the Druze Religion". Der Islam. 52 (1): 47–84. doi:10.1515/islm.1975.52.1.47. ISSN 1613-0928. S2CID 201807131.
- Bryer, David R. W. (1975). "The Origins of the Druze Religion (Fortsetzung)". Der Islam. 52 (2): 239–262. doi:10.1515/islm.1975.52.2.239. ISSN 1613-0928. S2CID 162363556.
- Bryer, David R. W. (1976). "The Origins of the Druze Religion". Der Islam. 53 (1): 5–27. doi:10.1515/islm.1976.53.1.5. ISSN 1613-0928. S2CID 162266101.
- Daftary, Farhad (2007). The Ismāʿı̄lı̄s: Their History and Doctrines (Second ed.). Cambridge: Cambridge University Press. ISBN 978-0-521-61636-2.
- De Smet, Daniel (2017). "Ḥamza b. ʿAlī". In Fleet, Kate; Krämer, Gudrun; Matringe, Denis; Nawas, John; Rowson, Everett (eds.). Encyclopaedia of Islam (3rd ed.). Brill Online. ISSN 1873-9830.
- Halm, Heinz (2003). Die Kalifen von Kairo: Die Fāṭimiden in Ägypten, 973–1074 [The Caliphs of Cairo: The Fatimids in Egypt, 973–1074] (in German). Munich: C. H. Beck. ISBN 3-406-48654-1.
- Kratschkowsky, I. & Halm, Heinz (1993). "al-Muḳtanā". In Bosworth, C. E.; van Donzel, E.; Heinrichs, W. P. & Pellat, Ch. (eds.). The Encyclopaedia of Islam, Second Edition. Volume VII: Mif–Naz. Leiden: E. J. Brill. p. 544. ISBN 978-90-04-09419-2.
- Madelung, Wilferd (1971). "Ḥamza b. ʿAlī". In Lewis, B.; Ménage, V. L.; Pellat, Ch. & Schacht, J. (eds.). The Encyclopaedia of Islam, Second Edition. Volume III: H–Iram. Leiden: E. J. Brill. p. 154. OCLC 495469525.
- Makarim, Sami Nasib (1974). The Druze Faith. Caravan Books. ISBN 978-0-88206-003-3.
