= Aqil Agha =

Strongman in Palestine

Aqil Agha al-Hasi Agha
- عقيل آغا الحاسي
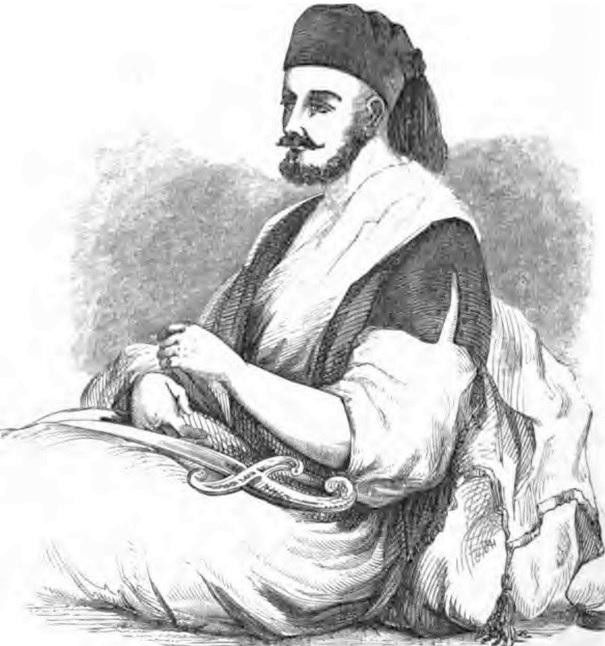
- Sketch of Aqil Agha in 1848 by William F. Lynch
- Born: Ca. 1820 (year unknown); Gaza or Nazareth area, Sidon Eyalet, Ottoman Empire
- Died: 1870; Shefa-Amr area, Beirut Vilayet, Ottoman Empire
- Burial place: I'billin, Beirut Vilayet, Ottoman Empire
- Relatives: Musa Agha al-Hasi (father); Salih Agha al-Hasi (brother); Ali al-Hasi (brother); Quwaytin Agha al-Aqili (son)
- Military career
- Allegiance: Ottoman Empire
- Service years: 1840–1844; 1847–1852; 1855–1863; 1866–1870
- Rank: Captain of Bashi-bazouk
- Unit: Hawwara/Hanadi Irregulars
- Conflicts: Peasants' revolt in Palestine (1834); Hauran Rebellion (1852); Battle of Hattin (1857)

Aqil Agha al-Hasi (Arabic: عقيل آغا الحاسي, given name also spelled Aqil, Aqila, Akil or Akili; military title sometimes spelled Aga) (died 1870) was the strongman of northern Palestine in the mid-19th century, during Ottoman rule. He was originally a commander of Arab irregular soldiers, known as the Hawwara tribe, in the service of the Ottoman governors of Acre. His influence in the Galilee grew as he strengthened his alliances with the powerful Beni Sakhr and Anizzah tribes of Transjordan, and recruited unemployed Bedouin irregulars from Egypt into his own band of irregulars, who thenceforth became known as the Hanadi tribe. He was known by his men and Western travelers to be courageous, cunning and charismatic, all qualities that contributed to his rise as the de facto ruler of northern Palestine.

Throughout his rule, Aqil remained at least nominally in service to the Ottoman Empire, which paid him for protecting the roads of northern Palestine from Bedouin raids and for maintaining the security of this region. He also exacted his own tolls on the local population in return for ensuring their security. His friendly ties with the European governments were partially due to his protection of the local Christian and Jewish communities in the Galilee, including his protection of Nazareth from the 1860 massacres that occurred in Ottoman Syria. Aqil's relationship with the authorities was generally tense and he rebelled directly or indirectly against their local representatives. As a consequence of this frayed relationship, Aqil's employment would frequently be terminated when his activities or influence perturbed the authorities and then reinstated when his services were needed. By the time of his death, his influence had declined significantly. He was buried in his Galilee stronghold of I'billin.

While Palestine had been under Ottoman rule from the early 16th century, direct imperial administrative rule was challenged by a series of local leaders who exhibited vast influence over local affairs between the 17th and 19th centuries. With the Empire embroiled in the Crimean War, the power vacuum created in the area in the wake of Daher al-Umar's rule in the Galilee (1730–1775), Ahmad Pasha al-Jazzar's rule (1776–1804), and Muhammad Ali's rule (1831–1840), was filled by Aqil. Aqil's demise represented the end of the last local obstacle to Ottoman centralization in Palestine.

== Early life and family ==
Besides anecdotes provided in the writings of European consuls, most of the information on Aqil's life indirectly traces back to a history of the man written by Mikha'il Qa'war, a Nazareth clergyman. Aqil was born into a Bedouin family, known later as the Hanadi tribe. The actual Hanadi were an unrelated tribe that came to Palestine from Egypt during Egyptian rule in Palestine (1831–1840) and around 1840 joined Aqil's Hawwara tribesmen, who also had migrated from Egypt. The name "Hanadi" translates in Arabic as "Indians" and the Hanadi irregulars were referred to as such by the inhabitants of Palestine because of their dark skin.

Aqil's Hawwara tribesmen in the Galilee were not related to the well-known Hawwara tribe of Upper Egypt, who were noted for their "bravery, horsemanship, and equipments" according to the Palestine Exploration Fund. The Hawwara of the Galilee were actually from the Ainawiyeh tribe of the Lower Egyptian desert region who had entered the service of Ahmad Pasha al-Jazzar while the latter was based in Egypt in the late 18th century. They came with al-Jazzar to northern Palestine when al-Jazzar became the powerful Acre-based Ottoman governor of Sidon after the death of the Arab strongman of the Galilee, Daher al-Umar, in 1776. Al-Jazzar honored the Ainawiyeh tribesmen by giving them the name "Hawwara" to associate them with the famed Hawwara of Upper Egypt.

Aqil's father, Musa Agha al-Hasi, himself a commander of Hawwara irregulars in the service of Acre's Ottoman governors, had left Egypt for Gaza in 1814. He was not directly related to the Ainawiyeh or Hawwara tribes, but claimed descent from the Hawwara as a matter of convenience and prestige. Musa originally hailed from the al-Bara'asa tribe of Cyrenaica (modern-day eastern Libya). Likewise, James Finn, the British consul in Jerusalem (1846–1863), claims Aqil's family was of Algerian or North African origin. Musa Agha resided in the Galilee around 1820 and married a Turkmen woman. Aqil was born to the couple in the Nazareth area. According to historian Adel Manna, Aqil was born in Gaza. Musa had two other sons, Ali and Salih. Musa died in Gaza in 1830.

Aqil's power base consisted of his tribesmen and alliances with other Bedouin tribes, who inhabited both sides of the Jordan River. Aqil's brother, Salih Agha, held substantial influence in the Haifa region. Mary Rogers, the sister of the English vice consul, described in detail a banquet in Shefa-Amr and a gazelle hunt at the invitation of Salih Agha, while another traveler witnessed the lavish wedding between a son of Salih Agha and a daughter of Aqil Agha on "the plains of I'billin", in circa 1857. Aqil married off another of his daughters to a Bedouin sheikh (chieftain) in Gaza, paying the highest dowry registered at the time in Gaza: 11,000 piasters. The governor of Hebron was reported to be a brother-in-law of Aqil.

== Strongman of the Galilee ==
=== Consolidation of influence ===
Like his father before him, Aqil served various masters, among whom was Ibrahim Pasha, the son of Muhammad Ali of Egypt. Aqil defected from Ibrahim Pasha's army and joined local rebels in the 1834 peasants' revolt against Egyptian conscription and disarmament measures, leading his Hawwara irregulars in the Galilee. At some point during the revolt, Aqil helped save the mostly Druze village of Isfiya from being destroyed by Ibrahim Pasha's troops after its inhabitants paid Aqil for protection. As the revolt was suppressed, Aqil and his men left Palestine for Transjordan, where they sought the protection of that region's major Bedouin tribes. During his time in Transjordan he strengthened relations with these tribes. When the Ottomans regained control of Palestine in 1840–1841, Aqil returned to the Lower Galilee and was commissioned as a captain of ten mounted irregulars. He recruited Egyptian irregulars from the Hanadi tribe and others who were left unemployed following the Egyptian withdrawal. Together with Aqil's Hawwara, they became a formidable local force. In 1843, Aqil became the chief of irregulars, known as bashi-bazouk, in northern Palestine, and his command was expanded to fifty horsemen. Aqil's irregulars became known in the area as the Hanadi, although the group's tribal composition was mixed.

Aqil angered the kaimakam (district governor) of Acre, Muhammad Kubrisi, for his intervention in a dispute between two factions of the Catholic Church in Nazareth. One of the leaders of the Catholic factions, Sheikh Yusef Elias, had been dismissed by the church and subsequently entered Aqil's protection. He requested Aqil's intercession with Kubrisi, which was unsuccessful. When Sheikh Yusef decided to take matters into his own hands by raising a group of armed partisans in Nazareth, the church was compelled to restore his employment. Kubrisi believed Aqil had backed Sheikh Yusef's actions and accused Aqil of sedition. Kubrisi recalled Aqil and his Hawwara irregulars to Acre, verbally lambasted them and dismissed them all from service. Aqil was deeply insulted by Kubrisi's words and actions, and subsequently left for Transjordan where he sought the protection of Emir Fendi Al-Fayez of the Beni Sakhr tribe.

Aqil secured a durable alliance with the Beni Sakhr, consecrated through his marriage to a woman from the tribe. From Transjordan, he and his band of irregulars raided areas on both sides of the Jordan River until he was invited back to the Galilee by Acre's kaimakam in 1847. The latter had sought to neutralize Aqil and his allies' marauding activities, and thus pardoned Aqil. He was also given command of 75 bashi-bazouk in the Lower Galilee. Thereafter, he was commissioned with overseeing that region's security. In particular, the successive governors of Acre entrusted him with protecting the Galilee's trade routes and maintaining general security in the area, which he did successfully. With time, he became an unofficial mutasallim (tax collector) for much of northern Palestine, including the Jezreel Valley, Safad, Tiberias and Nazareth. The tax he collected was not on behalf of the authorities, but rather a tribute payment (khuwwa) to receive his protection. While this unofficial system proved successful in guaranteeing local security, later historians criticized it as akin to a protection racket.

=== Encounter with William F. Lynch ===
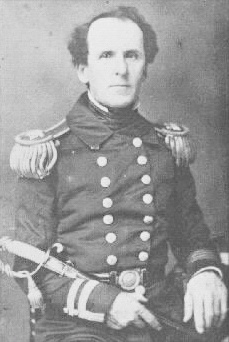
William F. Lynch

In 1848, Aqil assisted an expedition headed by US Navy captain William Francis Lynch to the Dead Sea, and became known in the United States and Europe through the publication of Lynch's book that year. Vivid descriptions of Aqil by Lynch are quoted at length in the works of Finn. Lynch's first encounter with Aqil was in the divan of Said Bey, the Ottoman kaimakam of Acre, and is recorded as follows:

But what especially attracted my attention was a magnificent savage enveloped in a scarlet cloth pelisse richly embroidered with gold. He was the handsomest, and I soon thought also the most graceful being I had ever seen. His complexion was of a rich mellow indescribable olive tint, and his hair a glossy black; his teeth were regular and of the whitest ivory, and the glance of his eye was keen at times, but generally soft and lustrous. With the tarboosh upon his head which he seemed to wear uneasily, he reclined, rather than sat upon the opposite side of the divân, while his hand played in unconscious familiarity with the hilt of his yataghan. He looked like one who would be 'Steel amid the din of arms, and wax when with the fair.'

In this meeting, Said Bey had attempted to dissuade Lynch of his plans to travel to the Dead Sea, with Aqil remarking that the Bedouin of the Ghor (Jordan Valley) would "eat them up". Lynch's reply was that "they would find us difficult of digestion," but he suggested that as Aqil seemed to hold influence with these tribes, he would be prepared to pay him to make the trip a more peaceable one.

After the meeting ended, Lynch pursued Aqil to speak with him alone. He showed him his sword and revolver, which Aqil examined and declared to be the "Devil's invention". Lynch described the weaponry at the disposal of his men and asked Aqil if he thought it sufficient to make the journey to the Jordan, and Aqil replied that, "You will, if anyone can." Lynch later secured Aqil's accompaniment on the trip to the Dead Sea, through the intervention of an ex-Sharif of Mecca, describing the latter as "our counsellor, sagacious and prudent," and Aqil as, "the bold warrior and the admirable scout." Aqil and his Beni Sakhr allies quashed a party of Adwan Bedouin tribesmen when they attempted to rob Lynch's party. Lynch's record of Aqil's feat made him well known in Europe.

=== Hauran rebellion, imprisonment and escape ===
Aqil's irregulars attracted the membership of local individuals and small clans. Along with his alliance with the two powerful tribes of the region, the Beni Sakhr and the Anizzah, Aqil's autonomy in the Galilee was further strengthened, although he was nominally subordinate to the Ottoman authorities. He based himself in the Zaydani fortress of I'billin, a mixed Muslim-Christian village between Acre and Nazareth that was previously fortified by the family of Daher al-Umar. By 1852, Aqil ceased residing in I'billin, preferring the traditional Bedouin lifestyle, dwelling in encampments and among his livestock. At this point, he ruled the area between Shefa-Amr to Beisan. He and his Hanadi tribesmen characteristically dressed in brown-striped robes.

In 1852, he was commissioned by the Ottoman authorities to prevent the spread of a Druze rebellion from Hauran to northern Palestine. He successfully satisfied this request, aided by his Bedouin allies. Among his assignments during the rebellion was the protection from Bedouin raiders of a supply route which the Ottomans used to send ammunition to their troops in Hauran. Aqil and his men accomplished the task successfully.

Despite his successes during the Druze revolt, the authorities, with whom he always had a tense relationship, grew wary of his strength and subsequently arrested him in a nighttime raid. He was sent to Istanbul by sea and from there he was sent to serve a prison sentence at the Widin fortress on the Danube River. Aqil was apparently loaned some money from the Latin Patriarch of Jerusalem, who had accompanied him on the ship ride to Istanbul, and Aqil used those funds to purchase a fake passport. With the passport and a disguise, he and an Albanian inmate named Hasan Agha escaped Widin in 1854 and reached Salonica. From there, Aqil departed to Anatolia and then Aleppo. Aqil resumed his Bedouin lifestyle of raiding and nomadic dwelling.

=== Reinstatement and Battle of Hattin ===
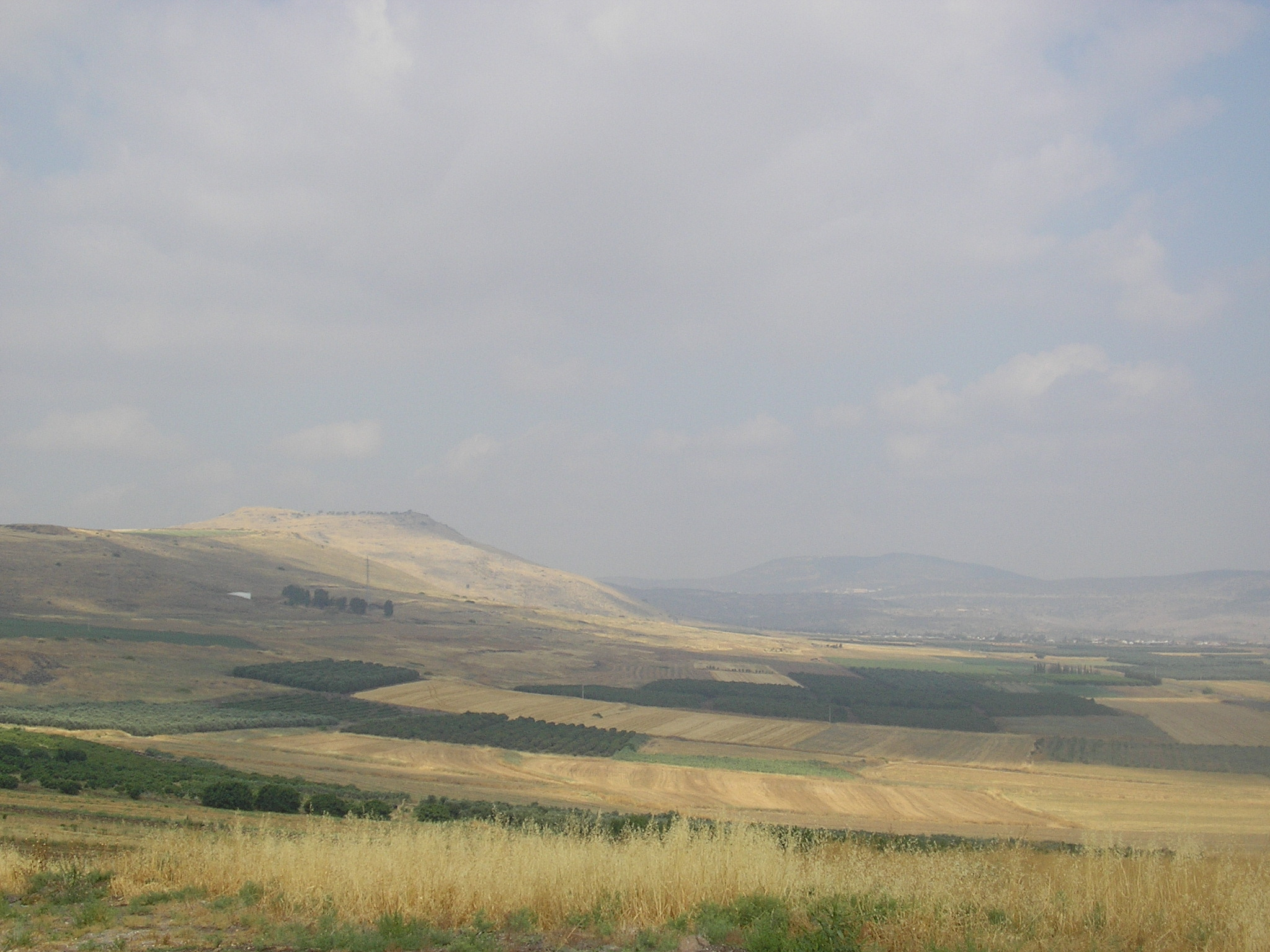
The Horns of Hattin where Aqil and his men decisively defeated a Kurdish force seeking to oust him from the Galilee in 1857

At the time of Aqil's escape, the Ottomans were engaged in the Crimean War with the Russian Empire, which left a domestic security void in its provinces due to the large number of provincial troops deployed to Crimea. To restore security in the Galilee, Aqil was reassigned to his powerful post in the region in 1855. On his return to Palestine, Aqil's Hanadi tribesmen abandoned their conscription orders to serve with the Ottoman Army in the Crimean War and instead returned to Aqil's service. Aqil was once again charged with protecting the routes of rural Palestine and occasionally Transjordan. He was once commissioned to collect taxes from Karak.

In Aqil's absence, a garrison of Kurdish irregulars based in Damascus had been left in charge of security in the Galilee. They were commanded by Shamdin Agha, but their employment was terminated by Aqil in 1855. Meanwhile, scores of Bedouin tribesmen from Faiyum with kinship ties to Aqil's tribal irregulars had migrated to the Levant as a result of their suppression by Sa'id Pasha of Egypt. Aqil welcomed their membership into his tribal band and their numbers subsequently swelled. He consecrated his relationship with the new arrivals by marrying a daughter of one of their sheikhs. In May 1856, he defeated the Abd al-Hadi clan of Arraba in a major clash that ended encroachments by the Abd al-Hadis on Aqil's territory.

In 1857, the Beirut-based governor of Sidon Eyalet agreed to Shamdin's request to eliminate Aqil, who, to the consternation of the Ottoman authorities, was ruling the Galilee autonomously by that time. Shamdin, who sought vengeance against Aqil for terminating his service in the Galilee, had complained to the Sidon governor that Aqil was committing treachery by collaborating with the Bedouin tribes against Ottoman authority. The Ottomans, whose dependence on Aqil had decreased with the end of the Crimean War in 1856, found in Shamdin's request a convenient way to end Aqil's growing autonomy. When Aqil visited Beirut to pay his respects to the governor of Sidon, he traveled with "the air of a sultan", according to the American missionary Henry H. Jessup, bringing with him a large and heavily armed Bedouin entourage.

Shamdin's forces, amounting to 600–700 Kurdish irregulars, massed in Tiberias. They were commanded by Shamdin's sons Muhammad Sa'id and Hasan Agha. Curious at this deployment, Aqil had requested an explanation from the kaimakam of Acre, but received no response. Thus Aqil concluded that the deployment was part of a conspiracy to upend his rule. In response, Aqil assembled his entire force of irregulars, amounting to some 300–400 men, and marched towards Shamdin's troops. Other Arab tribes volunteered their service, but Aqil declined their participation.

On 30 March, the Kurdish irregulars confronted Aqil's irregulars and Bedouin allies at the Horns of Hattin, near the village of Hattin. For the most part, both sides were armed with swords and spears and to a lesser extent, rifles, rather than the modern weaponry at the Ottoman military's disposal. Initially, the battle was going in Shamdin's favor and a portion of Aqil's troops began to flee. However, Salih Agha, Aqil's brother, led his group in a surprise attack against the Kurds. As a result, Shamdin's forces were dealt a decisive blow and commander Hasan Agha was among the 150 fatalities of that battle.

Aqil's victory entrenched his rule over the Galilee and afterward he established stronger relations with the Europeans. After Aqil's victory at Hattin, the Ottoman authorities distanced themselves from the incident in their correspondence with Aqil, but he accepted their explanations with a grain of salt. In September 1858, Aqil was residing in Nazareth and decided not to intervene and put a stop to tribal clashes in the Jezreel Valley.

=== 1860 events and protection of Christians ===
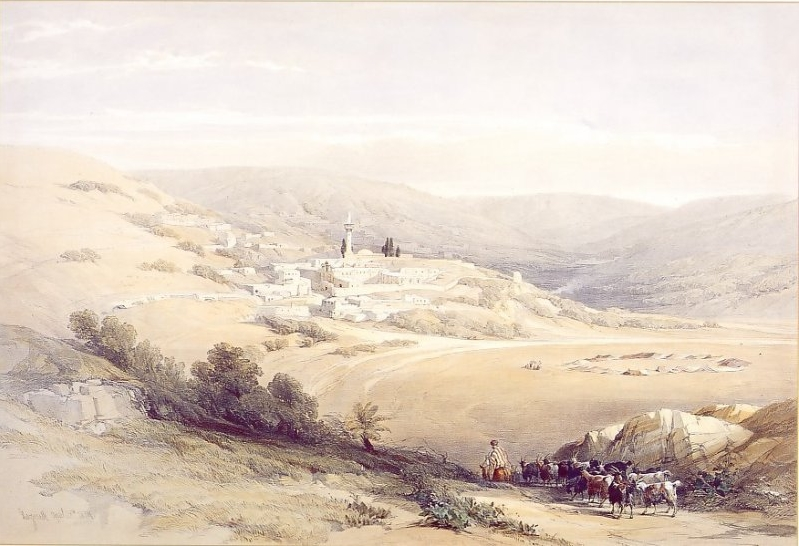
Drawing of Nazareth, 1839 by David Roberts, published in The Holy Land, Syria, Idumea, Arabia, Egypt, and Nubia. Aqil was honored by various European governments for protecting the Christians of Nazareth from the 1860 massacres

Aqil had been previously courted by European powers to secure protection for their Christian and Jewish protégés. During the 1860 Mount Lebanon civil war, anti-Christian animosity spread to Damascus where Christians were massacred by Druze and Muslim mobs. It appeared that the violence would spread to Acre as well, but Aqil issued direct orders to Acre's Muslim residents not to bring harm to the city's Christians, stating he would "chastise ... with his sword" anyone who violated the orders. Aqil also protected the Christian community of Nazareth from harm as their coreligionists elsewhere in Ottoman Syria faced massacres. Part of this protection included warnings to local Bedouin tribes to refrain from assaulting the town and warnings to its Christian and Muslim residents to prepare themselves militarily in case of attack. Aqil maintained a close friendship with Tannous Qawwar, a prominent Greek Orthodox resident of the town.

In gratitude for protecting the Christians in Nazareth and Acre, Napoleon III of France presented Aqil a gun and the Legion of Honor medal in April 1861 aboard his French vessel docked at Haifa Bay. Edward, Prince of Wales (later King of the United Kingdom) personally visited Aqil two years later to show his appreciation. Aqil offered Edward four Arabian horses, but Edward politely declined. As a token of his appreciation, Edward gave Aqil a revolver.

His protection of the local Christians and his reputed Algerian origins drew comparisons with Abd al-Qader al-Jaza'iri, the exiled Algerian rebel who saved many Christians from harm during the 1860 riots in Damascus, and with whom Aqil developed ties. Aqil realized that European protection would strengthen his position towards the Ottoman rulers. After 1860, he courted the French, once sending a tiger as a present to "his Emperor" through the French consul in Beirut. According to Finn, Aqil was under special "French consideration".

=== Decline of influence ===
The Ottoman imperial government adopted its Tanzimat modernization reforms in 1862 and originally entrusted Aqil with enforcing the new law of the land in northern Palestine. Part of these measures were stronger efforts to suppress the Bedouin tribes and decisively end their raiding activities. Aqil was given orders to prevent them from setting up camps in the cultivated lands of the Galilee and forbade the collection of khuwwa tolls from the local inhabitants. Aqil resigned from his post when he was informed that as part of his new assignment he and his men were required to don Ottoman uniforms. He objected to the requirement, insisting that as Bedouin, they were not accustomed to wearing uniforms. He was replaced by one of his Hawwara tribesmen, but Aqil compelled his successor to resign as well. Shortly after his resignation, the requirement of uniforms was canceled and Aqil resumed his assignment.

Aqil's closeness with the Europeans disturbed the Ottomans. His relations with the kaimakam of Acre, who in 1863 was Hasan Effendi, were also deteriorating. Since his return to Palestine in 1854, he avoided setting foot in the city, instead assigning a resident representative who engaged the kaimakam on his behalf. Hasan Effendi lodged complaints to the provincial governor in Beirut, Kapuli Pasha, about the misconduct of Aqil's men who extorted the local peasantry. Indeed, Aqil's protection was generally limited to those who could pay for his services or otherwise benefit his interests, including merchants, travelers, monks, pilgrims, Christians and Jews.

The Tanzimat proved unpopular with large segments of the population and a Bedouin revolt broke out, with Transjordanian tribes launching raids against Tiberias and its countryside in the summer of 1863. Aqil was unable to stop the raids, and may have played a role in the revolt. In response, the Ottomans dispatched a 2,000-strong, artillery-backed force from Damascus and Acre to Tiberias. The presence of artillery caused the Transjordanian tribes to retreat. Aqil viewed this deployment as an attack on his jurisdiction and issued his resignation in protest, all the while hoping Kapuli Pasha would back down and reject his resignation. To that end, he had Jewish notables from Tiberias and the French consul of Beirut lobby on his behalf, but without success, as Kapuli Pasha, content to see the elimination of a local power such as Aqil, accepted his resignation.

After resigning, Aqil left the Galilee for Tell el-Hesi in the region of Gaza. Around this time, Aqil married off a daughter of his to the leading Bedouin sheikh of the area, Rabbah al-Wahaidi. Bedouin raiding, now with the participation of the smaller tribes of the Galilee, resumed not long after Aqil's resignation and concerns by the local merchants and European consuls were voiced to Kapuli Pasha due to the incoming harvest season for cotton and grain from the Galilee and Hauran. Hasan Effendi sought to stem the tide of looting by attempting to play one Bedouin tribe off of the other. Kapuli Pasha was doubtful of this policy's effectiveness and strove to use military force instead. He personally led a contingent of troops in the Galilee and ensured a peaceful harvest through the end of 1863. However, Kapuli Pasha determined that he could not keep a large, permanent military contingent in the Galilee and decided to reinstate Aqil to his former position after lobbying from the British consul of Haifa.

Kapuli Pasha's successor, Kurshid Pasha, resumed the anti-Bedouin operations in the Galilee in 1864 and sought to establish in the eastern Galilee four heavily armed forts as a bulwark against further raiding. Aqil entered into a conflict with the governor of Nablus and member of the Abd al-Hadi family, who tried to arrest Aqil. Kurshid Pasha dismissed Aqil by the end of the year. Fearing his arrest or death in light of the Ottomans' subsequent deployment of 200 Kurdish irregulars to Tiberias and the presence of military forces from Acre and Beirut in the western Galilee, Aqil fled to Salt in the Balqa area of Transjordan.

Aqil later moved to Egypt. Abd al-Qadir al-Jaza'iri and Isma'il Pasha lobbied the Ottoman government on Aqil's behalf and he was given permission to return to the Galilee in 1866. He subsequently inhabited the area of Mount Tabor. Despite his return and the reinstatement of a government salary, he was not able to restore his semi-autonomous authority in the region. In late 1869 he was awarded a medal of honor from the Habsburg dynasty of the Austro-Hungarian Empire.

== Death and legacy ==
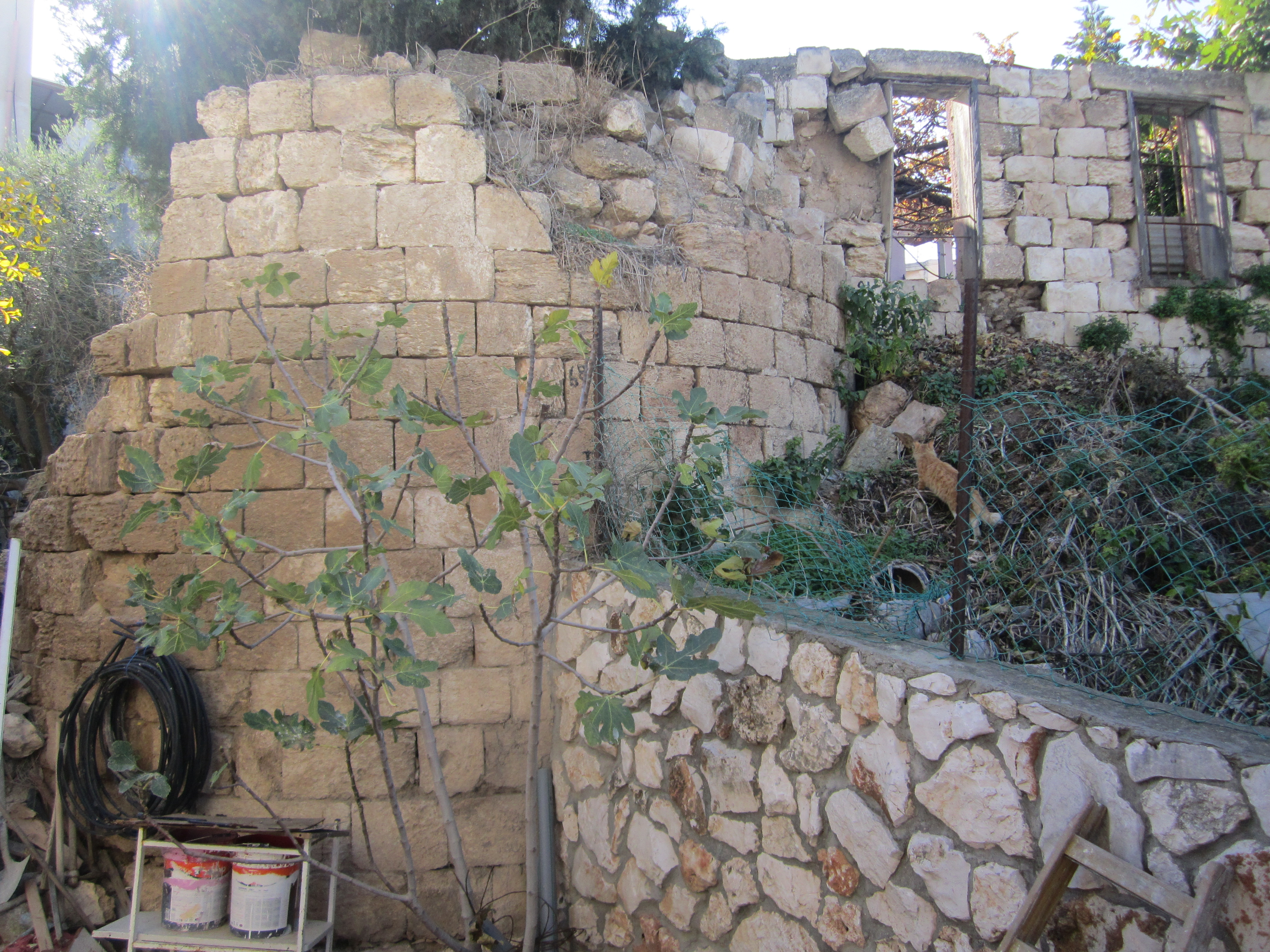
Remains of the Zaydani fortress in I'billin. Aqil temporarily lived in I'billin, and the village served as his rural headquarters. He was buried there in 1870.

Aqil died in 1870, although his death was erroneously recorded by R. A. Stewart Macalister to have occurred in 1867. According to Macalister, Aqil died in the vicinity of Shefa-Amr. He was buried in I'billin, his previous Galilee headquarters. As of the early 1980s, descendants of Aqil still inhabited I'billin.

Aqil's son Quwaytin succeeded him as the chief of the Hanadi tribesmen who continued to inhabit the Galilee and its vicinity. In the late 19th century, Quwaytin's tribe had some 900 members and was based in the northern Jordan Valley. Quwaytin donned the honor cross medallions given to his father by various European governments. However, Hanadi influence and strength in the region diminished under Quwaytin and was gradually suppressed by various Ottoman actors, eventually reducing the Hanadi to an ineffectual tribe. Quwaytin's son and successor Rida also entered into Ottoman service and held the title of agha like Aqil. In the early 20th century, Rida Agha held the equivalent rank of a lieutenant and served as commander of police in the Balqa Sanjak in Transjordan.

For nearly two decades Aqil had been a major local power in northern Palestine. He asserted to other tribal sheikhs that the land they roamed in belonged to the Arabs and that one day they would take it back from the Turkish Ottoman "conquerors". According to Finn, Aqil may have ultimately envisioned forming an Arab confederation in the southern Levant independent of the Ottomans and backed by France. However, despite these perceived intentions, Aqil ruled under the auspices of the Ottoman authorities, was paid by them, and was at least partially dependent upon their support. His ties with France and Europe contributed to his power, but he lacked the necessary support from these countries to pursue any desire of independence that he had. Aqil's death marked the removal of "the last obstacle to the implementation of full centralized Ottoman rule" in northern Palestine, according to historian Mahmoud Yazbak. When full Ottoman centralization in the Galilee was realized, local powers permanently lost their influence over the region's development. That power was instead passed on to wealthy businessmen from Haifa and Beirut, ultimately leaving the Sursock family of Beirut as the new "masters" of the Galilee, according to anthropologist Alexander Schölch; within another half a century, the area was sold to Zionist colonists in the Sursock Purchase.

One of the factors Schölch attributes to Aqil's failure to secure an autonomous rule similar to that of the Arab sheikh Daher al-Umar was Aqil's refusal to accept a sedentary life. While I'billin frequently functioned as a headquarters of sorts for Aqil, he did not take up permanent residence there, or anywhere. Instead it served as a symbol of his authority in the Galilee. Aqil was adamantly a Bedouin and once remarked to William Lynch that it would be a "disgrace" to "till the ground like a fellah". The nomadic, marauding lifestyle of Aqil ran counter to the modernization efforts of the Ottomans, which strongly encouraged settlement of the land and centralization. These processes were eventually embraced by the peasantry and the urban notables, but resisted by the Bedouin tribes whose traditional livelihoods were at risk.

Schölch asserts that Aqil contributed little to the socio-economic development of Palestine, and was not a "benefactor of the peasants". However, Aqil is described in a mostly positive light by modern-day sources and in local tradition. In the Arab nationalist political atmosphere that followed the Ottoman Empire's fall in 1917, Aqil's Arab identity and his struggles against the Ottomans contributed to the prevailing positive commemoration of his life. Palestinian Christians in particular remember him fondly for protecting Christians during his rule.

== Bibliography ==
- Abujaber, Raouf Sa'd (1989). Pioneers Over Jordan: The Frontier Settlement in Transjordan, 1850–1914. I.B. Tauris. ISBN 978-1-85043-116-9.
- Van Der Steen, Eveline (1989). Near Eastern Tribal Societies During the Nineteenth Century: Economy, Society and Politics Between Tent and Town. Routledge. ISBN 978-1-317-54347-3.
- Farley, James Lewis (1858). Two years in Syria. Saunders and Otley.
- Finn, James (1877). Byeways in Palestine. London: James Nisbet.(p.79, ff)
- Finn, James (1878). Elizabeth A. Finn (ed.). Stirring Times, or, Records from Jerusalem Consular Chronicles of 1853 to 1856. Edited and Compiled by His Widow E. A. Finn. With a Preface by the Viscountess Strangford. Vol. 1. London: C.K. Paul & co.(p.414-p.432)
- Jessup, Henry Harris (1910). Fifty-three Years in Syria. Vol. 1. Fleming H. Revell Company.
- Lynch, William F. (1849). Narrative of the United States' Expedition to the River Jordan and the Dead Sea. London: Richard Bentley.
- Macalister, R. A. Stewart; Masterman, E. W. G. (1906). "Occasional Papers on the Modern inhabitants of Palestine, part V". Quarterly Statement - Palestine Exploration Fund. 38 (3): 221–225, 286–291. doi:10.1179/peq.1906.38.3.221.
- Manna, Adel (2005). "Aqila Agha al-Hasi". In Philip Mattar (ed.). Encyclopedia of the Palestinians, Revised Edition. New York: Facts on File. pp. 199–200. ISBN 9780816069866.
- Mansour, Atallah (2004). Narrow Gate Churches: The Christian Presence in the Holy Land Under Muslim and Jewish rule. Pasadena: Hope Publishing House. ISBN 1-932717-02-1.
- Rogers, Mary Eliza (1865). Domestic life in Palestine. Cincinnati: Poe & Hitchcock.
- Saulcy, Louis Félicien de (1853). Narrative of a journey round the Dead Sea, and in the Bible lands, in 1850 and 1851. Vol. 1. London: R. Bentley.
- Schumacher, Gottlieb (1889). Abila of the Decapolis. Society's office.
- Schölch, A. (1984). "The Decline of Local Power in Palestine after 1856: The Case of ʿAqīl Aġā". Die Welt des Islams. New Series. 23 (1/4). BRILL: 458–475. doi:10.2307/1570684. JSTOR 1570684.
- Schölch, A. (1993). Palestine in Transformation, 1856–1882: Studies in Social, Economic, and Political Development (PDF). Institute for Palestine Studies. ISBN 0-88728-234-2.
- Thomson, William McClure (1859). The Land and the Book: Or, Biblical Illustrations Drawn from the Manners and Customs, the Scenes and Scenery, of the Holy Land. Vol. 1 (1 ed.). New York: Harper & brothers.
- Tristram, H.B. (1865). Land of Israel, A Journal of travel in Palestine, undertaken with special reference to its physical character. London: Society for Promoting Christian Knowledge. (pp. 120, 419, 420, 449, 452, 498)
- Yazbak, Mahmoud (1998). Haifa in the Late Ottoman Period, A Muslim Town in Transition, 1864–1914. Brill Academic Pub. ISBN 90-04-11051-8.
- Zenner, Walter P. (1972). "Aqiili Agha: The Strongman in the Ethnic Relations of the Ottoman Galilee". Comparative Studies in Society and History. 14 (2): 169–188. doi:10.1017/S0010417500006599. S2CID 143550599.
