= I'billin =

Local council in Northern Israel

I'billin: אעבלין; إعبلين
- Local council

Hebrew transcription(s)
  - ISO 259: ʔiˁblin
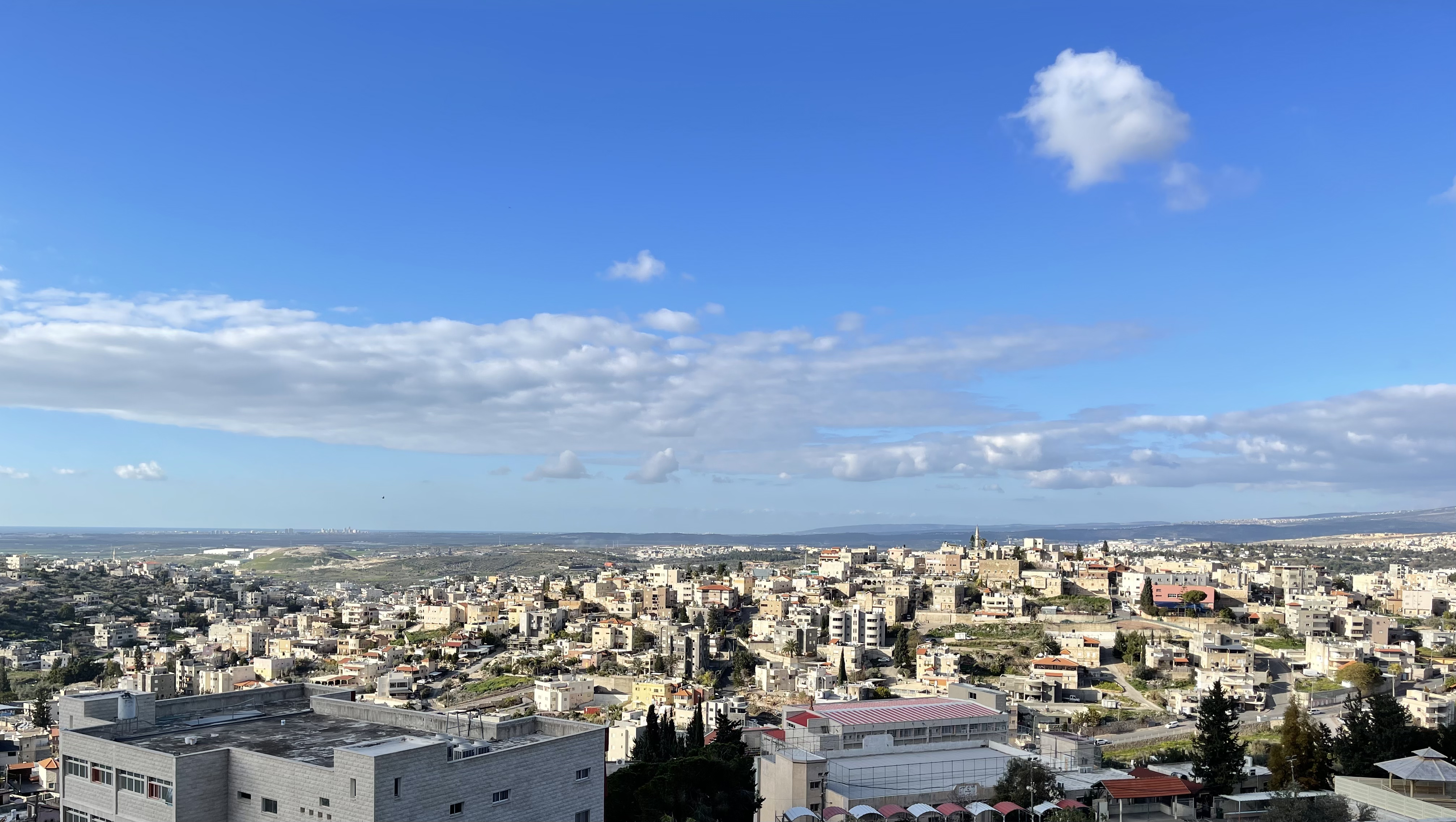

- Location within Northwest Israel Location within Israel
- Coordinates: 32°49′21″N 35°11′32″E
- Grid position: 168/247 PAL
- Country: Israel
- District: Northern
- Subdistrict: Acre
- Natural Region: Shefar'am

Area
  - Total: 18,000 dunams (18 km^{2}; 6.9 sq mi)

Population (2024)
  - Total: 13,634
  - Density: 760/km^{2} (2,000/sq mi)

I'billin (Arabic: إعبلين, Hebrew: אִעְבְּלִין) is a local council in the Northern District of Israel, near Shefa-'Amr. I'billin was granted municipal status in 1960. The municipality's area is 18,000 dunams. In 2024 its population was 13,634, all of whom are Arab Israelis with a mixed population of Muslims and Christians. In 2022, 58.2% of the population was Muslim and 41.8% was Christian.

== History ==
Archaeological excavations in the centre of the village has indicated a continuous inhabitation from the 9th century BCE during the Iron Age, to the 14th century CE during the Mamluk period.

=== Roman Empire ===
Archaeological evidence indicates that this was a Jewish settlement in ancient times, and findings include ritual baths and hiding complexes used during the First Jewish–Roman War. I'billin has been identified with the Jewish town of Evlayim or Abelim, which is attested in various Talmudic sources from the third century CE.

A synagogue lintel dating between the 4th and 6th century CE was found in I'billin. It was repurposed as a step on the street leading to the village church and bears a text that translates as, "Remembered for the good is Baruch the Alexandrian(?) or son of Nehorai(?) who here supported (contributed) and made this gate. Amen. Peace."

=== Fatimid Caliphate ===
Nasir Khusraw visited the place in 1047 CE: "From Damum we passed south to another village, called A'bilin, where there is the tomb of Hud - peace be upon him! - which I visited. Within the enclosure here is a mulberry tree, and there is likewise the tomb of the prophet Uzair - peace be upon him! - which I also visited."

=== Ottoman Empire ===
==== 18th century ====
In the 1700s, I'billin was one of the best cotton producing villages in the Galilee in quantity and quality. It was controlled at that time by Ali ibn Salih al-Zaydani, who sold its crop exclusively to the Dutch merchant Paul Maashoek. I'billin was visited by Richard Pococke in 1737, who mentioned it was the residence of one of the area's "great sheikhs". The sheikh hosted Pococke and dispatched with him men from his retinue. Pococke noted that the hill upon which the village sat abounded in cisterns and the forests around were covered by carob and whitish-leafed oak trees.

In 1761, the traveler Giovanni Mariti noted "the castle of Abelin, on a beautiful eminence; and a town close to it", governed by Ali's nephew Yusuf al-Umar, brother of Daher al-Umar, the 18th-century ruler of the Galilee. The castle, still extant, probably dates from the 18th century. An Arabic inscription on the old village mosque credits the construction of both the mosque and the remains of a fortification in the village to Yusuf al-Umar.

In 1799, I'billin was marked 'Obellin' on Jacotin's map surveyed during Napoleon's invasion.

==== 19th century ====
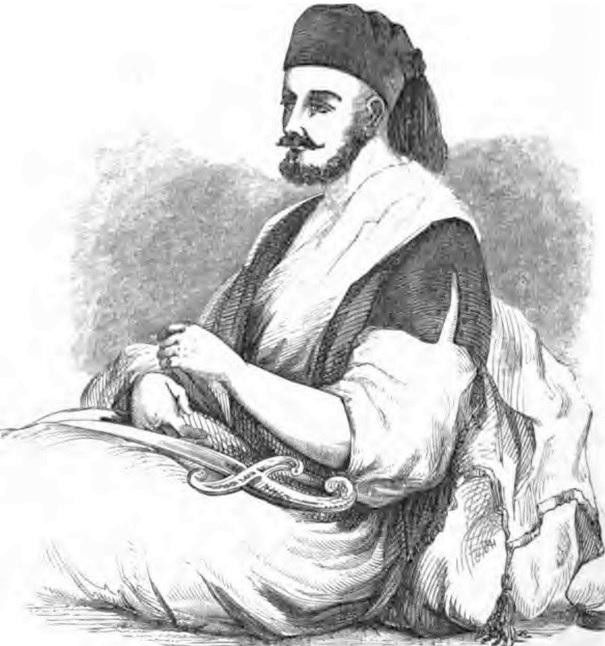
Drawing of Aqil Agha, from William Francis Lynch's book The Narrative of the United States Expedition of the River Jordan and the Dead Sea, published in 1849

The Bedouin strongman and tax farmer of the Galilee, Aqil Agha, used the fortress of I'billin, previously fortified by the family of Daher al-Umar, as his headquarters. There, in 1848, he met William F. Lynch, head of the American expedition to the River Jordan, and made him their guide. By 1852, Aqil ceased residing in I'billin, returning to his nomadic way of life. He died in 1870 and was buried in the village, where some of his descendants were still living in the 1980s.

The population in 1859 was stated by British consul Edward Thomas Rogers to have been 800 people, and the tillage fifty feddans. In 1875, the French explorer Victor Guérin visited the village. He estimated the population at 600, divided equally between Muslims and Christians, the latter split between the Melkite (Greek Catholic) and Greek Orthodox denominations. He noted that the Greek Orthodox had a church dedicated to St. George.

In 1881, the PEF's Survey of Western Palestine (SWP) described it as "A village on high ground with gardens beneath it on the south, and a spring ('Ain 'Afieh) about half a mile to the south. There is a minaret to the mosque which is a conspicuous object." According to the SWP, "The houses in the village are principally of stone; wells occur south of the hill, with olives near them. Some of the inhabitants are Greek Christians." A population list from about 1887 showed that the village had about 745 inhabitants; 400 Greek Orthodox, 70 Melkites, 30 Latin Christians and 245 Muslims.

=== British Mandate ===
In the 1922 census of Palestine conducted by the British Mandate authorities, I'billin had 528 Christians and 289 Muslims, a total population of 817. Of the Christians, 410 were Orthodox, 111 Melkite and 7 Anglican. In the 1931 census 'Arab El Hujeirat was counted together with I'billin, and the census found 663 Christians and 453 Muslims living in 192 houses.

In the 1945 statistics the population of I'billin was 1,660; 1,060 Christians and 600 Muslims, who owned 18,632 dunams of land according to an official land and population survey. 2,367 dunams were plantations and irrigable land, 8,628 used for cereals, while 95 dunams were built-up (urban) land.

=== Israel ===
I'billin was captured by the Israeli army during the first phase of Operation Dekel, 8–14 July 1948. Most of the Muslim population was expelled and replaced by Christians from neighbouring villages. The town was regularly searched for people who were not registered in the November 1948 census. On 8 January 1949 villagers from I'billin were amongst a group of 128 men, women and children, who were expelled to the West Bank at 'Ara. The town remained under martial law until 1966.

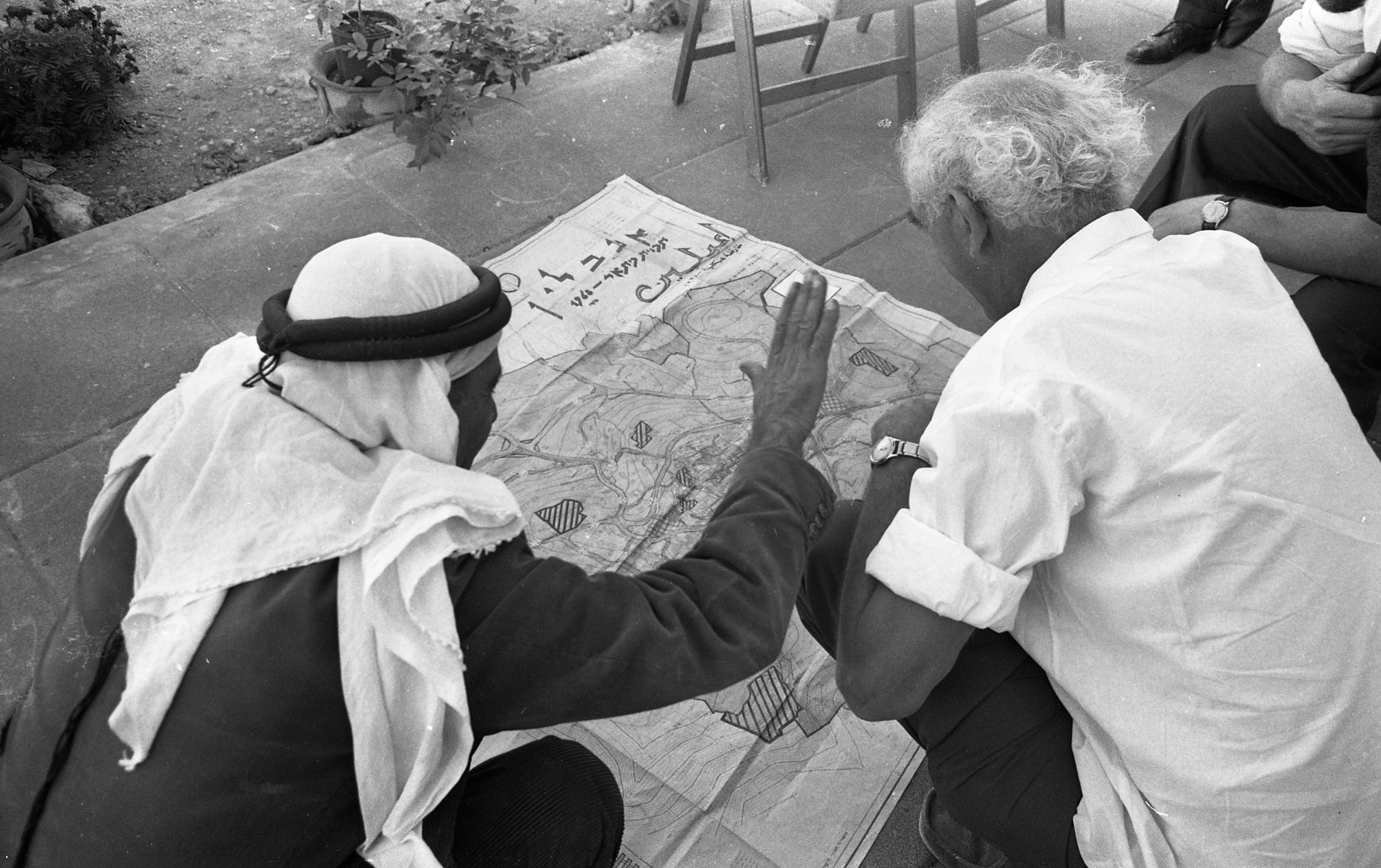
Discussions on the size of the Iblin village between the Israel Land Administration and distinguished citizens of the Arab village, 1969

== Religious communities ==
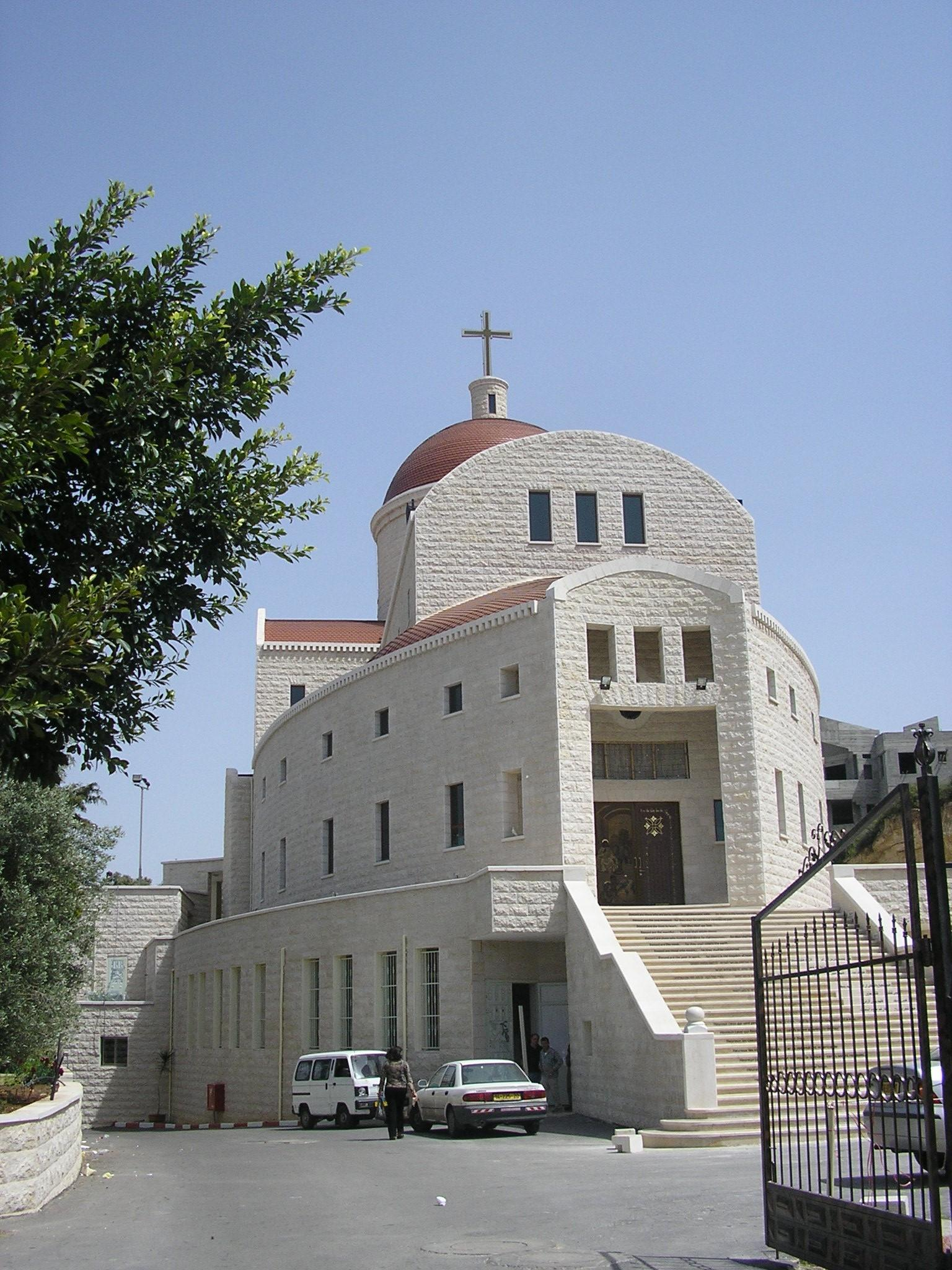
Melkite Church of the Sermon on the Mount, completed in 2006

The village is of special importance to Catholics as the birthplace of Mariam Baouardy or Bawardi (1846-1878), who was beatified by Pope John Paul II in 1983 and canonized by Pope Francis in 2015. Saint Mariam Bawardi is considered as one of the two first Palestinian saints, the other being Marie-Alphonsine Danil Ghattas.

== Education ==
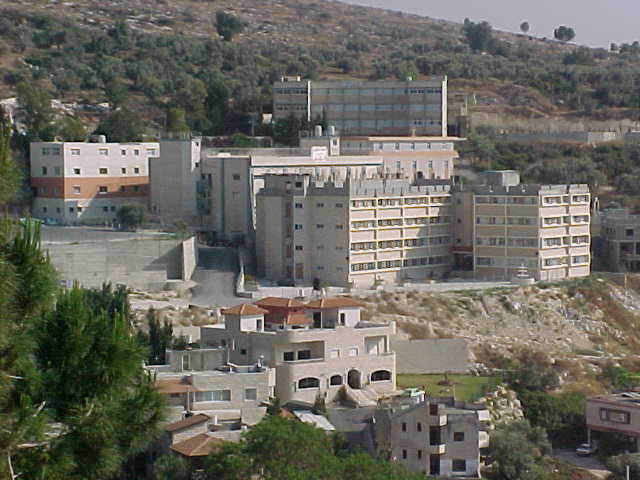
Mar Elias educational campus

In 1965 Abuna Elias Chacour, an Arab Christian from Kafr Bir'im, later Archbishop of Galilee, established a school open to all local children, regardless of religious affiliation. This developed into the Mar Elias Educational Institutions, an educational complex consisting of a kindergarten, elementary school, junior high school, high school. And formerly used to include a college and a university. The educational complex is located on Jabal al-Ghoul (Hill of Demons), on property belonging to the Melkite Church. The hill has been renamed Jabal al-Nour (Hill of Light).

"Mar Elias University" was established in 2003, claiming to be the first Arab university in Israel, though it is not officially holding a University status. It is recognized by the Council for Higher Education in Israel as a campus and operates as a branch of the University of Indianapolis in the United States. But the Israeli government ordered its closure hence it was turned into Mar Elias High School, part of the Mar Elias Educational Institutions.

== Economy ==
Ibillin historically depended on agriculture, especially the growth of sheets and vegetables (most notably cucumbers). Ibillin is also one of only municipalities in Israel that are allowed to raise pigs and to house pig farms on its land and it exports to multiple Arab Christian and Russian restaurants and factories all throughout Israel who sell pork products (most notably the Russian "Marcel Brothers - אחים מרסל" company based in Haifa).

Notable businesses in Ibillin:

- Naser Recycling: the only privately owned waste management company in Israel. Based in Ibillin, it owns and operates a waste handling complex (located in Ibillin) that includes a municipal solid waste separation plant, a compost plant, a landfill and an electricity generator powered by methane gas.
- Mar Elias Educational Institutions: educational complex consisting of a kindergarten, elementary school, junior high school, high school. The Institution is owned by Abuna Elias Chacour.
- Daoud Courtyard: One of the last heritage complexes in the Galilee villages. The complex is 120 years old and includes the house of Saint Mariam Bawardi, the Daoud family house and garden (one of the first and oldest buildings still standing in Ibillin built during the British Mandate of Palestine), and a Palestinian olive oil press.

== Demographics ==
Historical population
Year	Pop.	±%
1972	3,600	—
1983	6,300	+75.0%
1995	8,000	+27.0%
2008	11,300	+41.3%
2022	13,357	+18.2%
2024	13,634	+2.1%

== Voting Patterns ==
In the 2022 election, 90 percent of voters in I'billin voted for the Arab parties, while 6 percent voted for the parties of the center-left coalition led by Yair Lapid and 3 percent voted for the parties of the right-wing coalition led by Benjamin Netanyahu. Among the voters for the Arab parties, 53 percent voted for the Hadash–Ta'al list, while 27 percent voted for Ra'am and 20 percent voted for Balad.

In the 2026 election, 84 percent of voters in I'billin voted for the Arab parties, while 13 percent voted for the parties of the center-left coalition led by Gadi Eisenkot and 1 percent voted for the parties of the right-wing coalition led by Benjamin Netanyahu. Among the voters for the Arab parties, 73 percent voted for the Joint List, while 27 percent voted for Ra'am. Voter turnout increased 41 percent from the 2022 election.

== Notable people ==
- Aqil Agha (c. 1820–1870), Galilean strongman
- Mariam Baouardy (1846–1878), Catholic saint
- Elias Chacour (born 1939), former Archbishop of the Melkite Catholic Church for Akko, Haifa, Nazareth, and all Galilee
- Shawqi Habib (1929–2018), chemistry Teacher, Writer, Poet, First Arab to graduate from the Technion Israel Institute of Technology
- Saleh Saleem (born 1953), former politician
- Miriam Toukan (born 1982), singer

== Gallery ==
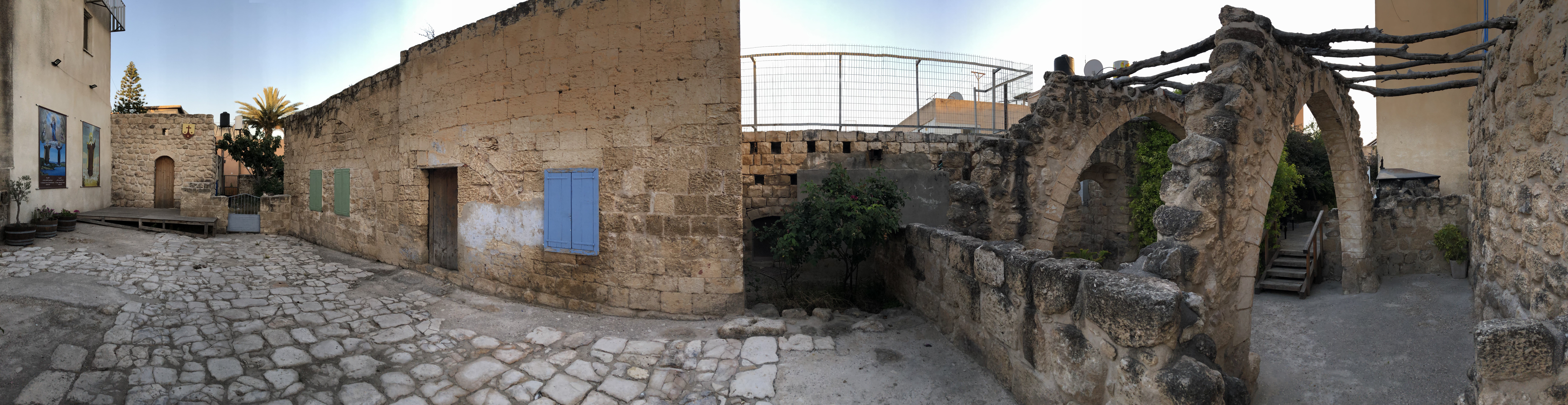
A panoramic view of the house of Saint Mariam Bawardi of Ibillin

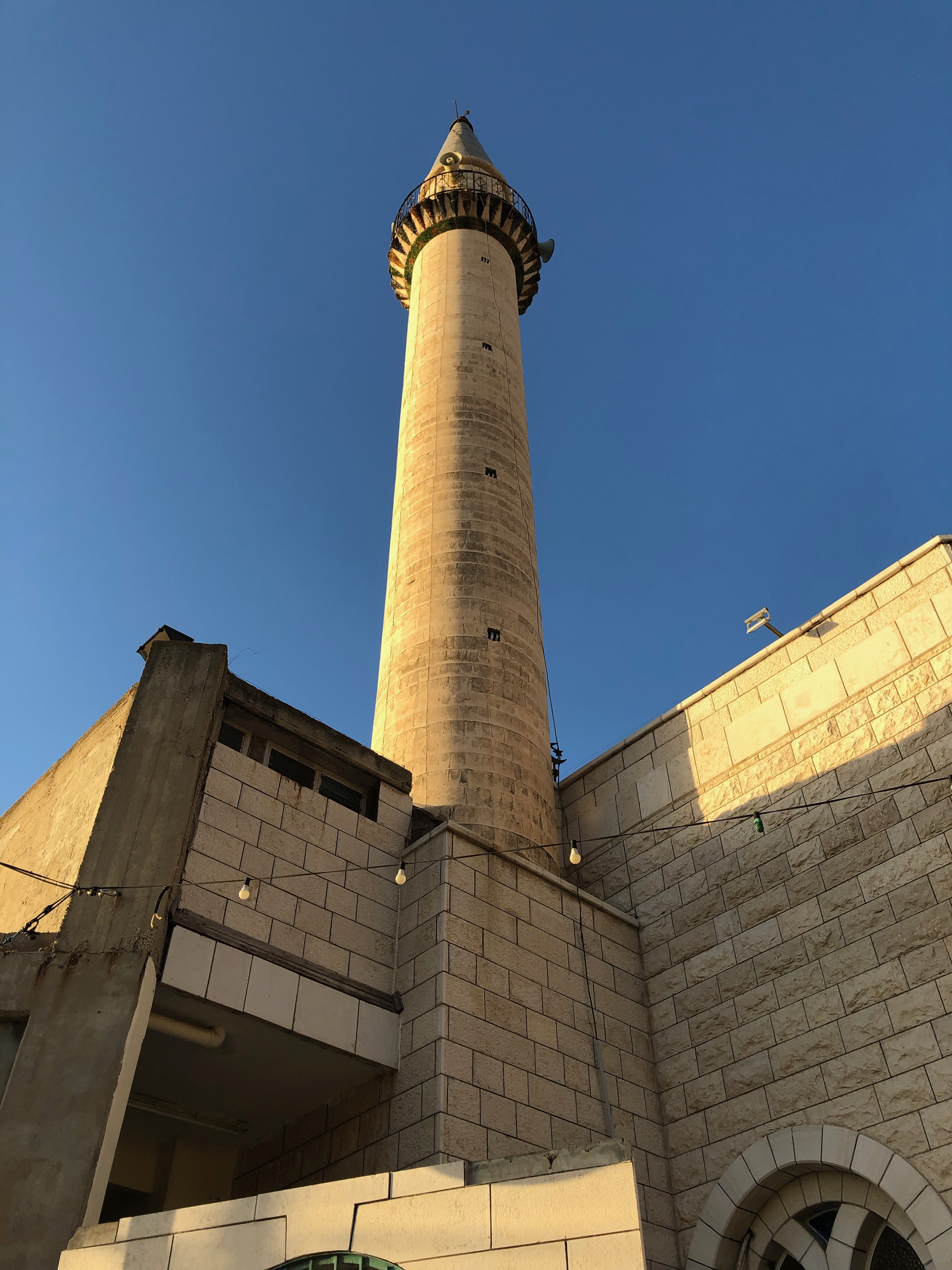
The Old Town Mosque of Ibillin in the old town.

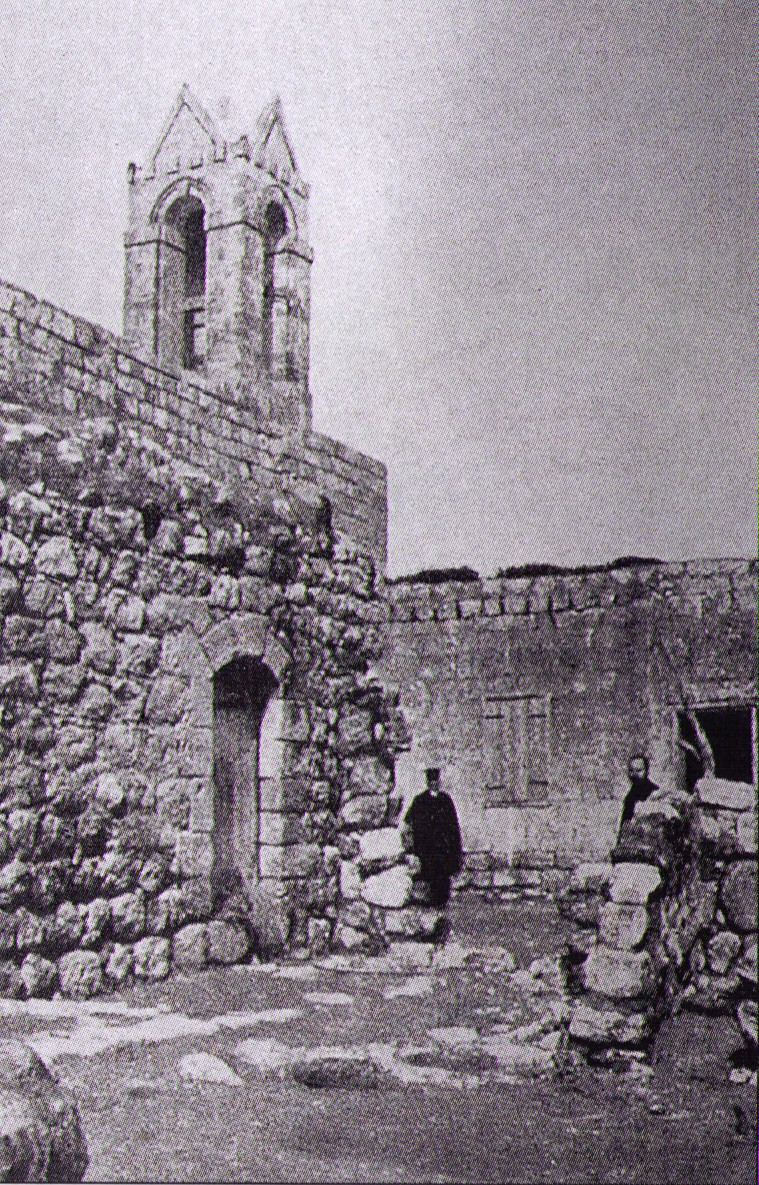
Old Church of Ibillin.

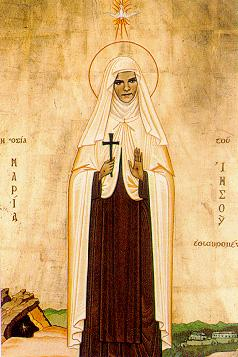
Saint Mariam Baouardy (Mary of Jesus Crucified).

== See also ==
- Arab localities in Israel
- Mariam Baouardy
- Mar Elias Educational Institutions
- Galilee

== Bibliography ==
- Abu Raya, Rafeh (2012-04-19). "'Ibillin Preliminary Report" (124). Hadashot Arkheologiyot – Excavations and Surveys in Israel.
- Barron, J. B., ed. (1923). Palestine: Report and General Abstracts of the Census of 1922. Government of Palestine.
- Cohen, Amnon (1973). Palestine in the 18th Century: Patterns of Government and Administration. Jerusalem: The Magnes Press. ISBN 978-0-19-647903-3.
- Conder, C.R.; Kitchener, H.H. (1881). The Survey of Western Palestine: Memoirs of the Topography, Orography, Hydrography, and Archaeology. Vol. 1. London: Committee of the Palestine Exploration Fund.
- Department of Statistics (1945). Village Statistics, April, 1945. Government of Palestine.
- Guérin, V. (1880). Description Géographique Historique et Archéologique de la Palestine (in French). Vol. 3: Galilee, pt. 1. Paris: L'Imprimerie Nationale.
- Hadawi, S. (1970). Village Statistics of 1945: A Classification of Land and Area ownership in Palestine. Palestine Liberation Organization Research Center.
- Jampoler, Andrew C. A. (2005). Sailors in the Holy Land: The 1848 American Expedition to the Dead Sea and the Search for Sodom and Gomorrah. Naval Institute Press. p. 120. ISBN 9781591144137.
- Karmon, Y. (1960). "An Analysis of Jacotin's Map of Palestine" (PDF). Israel Exploration Journal. 10 (3, 4): 155–173, 244–253. Archived from the original (PDF) on 2019-12-22.
- Lynch, W.F. (1849). Narrative of the United States' Expedition to the River Jordan and the Dead Sea. London: Richard Bentley.
- Mariti, G. (1792). Travels Through Cyprus, Syria, and Palestine; with a General History of the Levant. Vol. 1. Dublin: P. Byrne.
- Mills, E., ed. (1932). Census of Palestine 1931. Population of Villages, Towns and Administrative Areas. Jerusalem: Government of Palestine.
- Morris, B. (1993). Israel's Border Wars, 1949 - 1956. Arab Infiltration, Israeli Retaliation, and the Countdown to the Suez War. Oxford University Press. ISBN 0-19-827850-0.
- Morris, B. (1987). The Birth of the Palestinian refugee problem, 1947-1949. Cambridge University Press. ISBN 0-521-33028-9.
- Palmer, E.H. (1881). The Survey of Western Palestine: Arabic and English Name Lists Collected During the Survey by Lieutenants Conder and Kitchener, R. E. Transliterated and Explained by E.H. Palmer. Committee of the Palestine Exploration Fund.
- Pappé, I. (2006). The Ethnic Cleansing of Palestine. London and New York: Oneworld. ISBN 1-85168-467-0.
- Pococke, R. (1745). A Description of the East, and some Other Countries. Vol. 2. London: Printed for the author, by W. Bowyer.
- Pringle, D. (1997). Secular buildings in the Crusader Kingdom of Jerusalem: an archaeological Gazetter. Cambridge University Press. ISBN 0521-46010-7.
- Schölch, A. (1993). Palestine in Transformation, 1856–1882: Studies in Social, Economic, and Political Development (PDF). Institute for Palestine Studies. ISBN 0-88728-234-2.
- Schumacher, G. (1888). "Population list of the Liwa of Akka". Quarterly Statement - Palestine Exploration Fund. 20: 169–191.
- Strange, le, G. (1890). Palestine Under the Moslems: A Description of Syria and the Holy Land from A.D. 650 to 1500. Committee of the Palestine Exploration Fund., London,
- Van Der Steen, Eveline (1989). Near Eastern Tribal Societies During the Nineteenth Century: Economy, Society and Politics Between Tent and Town. Routledge. ISBN 978-1-317-54347-3.
