= Musa Agha al-Hasi =

- Born: Upper Egypt, Ottoman Empire
- Died: 1830; Gaza, Damascus Eyalet
- Relatives: Aqil Agha al-Hasi (son); Salih Agha al-Hasi (son); Ali al-Hasi (son)
- Military career
- Allegiance: Ottoman Empire
- Service years: 1811-1830
- Commands: Commander of Hawwara irregulars
- Conflicts: Siege of Sanur (1830)

Musa Agha al-Hasi was an Ottoman commander of Egyptian irregulars in the Galilee under governors Sulayman Pasha al-Adil and Abdullah Pasha.

== Biography ==
Musa Agha came from Faiyum in Upper Egypt. He hailed from the Bedouin Hanadi tribe. When the Ottoman commander Jezzar Pasha stayed in Egypt in the late 18th century, he developed a close association with the Ainawiyeh tribe of the Damanhur region near the Nile Delta. On Jezzar's return to Palestine to end the autonomous rule of Zahir al-Umar and his sons on behalf of the Sublime Porte, he took with him a contingent of Ainawiyeh tribesmen and gave them the honorary name of 'Arab al-Hawwara, which was meant to associate them with the well-known, but unrelated, Upper Egyptian tribe, who were "distinguished ... in bravery, horsemanship and equipments", according to Macalister and Masterman.

Following his death in 1804, Jezzar, who had become the Acre-based governor of Sidon Eyalet, was succeeded by Suleiman Pasha al-Adil. In 1811, Musa moved to Gaza in Palestine. Musa sought to enjoy the favor Suleiman and his predecessor gave to the Hawwara tribesmen and requested military service. Suleiman made him a commander of the Hawwara horsemen and his successor Abdullah Pasha promoted Musa to be in charge of an even larger Hawwara contingent. Along with his co-commander, Ali Abu Zayd Agha, Musa was in charge of 400 horsemen. According to Macalister and Masterman, Musa "was famed for his bravery and generosity."

According to Macalister and Masterman, Musa died during Abdullah Pasha's siege of Sanur. However, according to historian Alexander Schölch, he died in Gaza in 1830. Musa left three sons, Ali, Aqil, and Salih. Aqil succeeded his father as the Hawwara's commander.

== Bibliography ==
- Macalister, R. A. Stewart; Masterman, E. W. G. (1906). "Occasional Papers on the Modern inhabitants of Palestine, part V". Quarterly Statement - Palestine Exploration Fund. 38: 221–225, 286–291.
- Schölch, Alexander (1993). Palestine in Transformation, 1856-1882 (PDF). Institute for Palestine Studies. ISBN 0-88728-234-2.
- Thackston, Wheeler McIntosh (1988). Murder, Mayhem, Pillage, and Plunder: The History of the Lebanon in the 18th and 19th Centuries by Mikhayil Mishaqa (1800-1873). SUNY Press. ISBN 9780887067129.
