= Mar Elias Educational Institutions =

Coordinates: 32°48′59.63″N 35°11′32.28″E

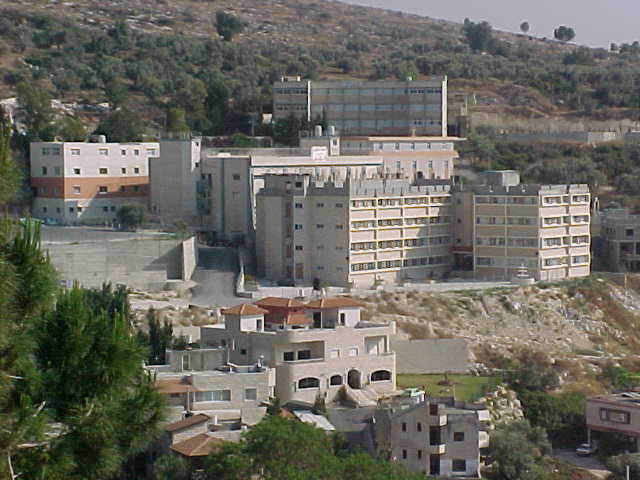
Mar Elias Buildings

Mar Elias Educational Institutions include a kindergarten, elementary, junior high, and high school. The institution is under the direction of a Board which includes the founder and retired archbishop Elias Chacour. The institutions are located in Ibillin, an Arab village in northern Israel. Arab students from all over the Galilee gather at the institutions. The Institution serves Muslim (60%), Christian (40%), and a few Druze students, while extending an invitation to students of other religions. In December 2015, the Institution was named a "Peace Academy" of the Heavenly Culture, World Peace, Restoration of Light (HWPL).[3]

== History ==
The institution is a secular school, started as a high school and a kindergarten in the early 1980s. A technical community college was later added for a short period until it closed, and afterwards an elementary and junior high schools were added. No Jewish students have been enrolled for several years. In December 2015, the Institution was named a "Peace Academy" of the Heavenly Culture, World Peace, Restoration of Light (HWPL).

== Mar Elias High School ==
The high school is considered the centerpiece of the Mar Elias Institutions. There are more than 1200 students from all over Galilee enrolled in its classes. The high school serves Muslim (60%), Christian (40%), and a few Druze students. Jewish students no longer attend MEEI, however a few Jewish teachers are on staff.

The students of Mar Elias High are encouraged to participate in programs which try to establish long term relationships with people from other backgrounds.

The students are asked to choose a major during the beginning of the 10th grade. The majors that are currently taught at Mar Elias High include:

- Physics
- Biotechnology
- Electronics
- Computer Science
- Chemistry
- Biology
- Sports
- Ecology
- Psychology
- Sociology

== Mariam Bawardi Kindergarten ==
The Mariam Bawardi Kindergarten was founded in 1968, as the first Kindergarten in Ibillin. It started in priest Elias Chacour's office.

The Kindergarten is now housed in the basement of the original high school. It serves more than 200 children between the ages of three and five years old.

== Miriam Bawardi Elementary School ==
The children who complete kindergarten can directly enroll in the Miriam Bawardi Elementary School which serves over 1000 students. The school received its license in 2001/2002.

The elementary school shares a building with the MEEI guesthouse, which is located on the top floor. The building was constructed in 2004 west of the original high school.

== Miriam Bawardi Junior High ==
The junior high school serves about 300 students, some of whom live outside Ibillin. The junior high school and elementary schools are jointly administered by the elementary school principal. The junior high school classrooms are now located in the original high school building.

== Mar Elias College ==
The academic campus in Mar Elias College in I'billin, as an Academic branch of the University of Indianapolis in the Galilee, was closed and the academic campus moved to operate as a Campus in Nazareth.

== See also ==
- Mariam Baouardy
