= Elias Chacour =

Arab-Israeli archbishop

- Archbishop of Haifa
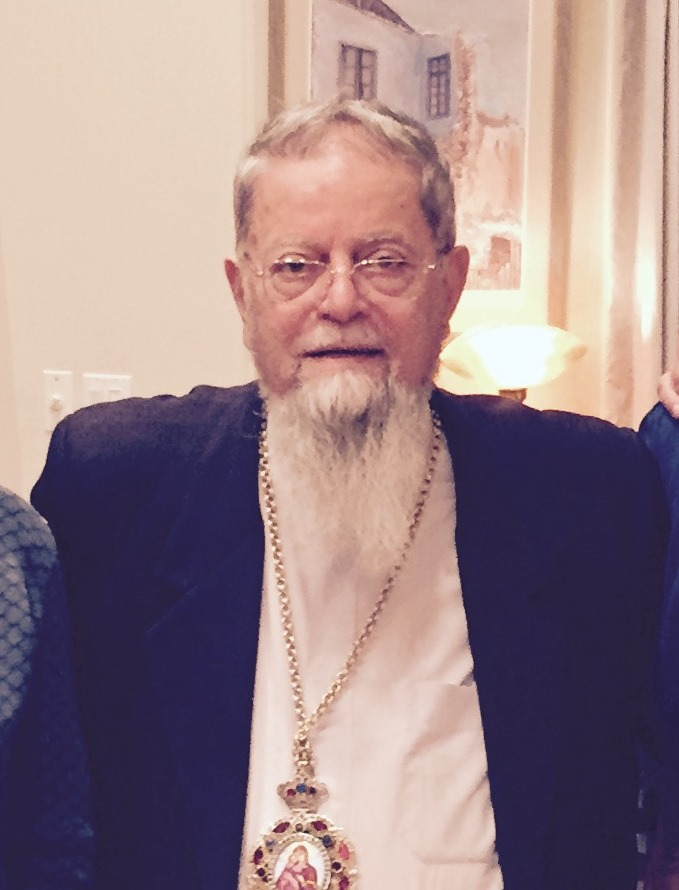
- Native name: الياس شقور
- Church: Melkite Greek Catholic
- See: Eparchate of Akko, Haifa, Nazareth and All Galilee
- In office: 7 February 2006 – 27 January 2014
- Predecessor: Archbishop Pierre Mouallem
- Successor: Archbishop George Bacouni

Personal details
- Born: 29 November 1939 (age 86) Kafr Bir'im in the Upper Galilee, Mandatory Palestine

Elias Chacour (Arabic: الياس شقور, Hebrew: אליאס שקור; born 29 November 1939) is a Palestinian Arab-Israeli who served as the Archbishop of Akko, Haifa, Nazareth and All Galilee of the Melkite Greek Catholic Church from 2006 to 2014. Noted for his efforts to promote reconciliation between Palestinians and Jews, he is the author of two books about the experience of Palestinian people living in present-day Israel. He describes himself as a "Palestinian-Arab-Christian-Israeli."

== Biography ==
Elias Michael Chacour was born in the village of Kafr Bir'im in the Upper Galilee, Mandatory Palestine to a Palestinian Christian family of the Melkite Greek Catholic Church. His family took refuge in the neighboring village of Jish after Bir'im was occupied by Yishuv forces. Chacour and his family became Israeli citizens in 1948, after the establishment of the state. He attended a boarding school in Haifa and then a high school in Nazareth. He studied theology at St. Sulpice Seminary in Paris. Returning to Israel in 1965, he was ordained a priest by Archbishop George Selim Hakim of Akko, Haifa, Nazareth and all Galilee, who became Patriarch Maximos V two years later. He later studied Bible and Talmud as well as Aramaic and Syriac at the Hebrew University of Jerusalem, becoming the first Arab to gain a higher degree there.

== Educational activism ==
Chacour came to the village of Ibillin in the Galilee as a young priest in 1965. This village was the birthplace of the most recent saint of the Melkite Church, Blessed Miriam Bawardy, a Discalced Carmelite mystic of the 19th century responsible for the Carmel of Saint David's Tower in Bethlehem who was beatified by Pope John Paul II on 13 November 1983.

Elias, seeing the lack of educational opportunities for Arab youth beyond the 8th grade, created a school open to all local children regardless of religious affiliation. A school was built in the early 1980s on an empty hillside now known as the Mount of Light (Jebel an-Nour). The school now includes a kindergarten, primary school, high school and program for gifted children. The co-educational Mar Elias Educational Institutions has an enrollment of 2,750 students from age 3 through 18, including Muslims, Christians, and Druze.

== Ecclesiastical career ==
On 7 February 2006, Chacour was elected by the Melkite Holy Synod as Archbishop of Akko, Haifa, Nazareth and all Galilee. The main city of his diocese is Haifa, the great city of northern Israel. He was consecrated a bishop in the church of Saint Elias in Ibillin and his enthronement in the Haifa Cathedral was broadcast by the Melkite Ecumenical television station "Noursat" which originates in Beirut, Lebanon. Chacour is vice president of the Sabeel Ecumenical Liberation Theology Center.

On 27 January 2014 Pope Francis announced that he had accepted a request from Chacour, who had asked permission in 2013 to retire a year early.

== Views and opinions ==
An advocate of non-violence, Chacour travels often between the Middle East and other countries around the world. In addition, many visitors, fact-finding missions, and pilgrims have come to Ibillin. In recognition of his humanitarian efforts he has received honors including the World Methodist Peace Award, the Chevalier de la Legion d'Honneur, the Peacemakers in Action Award from the Tanenbaum Center for Interreligious Understanding, and the Niwano Peace Prize (Japan) as well as honorary doctorates from five universities including Duke and Emory. In 2001 Chacour was named "Man of the Year" in Israel.

In 2001, Chacour gave an address at commencement at Emory University, in Atlanta, Georgia, where he accepted an honorary degree. An excerpt from his speech:

You who live in the United States, if you are pro-Israel, on behalf of the Palestinian children I call unto you: give further friendship to Israel. They need your friendship. But stop interpreting that friendship as an automatic antipathy against me, the Palestinian who is paying the bill for what others have done against my beloved Jewish brothers and sisters in the Holocaust and Auschwitz and elsewhere.

And if you have been enlightened enough to take the side of the Palestinians -- oh, bless your hearts -- take our sides, because for once you will be on the right side, right? But if taking our side would mean to become one-sided against my Jewish brothers and sisters, back up. We do not need such friendship. We need one more common friend. We do not need one more enemy, for God's sake.

From a 9 February 2006 speech regarding becoming Archbishop of Galilee:

I did not dream of this responsibility and this great honor. My dreams were different. At sixty-five years of age my ambition was to dedicate the rest of my life to prayer, reading and writing, but like Paul on the way to Damascus the Lord seems to tell me that he is the one in control. My answer is, "Here I am Lord. I am your servant to continue the ministry of reconciliation and to proclaim more forcefully the Good News about the Empty Tomb and the Risen Lord." No doubt my first reaction was tears of awe, of joy and of gratitude.

== Awards ==
Chacour is the winner of the Niwano Peace Award and has been nominated three times for the Nobel Peace Prize.

== Published works ==
Chacour is the author of two best selling books, Blood Brothers and We Belong to the Land. Blood Brothers covers his childhood growing up in the town of Biram, his development into a young man, and his early years as a priest in Ibillin. This book has been translated into more than twenty languages.

His second book, We Belong to the Land, recounts his work in the development of Mar Elias Educational Institutions, from humble beginnings to major schools for educating Palestinian Muslim, Christian and Druze young people and for helping to bring about reconciliation in a land of strife. This book has been translated into eleven languages.

== See also ==
- Boutros Mouallem
- Political theology in the Middle East
