= Mariam Baouardy =

Palestinian Melkite Carmelite nun and saint (1846–1878)

Saint Mary of Jesus Crucified القديسة مريم بواردي OCD
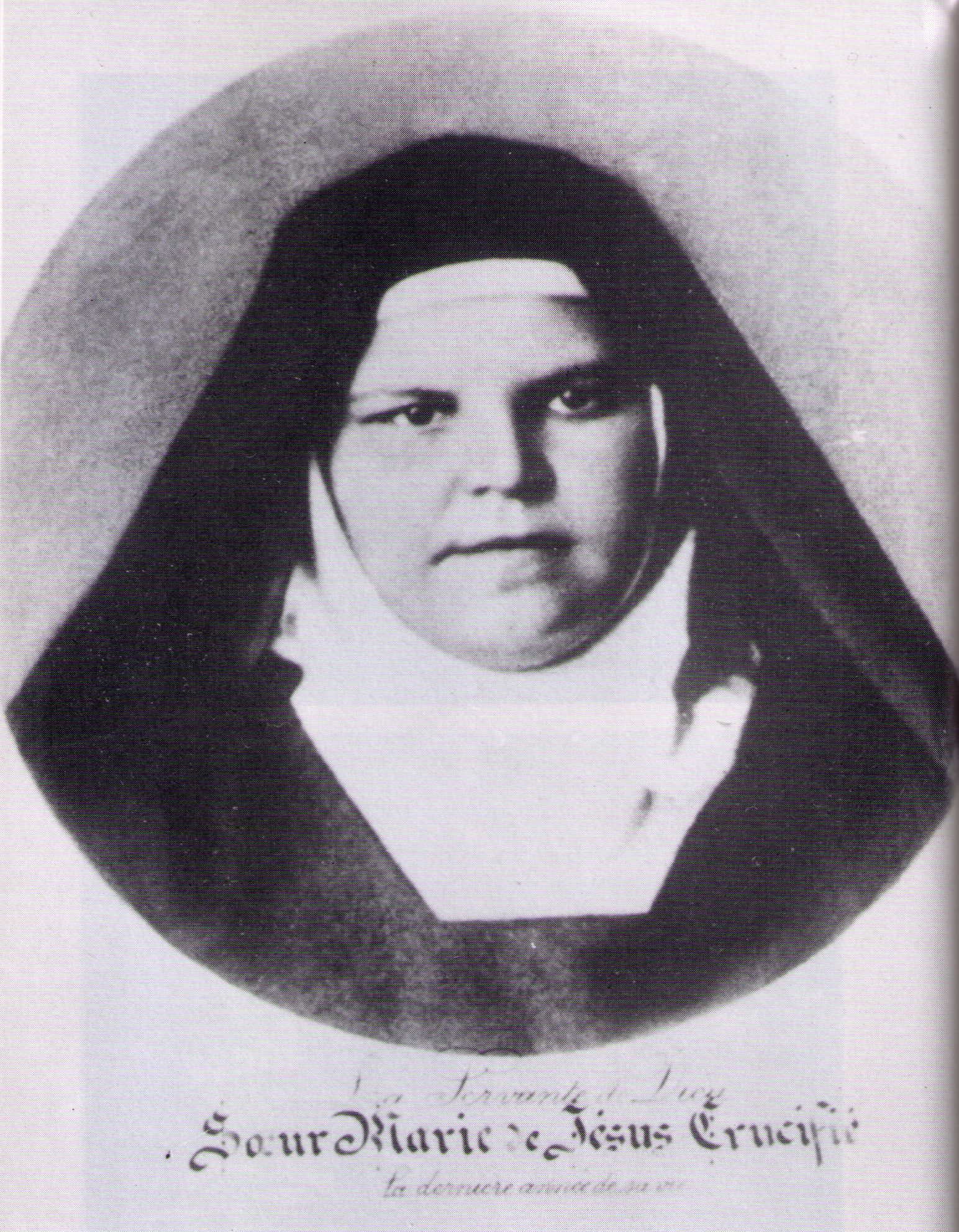
- Photo c. August 1875.

Virgin
- Born: Maryam Baouardy; 5 January 1846; I'billin, Ottoman Syria
- Died: 26 August 1878 (aged 32); Bethlehem, Mutasarrifate of Jerusalem
- Venerated in: Catholic Church
- Beatified: 13 November 1983, Saint Peter's Square by Pope John Paul II
- Canonized: 17 May 2015, Saint Peter's Square by Pope Francis
- Feast: 25/26 August

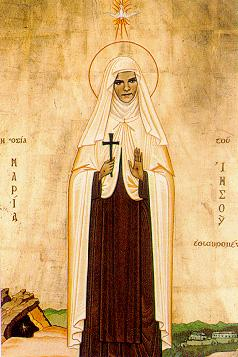
Mariam of Bethlehem

Mariam Baouardy, OCD (Arabic: مريم بواردي; religious name Mary of Jesus Crucified; 5 January 1846 – 26 August 1878) was a Palestinian Discalced Carmelite nun of the Melkite Greek Catholic Church. Born to parents from the town of Hurfiesh in the upper Galilee, she later moved to I’billin and was known for her service to the poor. In addition, she was a Christian mystic who suffered the stigmata. She was beatified by Pope John Paul II on 13 November 1983 and canonized on 17 May 2015 by Pope Francis.

== Life ==
=== Early life ===
Baouardy was born on 5 January 1846 (the eve of Epiphany) in the Galilean village of Hurfeish, and later moved to I'billin, in the Ottoman Empire. Her ancestors originated in Damascus. Her father was Giries (George) Baouardy and her mother was Mariam Chahine. Mariam was their 13th child and first daughter, and none of her preceding brothers had survived infancy. She was born after the couple made a pilgrimage on foot to Bethlehem, some 70 miles away, out of desperation after the loss of their children. When they were later blessed with the birth of a daughter, they named her after the Virgin Mary, out of gratitude. She was joined by a new brother, Boulos, two years later.

Baouardy was not yet three years old when her parents died from an illness in 1848, only a few days apart. The siblings were each taken in by relatives on different sides of her family living in other villages. She was taken by a paternal uncle who lived in the same village, and her brother went to live with a maternal aunt. The brother and sister would never see one another again. She was raised in a loving home in comfortable circumstances. As a child, she had a marked spirit of religious fervor, and at the age of five began to fast on Saturdays in honor of the Blessed Virgin.

When Baouardy was eight, her uncle and his wife moved to Alexandria, Egypt to improve their situation. Five years later, in 1858, when she was aged 13, in keeping with tradition, she was engaged by her uncle to his wife's brother, who lived in Cairo. The night before the wedding, she had a religious experience in which she felt called not to marry but to offer her life to God. Upon being told this the following morning, her uncle flew into a rage and beat her severely. Despite this and the subsequent ill-treatment she began to experience from her uncle, she stayed firm in her decision.

Nonetheless, Baouardy felt depressed and alone. She wrote her brother, then living in Nazareth, asking him to visit her. The young male servant she asked to deliver the letter drew out of her the cause for her sadness. Upon learning of this, he attempted to woo her for himself, inviting her to convert to Islam. She rejected his proposal, which caused the young man to fly into a rage, in which he drew a knife and cut her throat. He then dumped her body in a nearby alley.

Baouardy then experienced what she was convinced was a miracle. As she related later, a "nun dressed in blue" brought her to a grotto which she could never identify, stitched her wounds, and took care of her. Her voice was affected for the rest of her life as a result of the cut, which a French doctor later measured as being 10 cm. (nearly 4 inches) wide. After being cared for by this mysterious figure for a month, she recovered enough to leave and find work as a domestic servant in the home of an Arab Christian family in the city.

After a year, Baouardy decided to try to meet her brother and traveled by caravan to Jerusalem. She felt inspired to make a vow of perpetual virginity there at the Holy Sepulchre. She then took a boat in Jaffa intending to head to Acre. Due to poor weather, however, the boat had to stop at Beirut. Taking this as a sign from God, she disembarked and found work as a maid. After working there, she suddenly became blind, which lasted for 40 days, when just as suddenly she recovered her vision. Not long after that, she had a severe fall which seemed to leave her for dead. Her employer cared for her for a month until she recovered, wholly healed.

=== France and Carmel ===
In May 1863, a generous patron made it possible for Baouardy to move to Marseille, France, where she became the cook for an Arab family. While there, she felt called to enter a religious order. Rejected by the first groups to which she sought admission, in May 1865, she was accepted as a postulant by the Congregation of the Sisters of St. Joseph of the Apparition, who had communities in the Holy Land and already had several Palestinian candidates. It was at this point that she received the stigmata of Christ.

During the last month of this period of candidacy, the Mistress of novices, Mother Honorine, who had drawn Baouardy's life story from her, was replaced by Mother Veronica of the Passion. After two years as a postulant, Baouardy was up for a vote by the community regarding her admission to the congregation. To her dismay, she was rejected by the sisters charged with making the decision.

At that point, Mother Veronica had just received permission to transfer to the Discalced Carmelite monastery at Pau to prepare for her forming a new congregation of Religious Sisters serving in India, the Sisters of the Apostolic Carmel. She invited Baouardy to go with her, writing to that community's prioress and recommending that they accept the young Arab woman. The prioress took Mother Veronica's advice. In June 1867, both women went to Pau, where they received the Carmelite religious habit. Baourdy was given the religious name Mary of Jesus Crucified.

In 1870, Baouardy went with the first group of Carmelite Apostolic Sisters to Mangalore, India. She served there for two years before returning to Pau. There she made her profession of solemn vows in November 1871. In September 1875, she helped to found a new monastery in Bethlehem, the first of the Order in that region, where she lived until her death. During her whole life, she experienced periods of religious ecstasy frequently throughout the day.

In April 1878, Baouardy played an important role in the identification of the Biblical Emmaus thanks to a private revelation. She died on 26 August 1878 in Bethlehem from cancer that had developed in her bones due to the fall she had while working in the monastery, which led to gangrene that spread to her lungs.

== Veneration ==
Baouardy's spiritual writings were approved by theologians on 20 July 1924. Her cause was formally opened on 18 May 1927, granting her the title of Servant of God. Baouardy was declared Venerable on 27 November 1981 and beatified by Pope John Paul II on 13 November 1983.

Her path to canonization solidified on 6 December 2014 with the recognition of a miracle attributed to her intercession. In the consistory of 14 February 2015, it was announced that she would be canonized. Finally she was canonized on 17 May 2015 by Pope Francis. She became the second Greek Catholic to be formally canonized a saint of the Catholic Church, the first being Josaphat Kuntsevych in 1867.

Although Baouardy died on 26 August, her memorial on the Discalced Carmelite liturgical calendar is the day before, due to the memorial of "The Transverberation of the Heart of St. Teresa of Jesus, Our Mother" on 26 August. The Melkite Greek Catholic Church commemorates her on 26 August. She is listed in the 2004 Martyrologium Romanum on 26 August.

In I'billin, a kindergarten, the Miriam Bawardi Elementary School and a junior high school are named after Baouardy.

== See also ==
- Emmaus Nicopolis
- Elias Chacour
- Marie-Alphonsine Danil Ghattas

== External sources ==
- Blessed Mariam of Bethlehem at the site of the Carmelites of the Holy Land
