= James Lewis Farley =

Irish banker, diplomat and writer on Eastern affairs (1823 – 1885)

James Lewis Farley (9 September 1823 – 12 November 1885), was an Irish banker, diplomat and writer on Eastern affairs.

== Early life ==
Farley was born in Dublin on 9 September 1823, the only son of Thomas Farley of Meiltran, County Cavan. He was destined for the legal profession, and studied at Trinity College. His attention, however, was early directed to Turkey and the East.

== Banking career ==
After the conclusion of the Crimean War and the signing of the peace of Paris in 1856, the Ottoman Bank was formed through the efforts of English capitalists. Farley accepted the post of chief accountant of the branch at Beirut, which he assisted in successfully establishing.

In 1860 Farley was appointed accountant-general of the state bank of Turkey at Constantinople, which subsequently became merged in the Imperial Ottoman Bank. From this time forward he was a close student of the Turkish empire, and gained a wide knowledge of its people and rulers, as well as of its trade and financial condition.

== Writing ==
In 1858 he published a work on 'The Massacres in Syria,’ warmly defending the cause of the Christians.

Farley wrote in 1861 an account of 'The Druses and the Maronites.' The following year he issued his work on 'The Resources of Turkey,’ which dealt especially with the question of the profitable investment of capital in the Ottoman Empire. The writer showed that the extension of British trade throughout the Turkish empire was mainly due to the energy and perseverance of the Greeks. 'Banking in Turkey' appeared in 1863, and 'Turkey; a Sketch of its Rise, Progress, and Present Position,’ in 1866. Farley issued a further work on 'Modern Turkey' in 1872, which was followed in 1875 by a brochure on 'The Decline of Turkey Financially and Politically,’ in which he warned Turkish bondholders of their impending dangers.

Farley had been on intimate personal terms with Fuad and A'ali Pasha, but after their fall he severely condemned the misrule and oppression of their successors. In consequence of the breaking out of the Bulgarian massacres in 1876, Farley published his 'Turks and Christians: a Solution of the Eastern Question,’ which attracted much attention. The author suggested reforms which would combine administrative autonomy for the Christian populations with the maintenance of the authority of the sultan. Some of his suggestions were pressed upon the Porte by the great powers, and ultimately adopted. In 1878 Farley published a descriptive and historical work, entitled 'Egypt, Cyprus, and Asiatic Turkey.' On the formation of the new principality of Bulgaria in 1880, he journeyed to Sofia in order to be present at the reception of the newly elected ruler, Prince Alexander I. On his return to England he published a monograph on the principality and its governor, under the title of 'New Bulgaria.'

== Diplomatic career ==
Farley was in Egypt during the sultan's visit in 1863, and at Constantinople on the occasion of the royal and imperial visits to the Turkish capital in 1869. As some recognition of his literary services to the Ottoman Empire, he was appointed in March 1870 consul at Bristol for his imperial majesty the sultan, and this post he held until 1884. He wrote a series of 'Letters on Turkey' to a Bristol journal, and made considerable efforts to develop the trade between the port of Bristol and the Levant.

== Personal ==
Farley was a fellow of the Statistical Society of London, a corresponding member of the Institut Égyptien (founded by Napoleon I at Alexandria), and a privy councillor in the public works department of Bulgaria. His great knowledge of Bulgarian affairs caused him to be frequently referred to at the time the Bulgarian question agitated Europe.

Farley died at Bayswater, London, on 12 November 1885.
