= Alexander Schölch =

German orientalist (1949–1986)

Alexander Schölch (19 October 1943 – 29 August 1986) was a German orientalist and historian noted for his research on 19th- and 20th-century Middle-Eastern history.

== Life ==
Schölch was born in Mosbach and studied history, politics, international law and oriental languages at Heidelberg University, LMU Munich, and the University of Oxford. He then took up a position as a researcher at the Institut für Islamwissenschaft at the Free University of Berlin, with a focus on the socio-economic development of Palestine from 1856 to 1882, before moving to the University of Duisburg-Essen, where he served as a lecturer from 1975 to 1982 and as professor of Extra-European History from 1982 to 1984. From 1984 to 1986 he was the professor of Politics and Contemporary History of the Middle East at the University of Erlangen.

Schölch was noted for his research on 19th- and 20th-century Middle-Eastern history. His doctoral thesis on Egypt was published in English, and together with Alexander Flores he edited a reader on Israel's Arab minority. He also did research on German–Jewish and German–Israeli relations. Schölch died unexpectedly of heart failure in 1986.

== Publications (selection) ==
- Palästina im Umbruch 1856–1882: Untersuchungen zur wirtschaftlichen und sozio-politischen Entwicklung. Berliner Islamstudien; Steiner Verlag Wiesbaden, Stuttgart 1986, ISBN 978-3-515-04467-7.
  - Palestine in Transformation, 1856–1882. Studies in Social, Economic and Political Development, Institute for Palestine Studies (1993; paperback edition 2006).
- The Decline of Local Power in Palestine after 1856: The Case of Aqîl Agâ. Die Welt des Islams (1984).
- Ägypten in der ersten und Japan in der zweiten Hälfte des 19. Jahrhunderts: ein entwicklungsgeschichtlicher Vergleich (1982).
- Zum Problem eines außereuropäischen Feudalismus: Bauern, Händler, Lokalherren und Händler im Libanon und in Palästina in osmanischer Zeit (1981).
- Egypt for the Egyptians: The Socio-Political Crisis in Egypt 1878–82. Ithaca Press (1981).
