= Arab citizens of Israel =

المواطنون العرب في إسرائيل עֲרָבִים אֶזרָחֵי יִשְׂרָאֵל
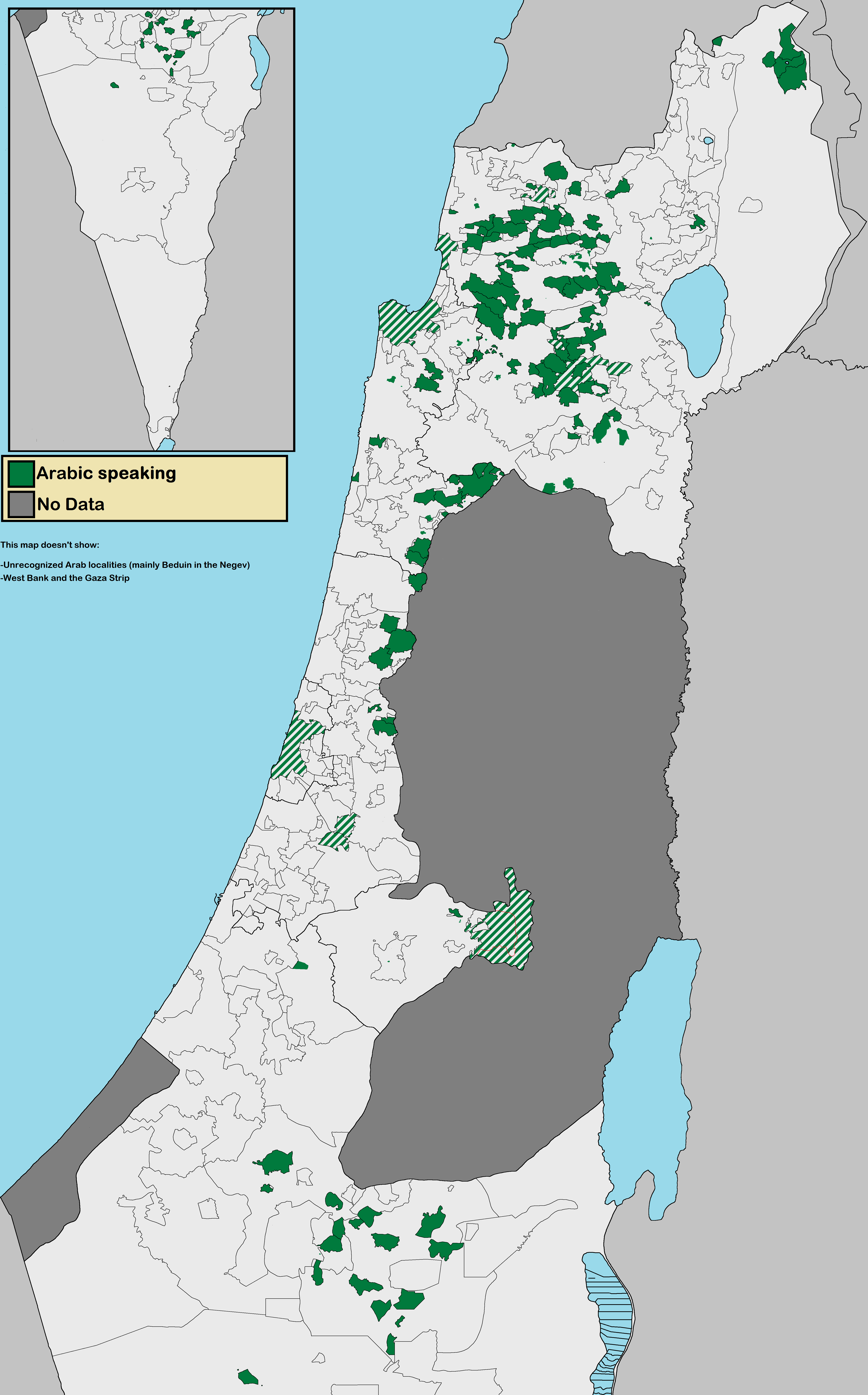
- Map of Arab localities in Israel, 2015

Total population
- Green Line, 2023: 2,065,000 (21%) East Jerusalem and Golan Heights, 2012: 278,000 (~3%)

Regions with significant populations
- State of Israel

Languages
- Arabic (Note: Traditionally Lebanese Arabic in northern Israel, Palestinian Arabic in central Israel, and Bedouin dialects in southern Israel.) and Hebrew

Religion
- Islam (84%) (Note: Predominantly Sunni Islam.); Christianity (8%) (Note: Predominantly Eastern Catholicism and Greek Orthodox.); Druze (8%)

Related ethnic groups
- Broader Arab groups such as Palestinians, Druze and Bedouins living beyond the borders of Israel.

Palestinians form the largest ethnic minority in Israel. Notions of identity among Arab citizens of Israel are complex, encompassing civic, religious, and ethnic components. Most sources report that the majority of Arabs in Israel prefer to be identified as Palestinian citizens of Israel.

In the wake of the 1948 Palestine war, the Israeli government conferred Israeli citizenship upon all Palestinians who had remained or were not expelled. However, they were subject to martial law until 1966, while other Israeli citizens were not. In the early 1980s, Israel granted citizenship eligibility to the Palestinians in East Jerusalem and the Syrian citizens of the Golan Heights by annexing both areas, though they remain internationally recognized as part of the Israeli-occupied territories, which came into being after the Six-Day War of 1967. Acquisition of Israeli citizenship in East Jerusalem has been scarce, as only 5% of Palestinians in East Jerusalem were Israeli citizens in 2022, largely due to Palestinian society's disapproval of naturalization as complicity with the occupation. Israel has made the process more difficult, approving only 38% of new Palestinian applications from 2002 to 2022.

According to the Israel Central Bureau of Statistics, the Israeli Arab population stood at 2.1 million people in 2023, accounting for 21% of Israel's total population. The majority of these Arab citizens identify themselves as Arab or Palestinian by nationality and as Israeli by citizenship. They mostly live in Arab-majority towns and cities, some of which are among the poorest in the country, and generally attend schools that are separated to some degree from those attended by Jewish Israelis. Arab political parties traditionally did not join governing coalitions until 2021, when the United Arab List became the first to do so. The Druze and the Bedouin in the Negev and the Galilee have historically expressed the strongest non-Jewish affinity to Israel and are more likely to identify as Israelis than other Arab citizens.

Speakers of both Arabic and Hebrew, their traditional vernaculars are mostly Levantine Arabic dialects, such as Palestinian Arabic in central Israel and Lebanese Arabic further north, particularly among the Druze. Negev Bedouins, on the other hand, speak a Northwest Arabian dialect. Because the modern Arabic dialects of Israel's Arabs have absorbed multiple Hebrew loanwords and phrases, it is sometimes called the Israeli Arabic dialect. By religious affiliation, the majority of Arab Israelis are Muslims, but there are significant Christian and Druze minorities, among others. Arab citizens of Israel have a wide variety of self-identification: as Israeli or "in Israel"; as Arabs or Palestinians; and as Muslims, Christians or Druze.

== Terminology and identity ==
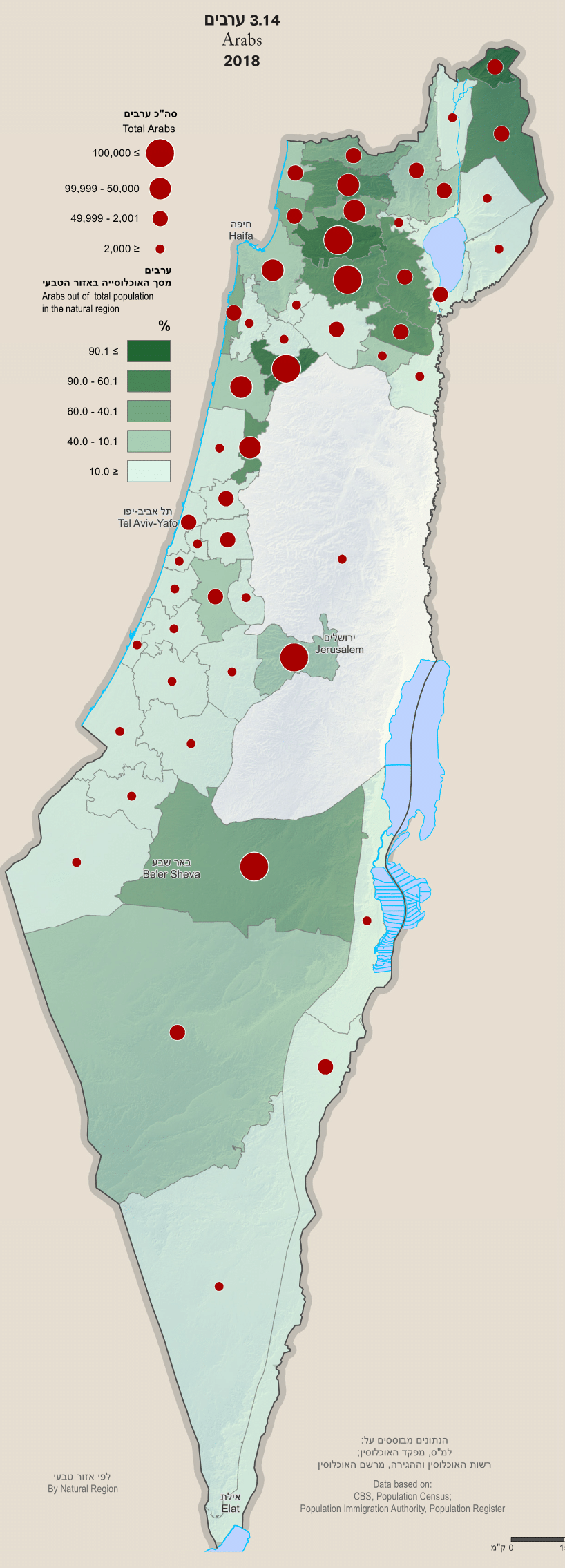
Arabs in Israel, by natural region (2018).

The choice of terms to refer to Arab citizens of Israel is a highly politicized issue, and there is a broad range of labels that members of this community use to self-identity. Generally speaking, supporters of Israel tend to use Israeli Arab or Arab Israeli to refer to this population without mentioning Palestine, while critics of Israel (or supporters of Palestinians) tend to use Palestinian or Palestinian Arab without referencing Israel. According to The New York Times, most preferred to identify themselves as Palestinian citizens of Israel rather than as Israeli Arabs, as of 2012. The New York Times uses both 'Palestinian Israelis' and 'Israeli Arabs' to refer to the same population.

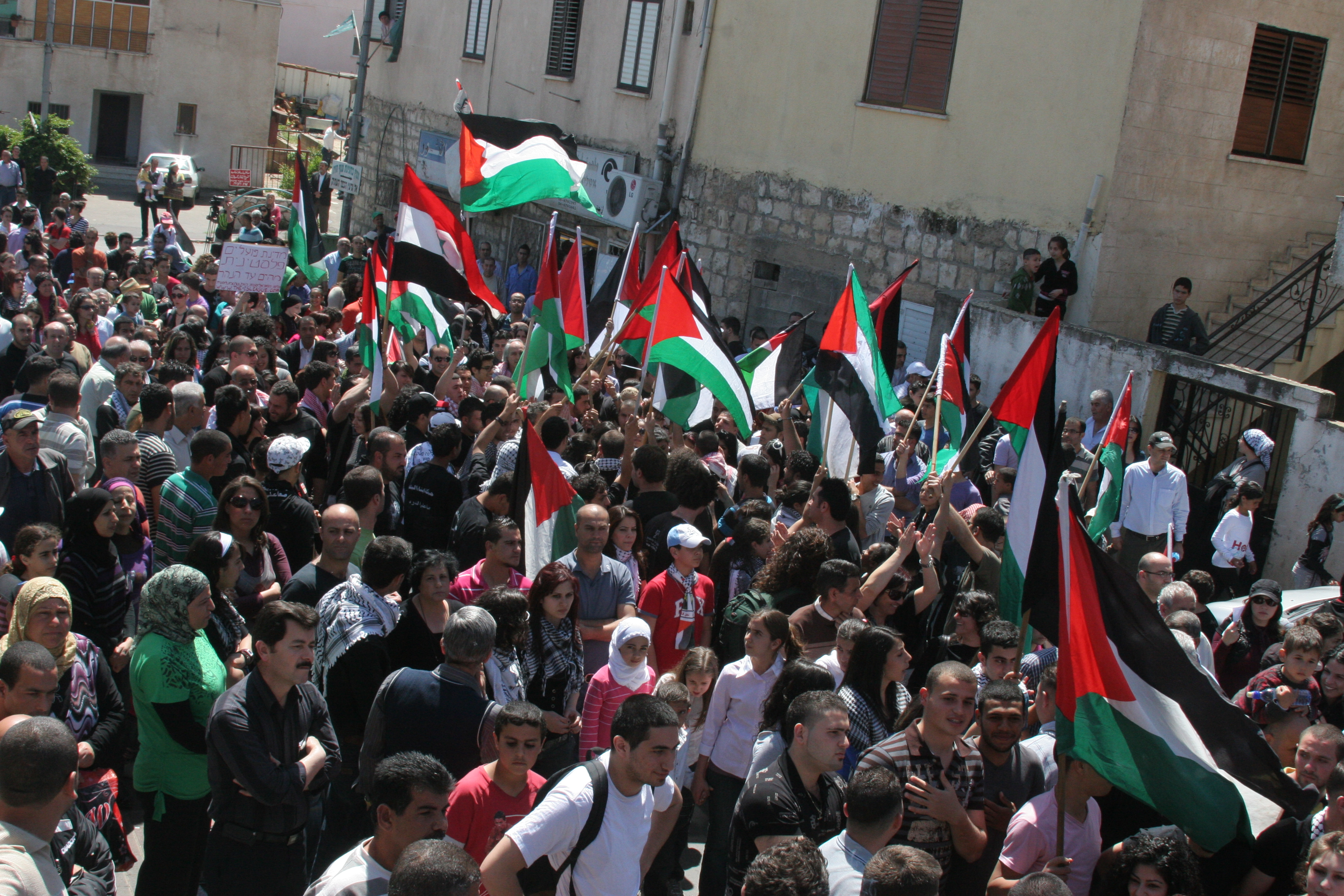
Israeli Arabs at a Land Day rally in Sakhnin, 30 March 2010

The relationship of Arab citizens to the State of Israel is often fraught with tension and can be regarded in the context of relations between minority populations and state authorities elsewhere in the world. Arab citizens consider themselves to be an indigenous people.

=== List of demonyms ===
Arab/Palestinian citizens of Israel may refer to themselves by a wide range of terms. Each of these names, while referring to the same group of people, connotes a different balance in what is often a multilayered identity assigning varying levels of priority or emphasis to the various dimensions which may be historic-geographic ("Palestine (region)"), "national" or ethnoreligious (Palestinian, Arab, Israeli, Druze, Circassian), linguistic (Arabic-speaking), civic (feeling "Israeli" or not), etc.:

- Palestinian citizens of Israel is a term that most Arab citizens of Israel prefer to refer to themselves, and which some media (BBC, New York Times, Washington Post, NBC News) and other organizations use to refer to Israeli Arabs, either consistently or alternating the use of other terms for Israeli Arabs.
- Palestinian Arabs
- Palestinian Arabs in Israel
- Palestinian Israelis
- Palestinians in Israel
- Israeli Arabs
- Israeli Palestinian Arabs
- Israeli Palestinians
- Arab citizens of Israel
- Arab Israelis
- 48ers, '48 Arabs

Two appellations, among others listed above, are not applied to the East Jerusalem Arab population or the Druze in the Golan Heights, as these territories were occupied by Israel in 1967:

- the Arabs inside the Green Line
- the Arabs within (Arabic: عرب الداخل, romanized: ‘Arab al-Dākhil).

=== Demonym preferences ===
According to The New York Times, as of 2012, most Israeli Arabs preferred to identify themselves as Palestinian citizens of Israel rather than as Israeli Arabs. The Council on Foreign Relations also states that most members of the Israeli Arab community prefer this term. The Washington Post asserted in 2021 that "surveys showed" that Israeli Arabs preferred the term "Palestinian citizen of Israel" and that "for people who often feel caught between two worlds, however, the contours of what it means to be a Palestinian citizen of Israel remain a work in progress." However, these findings conflict with a 2017 Tel Aviv University poll which showed most Israelis self-identify as either Arab-Israeli or simply Israeli.

Similar terms that Israeli Arabs, media and other organizations may use are Palestinian Arabs in Israel and Israeli Palestinian Arabs. Amnesty reports that "Arab citizens of Israel" is "an inclusive term used by Israel that describes a number of different and primarily Arabic-speaking groups, including Muslim Arabs", Christian Arabs, Druze and Circassians. They further stated that "considering the number of those defined as Muslim Arabs and Christian Arabs together, the population of Palestinian citizens of Israel amounted to around 1.8 million" in 2019.

There are at least two terms which specifically exclude the East Jerusalem Arab population and the Druze and other Arabs in the Golan Heights: the Arabs inside the Green Line, and the Arabs within (Arabic: عرب الداخل, romanized: ‘Arab al-Dākhil). These terms clarify that

- Although Israel annexed East Jerusalem in 1967, the vast majority of its Arab population does not have Israeli citizenship
- Although Israel annexed the Golan Heights, that area was originally part of Syria, not Mandatory Palestine.

==== Identification as Palestinian ====
While known officially by the Israeli government only as "Israeli Arabs" or "Arab Israelis", the development of Palestinian nationalism and identity in the 20th and 21st centuries has been met by a marked evolution in self-identification, reflecting a rising identification with Palestinian identity alongside Arab and Israeli signifiers. A number of Palestinian citizens of Israel have family ties to Palestinians in the West Bank and Gaza Strip as well as to Palestinian refugees in Jordan, Syria and Lebanon.

Between 1948 and 1967, few Arab citizens of Israel identified openly as "Palestinian", and an "Israeli-Arab" identity, the preferred phrase of the Israeli establishment and public, was predominant. Public expressions of Palestinian identity, such as displays of the Palestinian flag or the singing and reciting of nationalist songs or poetry were illegal. With the end of military administrative rule in 1966 and following the 1967 war, national consciousness and its expression among Israel's Arab citizens spread. A majority then self-identified as Palestinian, preferring this descriptor to Israeli Arab in numerous surveys over the years. In a 2017 telephone poll, 40% of Arab citizens of Israel identified as "Arab in Israel / Arab citizen of Israel", 15% identified as "Palestinian", 8.9% as "Palestinian in Israel / Palestinian citizen of Israel", and 8.7% as "Arab"; the focus groups associated with the poll provided a different outcome, in which "there was consensus that Palestinian identity occupies a central place in their consciousness". A November 2023 poll asked respondents from this demographic what the most important "component in their personal identity" was to them; 33 percent answered "Israeli citizenship", 32 percent "Arab identity", 23 percent "religious affiliation", and 8 percent "Palestinian identity".

University of Haifa professor Sammy Smooha commented in 2019, "The largest now and the most growing identity is a hybrid identity, which is 'Palestinian in Israel' or a similar combination. I think that’s what’s going to take over."

===== Distinction of Druze and Circassian citizens =====
In the Amnesty International 2022 report "Israel's Apartheid against Palestinians: Cruel System of Domination and Crime against Humanity", the organization excludes the Israeli Arab Druze and non-Arab Circassians from the term Palestinian Arab citizens of Israel:

- The Israeli Ministry of Foreign Affairs officially classifies the roughly 2.1 million Palestinian citizens of Israel as "Arab citizens of Israel", reflecting their attributing a racialized non-Jewish, Arab status to all of them
- The term "Arab citizens of Israel" includes Muslim Arabs including Bedouins, Christian Arabs, the 20–25,000 Druze, and even the 4–5,000 Circassians, whose origins are in the Caucasus but are mostly Muslim.
- According to Amnesty, the Israeli state views and treats Palestinian citizens of Israel differently from the Druze and Circassians, who must for example serve in the army while Palestinian citizens need not serve.
- Nonetheless, Israeli authorities and media refer to those who self-identify as Palestinians – as "Israeli Arabs".

The Washington Post included the Druze among the Palestinians. The Council of Foreign Relations stated:"The majority of Arab citizens are Sunni Muslims, though there are many Christians and also Druze, who more often embrace Israeli identity."

==== Identification as Arab Israeli ====
The question of Palestinian identity extends to representation in the Israeli Knesset. Journalist Ruth Margalit says of Mansour Abbas of the United Arab List, a member of the governing coalition, "The traditional term for this group, Arab Israelis, is increasingly controversial, but it's the one that Abbas prefers." Abbas gave an interview to Israeli media in November 2021 and said "My rights don't just come from my citizenship. My rights also come from being a member of the Palestinian people, a son of this Palestinian homeland. And whether we like it or not, the State of Israel, with its identity, was established inside the Palestinian homeland." Sami Abu Shehadeh of Balad is "an outspoken advocate of Palestinian identity". He says, referring to the 2021 Israel–Palestine crisis, "... If the past weeks provided lessons for the international community, then a main one is that they cannot continue to ignore the Palestinian citizens of Israel. Any solution should include full equality for all citizens as well as the respect and recognition of our rights as a national minority."

=== Israeli surveys ===
Surveys of Arab-Israeli self-identification are diverse, and have often presented differing if not contradictory results. In 2017 the Konrad Adenauer Foundation's Program for Jewish-Arab Cooperation at the Moshe Dayan Center for Middle Eastern and African Studies at Tel Aviv University conducted a telephone poll, in which the results were:

- National identity with Israeli civil component 49.7%, of which
  - Palestinian (citizen) of Israel 8.9%
  - Arab (citizen) of Israel 40.8%
- Pure national identity 24.1%, of which
  - Palestinian 15.4%
  - Arab 8.7%
- Civil identity: Israeli 11.4%
- Religious identity 9.5%
- Other / Don't know 5.3%

The focus groups associated with the poll provided a different outcome, in which "there was consensus that Palestinian identity occupies a central place in their consciousness". reflecting "the strength of Palestinian-Arab identity", and that they do not see a contradiction between that and Israeli civic identity. The focus group revealed strong opposition to the term "Israeli-Arab" and to the concept of Israel's "Independence Day". The study concluded that the focus group findings of strong Palestinian national identity, not conflicting with Israeli civic identity, match those seen in the public sphere.

According to a 2019 survey by University of Haifa professor Sammy Smooha, conducted in Arabic among 718 Arab adults, 47% of the Arab population chose Palestinian identities with an Israeli component ("Israeli Palestinian", "Palestinian in Israel", "Palestinian Arab in Israel"), 36% prefers Israeli Arab identities without a Palestinian component ("Israeli", "Arab", "Arab in Israel", "Israeli Arab"), and 15% chose Palestinian identities without an Israeli component ("Palestinian", "Palestinian Arab"). When these two components are presented as competitors, 69% chose exclusive or primary Palestinian identity, compared with 30% who chose exclusive or primary Israeli Arab identity. 66% of the Arab population agreed that "the identity of 'Palestinian Arab in Israel' is appropriate to most Arabs in Israel."

According to a 2020 survey by Camil Fuchs of Tel-Aviv University, 51% of Arabs identify as Arab-Israeli, 7% identify as Palestinian, 23% identify as Israeli, 15% identify as Arab, and 4% identify as "other." This significantly differs from their 2019 survey, in which 49% identified as Arab-Israeli, 18% as Palestinian, 27% as Arab, and 5% as Israeli.

=== Academic practice ===
Common practice in contemporary academic literature is to identify this community as Palestinian as it is how the majority self-identify (See Self-Identification for more). Terms preferred by most Arab citizens to identify themselves include Palestinians, Palestinians in Israel, Israeli Palestinians, the Palestinians of 1948, Palestinian Arabs, Palestinian Arab citizens of Israel or Palestinian citizens of Israel. There are, however, individuals from among the Arab citizenry who reject the term Palestinian altogether. A minority of Israel's Arab citizens include "Israeli" in some way in their self-identifying label; the majority identify as Palestinian by nationality and Israeli by citizenship.

=== Israeli establishment ===
The Israeli establishment prefers Israeli Arabs or Arabs in Israel, and also uses the terms the minorities, the Arab sector, Arabs of Israel and Arab citizens of Israel. These labels have been criticized for denying this population a political or national identification, obscuring their Palestinian identity and connection to Palestine. The term Israeli Arabs in particular is viewed as a construct of the Israeli authorities. It is nonetheless used by a significant minority of the Arab population, "reflecting its dominance in Israeli social discourse."

=== Historical ===
Between 1920 and 1948, in what was then Mandatory Palestine, all citizens were known as Palestinians, and the two primary communities were referred to by the British authorities as "Arabs" and "Jews". Between 1948 and 1967, few citizens of Israel identified openly as "Palestinian". An "Israeli-Arab" identity, the preferred phrase of the Israeli establishment and public, was predominant. Public expressions of Palestinian identity, such as displays of the Palestinian flag or the singing and reciting of nationalist songs or poetry were illegal. Ever since the 1948 Nakba, the Palestinians that have remained within the 1949 Armistice borders have been colloquially known as "48 Arabs" (Arabic: عرب ٤٨, romanized: ʿArab Thamāniya wa-ʾArbaʿīn). With the end of military administrative rule in 1966 and following the 1967 war, national consciousness and its expression among Israel's Arab citizens spread. A majority then self-identified as Palestinian, preferring this descriptor to Israeli Arab in numerous surveys over the years.

=== East Jerusalem and Golan Heights ===
Arabs in East Jerusalem and the Golan Heights (Syrian Golan) are special cases regarding citizenship and identity.

Arabs living in East Jerusalem, occupied and administered by Israel since the Six-Day War of 1967 hold Israeli ID cards, but most are non-citizen permanent residents since few accepted Israel's offer of citizenship after the war's end, refusing to recognize its sovereignty, and most maintain close ties with the West Bank. As permanent residents, they are eligible to vote in Jerusalem's municipal elections, although only a small percentage takes advantage of this right.

The Golan Heights was not part of Mandatory Palestine or the Ottoman political units which preceded it, but rather was part of Syria, and the UN still recognizes it as such, and calls it the Syrian Golan. The remaining Druze population of the Golan Heights, occupied and administered by Israel in 1967, are considered permanent residents under Israel's Golan Heights Law of 1981. As of mid-2022, 4,303 Druze citizens of Syria have been granted Israeli citizenship, or, 20% of the total Druze residents in the Golan Heights. In 2024, Rami Zeedan estimated that approximately 25% have Israeli citizenship.

== History ==
=== 1948 Arab–Israeli War ===
Most Jewish Israelis refer to the 1948 Arab–Israeli War as the War of Independence, while most Arab citizens refer to it as al-Nakba (the catastrophe), a reflection of differences in perception of the purpose and outcomes of the war.

In the aftermath of the 1947–49 war, the territory previously administered by the British Empire as Mandatory Palestine was de facto divided into three parts: the State of Israel, the Jordanian-held West Bank, and the Egyptian-held Gaza Strip. Of the estimated 950,000 Arabs that lived in the territory that became Israel before the war, over 80% fled or were expelled. The other 20%, some 156,000, remained. Some of them supported Israel from the beginning. Arab citizens of Israel today are largely composed of the people who remained and their descendants. Others include some from the Gaza Strip and the West Bank who procured Israeli citizenship under family-unification provisions made significantly more stringent in the aftermath of the Second Intifada.

Arabs who left their homes during the period of armed conflict, but remained in what had become Israeli territory, were considered to be "present absentees". In some cases, they were refused permission to return to their homes, which were expropriated and turned over to state ownership, as was the property of other Palestinian refugees. Some 274,000, or 1 of every 4 Arab citizens of Israel are "present absentees" or internally displaced Palestinians. Notable cases of "present absentees" include the residents of Saffuriyya and the Galilee villages of Kafr Bir'im and Iqrit.

=== 1949–1966 ===
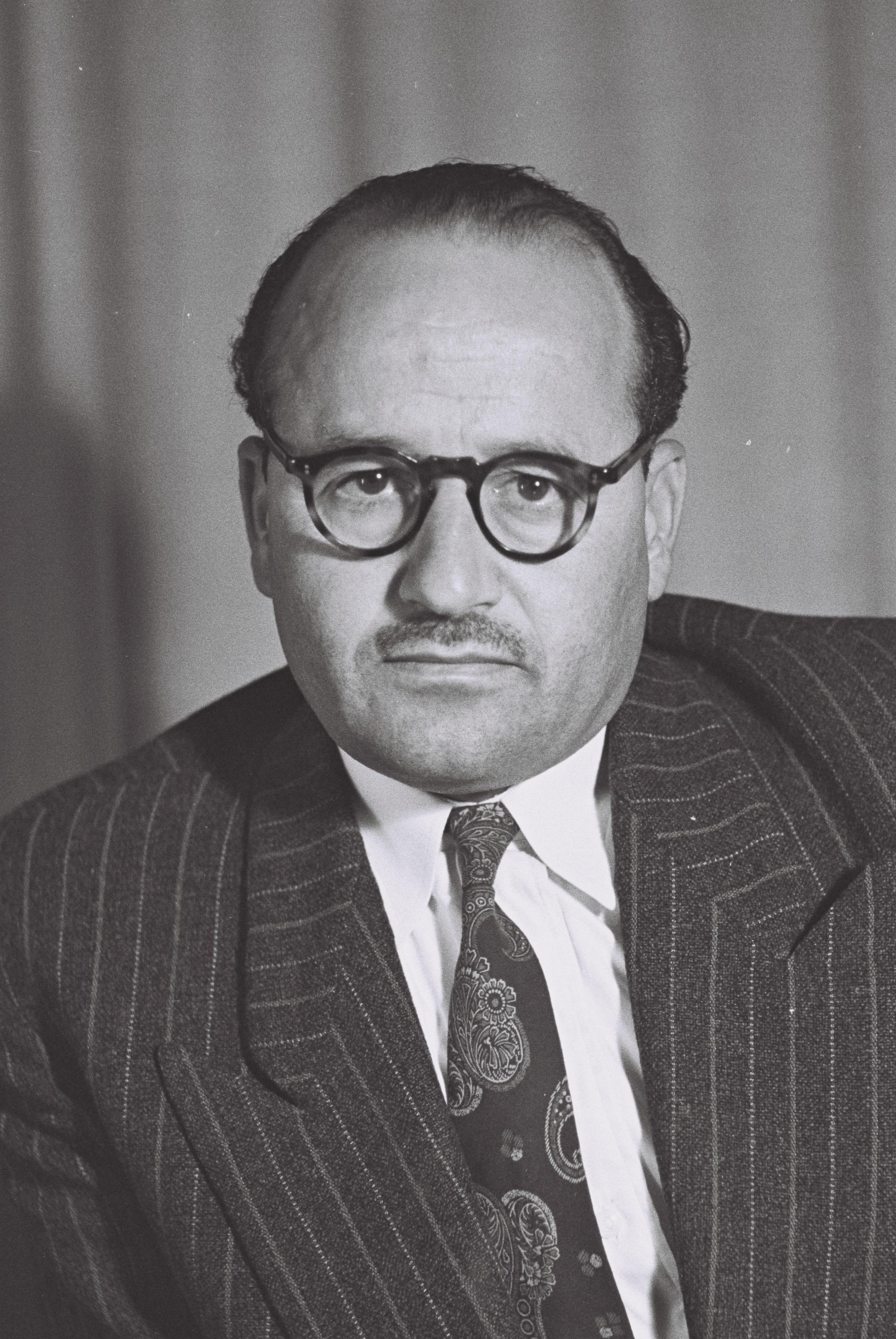
Seif el-Din el-Zubi, member of the first Knesset

Between Israel's declaration of independence on 14 May 1948 and the Israeli Nationality Law of 14 July 1952, there technically were no Israeli citizens.

While most Arabs remaining in Israel were granted citizenship, they were subject to martial law in the early years of the state. Zionism had given little serious thought as to how to integrate Arabs, and according to Ian Lustick subsequent policies were 'implemented by a rigorous regime of military rule that dominated what remained of the Arab population in territory ruled by Israel, enabling the state to expropriate most Arab-owned land, severely limit its access to investment capital and employment opportunity, and eliminate virtually all opportunities to use citizenship as a vehicle for gaining political influence'. A variety of Israeli legislative measures facilitated the transfer of land abandoned by Arabs to state ownership. These included the Absentee Property Law of 1950 which allowed the state to expropriate the property of Palestinians who fled or were expelled to other countries, and the Land Acquisition Law of 1953 which authorized the Ministry of Finance to transfer expropriated land to the state. Other common legal expedients included the use of emergency regulations to declare land belonging to Arab citizens a closed military zone, followed by the use of Ottoman legislation on abandoned land to take control of the land. Travel permits, curfews, administrative detentions, and expulsions were part of life until 1966.

Arabs who held Israeli citizenship were entitled to vote for the Israeli Knesset. Arab Knesset members have served in office since the First Knesset in 1949. The first Arab Knesset members were Amin-Salim Jarjora and Seif el-Din el-Zoubi who were members of the Democratic List of Nazareth party and Tawfik Toubi, member of the Maki party.

In 1965 a radical independent Arab group called al-Ard forming the Arab Socialist List tried to run for Knesset elections. The list was banned by the Israeli Central Elections Committee.

In 1966, martial law was lifted completely, and the government set about dismantling most of the discriminatory laws, while Arab citizens were granted the same rights as Jewish citizens under law.

=== 1967–2000 ===
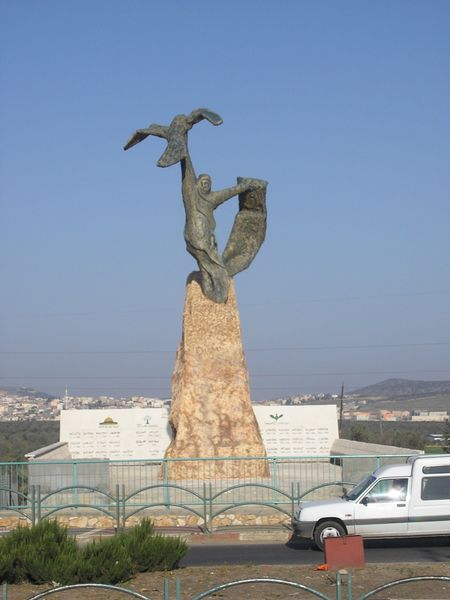
A monument to residents of Arraba killed in the Arab–Israeli conflict

After the 1967 Six-Day War, Arab citizens were able to contact Palestinians in the West Bank and Gaza Strip for the first time since the establishment of the state. This, along with the lifting of military rule, led to increased political activism among Arab citizens.

In 1974, a committee of Arab mayors and municipal councilmen was established which played an important role in representing the community and pressuring the Israeli government. This was followed in 1975 by the formation of the Committee for the Defense of the Land, which sought to prevent continuing land expropriations. That same year, a political breakthrough took place with the election of Arab poet Tawfiq Ziad, a Maki member, as mayor of Nazareth, accompanied by a strong communist presence in the town council. In 1976, six Arab citizens of Israel were killed by Israeli security forces at a protest against land expropriations and house demolitions. The date of the protest, 30 March, has since been commemorated annually as Land Day.

The 1980s saw the birth of the Islamic Movement. As part of a larger trend in the Arab World, the movement emphasized moving Islam into the political realm. They built schools, provided other essential social services, constructed mosques, and encouraged prayer and conservative Islamic dress. The Islamic Movement began to affect electoral politics particularly at the local level.

Many Arab citizens supported the First Intifada and assisted Palestinians in the West Bank and Gaza, providing them with money, food, and clothes. A number of strikes were also held by Arab citizens in solidarity with Palestinians in the occupied territories.

The years leading up to the Oslo Accords were a time of optimism for Arab citizens. During the administration of Yitzhak Rabin, Arab parties played an important role in the formation of a governing coalition. Increased participation of Arab citizens was also seen at the civil society level. However, tension continued to exist with multiple Arabs calling for Israel to become a "state of all its citizens", thereby challenging the state's Jewish identity. In the 1999 elections for prime minister, 94% of the Arab electorate voted for Ehud Barak. However, Barak formed a broad left-right-center government without consulting the Arab parties, disappointing the Arab community.

=== 2000–present ===
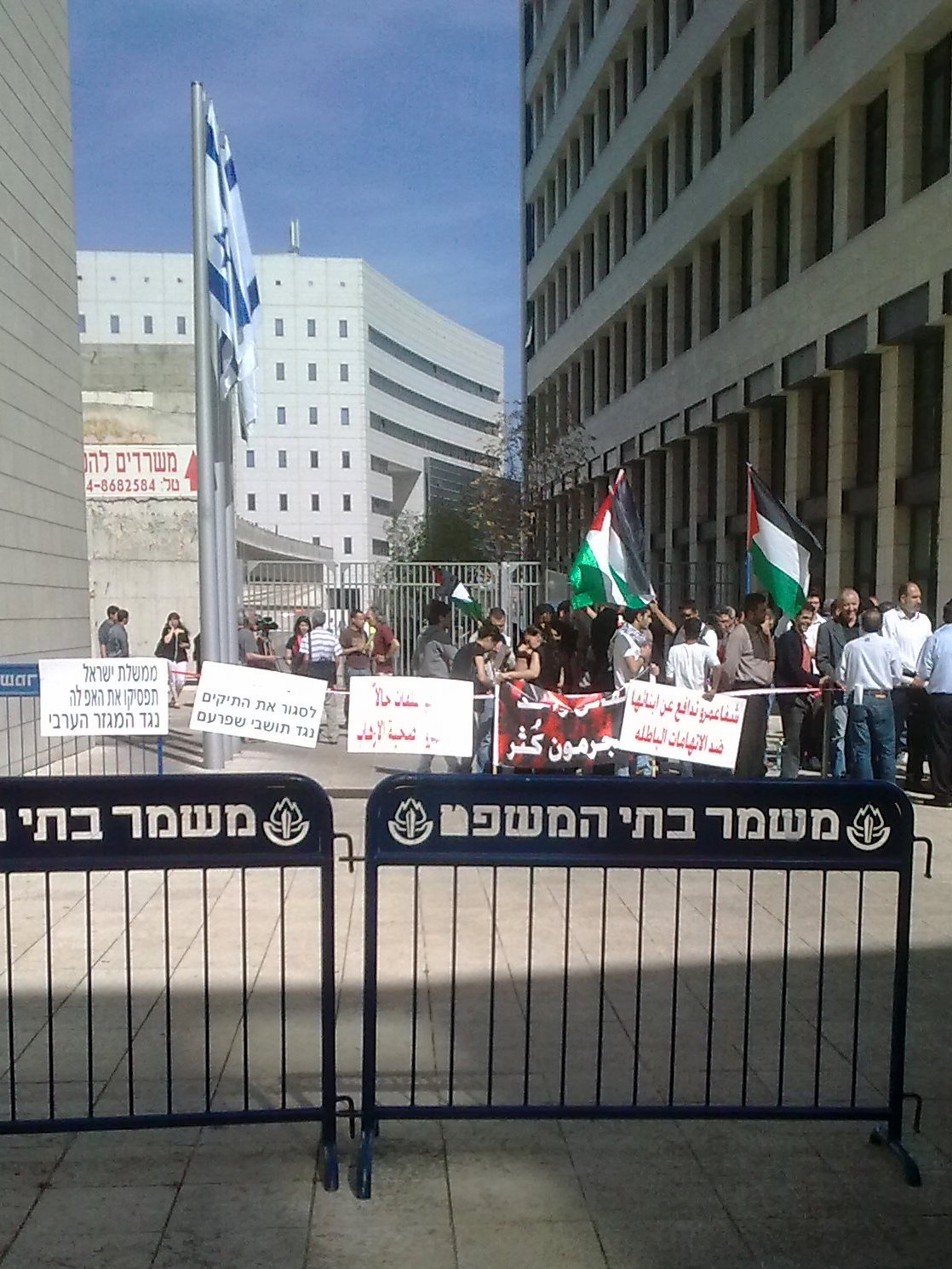
Arab Israelis from Shefa-'Amr demonstrating in front of the Haifa court building with Palestinian flags

Tensions between Arabs and the state rose in October 2000 when 12 Arab citizens and one man from Gaza were killed while protesting the government's response to the Second Intifada. In response to this incident, the government established the Or Commission. The events of October 2000 caused multiple Arabs to question the nature of their Israeli citizenship. To a large extent, they boycotted the 2001 Israeli Elections as a means of protest. This boycott helped Ariel Sharon defeat Ehud Barak; as aforementioned, in the 1999 elections, 94 percent of Israel's Arab minority had voted for Ehud Barak. IDF enlistment by Bedouin citizens of Israel dropped significantly.

During the 2006 Lebanon War, Arab advocacy organizations complained that the Israeli government had invested time and effort to protect Jewish citizens from Hezbollah attacks, but had neglected Arab citizens. They pointed to a dearth of bomb shelters in Arab towns and villages and a lack of basic emergency information in Arabic. Multiple Israeli Jews viewed the Arab opposition to government policy and sympathy with the Lebanese as a sign of disloyalty.

In October 2006, tensions rose when Israeli Prime Minister Ehud Olmert invited a right-wing political party Yisrael Beiteinu, to join his coalition government. The party leader, Avigdor Lieberman, advocated an ethnicity-based territory exchange, the Lieberman Plan, by transferring heavily populated Arab areas (mainly the Triangle), to Palestinian Authority control and annexing major Jewish Israeli settlement blocs in the West Bank close to the green line as part of a peace proposal. Arabs who would prefer to remain in Israel instead of becoming citizens of a Palestinian state would be able to move to Israel. All citizens of Israel, whether Jews or Arabs, would be required to pledge an oath of allegiance to retain citizenship. Those who refuse could remain in Israel as permanent residents.

In January 2007 the first non-Druze Arab minister in Israel's history, Raleb Majadele, was appointed minister without portfolio (Salah Tarif, a Druze, had been appointed a minister without portfolio in 2001). The appointment was criticized by the left, which felt it was an attempt to cover up the Labor Party's decision to sit with Yisrael Beiteinu in the government, and by the right, who saw it as a threat to Israel's status as a Jewish state. In 2021, Mansour Abbas, the leader of the United Arab List, made history by becoming the first Israeli Arab political leader to join an Israeli governing coalition.

During the 2021 Israel–Palestine crisis widespread protests and riots intensified across Israel, particularly in cities with large Arab populations. In Lod, rocks were thrown at Jewish apartments and some Jewish residents were evacuated from their homes by the police. Synagogues and a Muslim cemetery were vandalized. Communal violence including "riots, stabbings, arson, attempted home invasions and shootings" was reported from Beersheba, Rahat, Ramla, Lod, Nasiriyah, Tiberias, Jerusalem, Haifa and Acre.

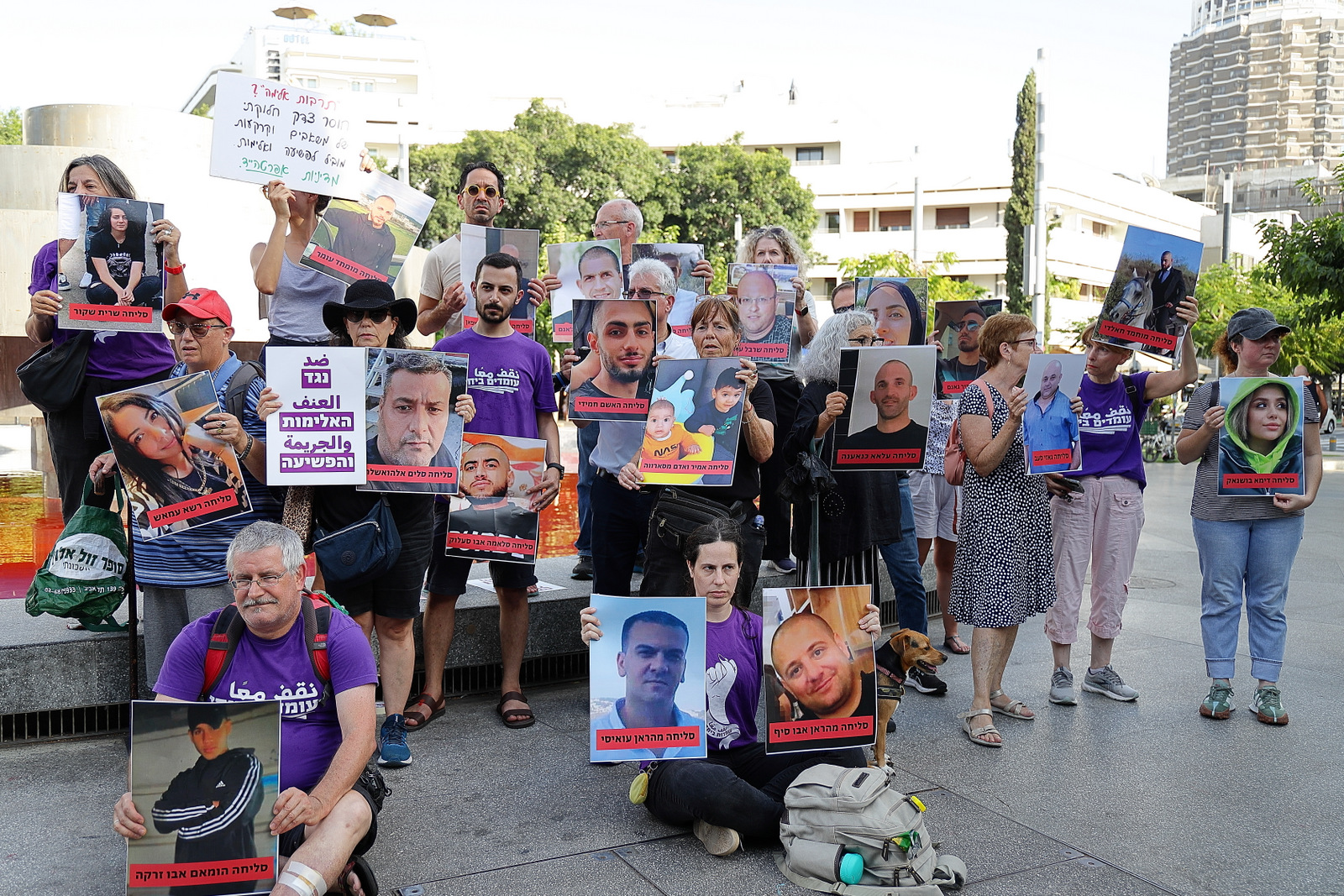
A protest against the killings in the Arab community in Tel Aviv

The Arab community in Israel has seen a significant increase in violence and organized crime, including a rise in gang-related murders in recent years. A report by the Abraham Initiative highlighted that 244 Arab community members were killed in Israel in 2023, more than double the previous year's count. The report attributed this surge in homicides directly to National Security Minister Itamar Ben Gvir, who campaigned on a platform promising to improve personal security and oversees law enforcement. Prominent organized crime families among Israeli Arabs include Al-Hariri, Bakri, Jarushis, and the Druze Abu Latifs.

Since the outbreak of the Gaza war, Israel has carried out mass arrests and detentions of Palestinian workers and Arab citizens of Israel. On 5 November 2023, CNN reported that "dozens" of Palestinian residents and Arab Israelis were arrested in Israel for expressions of solidarity with the civilian population of Gaza, sharing Quran verses, or expressing "any support for the Palestinian people". Haaretz described the widespread targeting of Arab Israelis by Israeli security forces. Referring to "hundreds" of interrogations, El País reported on 11 November that Israel increasingly treats its Arab minority as a "potential fifth column". At the same time, the war saw an increased self-identification with Israel among Arab citizens and continued cooperation with their Jewish counterparts in various areas, including healthcare, military service, education and sports. Since the war, a strong majority of Arab Israelis reported fears about their personal or economic security, although most also reported no changes in their relationships with Jewish friends or acquaintances. A majority of Israeli Arabs condemned the 7 October attacks and follow instructions from the Home Front Command, but at the same time also have less favorable views on the war and hold diverse views on governance in post-war Gaza. Multiple figures from the community expressed general resentment over the war, as other Palestinians regarded them as supporters of Israel, whereas Israeli Jews saw them as potential Hamas supporters.

== Sectarian and religious groupings ==
Religions adhered to by Arab citizens of Israel
Muslim	82%
Christian	9%
Druze	9%

In 2006, the official number of Arab residents in Israel – including East Jerusalem and Golan Heights permanent residents some of whom are not citizens – was 1,413,500 people, about 20% of Israel's population. The Arab population in 2023 was estimated at 2,065,000, representing 21% of the country's population. According to the Israel Central Bureau of Statistics (May 2003), Muslims, including Bedouins, make up 82% of the entire Arab population in Israel, along with around 9% Druze, and 9% Christians. Projections based on 2010 data, predicted that Arab Israelis would constitute 25% of Israel's population by 2025.

The national language and mother tongue of Arab citizens, including the Druze, is Arabic and the colloquial spoken language is of the Palestinian Arabic dialect. Knowledge and command of Modern Standard Arabic varies.

=== Muslims ===
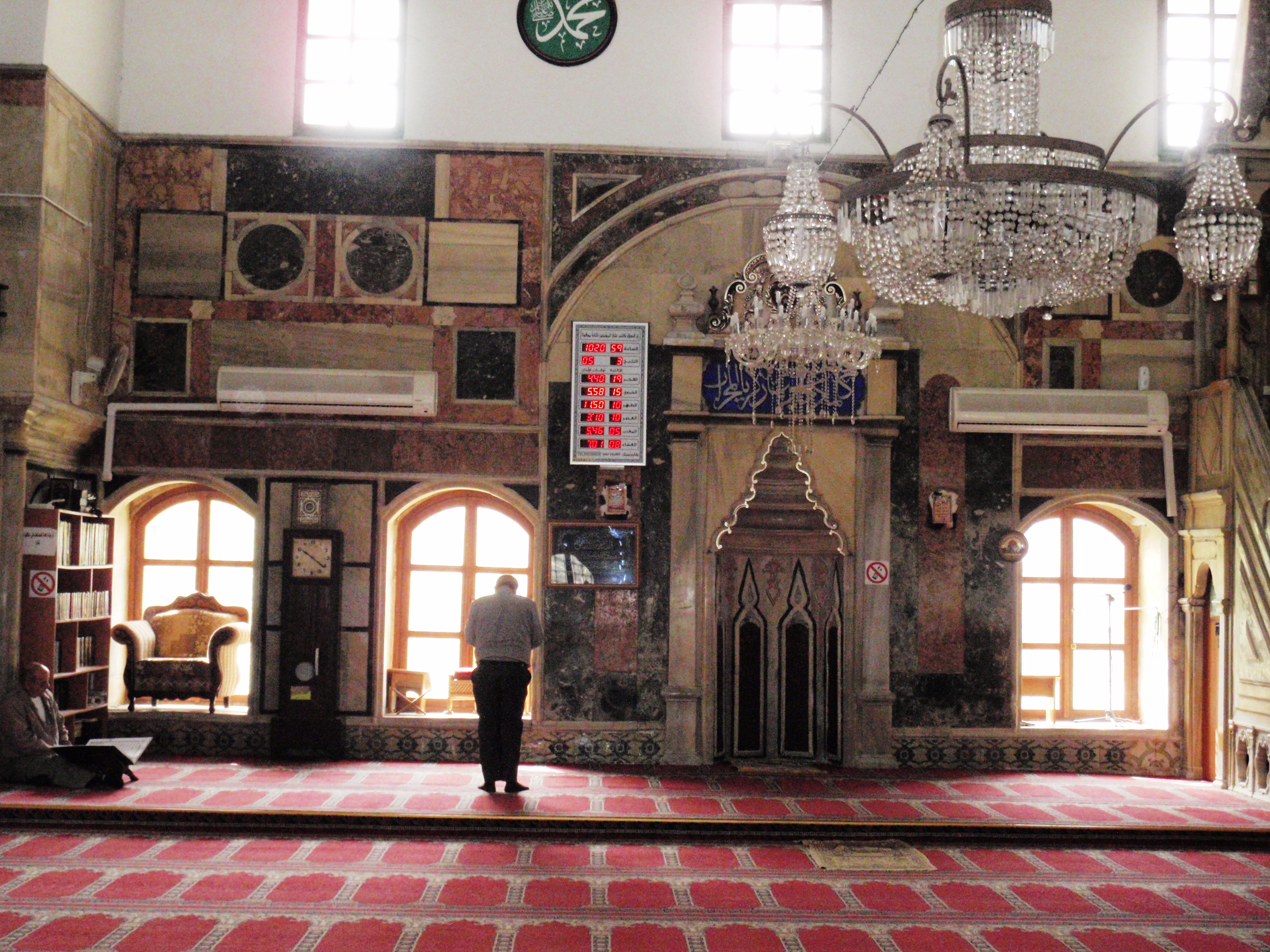
Muslim performs prayers in El-Jazzar Mosque.

Muslims comprise 17.9% of the Israeli population in 2019. The majority of Muslims in Israel are Sunni Arabs, with an Ahmadiyya minority. There are around 4,000 Alawites in Israel and the majority of them live in Ghajar village in the occupied Golan Heights near the border with Lebanon. The Bedouin in Israel are also Arab Muslims, with some Bedouin clans participating in the Israeli army. The small Circassian community is composed of Sunni Muslims uprooted from the North Caucasus in the late 19th century. In addition, smaller populations of Kurdish, Romani and Turkish Muslims also live in Israel.

In 2020, Jerusalem hosted the largest Muslim population in Israel, numbering 346,000 residents, constituting 21.1% of Israel's Muslim population and about 36.9% of the city's total residents. Rahat followed with the second-largest Muslim population at 71,300 residents, while Umm Al-Fahm and Nazareth had approximately 56,000 and 55,600 residents, respectively. The eleven towns of the Triangle area are home to approximately 250,000 Israeli Muslims.

Regarding regional distribution in 2020, approximately 35.2% of Israeli Muslims resided in the Northern District, 21.9% in the Jerusalem District, 17.1% in the Central District, 13.7% in the Haifa District, 10.9% in the Southern District, and 1.2% in the Tel Aviv District. The Israeli Muslim population is notably youthful: about 33.4% are aged 14 and under, while those aged 65 and older account for only 4.3%. Furthermore, the Muslim community in Israel boasts the highest fertility rate among religious groups, standing at 3.16 children per woman.

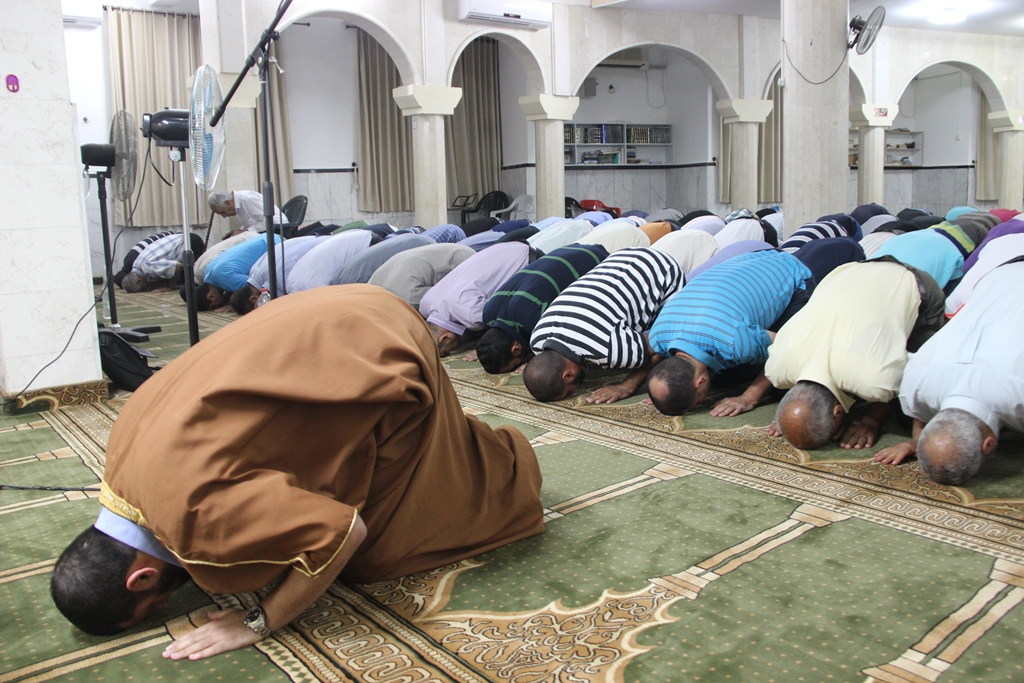
Worshipers in one of the mosques in Umm al-Fahm

According to study published by Pew Research Center in 2016, while Muslims living in Israel, overall, are more religious than Israeli Jews, they are less religious than Muslims living in other countries in the Middle East. Muslim women are more likely to say that religion has high importance in their lives, and younger Muslims are generally less observant than their elders. According to the Israel Democracy Institute survey conducted in 2015, 47% of Israeli Muslims identified as traditional, 32% identified as religious, 17% identified as not religious at all, 3% identified as very religious.

==== Settled ====
Traditionally settled communities of Muslim Arabs comprise about 70% of the Arab population in Israel. In 2010, the average number of children per mother was 3.84, dropping from 3.97 in 2008. The Muslim population is mostly young: 42% of Muslims are under the age of 15. The median age of Muslim Israelis is 18, while the median age of Jewish Israelis is 30. The percentage of people over 65 is less than 3% for Muslims, compared with 12% for the Jewish population.

==== Bedouin ====
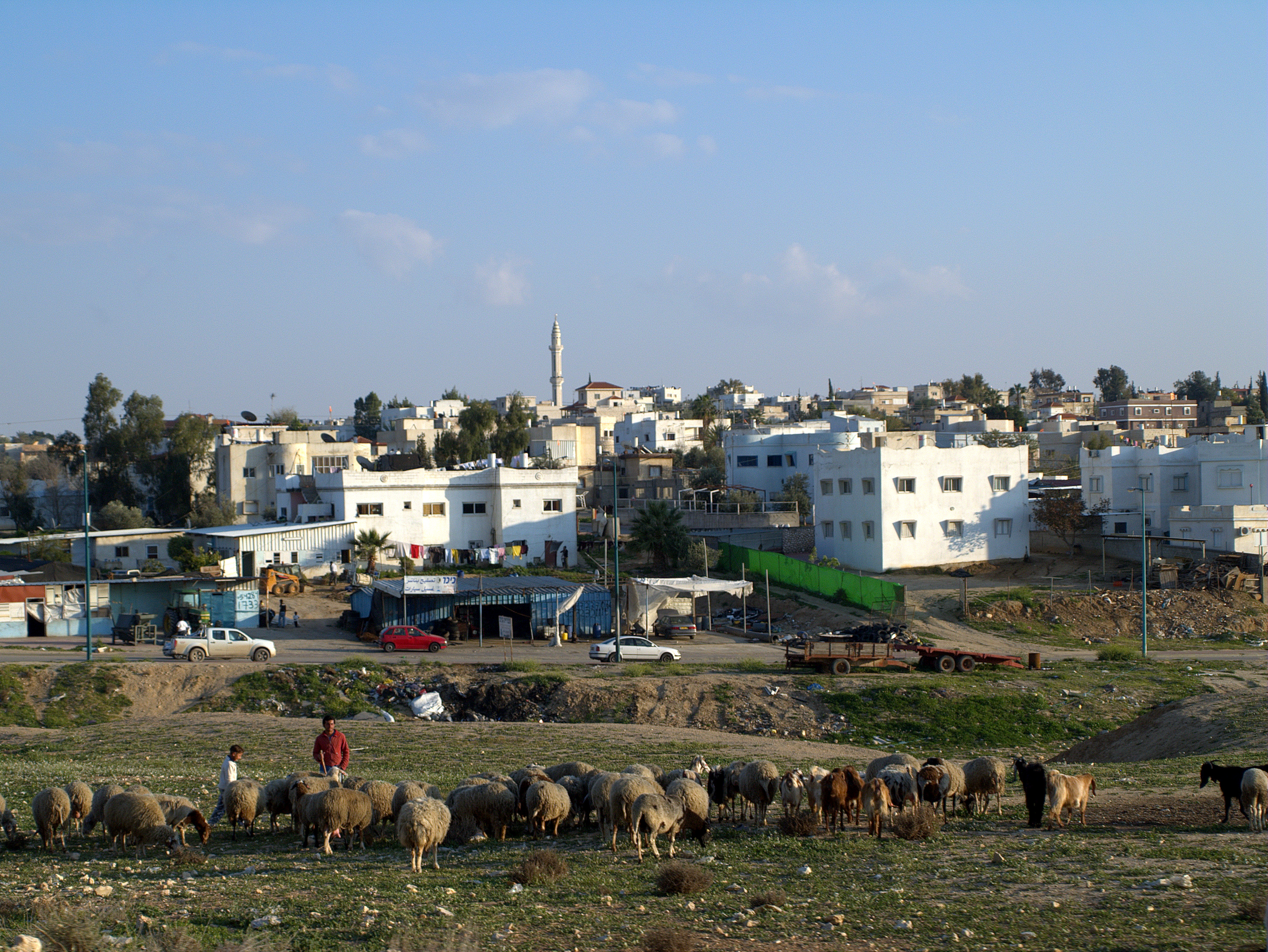
Rahat, the largest Bedouin city in the Negev

According to the Foreign Affairs Minister of Israel, 110,000 Bedouins live in the Negev, 50,000 in the Galilee, and 10,000 in the central region of Israel.

Prior to the establishment of Israel in 1948, there were an estimated 65,000–90,000 Bedouin living in the Negev. The 11,000 who remained were relocated by the Israeli government in the 1950s and 1960s to an area in the northeastern Negev comprising 10% of the Negev desert. The Israeli government built seven development towns for the Bedouin between 1979 and 1982. Around half the Bedouin population live in these towns, the largest of which is the city of Rahat, others being Ar'arat an-Naqab (Ar'ara BaNegev), Bir Hadaj, Hura, Kuseife, Lakiya, Shaqib al-Salam (Segev Shalom) and Tel as-Sabi (Tel Sheva). In 2005, Bedouin were estimated to amount to 10% of the Arab citizens of Israel. Approximately 40–50% of Bedouin citizens of Israel live in 39–45 unrecognized villages that are not connected to the electrical grid and water mains. A study published by the Taub Center for Social Policy Studies in 2017 found that Bedouins have the lowest achievements in the Arab sector on all indices: bagrut scores, rates of college graduates, and fields of employment. As they tend to be the least educated.

=== Druze ===
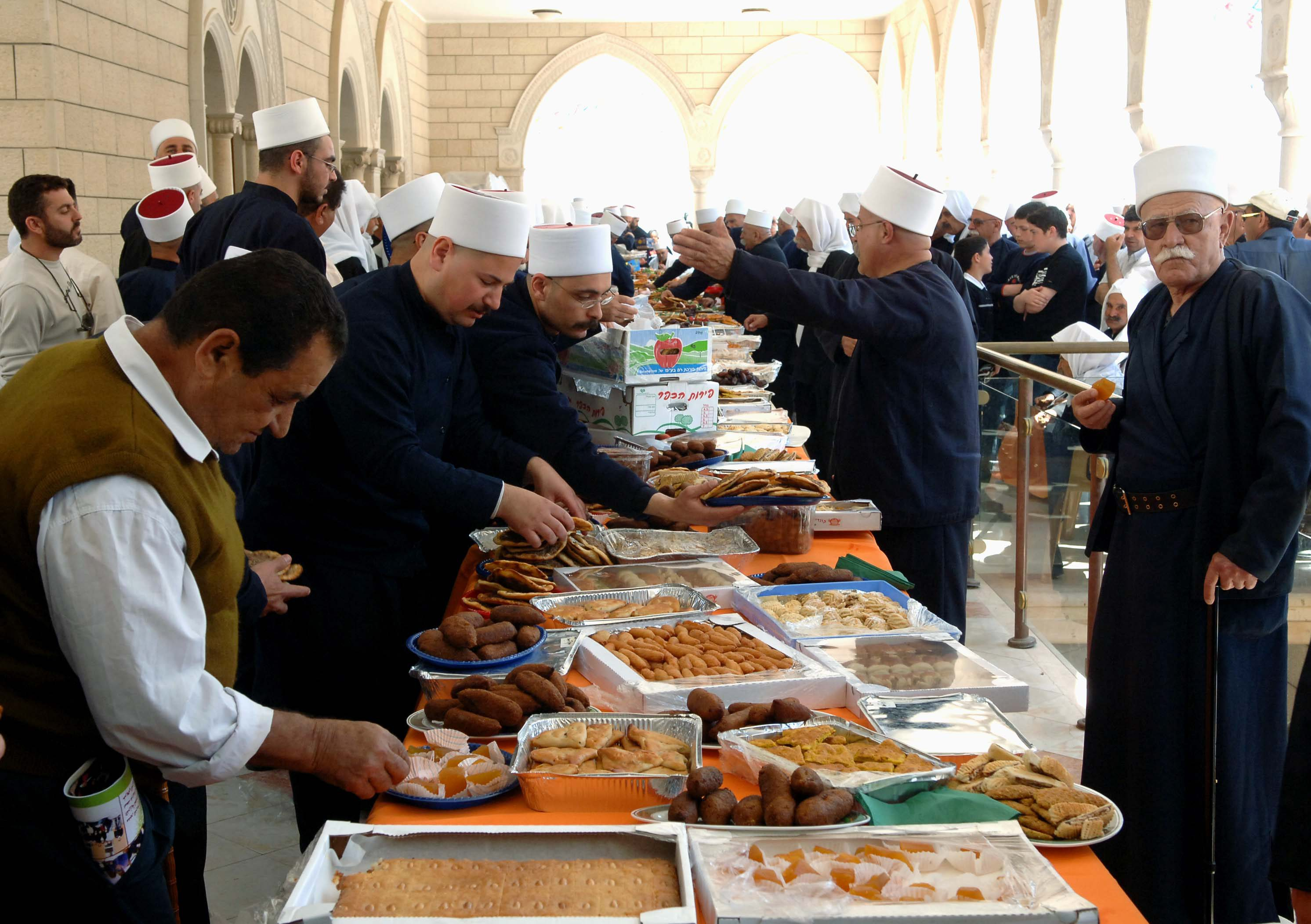
Druze dignitaries celebrating the Ziyarat al-Nabi Shu'ayb festival at the tomb of the prophet in Hittin

Most Israeli Druze reside in the northern part of the country and are officially recognized as a separate religious community with their own courts. They maintain Arabic language and culture as integral parts of their identity, and Arabic is their primary language. The Galilean Druze and Druze of the Haifa region received Israeli citizenship automatically in 1948. After Israel captured the Golan Heights from Syria in 1967 and annexed it to Israel in 1981, the Druze of the Golan Heights were offered full Israeli citizenship under the Golan Heights Law. Most declined Israeli citizenship and retain Syrian citizenship and identity and are treated as permanent residents of Israel. As of 2011, fewer than 10% of the Druze population in the Golan Heights had accepted Israeli citizenship.

At the end of 2019, approximately 81% of the Israeli Druze population lived in the Northern District and 19% lived in the Haifa District, and the largest population of Druze were Daliyat al-Karmel and Yirka. Israeli Druze live in 19 towns and villages, either singly or mixed with Christians and Muslims, all located on the tops of the mountains in northern Israel (Upper and Lower Galilee and Mount Carmel), including Abu Snan, Beit Jann, Daliyat al-Karmel, Ein al-Asad, Hurfeish, Isfiya, Julis, Kafr Yasif, Kisra-Sumei, Maghar, Peki'in, Rameh, Sajur, Shefa-Amr, Yanuh-Jat, and Yarka. There are four remaining Druze villages in the Israeli-annexed portion of the Golan Heights—Majdal Shams, Mas'ade, Buq'ata, and Ein Qiniyye—in which 23,000 Druze live.

During the British Mandate for Palestine, the Druze did not embrace the rising Arab nationalism of the time or participate in violent confrontations. In 1948, multiple Druze volunteered for the Israeli army and no Druze villages were destroyed or permanently abandoned. Since the establishment of the state, the Druze have demonstrated solidarity with Israel and distanced themselves from Arab and Islamic radicalism. Male Druze citizens serve in the Israel Defense Forces.

From 1957, the Israeli government formally recognized the Druze as a separate religious community, and are defined as a distinct ethnic group in the Israeli Ministry of Interior's census registration. On the other hand, the Israel Central Bureau of Statistics categorizes Druze as Arabs in their census. While the Israeli education system is basically divided into Hebrew and Arabic speaking schools, the Druze have autonomy within the Arabic speaking branch. Israeli Druze are Arabic in language and culture, and their mother tongue is the Arabic Language.

Some scholars maintain that Israel has tried to separate the Druze from other Arab communities, and that the effort has influenced the way Israel's Druze perceive their modern identity. Survey data suggests that Israeli Druze prioritize their identity first as Druze (religiously), second as Arabs (culturally and ethnically), and third as Israelis (citizenship-wise). A small minority of them identify as Palestinians, distinguishing them from the majority of other Arab citizens of Israel, who predominantly identify as Palestinians.

In a survey conducted in 2008 by Dr. Yusuf Hassan of Tel Aviv University 94% of Druze respondents identified as "Druze-Israelis" in the religious and national context, while a 2017 Pew Research Center poll reported that while 99% of Muslims and 96% of Christians identified as ethnically Arab, a smaller share of Druze, 71%, identified likewise. Compared to other Christians and Muslims, Druze place less emphasis on their Arab identity and self-identify more as Israeli. Most do not identify as Palestinians. However, they were less ready for personal relationships with Jews compared to Israeli Muslims and Christians. Scholars attribute this trend to cultural differences between Jews and Druze. Druze politicians in Israel include Ayoob Kara, who represented Likud in the Knesset; Majalli Wahabi of Kadima, the Deputy Speaker of the Knesset; and Said Nafa of the Arab party Balad.

=== Christians ===
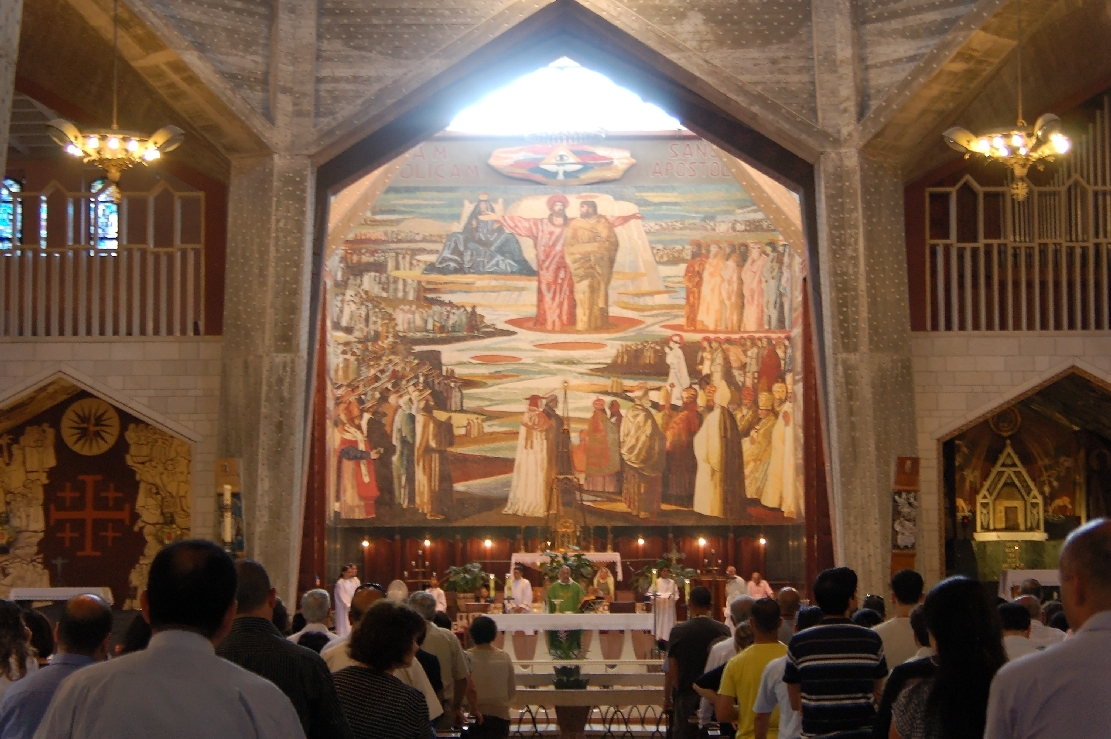
Catholic Mass in the Basilica of the Annunciation in Nazareth, Christian Arabs are one of the most educated ethnoreligious groups in Israel.

Christian Arabs comprise about 9% of the Arab population in Israel. At the end of 2019, approximately 70.6% reside in the Northern District, 13.3% in the Haifa District, 9.5% in the Jerusalem District, 3.4% in the Central District, 2.7% in the Tel Aviv District and 0.5% in the Southern District. There are 135,000 or more Christian Arabs in Israel (and more than 39,000 non-Arab Christians). As of 2014 the Melkite Greek Catholic Church was the largest Christian community in Israel, where about 60% of Israeli Christians belonged to the Melkite Greek Catholic Church, while around 30% of Israeli Christians belonged to the Greek Orthodox Church of Jerusalem. The Christian communities in Israel run numerous schools, colleges, hospitals, clinics, orphanages, homes for the elderly, dormitories, family and youth centers, hotels, and guesthouses.

Nazareth has the largest Christian Arab population, followed by Haifa. The majority of Haifa's Arab minority is Christian as well. The Christian Arab communities in Nazareth and Haifa tend to be wealthier and better educated compare to other Arabs elsewhere in Israel. Arab Christians also live in a number of other localities in the Galilee; such as Abu Snan, Arraba, Bi'ina, Deir Hanna, I'billin, Jadeidi-Makr, Kafr Kanna, Mazra'a, Muqeible, Ras al-Ein, Reineh, Sakhnin, Shefa-Amr, Tur'an and Yafa an-Naseriyye. localities such as Eilabun, Jish, Kafr Yasif and Rameh are predominantly Christians. Nearly all the population of Fassuta and Mi'ilya are Melkite Christians. Some Druze villages, such as Daliyat al-Karmel, Ein Qiniyye, Hurfeish, Isfiya, Kisra-Sumei, Maghar, Majdal Shams and Peki'in have small Christian Arab populations. Mixed cities such as Acre, Jerusalem, Lod, Ma'alot-Tarshiha, Nof HaGalil, Ramla and Tel Aviv-Jaffa have significant Christian Arab populations.

Many Christian Arabs have been prominent in Arab political parties in Israel, and leaders have included Archbishop George Hakim, Emile Toma, Tawfik Toubi, Emile Habibi, and Azmi Bishara. Notable Christian religious figures include the Melkite Archbishops of the Galilee Elias Chacour and Boutros Mouallem, the Latin Patriarch of Jerusalem Michel Sabbah, and Bishop Munib Younan of the Lutheran Church of Jordan and the Holy Land. Israeli Supreme Court judges Salim Joubran and George Karra are Christian Arab. Notable Christian figures in science and high tech include Hossam Haick who has a number of contributions in multidisciplinary fields such as nanotechnology, nanosensors and molecular electronics, and Johny Srouji who is Apple's senior vice president of hardware technologies.

Among Arab Christians in Israel, some emphasize pan-Arabism, whilst a small minority enlists in the Israel Defense Forces. Since September 2014 Christian families or clans who have either Aramaic/Assyrian or Maronite cultural heritage are considered an ethnicity separate from Israeli Arabs and can register themselves as Arameans. This recognition comes after about seven years of activity by the Aramean Christian Foundation in Israel, which rather than sticking to an Arab identity, wishes to assimilate into an Israeli lifestyle. Aram is led by IDF Major Shadi Khalloul Risho and the Israeli Christian Recruitment Forum, headed by Father Gabriel Naddaf of the Greek-Orthodox Church and Major Ihab Shlayan. The move was condemned by the Greek Orthodox Patriarchate, which described it as an attempt to divide the Palestinian minority in Israel. Other pro-Zionist advocates supporting similar ideas received extensive coverage in Israeli state sponsored media and Jewish news outlets to severe criticisms from their co-religionists (see Yoseph Haddad).

Christian Arabs are one of the most educated groups in Israel. Statistically, Christian Arabs in Israel have the highest rates of educational attainment among all religious communities, according to a data by Israel Central Bureau of Statistics in 2010, 63% of Israeli Christian Arabs have had college or postgraduate education, the highest of any religious and ethno-religious group. Despite the fact that Arab Christians only represent 2% of the total Israeli population, in 2014 they accounted for 17% of the country's university students, and for 14% of its college students. There are more Christians who have attained a bachelor's degree or higher academic degrees than the median Israeli population. The rate of students studying in the field of medicine was higher among Christian Arab students than that of all other sectors, and the percentage of Arab Christian women who are receiving higher education is also higher than that of other groups.

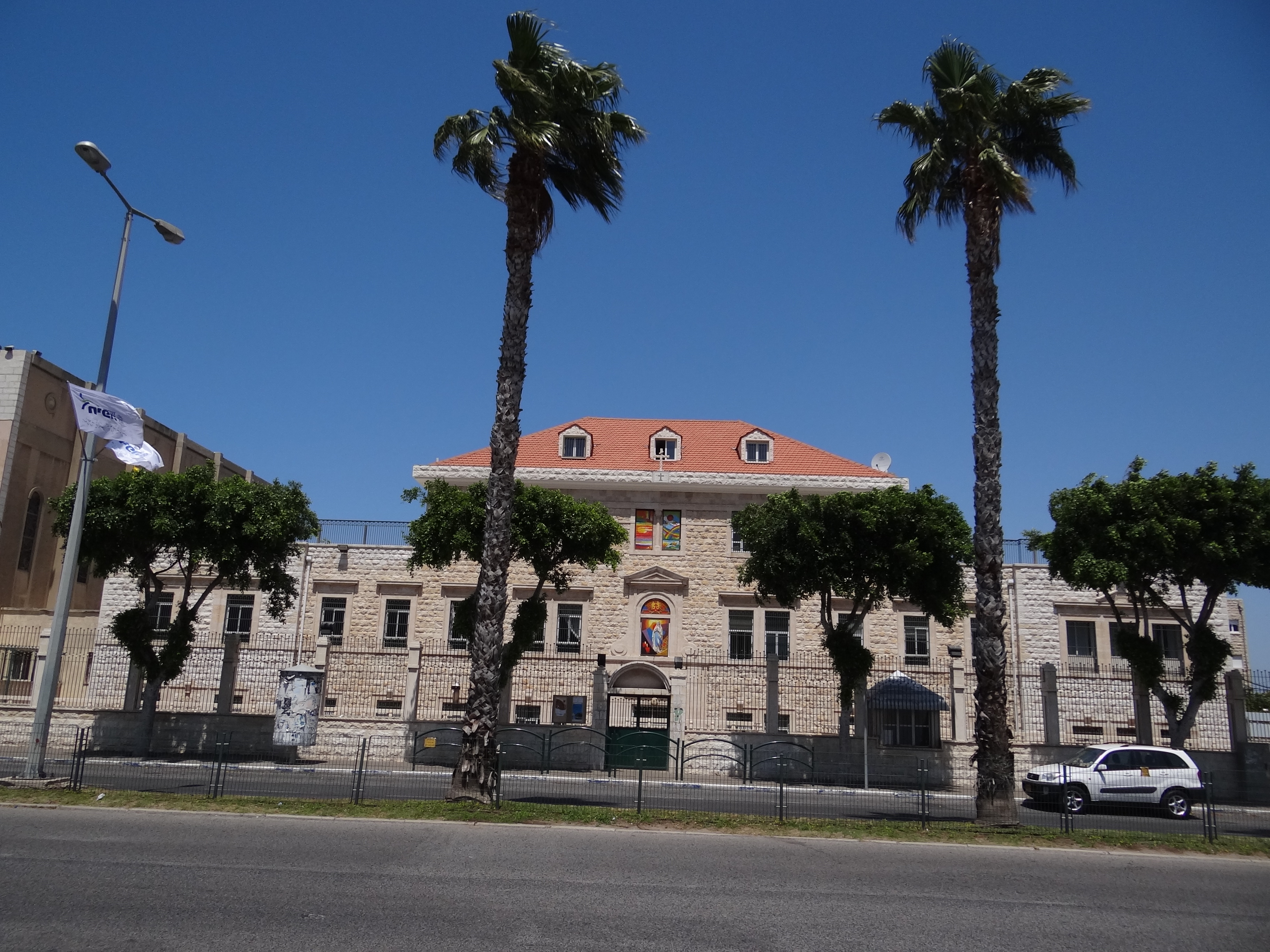
Catholic school in Haifa: High level Christian schools are among Israel's best performing educational institutions.

The Israel Central Bureau of Statistics noted that when taking into account the data recorded over the years, Israeli Christian Arabs fared the best in terms of education in comparison to any other group receiving an education in Israel. In 2012 Christian Arabs had the highest rates of success at matriculation examinations, In 2016, Arab Christians had the highest rates of success at matriculation examinations, namely 73.9%, both in comparison to Muslim and Druze Israelis (41% and 51.9% respectively), and to the students from the different branches of the Hebrew (majority Jewish) education system considered as one group (55.1%).

In terms of their socio-economic situation, Arab Christians are more similar to the Jewish population than to the Muslim Arab population. They have the lowest incidence of poverty and the lowest percentage of unemployment, at 4.9%, compared to 6.5% among Jewish men and women. They have also the highest median household income among Arab citizens of Israel and second highest median household income among the Israeli ethno-religious groups. Also Arab Christians have a high presentation in science and in the white collar professions. In Israel Arab Christians are portrayed as a hard working and upper middle class educated ethno-religious minority. According to study the majority of Christians in Israel (68.2 per cent) are employed in the service sector, i.e. banks, insurance companies, schools, tourism, hospitals etc.

According to the study "Are Christian Arabs the New Israeli Jews? Reflections on the Educational Level of Arab Christians in Israel" by Hanna David from the University of Tel Aviv, one of the factors why Israeli Arab Christians are the most educated segment of Israel's population is the high level of the Christian educational institutions. Christian schools in Israel are among the best schools in the country, and while those schools represent only 4% of the Arab schooling sector, about 34% of Arab university students come from Christian schools, and about 87% of the Israeli Arabs in the high tech sector have been educated in Christian schools. A 2011 Maariv article described the Christian Arab sector as "the most successful in the education system", an opinion supported by the Israel Central Bureau of Statistics and others who point out that Christian Arabs fared best in terms of education in comparison to any other group receiving an education in Israel.

=== Lebanese people ===
There are 3,500 Lebanese people in Israel, most of them are former members of the South Lebanon Army (SLA) and their families. The SLA was a Christian-dominated militia allied with the Israel Defense Forces during the South Lebanon conflict until Israel's withdrawal from Lebanon in May 2000 that ended the Israeli occupation of Southern Lebanon. The majority are Maronites but there are also Muslims, Druze and Christians of other denominations among them. They are registered by the Ministry of Interior as "Lebanese" and hold Israeli citizenship. They are located across the country, mainly in the Northern District, in cities such as Nahariya, Kiryat Shmona, Tiberias, and Haifa.

The native language of former SLA members is Lebanese Arabic. However, the language is only partially transmitted from one generation to another. The majority of the second generation understand and speak Lebanese Arabic but are unable to read and write it. Young Lebanese Israeli mainly text in Hebrew or, more rarely, in Lebanese Arabic written in the Hebrew alphabet. Religious books for children and youths are similarly written in Classical Arabic (or in Lebanese Arabic for some songs) in Hebrew letters.

== Population ==
Arabs in Israel population pyramid in 2021

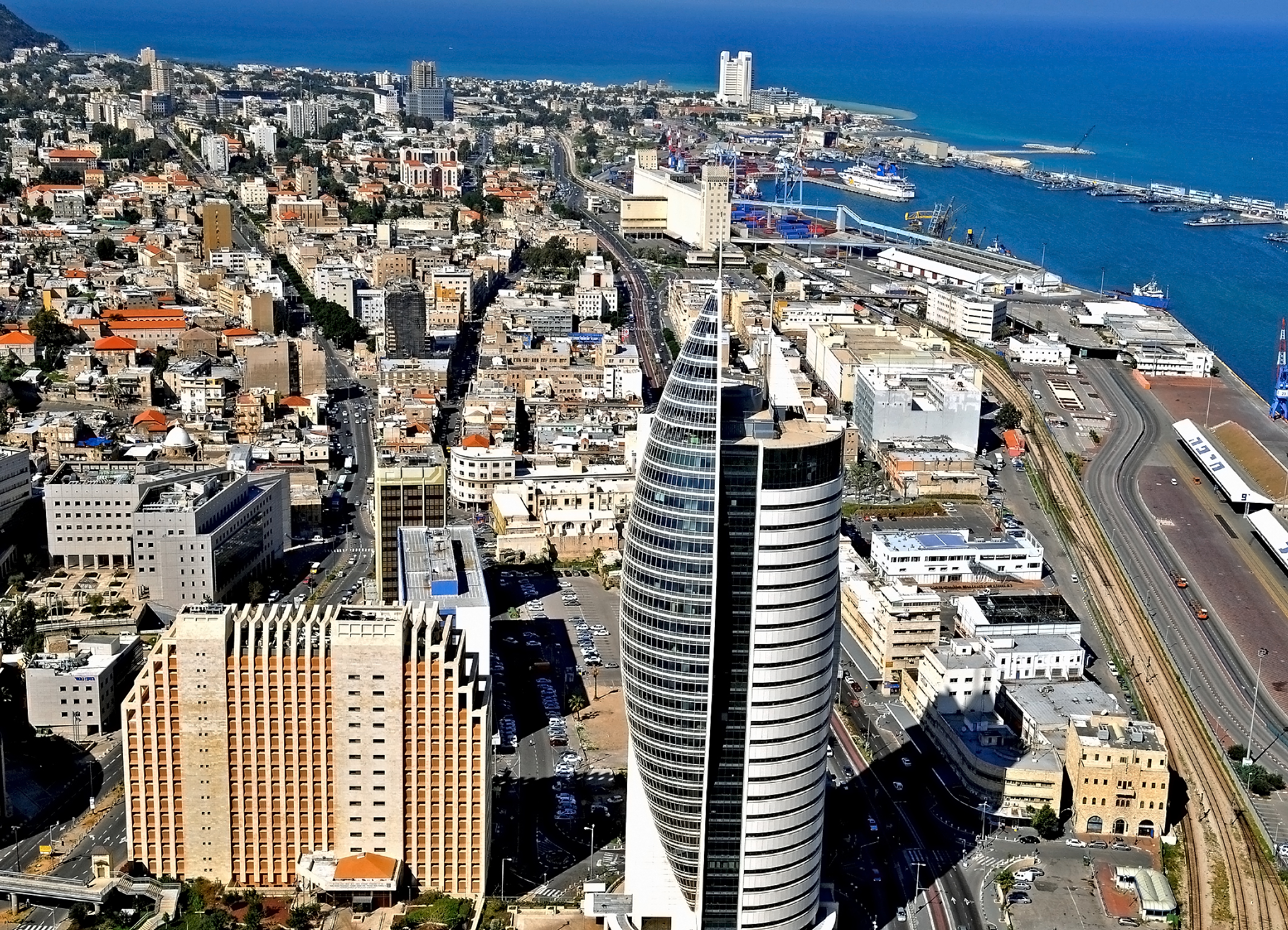
The lower town of Haifa, an area where Arabs, both Christians and Muslims, comprise around 70% of the residents.

In 2006, the official number of Arab residents in Israel was 1,413,500 people, about 20% of Israel's population. This figure includes 209,000 Arabs (14% of the Israeli Arab population) in East Jerusalem, also counted in the Palestinian statistics, although 98% of East Jerusalem Palestinians have either Israeli residency or Israeli citizenship. In 2012, the official number of Arab residents in Israel increased to 1,617,000 people, about 21% of Israel's population. The Arab population in 2023 was estimated at 2,065,000 people, representing 21% of the country's population.

According to the Israeli Central Bureau of Statistics census in 2010, "the Arab population lives in 134 towns and villages. About 44 percent of them live in towns (compared to 81 percent of the Jewish population); 48 percent live in villages with local councils (compared to 9 percent of the Jewish population). Four percent of the Arab citizens live in small villages with regional councils, while the rest live in unrecognized villages (the proportion is much higher, 31 percent in the Negev)". The Arab population in Israel is located in five main areas: Galilee (54.6% of total Israeli Arabs), Triangle (23.5% of total Israeli Arabs), Golan Heights, East Jerusalem, and Northern Negev (13.5% of total Israeli Arabs). Around 8.4% (approximately 102,000 inhabitants) of Israeli Arabs live in officially mixed Jewish-Arab cities (excluding Arab residents in East Jerusalem), including Haifa, Lod, Ramle, Jaffa-Tel Aviv, Acre, Nof HaGalil, and Ma'alot Tarshiha.

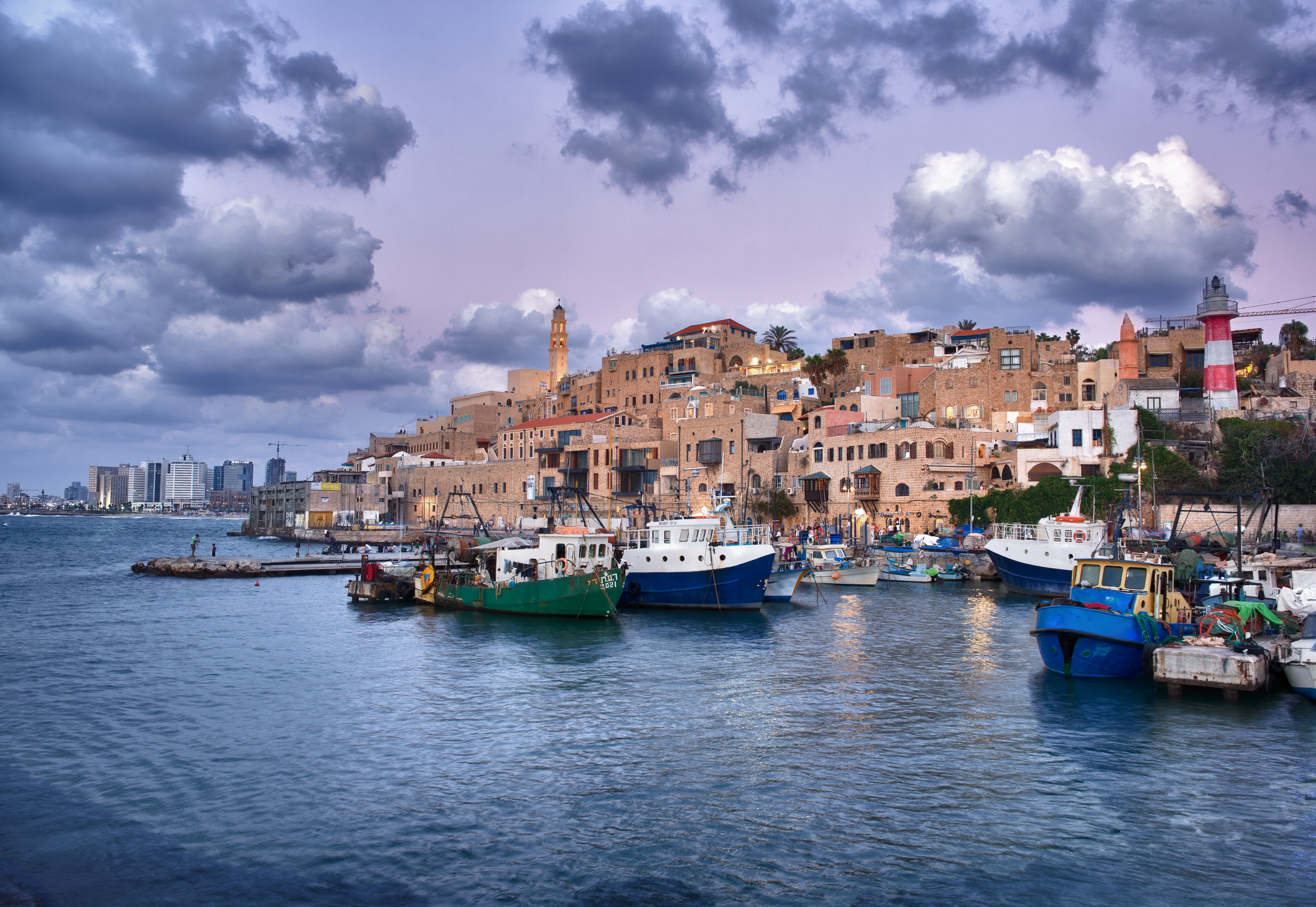
Jaffa, which currently has 16,000 Arab residents, mixed of Muslims and Christians.

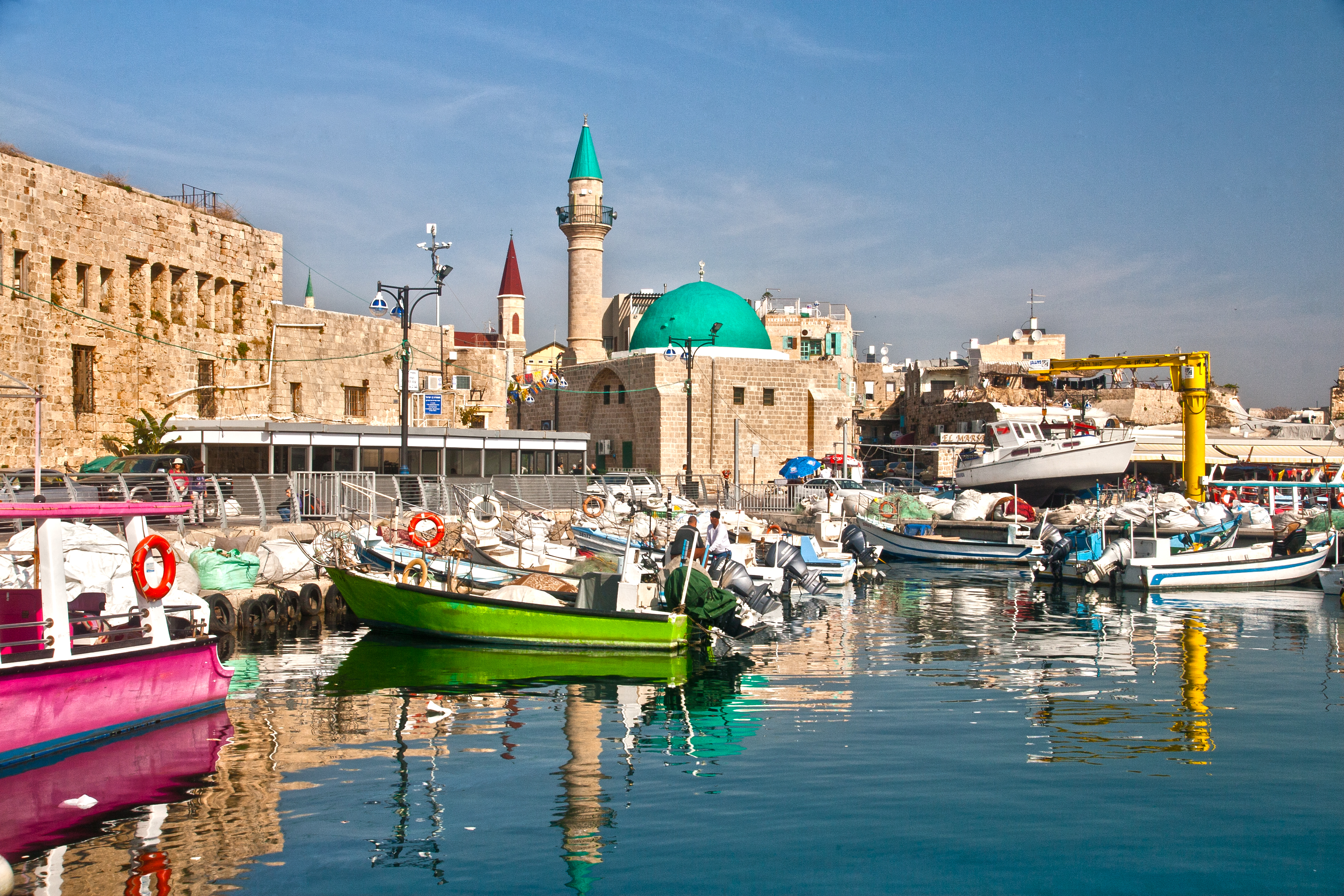
Old City of Acre, an area where Arabs make up 95% of the residents.

In Israel's Northern District Arab citizens of Israel form a majority of the population (52%) and about 50% of the Arab population lives in 114 different localities throughout Israel. In total there are 122 primarily if not entirely Arab localities in Israel, 89 of them having populations over two thousand. The seven townships as well as the Abu Basma Regional Council that have been constructed by the government for the Bedouin population of the Negev, are the only Arab localities to have been established since 1948, with the aim of relocating the Arab Bedouin citizens (see preceding section on Bedouin).

46% of the country's Arabs (622,400 people) live in predominantly Arab communities in the north. In 2024 Nazareth was the largest Arab city, with a population of 75,704, roughly 40,000 of whom are Muslim. Shefa-'Amr has a population of approximately 43,858 and the city is mixed with sizable populations of Muslims, Christians, and Druze.

Jerusalem, a mixed city, has the largest overall Arab population. Jerusalem housed 332,600 Arabs in 2016 (37.7% of the city's residents) and together with the local council of Abu Ghosh, some 19% of the country's entire Arab population.

14% of Arab citizens live in the Haifa District predominantly in the Wadi Ara region. Here is the largest Muslim city, Umm al-Fahm, with a population of 60,209. Baqa-Jatt is the second largest Arab population center in the district. The city of Haifa has an Arab population of 10%, much of it in the Wadi Nisnas, Abbas and Halissa neighborhoods. Wadi Nisnas and Abbas neighborhoods, are largely Christian, Halisa and Kababir are largely Muslim.

10% of the country's Arab population resides in the Central District of Israel, primarily the cities of Tayibe, Tira, and Qalansawe as well as the mixed cities of Lod and Ramla which have mainly Jewish populations.

Of the remaining 11%, 10% live in Bedouin communities in the northwestern Negev. The Bedouin city of Rahat is the only Arab city in the Southern District and it is the third largest Arab city in Israel.

The remaining 1% of the country's Arab population lives in cities that are almost entirely Jewish, such as Nazareth Illit with an Arab population of 22% and Tel Aviv-Yafo, 4%.

In February 2008, the government announced that the first new Arab city would be constructed in Israel. According to Haaretz, "[s]ince the establishment of the State of Israel, not a single new Arab settlement has been established, with the exception of permanent housing projects for Bedouins in the Negev". The city, Givat Tantur, was never constructed even after 10 years.

=== Major Arab localities ===
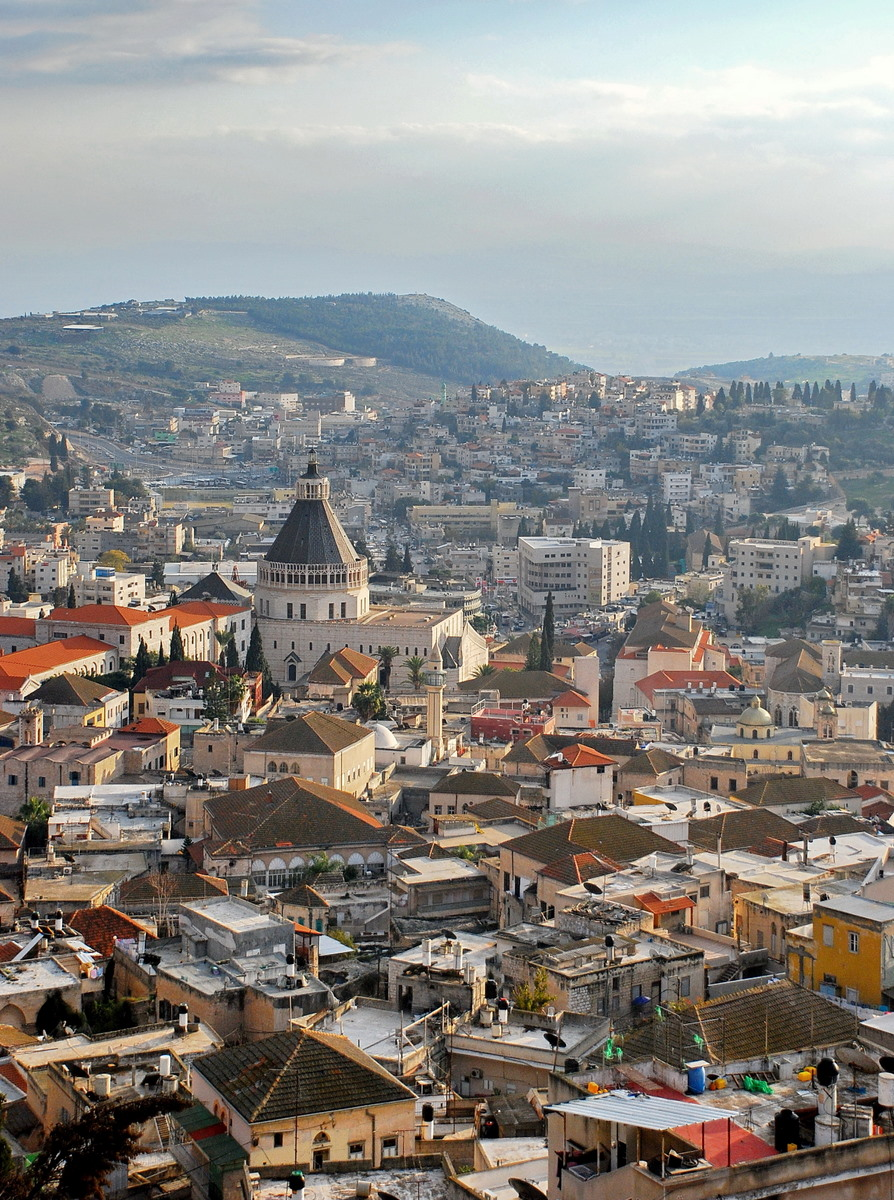
Nazareth, which is a mixed ancient city of Muslims and Christians, is the largest Arab city in Israel.

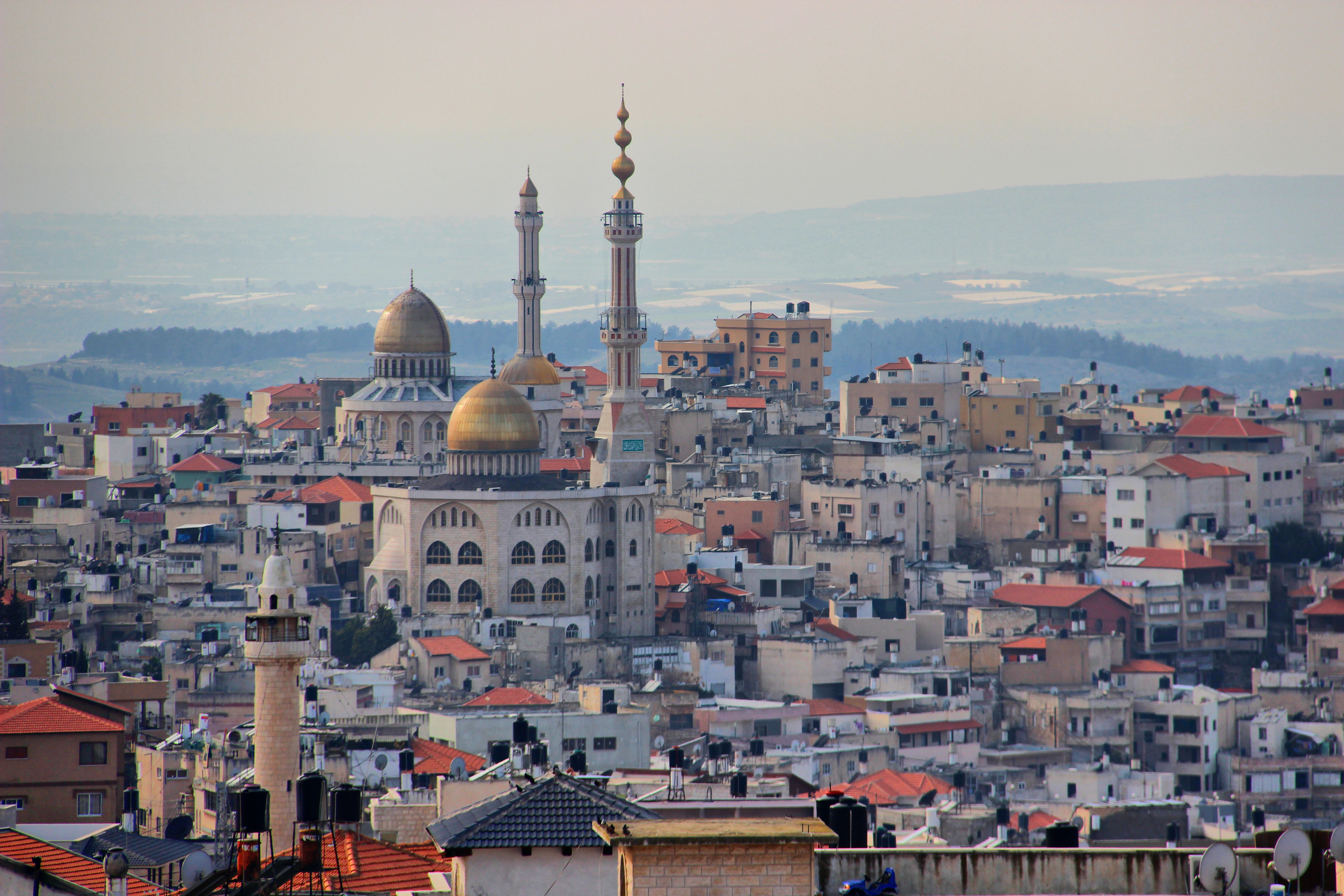
Umm al-Fahm is the third largest Arab city in Israel.

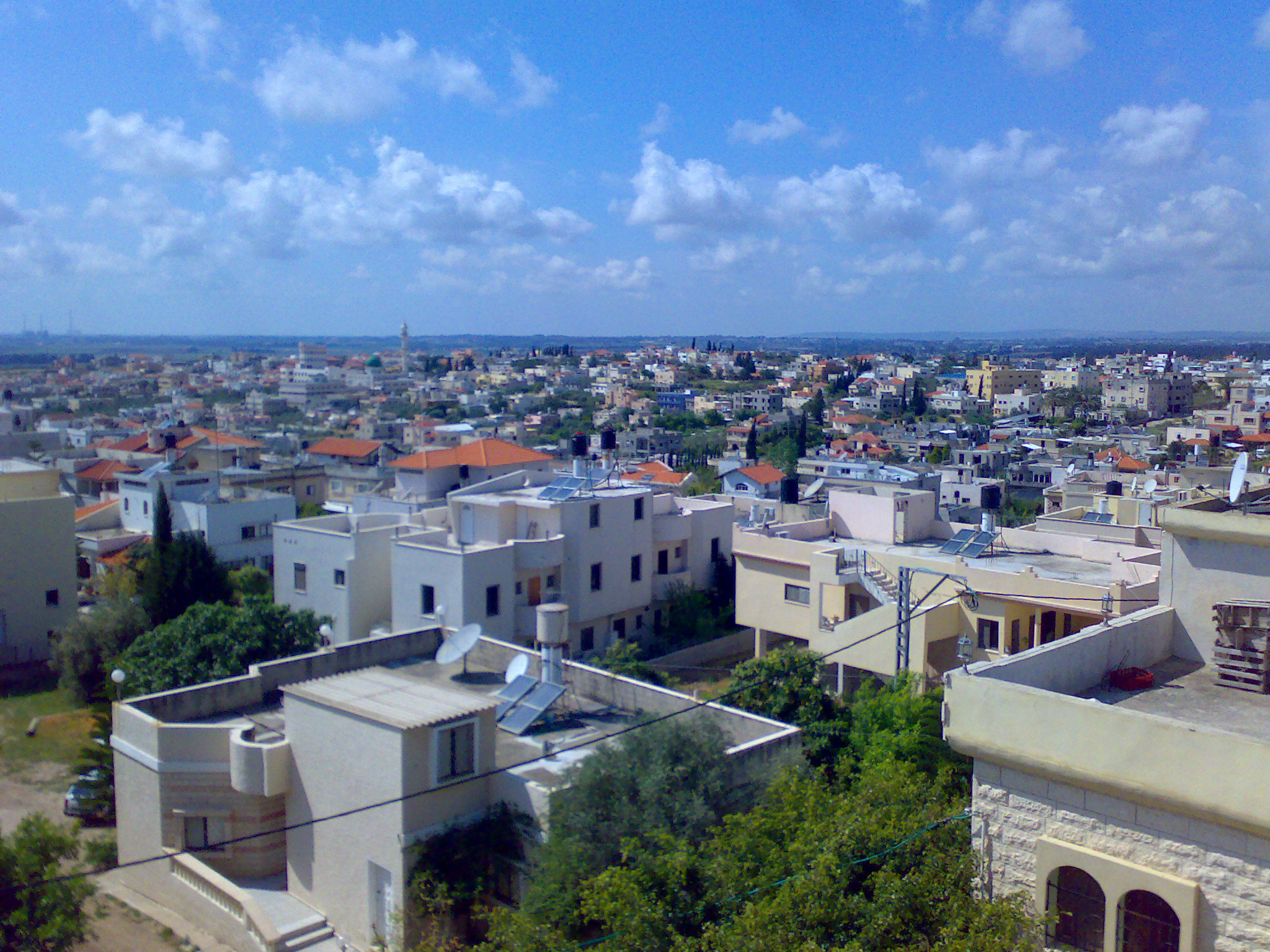
Baqa al-Gharbiyye is the eighth largest Arab city in Israel.

Arabs make up the majority of the population of the "heart of the Galilee" and of the areas along the Green Line including the Wadi Ara region. Bedouin Arabs make up the majority of the northeastern section of the Negev.

Significant population centers (2014)
Locality	Population	District
Nazareth	74,600	North
Rahat	60,400	South
Umm al-Fahm	51,400	Haifa
Tayibe	40,200	Center
Shefa-'Amr	39,200	North
Tamra	31,700	North
Sakhnin	28,600	North
Baqa al-Gharbiyye	27,500	Haifa
Tira	24,400	Center
Ar'ara	23,600	Haifa
Arraba	23,500	North
Kafr Qasim	21,400	Center
Maghar	21,300	North
Qalansawe	21,000	Center
Kafr Kanna	20,800	North
Source: Israel Central Bureau of Statistics

=== Perceived demographic threat ===
The phrase demographic threat (or demographic bomb) is used within the Israeli political sphere to describe the growth of Israel's Arab citizenry as constituting a threat to its maintenance of its status as a Jewish state with a Jewish demographic majority. In the northern part of Israel the percentage of the population that is Jewish is declining. The increasing population of Arabs within Israel, and the majority status they hold in two major geographic regions – the Galilee and the Triangle – has become a growing point of open political contention in recent years. Among Arabs, Muslims have the highest birth rate, followed by Druze, and then Christians. Israeli historian Benny Morris stated in 2004 that, while he strongly opposes expulsion of Israeli Arabs, in case of an "apocalyptic" scenario where Israel comes under total attack with non-conventional weapons and comes under existential threat, an expulsion might be the only option. He compared the Israeli Arabs to a "time bomb" and "a potential fifth column" in both demographic and security terms and said they are liable to undermine the state in time of war.

Several politicians have viewed the Arabs in Israel as a security and demographic threat.

The phrase "demographic bomb" was famously used by Benjamin Netanyahu in 2003 when he noted that, if the percentage of Arab citizens rises above its current level of about 20 percent, Israel will not be able to maintain a Jewish demographic majority. Netanyahu's comments were criticized as racist by Arab Knesset members and a range of civil rights and human rights organizations, such as the Association for Civil Rights in Israel. Even earlier allusions to the "demographic threat" can be found in an internal Israeli government document drafted in 1976 known as the Koenig Memorandum, which laid out a plan for reducing the number and influence of Arab citizens of Israel in the Galilee region.

In 2003, the Israeli daily Ma'ariv published an article entitled "Special Report: Polygamy is a Security Threat", detailing a report put forth by the Director of the Population Administration at the time, Herzl Gedj; the report described polygamy in the Bedouin sector a "security threat" and advocated means of reducing the birth rate in the Arab sector. The Population Administration is a department of the Demographic Council, whose purpose, according to the Israeli Central Bureau of Statistics, is: "...to increase the Jewish birthrate by encouraging women to have more children using government grants, housing benefits, and other incentives". In 2008 the minister of the interior appointed Yaakov Ganot as new head of the Population Administration, which according to Haaretz is "probably the most important appointment an interior minister can make".

A January 2006 study rejects the "demographic time bomb" threat based on statistical data that shows Jewish births have increased while Arab births have begun to drop. The study noted shortcomings in earlier demographic predictions (for example, in the 1960s, predictions suggested that Arabs would be the majority in 1990). The study also demonstrated that Christian Arab and Druze birth rates were actually below those of Jewish birth rates in Israel. The study used data from a Gallup poll to demonstrate that the desired family size for Arabs in Israel and Jewish Israelis were the same. The study's population forecast for 2025 predicted that Arabs would comprise only 25% of the Israeli population. Nevertheless, the Bedouin population, with its high birth rates, continues to be perceived as a threat to a Jewish demographic majority in the south, and a number of development plans, such as the Blueprint Negev, address this concern.

A study showed that in 2010, Jewish birthrates rose by 31% and 19,000 diaspora Jews immigrated to Israel, while the Arab birthrate fell by 2%.

=== Land and population exchange ===
Survey among residents of Um Al-Fahm
Prefer joining Palestinian State	11%
Prefer continued Israeli jurisdiction	83%
No opinion	6%
Source: Kul Al-Arab, 2000

Respondents opposed joining future Palestinian State
Prefer to remain in democratic regime with high living standards	54%
Satisfied with present situation	18%
Not willing to make sacrifices for creation of Palestinian state	14%
No stated reason	11%
Source: Kul Al-Arab, 2000

Some Israeli politicians advocate land-swap proposals in order to assure a continued Jewish majority within Israel. A specific proposal is that Israel transfer sovereignty of part of the Arab-populated Wadi Ara area (west of the Green Line) to a future Palestinian state, in return for formal sovereignty over the major Jewish settlement "blocks" that lie inside the West Bank east of the Green Line.

Avigdor Lieberman of Yisrael Beiteinu, the fourth largest faction in the 17th Knesset, is one of the foremost advocates of the transfer of large Arab towns located just inside Israel near the border with the West Bank (e.g. Tayibe, Umm al-Fahm, Baqa al-Gharbiyye), to the jurisdiction of the Palestinian National Authority in exchange for Israeli settlements located inside the West Bank.

In October 2006, Yisrael Beiteinu formally joined in the ruling government's parliamentary coalition, headed by Kadima. After the Israeli Cabinet confirmed Avigdor Lieberman's appointment to the position of "minister for strategic threats", Labour Party representative and science, sport and culture minister Ophir Pines-Paz resigned his post. In his resignation letter to Ehud Olmert, Pines-Paz wrote: "I couldn't sit in a government with a minister who preaches racism."

The Lieberman Plan caused a stir among Arab citizens of Israel. Various polls show that Arabs in Israel do not wish to move to the West Bank or Gaza if a Palestinian state is created there. In a survey conducted by Kul Al-Arab among 1,000 residents of Um Al-Fahm, 83 percent of respondents opposed the idea of transferring their city to Palestinian jurisdiction, while 11 percent supported the proposal and 6 percent did not express their position.

Of those opposed to the idea, 54% said that they were against becoming part of a Palestinian state because they wanted to continue living under a democratic regime and enjoying a good standard of living. Of these opponents, 18% said that they were satisfied with their present situation, that they were born in Israel and that they were not interested in moving to any other state. Another 14% of this same group said that they were not prepared to make sacrifices for the sake of the creation of a Palestinian state. Another 11 percent cited no reason for their opposition.

== Politics ==
Israeli-Arab voter turnout in Knesset elections View chart definition.

=== Arab voting ===
The table below shows the votes of Arab-Israelis for Arab-led political parties, Jewish-led political parties and the satellite lists:

Year	Arab parties/Maki	Arab satellite lists	Jewish parties
1949	22%	52%	26%
1951	16%	55%	29%
1955	16%	58%	27%
1959	11%	59%	30%
1961	23%	46%	32%
1965	24%	44%	33%
1969	30%	41%	29%
1973	37%	36%	27%
1977	52%	21%	27%
1981	39%	12%	49%
1984	50%		50%
1988	58%		42%
1992	48%		52%
1996	62%		38%
1999	69%		31%
2003	69%		31%
2006	72%		28%
2009	82%		18%
2013	77%		23%
2015	83%		17%
April 2019	72%		28%
September 2019	82%		18%
2020	88%		12%
2021	80%		20%
2022	86%		14%

=== Arab political parties ===
There are three mainstream Arab parties in Israel: Hadash (a joint Arab-Jewish party with a large Arab presence), Balad, and the United Arab List, which is a coalition of several different political organizations including the Islamic Movement in Israel. In addition to these, there is Ta'al, which currently run with Hadash. All of these parties primarily represent Arab-Israeli and Palestinian interests, and the Islamic Movement is an Islamist organization with two factions: one that opposes Israel's existence, and another that opposes its existence as a Jewish state. Two Arab parties ran in Israel's first election in 1949, with one, the Democratic List of Nazareth, winning two seats. Until the 1960s all Arab parties in the Knesset were aligned with Mapai, the ruling party.

A minority of Arabs join and vote for Zionist parties; in the 2006 elections 30% of the Arab vote went to such parties, up from 25% in 2003, though down on the 1999 (31%) and 1996 elections (33%). Left-wing parties (i.e. Labor Party and Meretz-Yachad, and previously One Nation) are the most popular parties amongst Arabs, though some Druze have also voted for right-wing parties such as Likud and Yisrael Beiteinu, as well as the centrist Kadima.

Arab-dominated parties typically do not join governing coalitions. However, historically these parties have formed alliances with dovish Jewish parties and promoted the formation of their governments by voting with them from the opposition. Arab parties are credited with keeping Prime Minister Yitzhak Rabin in power, and they have suggested they would do the same for a government led by Labor leader Isaac Herzog and peace negotiator Tzipi Livni. A 2015 Haaretz poll found that a majority of Israeli Arabs would like their parties, then running on a joint list, to join the governing coalition.

=== Representation in the Knesset ===
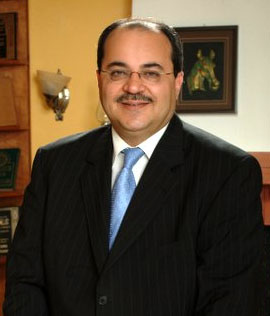
Ahmad Tibi, leader of the Arab party Ta'al, served as Deputy Speaker of the Knesset for much of the period between 2006 and 2022.

Palestinian Arabs sat in the state's first parliamentary assembly in 1949. In 2011, 13 of the 120 members of the Israeli Parliament are Arab citizens, most representing Arab political parties, and one of Israel's Supreme Court judges is a Palestinian Arab.

The 2015 elections included 18 Arab members of Knesset. Along with 13 members of the Joint List, there were five Arab parliamentarians representing Zionist parties, which is more than double their number in the previous Knesset.

Some Arab Members of the Knesset, past and present, are under police investigation for their visits to countries designated as enemy countries by Israeli law. This law was amended following MK Mohammad Barakeh's trip to Syria in 2001, such that MKs must explicitly request permission to visit these countries from the Minister of the Interior. In August 2006, Balad MKs Azmi Bishara, Jamal Zahalka, and Wasil Taha visited Syria without requesting nor receiving such permission, and a criminal investigation of their actions was launched. Former Arab Member of Knesset Mohammed Miari was questioned 18 September 2006 by police on suspicion of having entered a designated enemy country without official permission. He was questioned "under caution" for 2.5 hours in the Petah Tikva station about his recent visit to Syria. Another former Arab Member of Knesset, Muhammad Kanaan, was also summoned for police questioning regarding the same trip. In 2010, six Arab MKs visited Libya, an anti-Zionist Arab state, and met with Muammar al-Gaddafi and various senior government officials. Gaddafi urged them to seek a one-state solution, and for Arabs to "multiply" in order to counter any "plots" to expel them.

According to a study commissioned by the Arab Association of Human Rights entitled "Silencing Dissent", over the period 1999–2002, eight of nine of the then Arab Knesset members were beaten by Israeli forces during demonstrations. Most recently according to the report, legislation has been passed, including three election laws [e.g., banning political parties], and two Knesset related laws aimed to "significantly curb the minority [Arab population] right to choose a public representative and for those representatives to develop independent political platforms and carry out their duties".

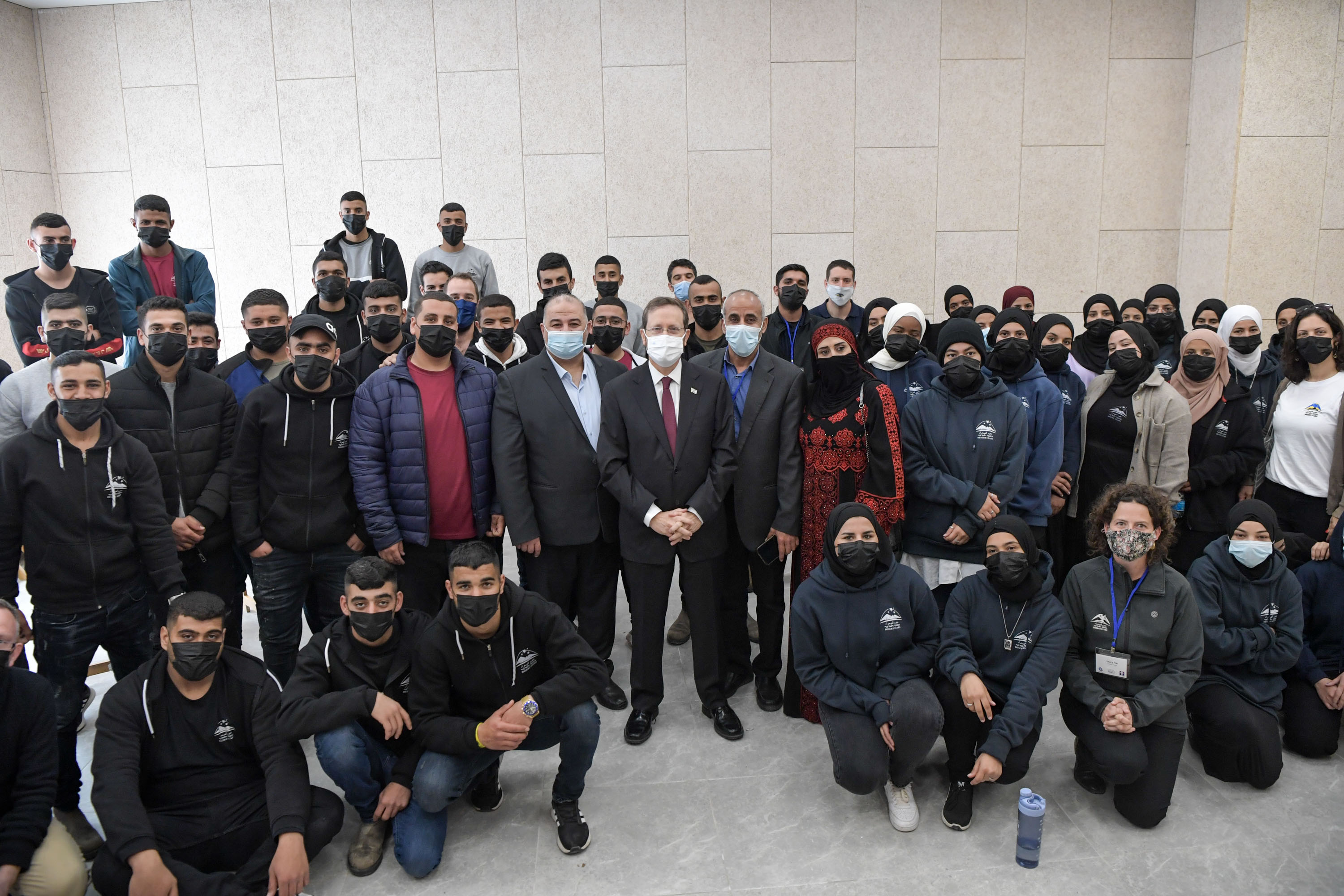
United Arab List leader Mansour Abbas, Israeli President Herzog and young Bedouins in the city of Rahat, 15 February 2022

The Knesset Ethics Committee has on several occasions banned Arab MKs that the committee felt were acting outside acceptable norms. In 2016, Hanin Zoabi and Jamal Zahalka were banned from plenary sessions for four months and Basel Ghattas for two months after they had visited families of Palestinian attackers killed by Israeli security forces. Ghattas was again banned for six months in 2017 over charges of having smuggled cell phones to Palestinian prisoners and Zoabi was banned for a week for having called IDF soldiers "murderers."

In 2016, the Knesset passed a controversial law that would allow it to impeach any MK who incites racism or supports armed struggle against Israel. Critics said that the law was undemocratic and would mainly be used to silence Arab MKs. As of 2020, no MK has been impeached by the law. In 2018, the Israeli supreme court of justice rejected arguments that the law would harm specific political parties and ruled that checks and balances within the law serve as sufficient protection against abuse of rights. For example, the law requires 70 Knesset members, 10 of whom must be from the opposition, to petition to the Knesset House Committee, and could only be finalized with a vote of 90 out of 120 MKs in favor of the impeachment.

=== Representation in the civil service sphere ===
In the public employment sphere, by the end of 2002, 6% of 56,362 Israeli civil servants were Arab. In January 2004, Prime Minister Ariel Sharon declared that every state-run company must have at least one Arab citizen of Israel on its board of directors.

=== Representation in political, judicial and military positions ===
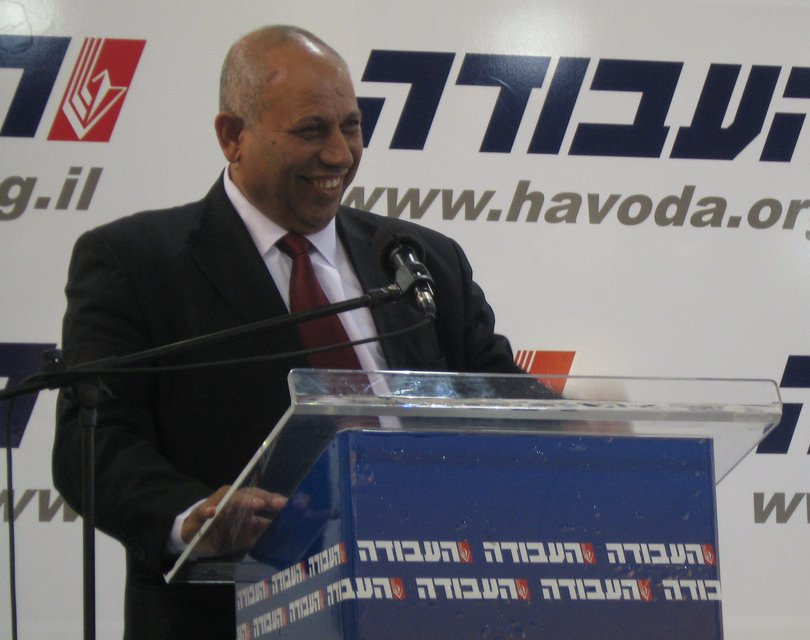
Raleb Majadele, the first non-Druze Arab minister in Israel's history

Knesset: Arab citizens of Israel have been elected to every Knesset, and as of 2015 held 17 of its 120 seats. The first female Arab MP was Hussniya Jabara, a Muslim Arab from central Israel, who was elected in 1999.

Government: Until 2001, no Arab had been included Israel's cabinet. In 2001, this changed, when Salah Tarif, a Druze Arab citizen of Israel, was appointed a member of Ariel Sharon's cabinet without a portfolio. Tarif was later ejected after being convicted of corruption. The first non-Druze Arab minister in Israel's history was Raleb Majadele, who in 2007 was appointed a minister without portfolio, and a month later appointed minister for Science, Culture and Sport. Following this precedent, additional Muslim Arabs served as ministers or deputy ministers, including Issawi Frej, Abd el-Aziz el-Zoubi and Nawaf Massalha

The appointment of Majadele was criticized by far-right Israelis, some of whom are also within the Cabinet, but this drew condemnation across the mainstream Israeli political spectrum. Meanwhile, Arab lawmakers called the appointment an attempt to "whitewash Israel's discriminatory policies against its Arab minority".

Supreme Court: Abdel Rahman Zuabi, a Muslim from northern Israel, was the first Arab on the Israeli Supreme Court, serving a 9-month term in 1999. In 2004, Salim Joubran, a Christian Arab from Haifa descended from Lebanese Maronites, became the first Arab to hold a permanent appointment on the Court. Joubran's expertise lies in the field of criminal law. George Karra, a Christian Arab from Jaffa has served as a Tel Aviv District Court judge since 2000. He was the presiding judge in the trial of Moshe Katsav. In 2011, he was nominated as a candidate for the Israeli Supreme Court.

Foreign Service: Ali Yahya, an Arab Muslim, became the first Arab ambassador for Israel in 1995 when he was appointed ambassador to Finland. He served until 1999, and in 2006 was appointed ambassador to Greece. Other Arab ambassadors include Walid Mansour, a Druze, appointed ambassador to Vietnam in 1999, and Reda Mansour, also a Druze, a former ambassador to Ecuador. Mohammed Masarwa, an Arab Muslim, was Consul-General in Atlanta. In 2006, Ishmael Khaldi was appointed Israeli consul in San Francisco, becoming the first Bedouin consul of the State of Israel.

Israel Defense Forces: Arab Generals in the IDF include Major General Hussain Fares, commander of Israel's border police, and Major General Yosef Mishlav, head of the Home Front Command and current Coordinator of Government Activities in the Territories. Both are members of the Druze community. Other high-ranking officers in the IDF include Lieutenant Colonel Amos Yarkoni (born Abd el-Majid Haydar/ عبد الماجد حيدر) from the Bedouin community, a legendary officer in the Israel Defense Forces and one of six Israeli Arabs to have received the IDF's third highest decoration, the Medal of Distinguished Service.

Israeli Police: In 2011, Jamal Hakroush became the first Muslim Arab deputy Inspector-General in the Israeli Police. He has previously served as district commander of two districts.

Jewish National Fund: In 2007, Ra'adi Sfori became the first Arab citizen of Israel to be elected as a JNF director, over a petition against his appointment. The court upheld the JNF's appointment, explaining, "As this is one director among a large number, there is no chance he will have the opportunity to cancel the organization's goals."

=== Other political organizations and movements ===
Abna el-Balad

Abnaa el-Balad is a political movement that grew out of organizing by Arab university youth, beginning in 1969. It is not affiliated with the Arab Knesset party Balad. While participating in municipal elections, Abnaa al-Balad firmly reject any participation in the Israeli Knesset. Political demands include "the return of all Palestinian refugees to their homes and lands, [an] end [to] the Israeli occupation and Zionist apartheid and the establishment [of] a democratic secular state in Palestine as the ultimate solution to the Arab-Zionist conflict."

High Follow-Up Committee for Arab Citizens of Israel

The High Follow-Up Committee for Arab Citizens of Israel is an extra-parliamentary umbrella organization that represents Arab citizens of Israel at the national level. It is "the top representative body deliberating matters of general concern to the entire Arab community and making binding decisions." While it enjoys de facto recognition from the State of Israel, it lacks official or de jure recognition from the state for its activities in this capacity.

Ta'ayush

Ta'ayush is "a grassroots movement of Arabs and Jews working to break down the walls of racism and segregation by constructing a true Arab-Jewish partnership."

Regional Council of Unrecognized Villages

The Regional Council of Unrecognized Villages is a body of unofficial representatives of the unrecognized villages throughout the Negev region in the south.

=== Attempts to ban Arab political parties ===
Amendment 9 to the 'Basic Law: The Knesset and the Law of Political Parties' states that a political party "may not participate in the elections if there is in its goals or actions a denial of the existence of the State of Israel as the state of the Jewish people, a denial of the democratic nature of the state, or incitement to racism." There have been a number of attempts to disqualify Arab parties based on this rule, however as of 2010, all such attempts were either rejected by the Israeli Central Elections Committee or overturned by the Israeli Supreme Court.

==== Progressive List for Peace ====
An Israeli Central Elections Committee ruling which allowed the Progressive List for Peace to run for the Knesset in 1988 was challenged based on this amendment, but the committee's decision was upheld by the Israeli Supreme Court, which ruled that the PLP's platform calling for Israel to become "a state of all its citizens" does not violate the ideology of Israel as the State of the Jewish people, and thus section 7(a) does not apply.

==== Balad ====
In December 2002, Azmi Bishara and his party, Balad, which calls for Israel to become "a state of all its citizens", were banned by the Israeli Central Elections Committee, on the grounds of refusing to recognize Israel as a "Jewish and democratic state" and making statements promoting armed struggle against it. The Supreme Court overruled the decision in January 2003. Bishara served as a Knesset member from 1996 to 2007. He reportedly told an audience in Lebanon in December 2005 that Arab citizens "... are like all Arabs, only with Israeli citizenship forced upon them ... Return Palestine to us and take your democracy with you. We Arabs are not interested in it". Bishara resigned his Knesset office and left the country in 2007 amidst news that criminal charges were being laid against him. He has been charged with espionage and money laundering, stemming from allegations that he gave Hizbullah information on strategic targets that should be attacked with rockets during the 2006 Lebanon War, in exchange for large amounts of money.

In 2022, Balad was barred by the Israeli Central Elections Committee for undermining Israel as a "Jewish and democratic state". The High Court unanimously overturned the ruling.

==== United Arab List – Ta'al and Balad ====
In 2009, United Arab List – Ta'al and Balad were disqualified, on grounds that they do not recognize the State of Israel and call for armed conflict against it. The Supreme Court overturned the committee's decision by a majority of eight to one.

== Legal and political status ==
Israel's Declaration of Independence called for the establishment of a Jewish state with equality of social and political rights, irrespective of religion, race, or sex.

The rights of citizens are guaranteed by a set of basic laws (Israel does not have a written constitution). Although this set of laws does not explicitly include the term "right to equality", the Israeli Supreme Court has consistently interpreted "Basic Law: Human Dignity and Liberty" and "Basic Law: Freedom of Occupation (1994)" as guaranteeing equal rights for all Israeli citizens.

The Israeli Ministry of Foreign Affairs states that "Arab Israelis are citizens of Israel with equal rights" and states that "The only legal distinction between Arab and Jewish citizens is not one of rights, but rather of civic duty. Since Israel's establishment, Arab citizens have been exempted from compulsory service in the Israel Defense Forces (IDF)." Druze and Circassians are drafted into the Israeli army, while other Arabs may serve voluntarily; however, only a small number of Arabs choose to volunteer for the Israeli army.

Many Arab citizens feel that the state, as well as society at large, not only actively limits them to second-class citizenship, but treats them as enemies, affecting their perception of the de jure versus de facto quality of their citizenship. The joint document The Future Vision of the Palestinian Arabs in Israel, asserts: "Defining the Israeli State as a Jewish State and exploiting democracy in the service of its Jewishness excludes us, and creates tension between us and the nature and essence of the State." The document explains that by definition the "Jewish State" concept is based on ethnically preferential treatment towards Jews enshrined in immigration (the Law of Return) and land policy (the Jewish National Fund), and calls for the establishment of minority rights protections enforced by an independent anti-discrimination commission.

A 2004 report by Mossawa, an advocacy center for Palestinian-Arab citizens of Israel, states that since the events of October 2000, 16 Arabs had been killed by security forces, bringing the total to 29 victims of "institutional violence" in four years. Ahmed Sa'adi, in his article on The Concept of Protest and its Representation by the Or Commission, states that since 1948 the only protestors to be killed by the police have been Arabs.

Yousef Munayyer, an Israeli citizen and the executive director of The Jerusalem Fund, wrote that Palestinians only have varying degrees of limited rights in Israel. He states that although Palestinians make up about 20% of Israel's population, less than 7% of the budget is allocated to Palestinian citizens. He describes the 1.5 million Arab citizens of Israel as second-class citizens while four million more are not citizens at all. He states that a Jew from any country can move to Israel but a Palestinian refugee, with a valid claim to property in Israel, cannot. Munayyer also described the difficulties he and his wife faced when visiting the country.

=== Arabic and Hebrew as official languages ===
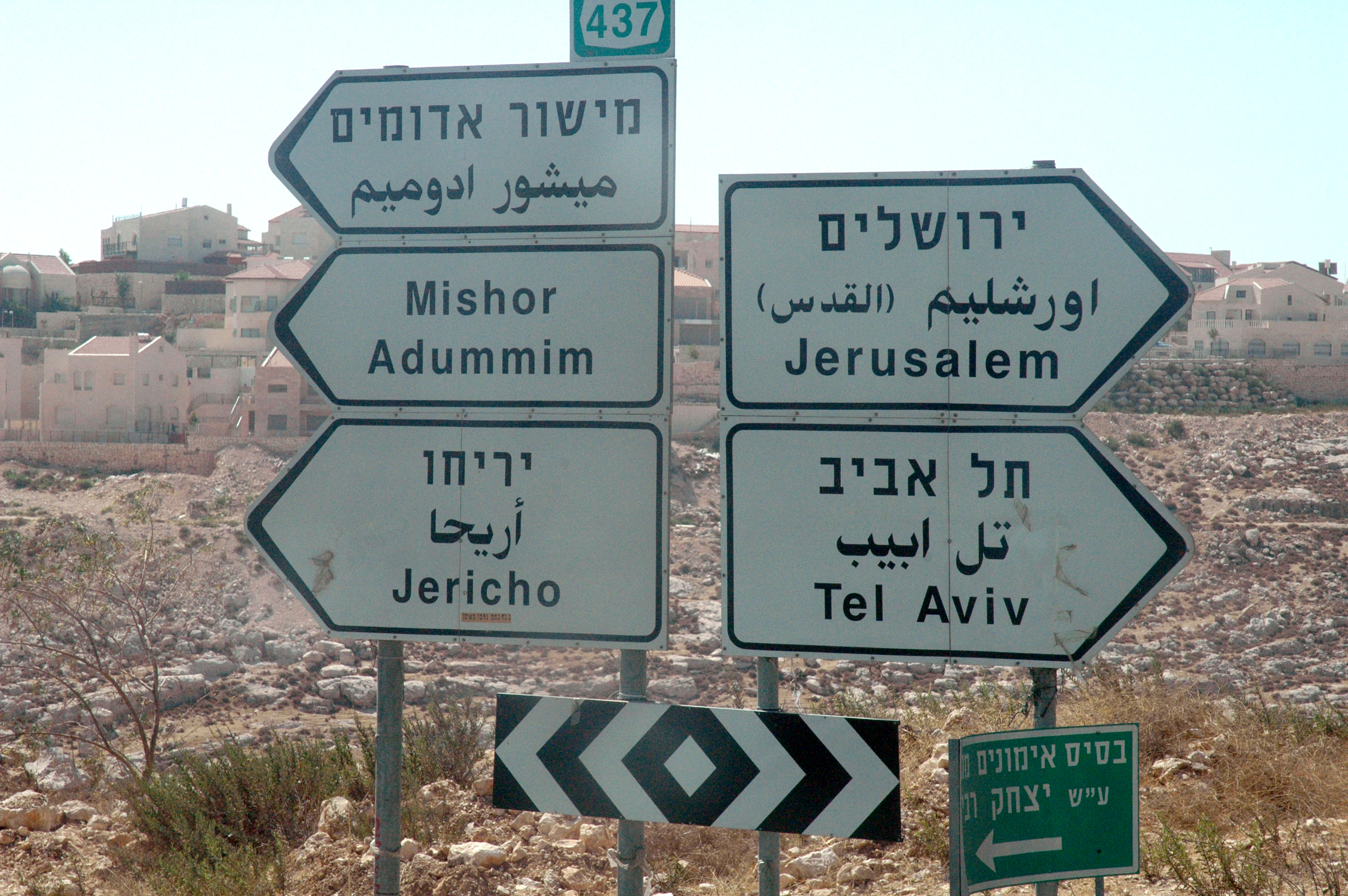
Israeli road signs in Arabic, Hebrew and English

Arabic was until July 2018 one of Israel's official languages. The use of Arabic increased significantly following Supreme Court rulings in the 1990s. Basic Law: Israel as the Nation-State of the Jewish People defines Hebrew as the official language of the State and gives the Arabic language a special status.

Government ministries publish all material intended for the public in Hebrew, with selected material translated into Arabic, English, Russian, and other languages spoken in Israel. There are laws that secure the Arab population's right to receive information in Arabic. Some examples include a portion of the public television channels' productions must be in Arabic or translated into Arabic, safety regulations in working places must be published in Arabic if a significant number of the workers are Arabs, information about medicines or dangerous chemicals must be provided in Arabic, and information regarding elections must be provided in Arabic. The country's laws are published in Hebrew, and eventually English and Arabic translations are published. Publishing the law in Hebrew in the official gazette (Reshumot) is enough to make it valid. Unavailability of an Arabic translation can be regarded as a legal defense only if the defendant proves he could not understand the meaning of the law in any conceivable way. Following appeals to the Israeli Supreme Court, the use of Arabic on street signs and labels increased dramatically. In response to one of the appeals presented by Arab Israeli organizations, the Supreme Court ruled that although second to Hebrew, Arabic is an official language of the State of Israel, and should be used extensively. Today most highway signage is trilingual (Hebrew, Arabic, and English).

Many Arab villages lack street signs of any kind and the Hebrew name is often used. The state's schools in Arab communities teach in Arabic according to a specially adapted curriculum. This curriculum includes mandatory lessons of Hebrew as foreign language from the 3rd grade onwards. Arabic is taught in Hebrew-speaking schools, but only the basic level is mandatory. In the summer of 2008, there was an unsuccessful attempt of right-wing lawmakers to strip Arabic of its status alongside Hebrew as an official language of the state.

=== Israeli national symbols ===
The flag of Israel, based on the Star of David

Some Arab politicians have requested a reevaluation of the Israeli flag and national anthem, arguing that the Star of David at the flag's center is an exclusively Jewish symbol, and Hatikvah does not represent Arab citizens, since it speaks of the Jewish people's desire to return to their homeland. The High Follow-Up Committee for Arab Citizens of Israel and the National Committee for the Heads of the Arab Local Authorities in Israel stated in 2006,

The Israeli legal system includes a number of core laws that produce and reinforce inequality between the Arabs and the Jews in Israel. ... The official bias is not restricted to symbols such as the Israeli flag, but also to deeper legal issues concerning all Palestinian Arabs ... [t]he official definition of Israel as a Jewish state created a fortified ideological barrier in the face of obtaining full equality for the Palestinian Arab citizens of Israel ... We, the Palestinians in Israel, are an integral part of this place ... Israel has tried over the past decades to disengage us from this place, not through physical transfer but through intellectual emotional transfer. Israel has tried to create a new identity on the basis of 'loyalty to the state' ... The State has not determined a position acceptable to us yet in terms of nurturing our Arab culture.

Michael Oren, the former Israeli ambassador to the United Nations, has argued that since the Seal of Solomon (Star of David) is also considered to be an Islamic symbol, Arab citizens of Israel should be able to feel the same sense of loyalty to the flag as Jewish citizens do.

=== Independence Day ===
In Israel, Independence Day takes place on 5 Iyar according to the Hebrew calendar, which means it falls on different dates every year under the Gregorian calendar. Arab citizens of Israel generally mark al-Nakba both on this day, and on 15 May, as do other Palestinians. Druze soldiers, however, were present at Israel's first Independence Day Parade in 1949, and there have since been parades for Druze and Circassians, as well as special events for Bedouins, on Independence Day.

In January 2008, the mayor of Shefa-'Amr, Ursan Yassin, met with officials of the Israeli state committee on the celebrations for the 60th anniversary of independence and announced that Shefa-'Amr intended to take part in the celebrations. He stated: "This is our country and we completely disapprove of the statements made by the Higher Monitoring Committee. I want to hold a central ceremony in Shefa-'Amr, raise all the flags and have a huge feast. The 40,000 residents of Shefa-'Amr feel that they are a part of the State of Israel...The desire to participate in the festivities is shared by most of the residents. We will not raise our children to hate the country. This is our country and we want to live in coexistence with its Jewish residents."

=== Citizenship ===
Citizenship status confers many rights and privileges; voting in Israeli legislative elections; traveling abroad without requiring a laissez passer, the availability of a greater number of jobs, and Israel cannot at any time revoke residency status, whereby health insurance, the right to enter the place of residency, and thus usually also one's source of income are lost.

==== Barriers for East Jerusalem Palestinians ====
As of 2022, only 5% of East Jerusalem Palestinians had Israeli citizenship, despite Israel's having unilaterally annexed the area in 1967. From 1967 to 1974 hundreds per year became Israeli, which the Jerusalem Institute for Policy Research attributes to then-lax Israeli policy, also noting that by the mid-1970s, Palestinian society started to disapprove of becoming Israeli, seeing it as complicit with or collaborating with Israeli occupation. Since 2005, the Israeli West Bank barrier that separates them from Palestinians in the West Bank has changed education and employment markets, and the taboo has weakened — (Israeli citizenship no longer seen as detracting from being Palestinian). However, since 2002, Israel's Population and Immigration Authority has made the process more difficult. From 2002 to 2021, only 34% of naturalization applications were approved, and the process may take years. Israel may justify the rejection for any of a wide variety of reasons such as a family member owning land or having a utility bill in the West Bank, posting the Palestinian flag or mentioning the Nakba on social media, a past failed Hebrew proficiency test, refusal to renounce Jordanian citizenship, minor criminal charges, or "security impediments".

==== 2003 Citizenship and Entry into Israel Law ====
On 31 July 2003, Israel enacted the Citizenship and Entry into Israel Law (Temporary Provision), 5763–2003, a one-year amendment to Israel's Citizenship Law denying citizenship and Israeli residence to Palestinians who reside in the West Bank or Gaza Strip and who marry Israelis; the rule has been waived for any Palestinian "who identifies with the State of Israel and its goals, when he or a member of his family has taken concrete action to advance the security, economy or any other matter important to the State". Defenders of the Citizenship and Entry Law say it is aimed at preventing terrorist attacks and preserving the "Jewish character" of Israel by restricting Arab immigration. The new bill was formulated in accordance with Shin Bet statistics showing that involvement in terror attacks declines with age. This newest amendment, in practice, removes restrictions from half of the Palestinian population requesting legal status through marriage in Israel. This law was upheld by a High Court decision in 2006.

===== Discriminatory/racist character =====
Although this law theoretically applies to all Israelis, it has disproportionately affected Arab citizens of Israel; Arabs are far more likely to have Palestinian spouses than other Israelis. Thus the law has been widely considered discriminatory and the United Nations Committee on the Elimination of Racial Discrimination has unanimously approved a resolution saying that the Israeli law violated an international human rights treaty against racism.

===== Extensions and current status quo =====
Upon expiration the law was extended for six months in August 2004, and again for four months in February 2005. On 8 May 2005, the Israeli ministerial committee for issues of legislation once again amended the Citizenship and Entry into Israel Law, to restrict citizenship and residence in Israel only to Palestinian men over the age of 35, and Palestinian women over the age of 25.

The law expired in 2021 and about 12,700 Palestinians married to Israeli Arab citizens are able to apply for citizenship but Israel has delayed all family reunification requests, maintaining the status quo.

=== Civil rights ===
The Israeli Declaration of Independence stated that the State of Israel would ensure complete equality of social and political rights to all its inhabitants irrespective of religion, race or sex, and guaranteed freedom of religion, conscience, language, education and culture. While formally equal according to Israeli law, a number of official sources acknowledge that Arab citizens of Israel experience discrimination in multiple aspects of life. Israeli High Court Justice (Ret.) Theodor Or wrote in The Report by the State Commission of Inquiry into the Events of October 2000:

The Arab citizens of Israel live in a reality in which they experience discrimination as Arabs. This inequality has been documented in a large number of professional surveys and studies, has been confirmed in court judgments and government resolutions, and has also found expression in reports by the state comptroller and in other official documents. Although the Jewish majority's awareness of this discrimination is often quite low, it plays a central role in the sensibilities and attitudes of Arab citizens. This discrimination is widely accepted, both within the Arab sector and outside it, and by official assessments, as a chief cause of agitation.

The Or Commission report also states that activities by Islamic organizations may be using religious pretenses to further political aims. The commission describes such actions as a factor in 'inflaming' the Muslim population in Israel against the authorities, and cites the al-Sarafand mosque episode, with Muslims' attempts to restore the mosque and Jewish attempts to stop them, as an example of the 'shifting of dynamics' of the relationship between Muslims and the Israeli authorities.

According to the 2004 U.S. State Department Country Reports on Human Rights Practices for Israel and the Occupied Territories, the Israeli government had done "little to reduce institutional, legal, and societal discrimination against the country's Arab citizens".

The 2004 U.S. State Department Country Reports on Human Rights Practices notes that:

- "Israeli-Arab advocacy organizations have challenged the Government's policy of demolishing illegal buildings in the Arab sector, and claimed that the Government was more restrictive in issuing building permits in Arab communities than in Jewish communities, thereby not accommodating natural growth."
- "In June, the Supreme Court ruled that omitting Arab towns from specific government social and economic plans is discriminatory. This judgment builds on previous assessments of disadvantages suffered by Arab Israelis."
- "Israeli-Arab organizations have challenged as discriminatory the 1996 "Master Plan for the Northern Areas of Israel," which listed as priority goals increasing the Galilee's Jewish population and blocking the territorial contiguity of Arab towns."
- "Israeli Arabs were not required to perform mandatory military service and, in practice, only a small percentage of Israeli Arabs served in the military. Those who did not serve in the army had less access than other citizens to social and economic benefits for which military service was a prerequisite or an advantage, such as housing, new-household subsidies, and employment, especially government or security-related industrial employment. The Ivri Committee on National Service has issued official recommendations to the Government that Israel Arabs not be compelled to perform national or 'civic' service, but be afforded an opportunity to perform such service."
- "According to a 2003 University of Haifa study, a tendency existed to impose heavier prison terms to Arab citizens than to Jewish citizens. Human rights advocates claimed that Arab citizens were more likely to be convicted of murder and to have been denied bail."
- "The Orr Commission of Inquiry's report ... stated that the 'Government handling of the Arab sector has been primarily neglectful and discriminatory,' that the Government 'did not show sufficient sensitivity to the needs of the Arab population, and did not take enough action to allocate state resources in an equal manner.' As a result, 'serious distress prevailed in the Arab sector in various areas. Evidence of distress included poverty, unemployment, a shortage of land, serious problems in the education system, and substantially defective infrastructure.'"

The 2007 U.S. State Department Country Reports on Human Rights Practices notes that:

- "According to a 2005 study at Hebrew University, three times more money was invested in education of Jewish children as in Arab children."

Human Rights Watch has charged that cuts in veteran benefits and child allowances based on parents' military service discriminate against Arab children: "The cuts will also affect the children of Jewish ultra-orthodox parents who do not serve in the military, but they are eligible for extra subsidies, including educational supplements, not available to Palestinian Arab children."

According to the Guardian, in 2006 just 5% of civil servants were Arabs, a number of them hired to deal with other Arabs, despite the fact that Arab citizens of Israel comprise 20% of the population.

Although the Bedouin infant mortality rate is still the highest in Israel, and one of the highest in the developed world, The Guardian reports that in the 2002 budget, Israel's health ministry allocated Arab communities less than 1% of its budget for healthcare facility development.

In March 2010, a report released by several Israeli civil rights groups stated that the current Knesset was "the most racist in Israeli history" with 21 bills proposed in 2008 and 2009 that would discriminate against the country's Arab minority.

A preliminary report commissioned by Israel's Courts Administration and the Israel Bar Association found in 2011 that Israeli Arabs are more likely than Israeli Jews to be convicted of crimes after being charged, more likely to be given custodial sentences, and were given longer sentences. It did not account for "mitigating or aggravating circumstances, prior criminal record and the convict's gender".

=== Property ownership and housing ===
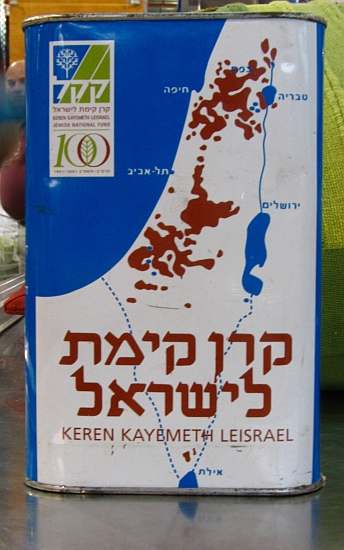
JNF collection boxes were used in Jewish communities around the world to collect donations for buying lands, planting forests and settling Jews in Israel.

The Jewish National Fund (JNF) is a private organization established in 1901 to buy and develop land in the Land of Israel for Jewish settlement; land purchases were funded by donations from world Jewry exclusively for that purpose. The JNF currently owns 13% of land in Israel, while 80% is owned by the government, and the rest, around 7%, is evenly divided between private Arab and Jewish owners. Thus, the Israel Land Administration (ILA) administers 94% of the land in Israel. A significant portion of JNF lands were originally properties left behind by Palestinian "absentees" and as a result the legitimacy of some JNF land ownership has been a matter of dispute. The JNF purchased these lands from the State of Israel between 1949 and 1953, after the state took control of them according to the Absentee Properties Law. While the JNF charter specifies the land is for the use of the Jewish People, land has been leased to Bedouin herders. Nevertheless, JNF land policy has been criticized as discrimination. When the ILA leased JNF land to Arabs, it took control of the land in question and compensated the JNF with an equivalent amount of land in areas not designated for development (generally in the Galilee and the Negev), thus ensuring that the total amount of land owned by the JNF remains the same. This was a complicated and controversial mechanism, and in 2004 use of it was suspended. After Supreme Court discussions and a directive by the Attorney General instructing the ILA to lease JNF land to Arabs and Jews alike, in September 2007 the JNF suggested reinstating the land-exchange mechanism.

While the JNF and the ILA view an exchange of lands as a long-term solution, opponents say that such maneuvers privatize municipal lands and preserve a situation in which significant lands in Israel are not available for use by all of its citizens. As of 2007, the High Court delayed ruling on JNF policy regarding leasing lands to non-Jews, and changes to the ILA-JNF relationship were up in the air. Adalah and other organizations furthermore express concern that proposed severance of the relation between the ILA and JNF, as suggested by Ami Ayalon, would leave the JNF free to retain the same proportion of lands for Jewish uses as it seeks to settle hundreds of thousands of Jews in areas with a tenuous Jewish demographic majority (in particular, 100,000 Jews in existing Galilee communities and 250,000 Jews in new Negev communities via the Blueprint Negev).

The Israel Land Administration, which administers 93% of the land in Israel (including the land owned by the Jewish National Fund), refuses to lease land to non-Jewish foreign nationals, who include Palestinian residents of Jerusalem who have identity cards but are not citizens of Israel. When ILA land is "bought" in Israel it is actually leased to the "owner" for a period of 49 years. According to article 19 of the ILA lease, foreign nationals are excluded from leasing ILA land, and in practice foreigners may just show that they qualify as Jewish under the Law of Return.

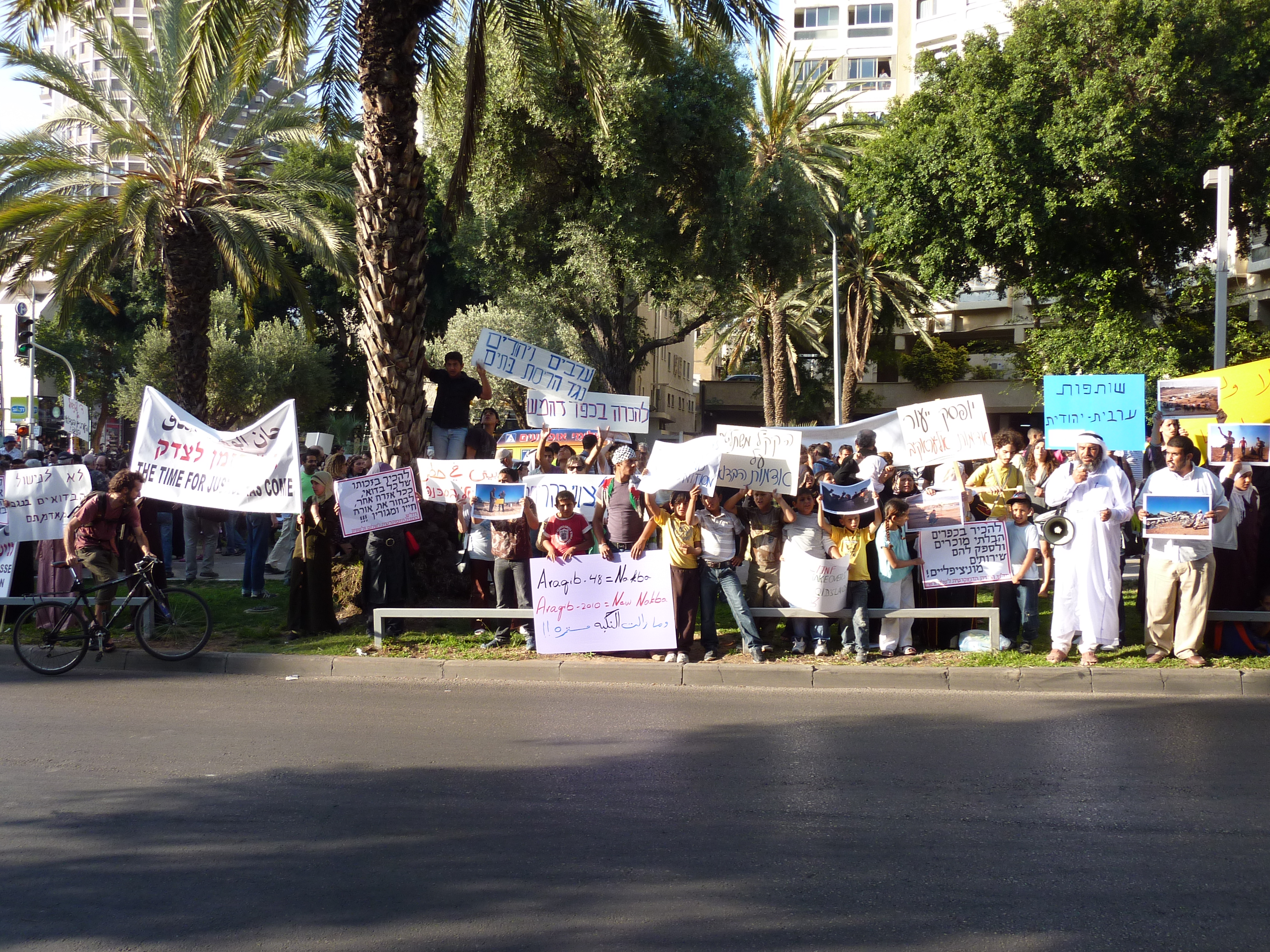
Bedouins protesting in Tel Aviv in demand to return to their village, Al-Araqeeb, 12 May 2010

Israeli law also discriminates between Jewish and Arab residents of Jerusalem regarding rights to recover property owned before the dislocations created by the 1948 Arab–Israeli War. The 1950 Absentees Property Law said that any property within post-war Israel which was owned by an Arab who had left the country between 29 November 1947 and 19 May 1948, or by a Palestinian who had merely been abroad or in area of Palestine held by hostile forces up to 1 September 1948, lost all rights to that property. Palestinians who fled or were expelled from their homes by Jewish or Israeli forces, before and during the 1948 Arab–Israeli war, but remained within the borders of what would become Israel, that is, those currently known as Arab citizens of Israel, are deemed present absentees by the legislation. Present absentees are regarded as absent by the Israeli government because they left their homes, even if they did not intend to leave them for more than a few days, and even if they did so involuntarily.

Following the 1967 Six-Day War in which Israel occupied the West Bank, from where it annexed East Jerusalem, Israel then passed in 1970 the Law and Administration Arrangements Law allowing for Jews who had lost property in East Jerusalem and the West Bank during the 1948 war to reclaim it. Palestinian residents of Jerusalem (absentees) in the same positions, and Arab Israelis (present absentees), who owned property in West Jerusalem or other areas within the state of Israel, and lost it as a result of the 1948 war, cannot recover their properties. Israeli legislation, therefore, allows Jews to recover their land, but not Arabs.

In the early 2000s, several community settlements in the Negev and the Galilee were accused of barring Arab applicants from moving in. In 2010, the Knesset passed legislation that allowed admissions committees to function in smaller communities in the Galilee and the Negev, while explicitly forbidding committees to bar applicants based on the basis of race, religion, sex, ethnicity, disability, personal status, age, parenthood, sexual orientation, country of origin, political views, or political affiliation. Critics, however, say the law gives the privately run admissions committees a wide latitude over public lands, and believe it will worsen discrimination against the Arab minority.

=== Contesting allegations of discrimination ===
While groups are not separated by official policy, Israel has a number of different sectors within the society that maintain their strong cultural, religious, ideological, and/or ethnic identity. The Israeli foreign ministry maintains that in spite of the existing social cleavages and economic disparities, the political systems and the courts represent strict legal and civic equality. The Israeli foreign ministry in 2006 described the country as: "Not a melting-pot society, but rather more of a mosaic made up of different population groups coexisting in the framework of a democratic state".

According to Ishmael Khaldi, an Arab citizen of Israel and the nation's first high-ranking Muslim in the Israeli foreign service, while Israeli society is far from perfect, minorities in Israel fare far better than any other country in the Middle East. He wrote:

I am a proud Israeli – along with many other non-Jewish Israelis such as Druze, Bahai, Bedouin, Christians and Muslims, who live in one of the most culturally diversified societies and the only true democracy in the Middle East. Like America, Israeli society is far from perfect, but let us deal honestly. By any yardstick you choose – educational opportunity, economic development, women and gay's rights, freedom of speech and assembly, legislative representation – Israel's minorities fare far better than any other country in the Middle East.

—

=== Opposition to intermarriage ===
Intermarriage is prohibited by the Jewish Halakha. In the case of mixed Arab-Jewish marriages, emotions run especially high. A 2007 poll found that more than half of Israeli Jews believed intermarriage was equivalent to national treason. Around 2009 a group of Jewish men in the Jerusalem neighborhood of Pisgat Ze'ev started patrolling the neighborhood to stop Jewish women from dating Arab men. In 2008 the municipality of Petah Tikva had a telephone hotline for friends and family to report Jewish girls who date Arab men as well as psychologists to provide counselling. The city of Kiryat Gat launched a campaign in schools to warn Jewish girls against dating local Bedouin men.

A 2015 survey found that 82% of Israeli Muslims, 87% of Israeli Druze, and 88% of Israeli Christians would be uncomfortable with a child of theirs marrying a Jew. 97% of Israeli Jews would be uncomfortable if a child of theirs married a Muslim and 89% would be uncomfortable if a child of theirs married a Christian.

In 2018, Arab-Israeli journalist Lucy Aharish married Jewish-Israeli actor Tzachi HaLevy, triggering a public controversy. A number of Israeli right-wing politicians, such as Oren Hazan, criticized HaLevy's marriage to an Arab Muslim woman as "assimilation" while multiple members of the Knesset, including other government officials, congratulated the couple and dismissed their colleagues as racist.

=== Knesset ===
The Mossawa Center – an advocacy organization for Arabs in Israel – blames the Knesset of discrimination against Arabs, citing a 75% increase in discriminatory and racist bills submitted to the Knesset in the year 2009. According to the report, 11 bills deemed by the center to be "discriminatory and racist" were placed on the legislature's table in 2007, while 12 such bills were initiated in 2008. However, in 2009 a full 21 bills deemed discriminatory by the Mossawa Center were discussed in the Knesset.

The reports categorizes as "racist" proposals such as giving academic scholarships to soldiers who served in combat units, and a bill to revoke government funding from organizations acting "against the principles of the State". The Coalition Against Racism and the Mossawa Center said that the proposed legislation seeks to de-legitimize Israel's Arab citizens by decreasing their civil rights.

== Economic status ==
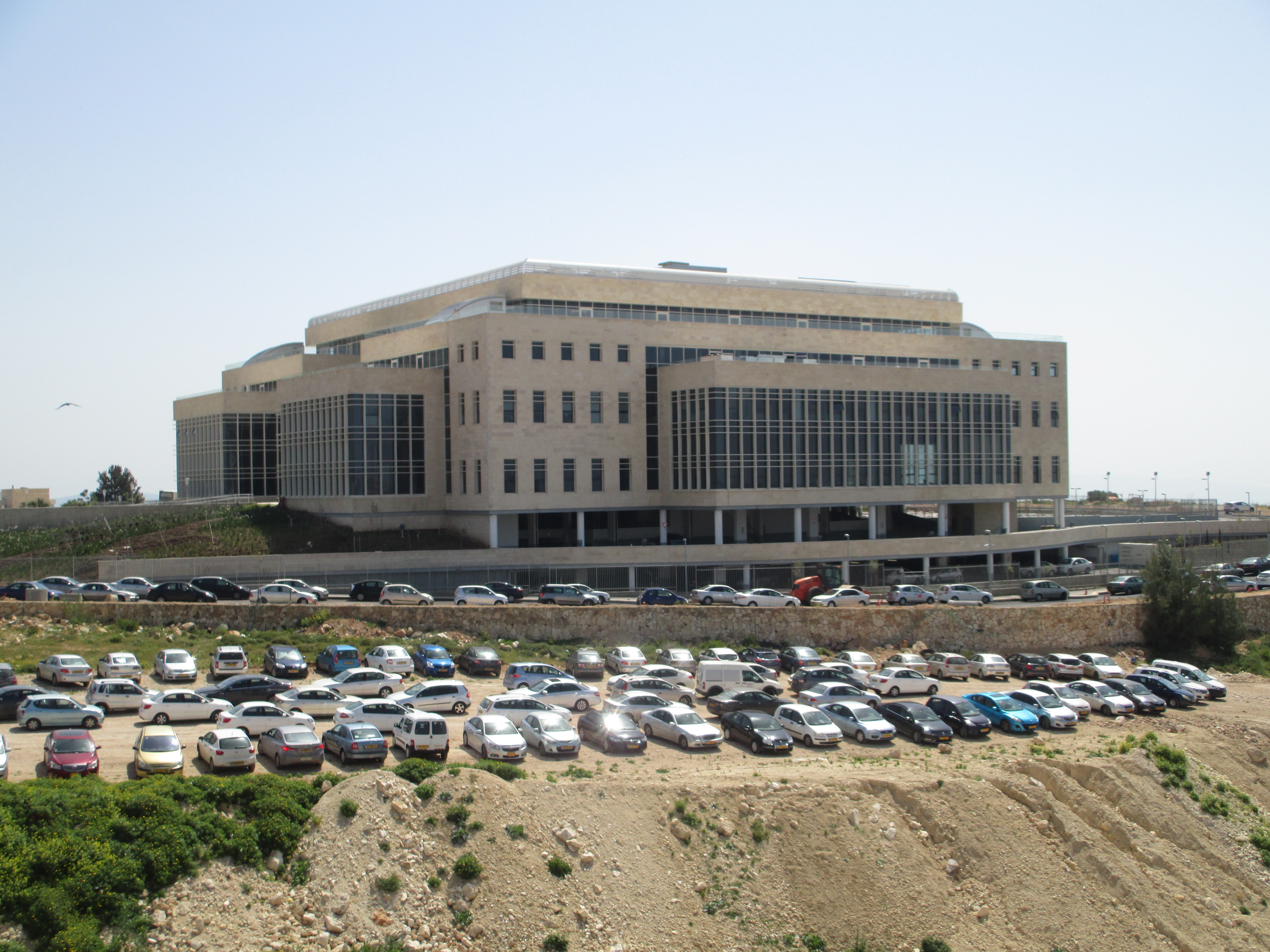
Nazareth Hi-Tech Park; the city has been called the "Silicon Valley of the Arab community".

=== Poverty, unemployment, and government assistance: from Israel’s founding to the 2000s ===
Inequality in the allocation of public funding for Jewish and Arab needs, and widespread employment discrimination, present significant economic hurdles for Arab citizens of Israel. On the other hand, the Minorities at Risk (MAR) group states that "despite obvious discrimination, Israeli Arabs are relatively much better off economically than neighboring Arabs."

The predominant feature of the Arab community's economic development after 1949 was its transformation from a predominantly peasant farming population to a proletarian industrial workforce. It has been suggested that the economic development of the community was marked by distinct stages. The first period, until 1967, was characterised by this process of proletarianisation. From 1967 on, economic development of the population was encouraged and an Arab bourgeoisie began to develop on the margin of the Jewish bourgeoisie. From the 1980s on, the community developed its economic and, in particular, industrial potential.

In July 2006, the Government categorized all Arab communities in the country as 'class A' development areas, thus making them eligible for tax benefits. This decision aims to encourage investments in the Arab sector.

Raanan Dinur, director-general of Prime Minister office, said in December 2006 that Israel had finalized plans to set up a NIS 160 million private equity fund to help develop the businesses of the country's Arab community over the next decade. According to Dinur, companies owned by Arab citizens of Israel will be eligible to apply to the fund for as much as NIS 4 million (US$952,000), enabling as many as 80 enterprises to receive money over the next 10 years. The Israeli government will, according to Dinur, solicit bids to operate the fund from various financial institutes and private firms, which must pledge to raise at least NIS 80 million (about US$19 million) from private investors.

In February 2007, The New York Times reported that 53 percent of the impoverished families in Israel were Arabs. Since the majority of Arabs in Israel do not serve in the army, they are ineligible for multiple financial benefits such as scholarships and housing loans.

Arab towns in Israel are reluctant to collect city taxes from their residents. Sikkuy, a prominent Arab-Jewish NGO, found that Arabs as a group have the highest home ownership in Israel: 93% compared to 70% among Jews.

While per capita income is lower in the Arab community, these figures do not take into account age (the average age in the Arab community is lower and young people earn less), the low percentage of women who join the workforce, and the large size of Arab families.

In 2005, of the 40 towns in Israel with the highest unemployment rates, 36 were Arab towns. According to the Central Bank of Israel statistics for 2003, salary averages for Arab workers were 29% lower than for Jewish workers. Difficulties in procuring employment have been attributed to a comparatively low level of education vis-a-vis their Jewish counterparts, insufficient employment opportunities in the vicinity of their towns, discrimination by Jewish employers, and competition with foreign workers in fields, such as construction and agriculture. Arab women have a higher unemployment rate in the work force relative to both religious and secular Jewish women. While among Arab men the employment was found to be on par with Jewish men, 17% of Arab women were found to be employed. This puts the Arab employment at 68% of the Israeli average. The Druze and Christian Arabs have higher employment than Muslims.

=== Socio-economic advancements: from 2010s onward ===
In March 2010, the government approved a $216 million, five-year development plan for the Israeli Arab sector with the goal of increasing job accessibility, particularly for women and academics. Under this program, some 15,000 new employees will be added to the work roster by 2014.

By the 2010s, the Israeli-Arab standard of living was found to be improving, with the number of middle class Arabs growing. In 2017, Haaretz, which termed Arabs as Israel's "new yuppies", reported that Arabs, especially women, were pursuing higher education in increasing numbers, and increasingly seeking white-collar jobs. According to Professor Aziz Haidar of the Hebrew University of Jerusalem, in 2017 about 27% of Arabs were middle class (as opposed to 17% two decades before) and 3% were wealthy, and although most Arabs were still in lower-income brackets, the Arab middle class is expanding dramatically.

Across all groups, Arab Christians tend to be the most educated, and most of them are middle and upper middle class, and they have the lowest incidence of poverty and the lowest percentage of unemployment; a study published by the Taub Center for Social Policy Studies in 2017 found that "Christian population has the highest achievements in the Arab sector on all indices: bagrut scores, rates of college graduates, and fields of employment". The study found also that the achievements of the Druze are mixed, and they have the second highest achievements in the Arab sector on all indices. While Bedouins has the lowest achievements in the Arab sector on all indices, as they tend to be the least educated.

==== High-tech sector ====
In 2011, Nazareth had over 15 Arab-owned high-tech companies, mostly in the field of software development. According to the Haaretz newspaper the city has been called the "Silicon Valley of the Arab community" in view of its potential in this sphere.

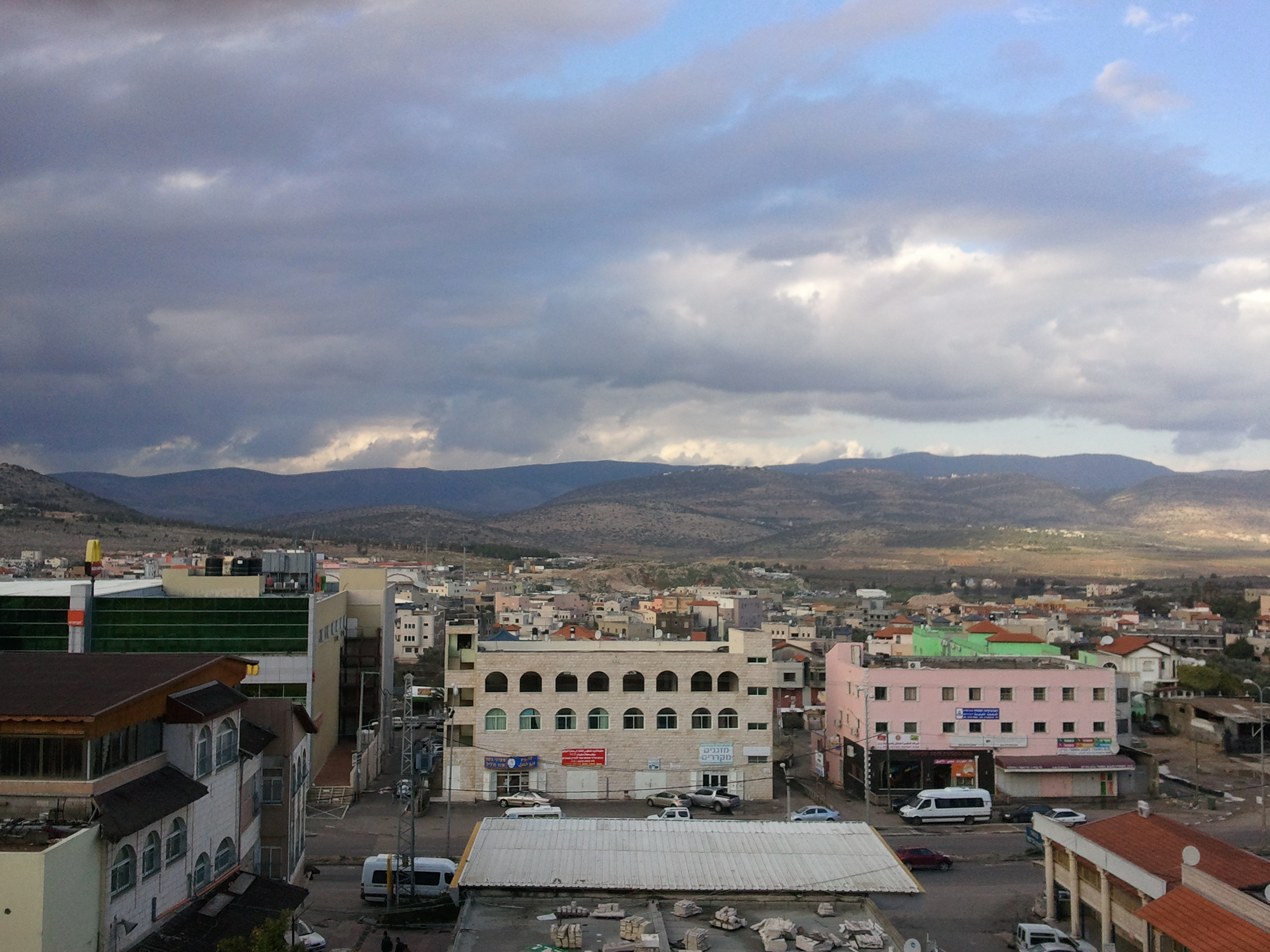
Sakhnin industrial area

Imad Telhami, founder and CEO of Babcom, a call center in the Tefen Industrial Park with 300 employees, is committed to developing career opportunities for Arab workers in Israel. Telhami, a Christian Arab, was a senior executive at the Delta Galil Industries textile plant before establishing Babcom. He hopes to employ 5,000 workers within five years: "Israeli companies have been exporting thousands of jobs to India, Eastern Europe and other spots around the globe. I want to bring the jobs here. There are terrific engineers in the Arab sector, and the potential is huge.

== Health ==
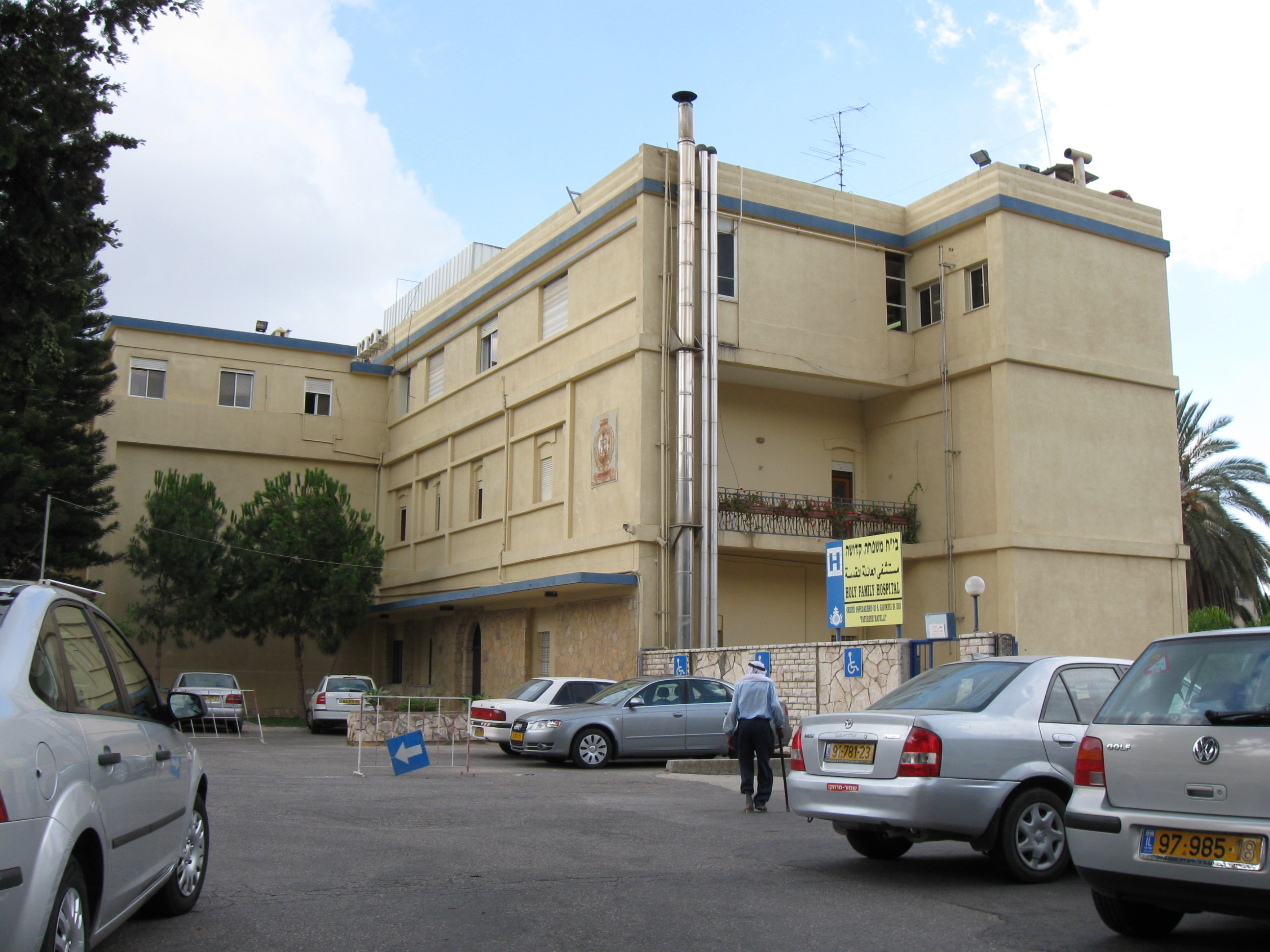
The Italian Nazareth Hospital

=== Health issues ===
The most common health-related causes of death are heart disease and cancer. Roughly 14% were diagnosed with diabetes in 2000. Around half of all Arab men smoke. Life expectancy has increased 27 years since 1948. Further, due largely to improvements in health care, the Arab infant mortality rate dropped from 32 deaths per thousand births in 1970 to 8.6 per thousand in 2000. However, the Bedouin infant mortality rate is still the highest in Israel, and one of the highest in the developed world.

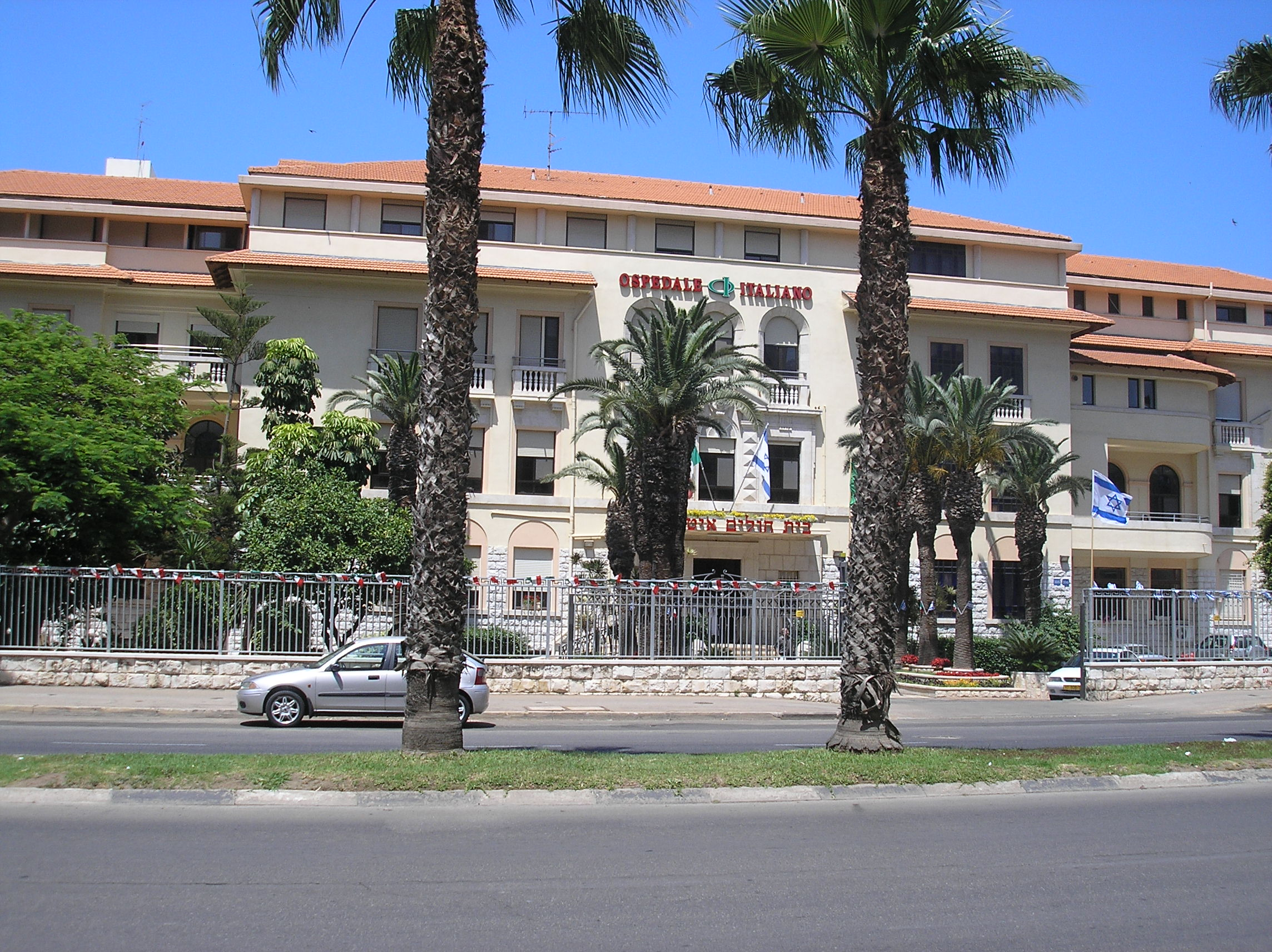
The Italian Hospital in Haifa

In 2003, the infant mortality rate among Arab citizens overall was 8.4 per thousand, more than twice as high as the rate 3.6 per thousand among the Jewish population. In the 2002 budget, Israel's health ministry allocated Arab communities less than 1% of its 277 m-shekel (£35m) budget (1.6 m shekels {£200,000}) to develop healthcare facilities.

=== Presence in the Israeli healthcare system ===
Nazareth have three private hospitals serving its districts: The Nazareth Hospital (also called the English Hospital), French Nazareth Hospital, and the Italian Nazareth Hospital. All of these hospitals run by the Christian community of Nazareth. The Christian Arab community run also the Italian Hospital in Haifa.

Despite the fact that Arab represent 20% of the total Israeli population, in 2015 they accounted 35% of all doctors in Israel, and according to a study by the Tel Aviv University Arabs account about 35% of all pharmacists in Israel. A 2025 research article published in an Israeli journal estimated that, as of 2023, Arabs comprised 21% of Israel's population but accounted for 25% of its physicians, 27% of both nurses and dentists, and 49% of pharmacists. This represents a significant rise since 2010, particularly among physicians, whose share increased from 8% to 25%. The Arabic local council Arraba has one of the highest numbers of doctors per capita in the world.

== Education ==
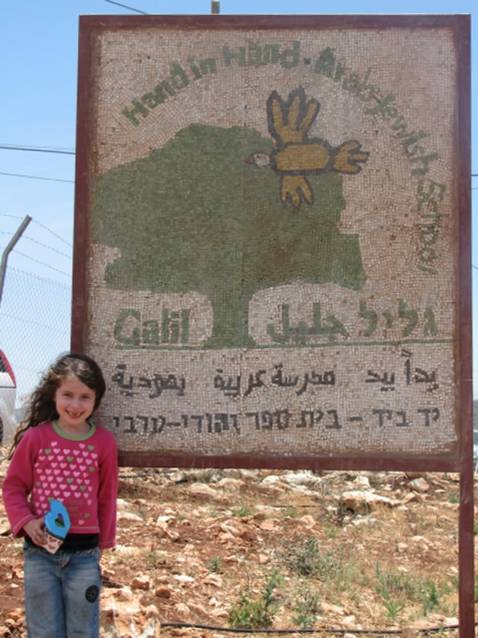
Sign in front of the Galil school, a joint Arab-Jewish primary school in Israel

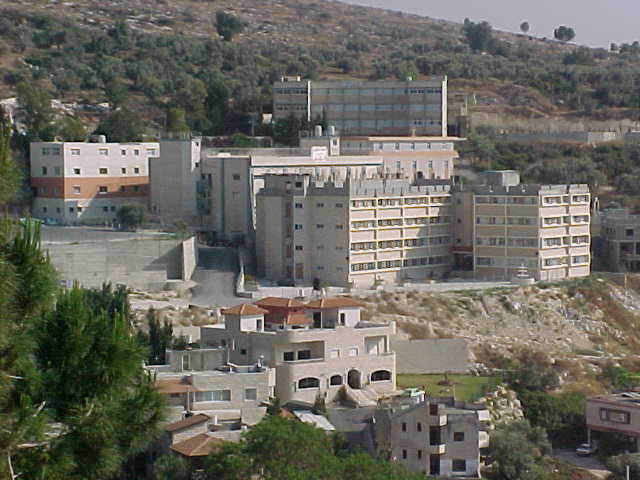
Mar Elias, a kindergarten, elementary, junior high, and high school, and college in Ibillin, an Arab village in northern Israel.

The Israeli government regulates and finances most of the schools operating in the country, including the majority of those run by private organizations. The school system has two branches, Hebrew-speaking and Arabic-speaking. The curricula for the two systems are almost identical in mathematics, sciences, and English. It is different in humanities (history, literature, etc.). Hebrew is taught in Arabic schools from third grade and obligatory for Arabic-speaking school's matriculation exams, a basic knowledge of Arabic is taught in Hebrew schools, usually from the 7th to the 9th grade. Arabic is not obligatory for Hebrew speaking school's matriculation exams. The schooling language split operates from preschool to the end of high school. At the university level, they merge into a single system, which operates mostly in Hebrew and in English.

In 2001, Human Rights Watch described government-run Arab schools as "a world apart from government-run Jewish schools." The report found striking differences in virtually every aspect of the education system.

In 2005, the Follow-Up Committee for Arab Education said that the Israeli government spent an average of $192 a year on Arab students compared to $1,100 for Jewish students. The drop-out rate for Arabs was twice as high as for Jews (12% versus 6%). There was a 5,000-classroom shortage in the Arab sector.

According to the 2004 U.S. State Department Country Reports on Human Rights Practices for Israel and the occupied territories, "Israeli Arabs were underrepresented in the student bodies and faculties of most universities and in higher professional and business ranks. Well educated Arabs often were unable to find jobs commensurate with their level of education. According to Sikkuy, Arab citizens held approximately 60 to 70 of the country's 5,000 university faculty positions."

Arab educators have long voiced concerns over institutionalized budgetary discrimination. An August 2009 study published by the Hebrew University's School of Education claimed that Israel's Education Ministry discriminated against Arabs in its allocations of special assistance for students from low socioeconomic backgrounds and the average per-student allocation at Arab junior high schools was one-fifth the average at Jewish ones. This was due to the allocation method: funds were first divided between Arab and Jewish school systems according to the number of students in each, and then allocated to needy students; however, due to the large proportion of such students in the Arab sector, they receive less funds, per student, than Jewish students. The Ministry of Education said it was discontinuing this method in favor of a uniform index. Ministry data on the percentage of high school students who passed their matriculation exams showed that Arab towns were ranked lowest except for Fureidis, which had the third highest pass rate (76%) in Israel.

According to the study by Hanna David from the University of Tel Aviv, Arab Christian schools in Israel are among the best schools in the country, and while those schools represent only 4% of the Arab schooling sector, about 34% of Arab university students come from Christian schools, and about 87% of the Israeli Arabs in the high tech sector have been educated in Arab Christian schools. These 47 Arab Christian schools accommodate 33,000 Christian students, Muslims, Druze and some Jews from across the country.

=== Higher education ===
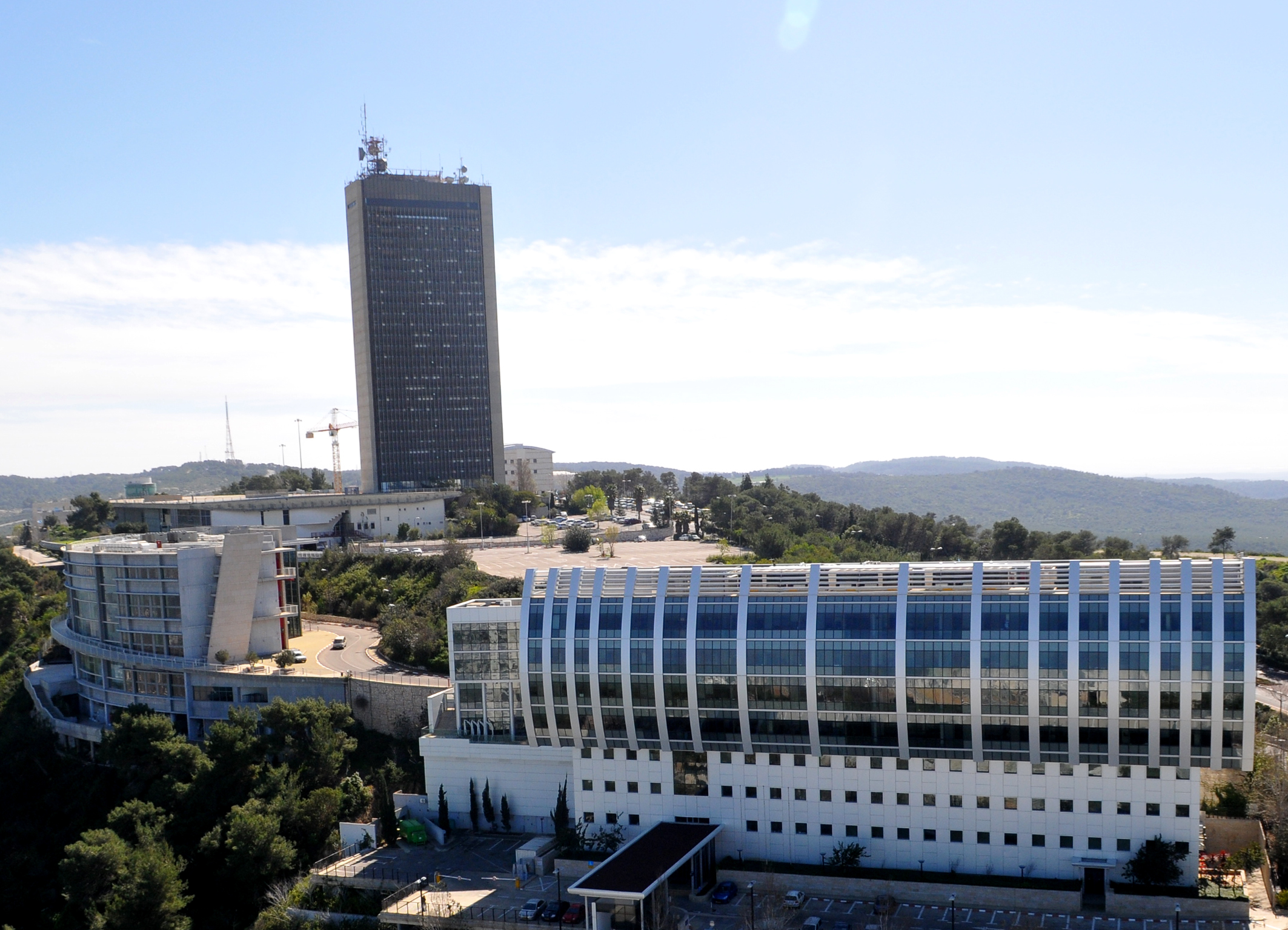
The percentage of Arab students at the University of Haifa is around 41%.

Nearly half of Arab students who passed their matriculation exams failed to win a place in higher education because they performed poorly in the Psychometric Entrance Test, compared to 20% of Jewish applicants. Khaled Arar, a professor at Beit Berl College, believes the psychometric test is culturally biased: "The gap in psychometric scores between Jewish and Arab students has remained steady – at more than 100 points out of a total of 800 – since 1982. That alone should have raised suspicions."

However, a 1986 research found negligible differences in construct or predictive test validity across varying cultural groups and the findings appeared to be more consistent with the psychometric than with the cultural bias position.

According to the Israeli Central Bureau of Statistics census in 2020, 83.6% of Christians were entitled to a matriculation certificate, followed by Druze (79.9%), and Muslims (60.3%). While 80.2% of the Israeli Jews were entitled to a matriculation certificate.

Statistically, Christian Arabs in Israel have the highest rates of educational attainment among all religious communities, according to a data by Israel Central Bureau of Statistics in 2010, 63% of Israeli Christian Arabs have had college or postgraduate education, the highest of any religious and ethno-religious group. According to the Israeli Central Bureau of Statistics census in 2020, 70.9% of Christians in Israel have a college degree, followed by Druze (15.3%), and Muslims (10%).

Among Israeli higher education institutions the University of Haifa has the largest percentage (41%) of Arab-Israeli students. The Technion Israel Institute of Technology has the second largest percentage (22.2%) of Arab-Israeli students.

=== Teaching staff in Hebrew schools ===
As of 2026, data from the Central Bureau of Statistics indicated that the number of Arab teachers employed in the Hebrew-language education system had increased steadily over the past decade, reaching nearly 4,000 and accounting for approximately 4% of the workforce. By the early 2020s, close to half of Hebrew-language public schools employed at least one Arab teacher, and the proportion of Arab teachers among new hires continued to rise.

== Military conscription ==
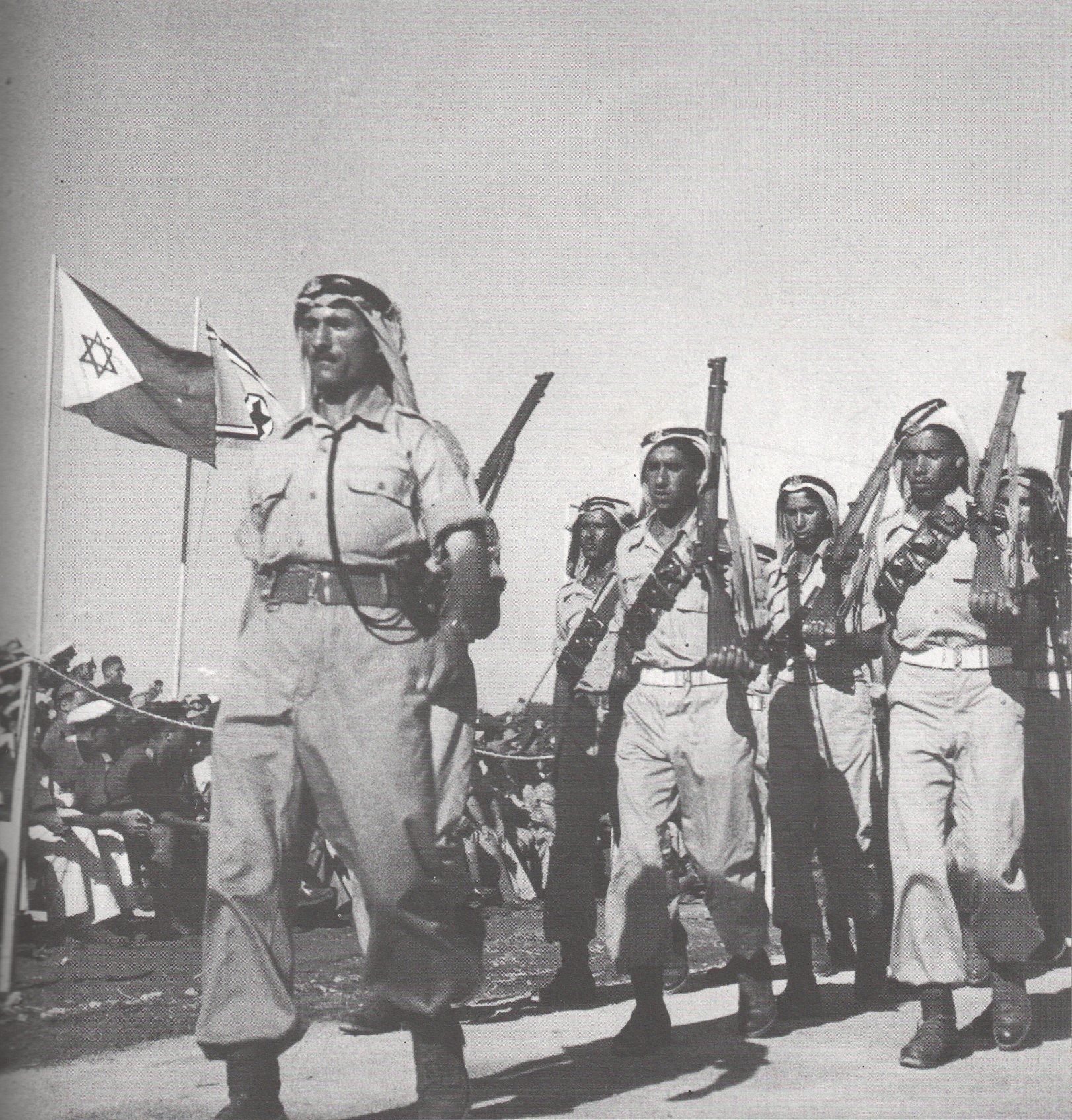
Bedouin IDF soldiers of Rumat al-Heib (عرب الهيب) during a military parade in Tel-Aviv in June 1949

Unlike their Jewish counterparts, Arab citizens are not required to serve in the Israeli military, and, outside the Bedouin community, few (around 120 a year) volunteer. Until 2000, each year between 5–10% of the Bedouin population of draft age volunteered for the Israel Defense Forces (IDF), and Bedouin were well known for their unique status as volunteers. The legendary Israeli soldier, Amos Yarkoni, first commander of the Shaked Reconnaissance Battalion in the Givati Brigade, was a Bedouin (born Abd el-Majid Hidr). Bedouin soldiers dominate the elite human tracking units that guard Israel's northern and southern border. Lieutenant Colonel Magdi Mazarib, a Bedouin, who is the Israeli army's highest-ranking tracking commander, told the AFP that he believes that "the state of Bedouin in Israel is better, as far as the respect we get, our progress, education". In 2004 the number of Bedouin in the army may have been be less than 1%. A 2003 report stated that willingness among Bedouin to serve in the army had drastically dropped in recent years, as the Israeli government has failed to fulfill promises of equal service provision to Bedouin citizens. However, a 2009 article in Haaretz stated that volunteer recruitment for a crack elite Bedouin army unit rose threefold.

IDF figures indicate that, in 2002 and 2003, Christians represented 0.1 percent of all recruits. In 2004, the number of recruits had doubled. Altogether, in 2003, the percentage of Christians serving had grown by 16 percent over the year 2000. The IDF does not publish figures on the exact number of recruits by religious denomination, and in 2005 it was estimated that a few dozen Christians currently served in the IDF.

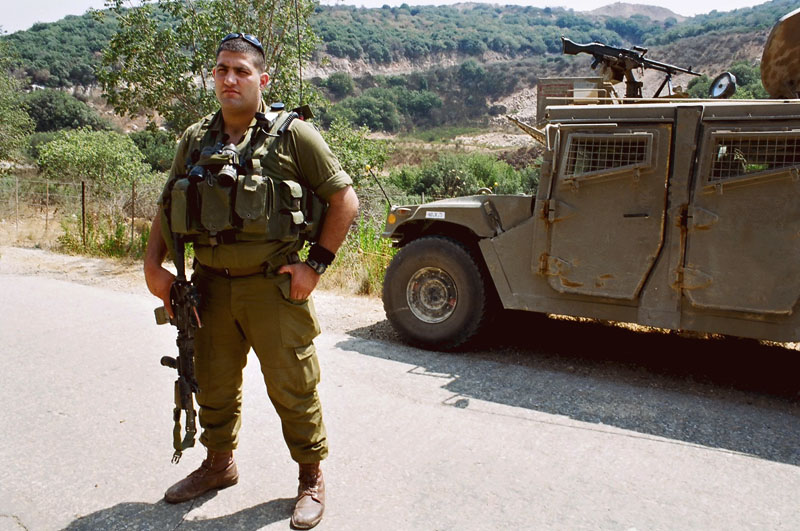
Druze commander of the IDF Herev battalion

The Druze are required to serve in the IDF in accordance with an agreement between their local religious leaders and the Israeli government in 1956. Opposition to the decision among the Druze populace was evident immediately, but was unsuccessful in reversing the decision. Multiple Druze in the IDF become officers and some rising to general officer rank. In recent years, a growing minority from within the Druze community have denounced this mandatory enrollment, and refused to serve. In 2001, Said Nafa, who identifies as a Palestinian Druze and serves as the head of the Balad party's national council, founded the "Pact of Free Druze", an organization that aims "to stop the conscription of the Druze and claims the community is an inalienable part of the Arabs in Israel and the Palestinian nation at large".

=== National service ===
Rather than perform army service, Israeli Arab youths have the option to volunteer to national service and receive benefits similar to those received by discharged soldiers. The volunteers are generally allocated to Arab populations, where they assist with social and community matters. As of 2010 there are 1,473 Arabs volunteering for national service. According to sources in the national service administration, Arab leaders are counseling youths to refrain from performing services to the state. According to a National Service official: "For years the Arab leadership has demanded, justifiably, benefits for Arab youths similar to those received by discharged soldiers. Now, when this opportunity is available, it is precisely these leaders who reject the state's call to come and do the service, and receive these benefits."

== Intercommunal relations ==
=== Surveys and polls ===
In a 2004 survey by Sammy Smooha of the University of Haifa Jewish-Arab Center, 85% of Israeli Arabs stated that Israel has a right to exist as an independent state, and 70% that it has a right to exist as a democratic, Jewish state. A Truman Institute survey from 2005 found that 63% of the Arab citizens accepted the principle that Israel is the state of the Jewish people.

A 2006 poll by the Arab advocacy group the Center Against Racism showed negative attitudes towards Arabs. The poll found that 63% of Jews believe Arabs are a security threat; 68% would refuse to live in the same building as an Arab; 34% believe that Arab culture is inferior to Israeli culture. Support for segregation between Jewish and Arab citizens was higher among Jews of Middle Eastern origin.

Israeli patriotism among Israeli Arabs, 2006
Very patriotic	17%
Patriotic	7%
Somewhat patriotic	35%
Not especially patriotic	41%
Herzliya patriotism survey

In a 2006 patriotism survey, 56% of Israeli Arabs were not proud of their citizenship and 73% were not ready to fight to defend the state, but 77% said that Israel was better than most other countries and 53% were proud of the country's welfare system. 82% said they would rather be a citizen of Israel than of any other country in the world.

An Israeli Democracy Institute (IDI) poll in 2007 showed that 75% of "Israeli Arabs would support a constitution that maintained Israel's status as a Jewish and democratic state while guaranteeing equal rights for minorities, while 23% said they would oppose such a definition". Another survey that year showed that 62% of Israel's Arabs would prefer to remain Israeli citizens rather than become citizens of a future Palestinian state. A separate 2008 poll found that 77% would rather live in Israel than in any other country in the world. Another 2007 poll by Sammy Smooha found that 63% of Jewish Israelis avoided entering Arab towns and cities; 68% feared the possibility of widespread civil unrest among Israeli Arabs; 50% of Israeli Arabs justified Hezbollah's capture of IDF reservists Ehud Goldwasser and Eldad Regev in a cross-border raid; 19% thought Israel was justified in going to war following the kidnapping; 48% justified Hezbollah rocket attacks on northern Israel during the 2006 Lebanon War; 89% of Israeli Arabs saw the IDF bombing of Lebanon as a war crime, while 44% of Israeli Arabs viewed Hezbollah's bombing of Israel as a war crime; 62% of Israeli Arabs worried that Israel could transfer their communities to the jurisdiction of a future Palestinian state, and 60% said they were concerned about a possible mass expulsion; 76% of Israeli Arabs described Zionism as racist; 68% of Israeli Arabs would be content to live in the Jewish state alongside a Palestinian state in the West Bank and Gaza Strip; 41% of Israeli Arab citizens denied the Holocaust ever happened.

In 2007, the Association for Civil Rights in Israel reported a "dramatic increase" in racism against Arab citizens, including a 26% rise in anti-Arab incidents. ACRI president Sami Michael said that "Israeli society is reaching new heights of racism that damages freedom of expression and privacy".

A 2008 poll on intercommunal relations by Harvard Kennedy School found that Arabs and Jews in Israel underestimated the extent to which their communities "liked" one another. 68% of the Jews supported teaching Arabic in Jewish schools.

A 2008 poll by the Center Against Racism found that 75% of Israeli Jews would not live in a building with Arabs; over 60% would not invite Arabs to their homes; 40% believed that Arabs should be stripped of the right to vote; over 50% agreed that the state should encourage emigration of Arab citizens to other countries; 59% considered Arab culture primitive. Asked "What do you feel when you hear people speaking Arabic?" 31% said hate and 50% said fear. Only 19% reported positive or neutral feelings.

Surveys in 2009 found a radicalization in the positions of Israeli Arabs towards the State of Israel, with 41% of Israeli Arabs recognizing Israel's right to exist as a Jewish and democratic state (down from 66% in 2003), and 54% believing Israel has a right to exist as an independent country (down from 81% in 2003). Polls also showed that 40% of Arab citizens engaged in Holocaust denial.

A 2010 poll of Israeli high school students found that 50% did not think Israeli Arabs were entitled to the same rights as Jews in Israel, and 56% thought Arabs should not be elected to the Knesset. The figures rose among religious students.

A 2010 Arab Jewish Relations Survey, compiled by Prof. Sami Smoocha in collaboration with the Jewish-Arab Center at the University of Haifa shows that 71% Arab citizens of Israel said they blamed Jews for the hardships suffered by Palestinians during and after the "Nakba" in 1948. 38% denied the Holocaust. The percentage supporting the use of violence to advance Arab causes climbed from 6% in 1995 to 12% in 2010. 66% say they reject Israel as a Jewish and Zionist state, while 30% opposed its existence under any terms. 63% saw the Jews as "foreign settlers who do not fit into the region and will eventually leave, when the land will return to the Palestinians".

A 2010 University of Maryland / Zogby International poll of 600 Arab Israelis compiled by Shibley Telhami found that 36% considered their Arab identity to be "most important", while 22% answered "Palestinian", 19% Muslim, and 12% Israeli.

Amongst other things, a 2012 survey by Mada al-Carmel, the Arab Center for Applied Social Research, asked Arab students what obstacles they felt they faced in getting into university: 71% said the psychometric exam was the primary obstacle, while 40% cited "Jewish racism". The survey also found that 45% of those questioned felt no pride in Israeli achievements in whatever field, with another 13% reporting negative feelings about them.

A Pew Research poll released in March 2016 showed that close to half of all Israeli Jews are in favor of "transferring or expelling" Israel's Arab population. 48% of Israeli Jews strongly agree or agree with the idea, and 46% strongly disagree or disagree. The in-person polling was conducted in a relatively "calm" period from late 2014 through early 2015.

In December 2022, support for a two-state solution was 33% among Palestinians, 34% among Israeli Jews, and 60% among Israeli Arabs. At the end of October 2023, after the Hamas-led attack on Israel, the two-state solution had the support of 71.9% of Israeli Arabs and 28.6% of Israeli Jews. According to a poll published by the Israel Democracy Institute, only 24% of Israeli Arabs believe that the IDF is trying to uphold international law in the war between Israel and Hamas.

In December 2023, during the Israel-Hamas war, the Druze were the Israeli Arab minority which most identified with the state of Israel (80%), followed by Christians (73%) and Muslims (62%). For residents of the Negev, most of whom are Bedouin, the figure was 73%.

=== Violence against Arab citizens in Israel ===
Alexander Yakobson of Jerusalem's Hebrew University has said "There is very little actual violence between Israeli Jews and Israeli Arabs. Given the length and the intensity of the conflict, that is both surprising and encouraging."

In the 1956 Kafr Qasim massacre, 48 unarmed Arab citizens, returning to their village, were gunned down by an Israel Border Police platoon; a curfew had been imposed, but the villagers were not informed of it. Arab citizens have also been killed by Israeli security forces in the wake of violent demonstrations and riots, such as the March 1976 Land Day demonstrations, which left 6 dead, and the October 2000 events in which 12 Israeli Arabs and one Palestinian from Gaza were killed.

In 2005 an AWOL IDF soldier, Eden Natan-Zada opened fire in a bus in Shefa-Amr in northern Israel, murdering four Arabs and wounding twenty-two others. No group had taken credit for the terrorist attack and an official in the settler movement denounced it.

Arab activists have complained about the police abandoning Arab towns to intra communal violence at the hands of common criminals and murderers, calling for cooperation with Israeli police and internal security services under the slogan of "Arab Lives Matter".

=== Arab victims of terrorism ===
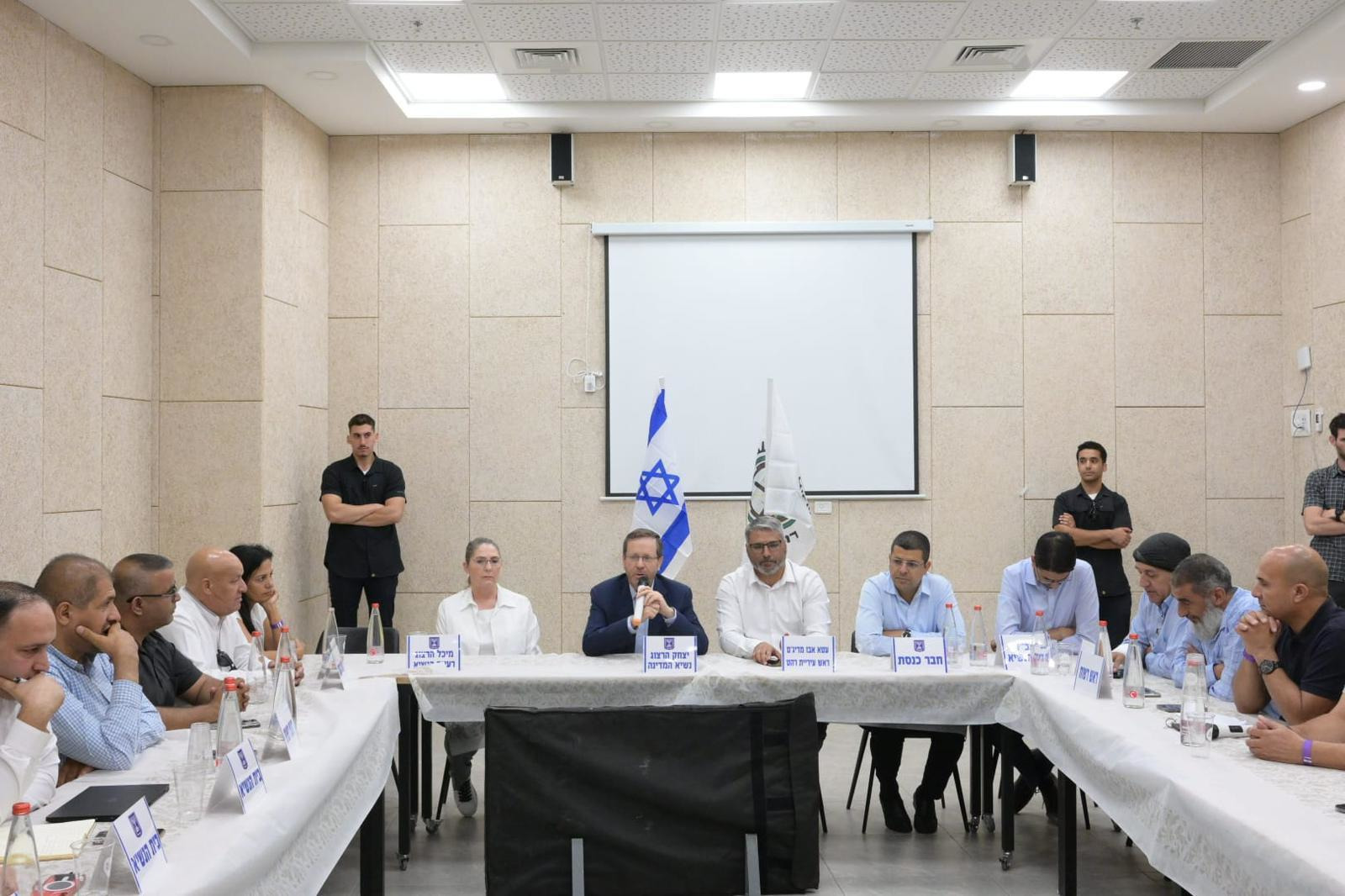
Israeli President Isaac Herzog in the city of Rahat with heads of the Bedouin community and families of kidnapped and murdered Bedouins during the Hamas-led attack on Israel on 7 October 2023

Arab citizens have also been victims of Palestinian, Arab, or Islamist attacks on Israel and Israelis. For example, on 12 September 1956, three Druze guards were killed in an attack on Ein Ofarim, in the Arabah region. Two Arab citizens were killed in the Ma'alot massacre carried out by the Democratic Front for the Liberation of Palestine on 15 May 1974. In March 2002, a resident of the Arab town of Tur'an was killed in an attack on a Haifa restaurant. Two months later, a woman from Jaffa was killed in a Hamas suicide bombing in Rishon LeZion. On 18 June 2002, a woman from the Arab border town of Barta'a was one of 19 killed by Hamas in the Pat Junction Bus Bombing in Jerusalem. In August 2002, a man from the Arab town of Mghar and woman from the Druze village of Sajur were killed in a suicide bombing at Meron junction. On 21 October 2002, an Isfiya man and a Tayibe woman were among 14 killed by Islamic Jihad in the Egged bus 841 massacre. On 5 March 2003, a 13-year-old girl from the Druze town of Daliyat al-Karmel was one of 17 killed in the Haifa bus 37 suicide bombing. In May 2003, a Jisr az-Zarqa man was killed in an Afula mall suicide bombing. On 19 March 2004, Fatah al-Aqsa Martyrs' Brigades gunmen killed George Khoury, a Hebrew University student. On 12 December 2004, five Arab IDF soldiers were killed in an explosion and shooting at the border with Egypt for which the Fatah Hawks claimed responsibility. On 4 October 2003, four Arab citizens of Israel were among the 21 killed by Hanadi Jaradat in the Maxim restaurant suicide bombing. In July 2006, 19 Arab citizens were killed due to Hezbollah rocket fire in the course of the 2006 Lebanon War.

On 22 August 2006, 11 Arab tourists from Israel were killed when their bus overturned in Egypt's Sinai Peninsula. Israel sent Magen David Adom, but the ambulances waited for hours at the border before receiving Egyptian permission to enter and treat the wounded, responsible for at least one of the deaths. The victims say that the driver acted as part of a planned terrorist attack, and are attempting to receive compensation from the government.

== Relations with other Palestinians ==
During the 2021 Israel–Palestine crisis, according to Al Arabiya, Fatah backed a call for a general strike on 18 May 2021 in the West Bank, including East Jerusalem and Palestinians in Israel were asked to take part. In an unusual display of unity by "Palestinian citizens of Israel, who make up 20% of its population, and those in the territories Israel seized in 1967" (Note: Pro-Palestinian activists have dubbed the May 2021 Palestinian reaction to Israeli policies in Sheikh Jarrah and the Al-Aqsa compound as the "Unity Intifada." The term denotes the national solidarity and religious duty shared by the resisting Palestinians in Gaza, the West Bank, Eastern Jerusalem, and Israel.) the strike went ahead and "shops were shuttered across cities in Gaza, the occupied West Bank and in villages and towns inside Israel".

== Culture ==
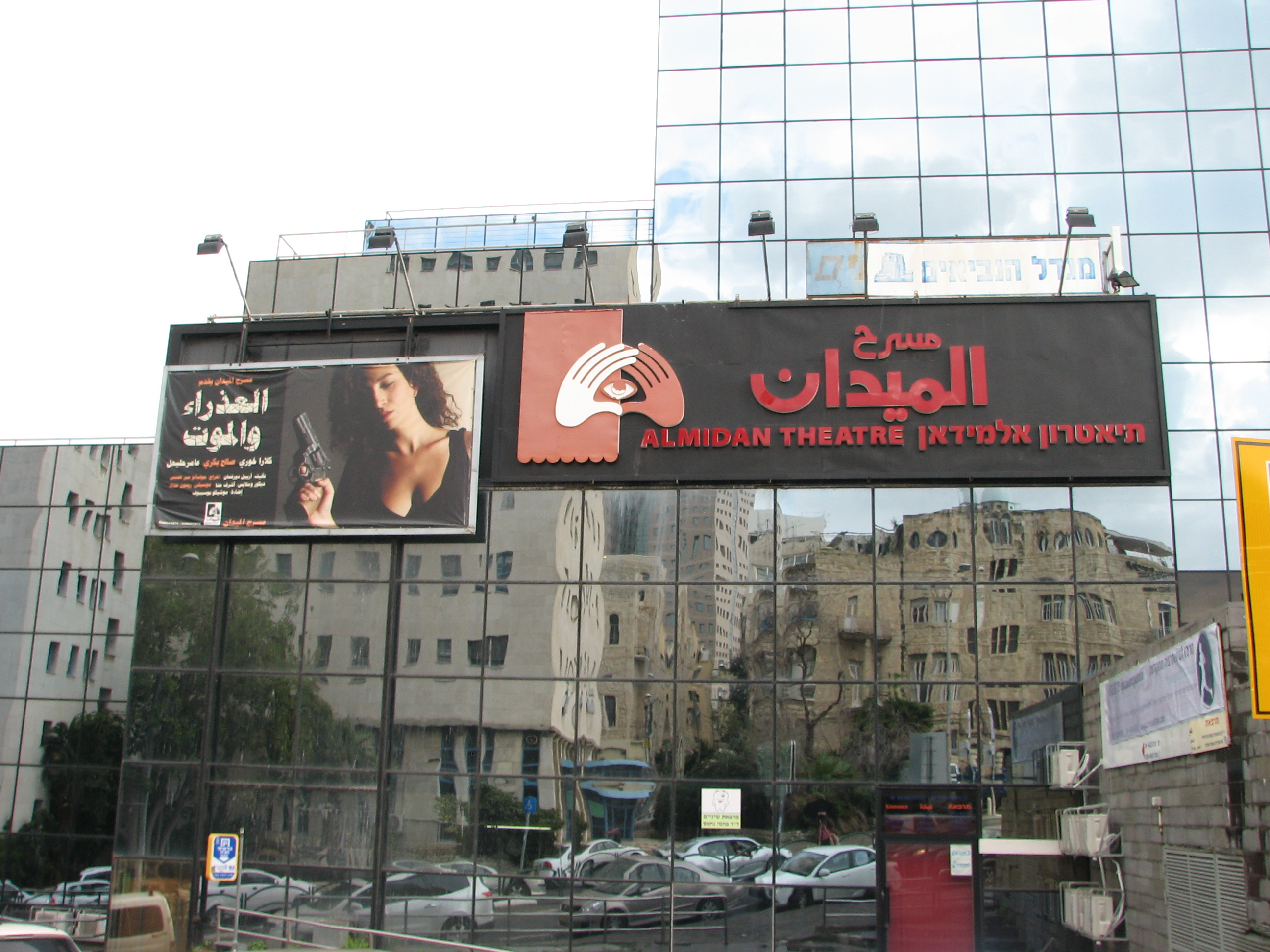
Al-Midan Theater in Haifa

Many Arab citizens of Israel share in the culture of the Palestinian people and wider Arab region of which a number of them form a part. There are still some women who produce Palestinian cultural products such as Palestinian embroidery, and costume. The Palestinian folk dance, known as the dabke, continues to be taught to youth in cultural groups, and is often danced at weddings and other parties.

=== Cultural centers ===
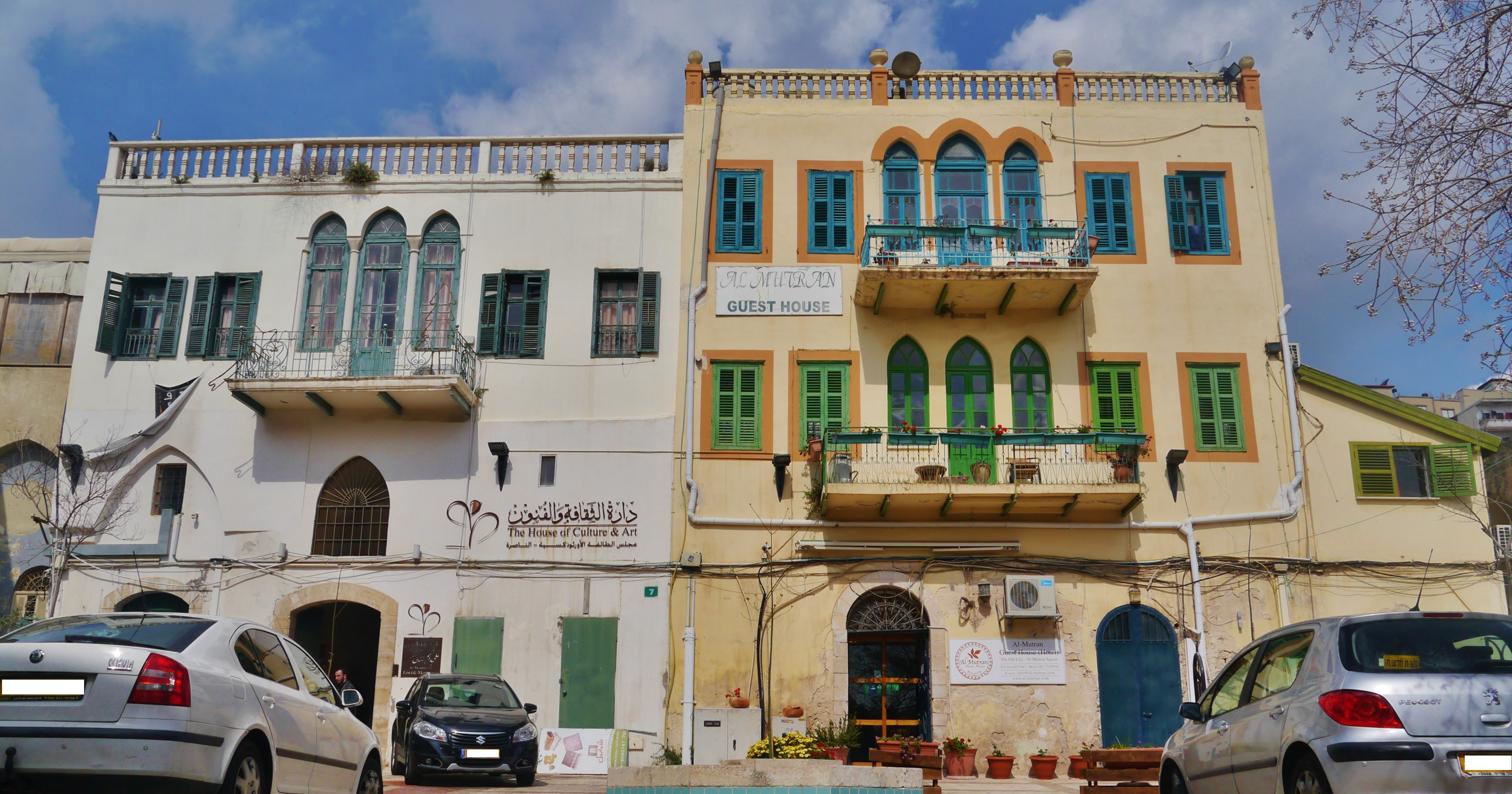
The house of culture and art in Nazareth

As the largest Arab city in Israel, Nazareth is a cultural, political, economic and commercial center of the Arab citizens of Israel, and became also a center of Arab and Palestinian nationalism. Haifa, however, is the center of liberal Arabic-speaking culture, as it was under British colonial rule. Arabs in Haifa (mostly Christians and Muslims) tend to be wealthier and better educated compared to Arabs elsewhere in Israel. An active Arab cultural life has developed in the 21st century. Haifa is center of a number of Arab-owned businesses such as theaters, bars, cafes, restaurants and nightclubs which host also a different cultural discussions and art exhibitions.

Other centers of Arab and Palestinian cultures includes Kafr Yasif and Rameh. According to the historian Atallah Mansour, Kafr Yasif is the "most academic Arab town in Israel", while journalist Sylvia Smith calls it "the preeminent [Arab] cultural town". With the near total depopulation of the Palestinian Arabs in the major cities of Haifa and Jaffa as a result of the 1948 war, Kafr Yasif and Rameh became one of a few villages in the newly established state of Israel to emerge as a central space for Arab culture and politics. Its schools, proximity and location between major cities and other Arab villages, the relatively equal distribution of land ownership among its households and the diversity brought about by the influx of internally displaced Palestinians all contributed to its local importance.

In 1948, it was the only Arab locality in the Galilee to contain a high school outside of the cities of Nazareth, Shefa-Amr and Haifa. Following the war, the high school enrolled students from over fifty Arab villages. Several students, including Mahmoud Darwish, became well-known poets, and the village hosted weekly poetry recitals. As of the 1960s, the people of Rameh have been noted for their high levels of education and standards of living.

=== Language ===
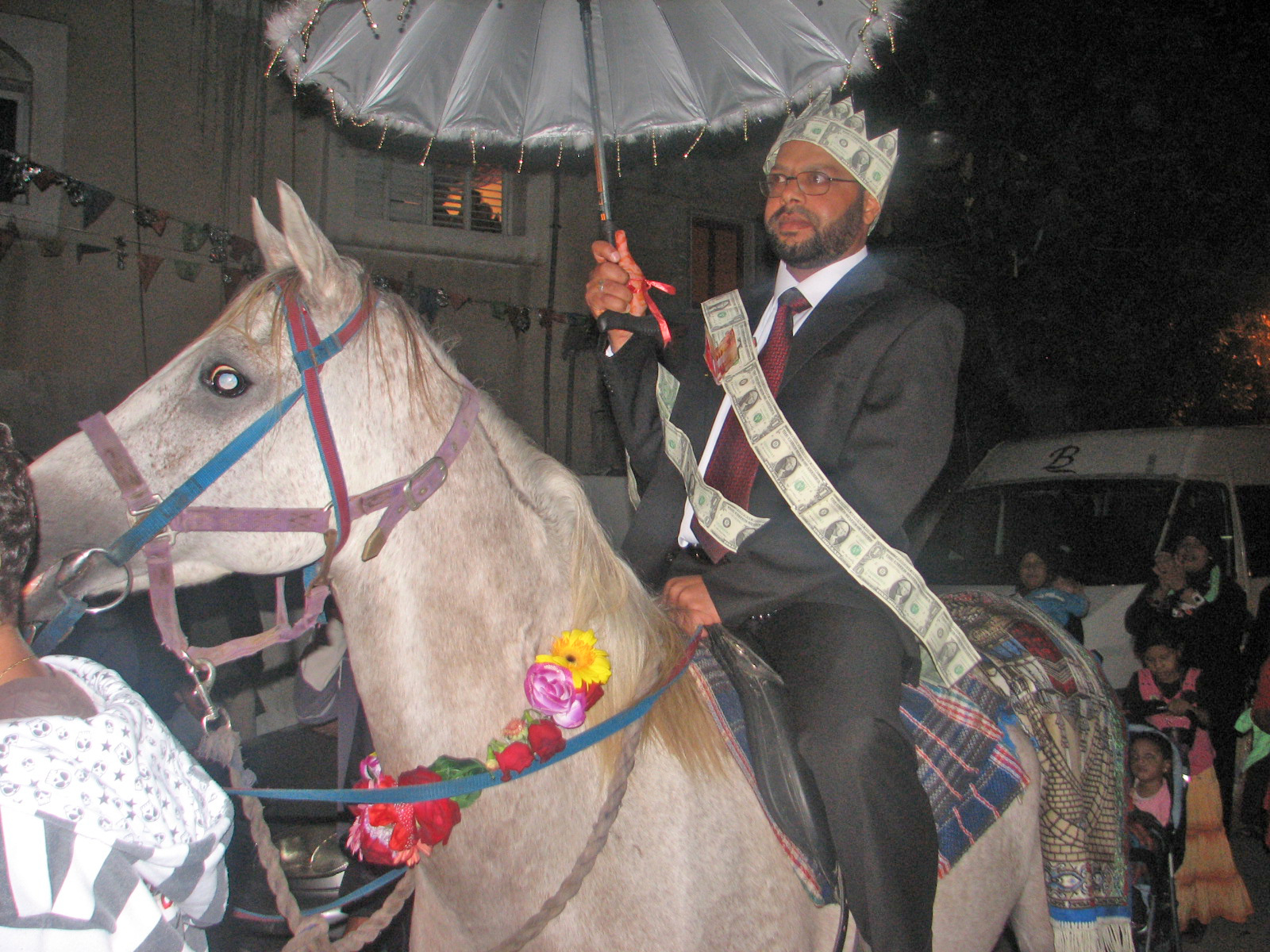
A wedding groom and his horse, Jisr az-Zarka, 2009

Linguistically speaking, the majority of Arabic citizens of Israel are fluently bilingual, speaking both a Palestinian Arabic dialect and Hebrew. In Arab homes and towns, the primary language spoken is Arabic. Some Hebrew words have entered the colloquial Arabic dialect. For example, Arabs often use the word beseder (equivalent of "Okay") while speaking Arabic. Other Hebrew words that are regularly interspersed are ramzor (stoplight), mazgan (air conditioner), and mahshev (computer). The resulting dialect is usually referred to as 'Israeli Arabic'.

Such borrowings are often "Arabized" to reflect not only Arabic phonology but the phonology of Hebrew as spoken by Arabs. For example, the second consonant of מעונות (me'onot, "dormitory") would be pronounced as a voiced pharyngeal fricative rather than the glottal stop traditionally used by the vast majority of Israeli Jews. A survey by the Central Bureau of Statistics released in 2013 found that 60% of Israeli Arabs were proficient or highly proficient in Hebrew, while 17% could not read it and 12% could not speak it.

There are different local colloquial dialects among Arabs in different regions and localities. For example, the Little Triangle residents of Umm al-Fahm are known for pronouncing the kaph sound with a "ch" (as-in-cheese) rather than "k" (as-in-kite). Some Arabic words or phrases are used only in their respective localities, such as the Nazareth word for "now" which is issa, and silema a local modification of the English word "cinema". The Druze Arabic dialect, especially in the villages, is often different from the other regional Israeli Arabic dialects. Druze Arabic dialect is distinguished from others by retention of the phoneme /qāf/. They often use Hebrew characters to write their Arabic dialect online.

Arab citizens of Israel tend to watch both the Arab satellite news stations and Israeli cable stations and read both Arabic and Hebrew newspapers, comparing the information against one another.

=== Music and art ===
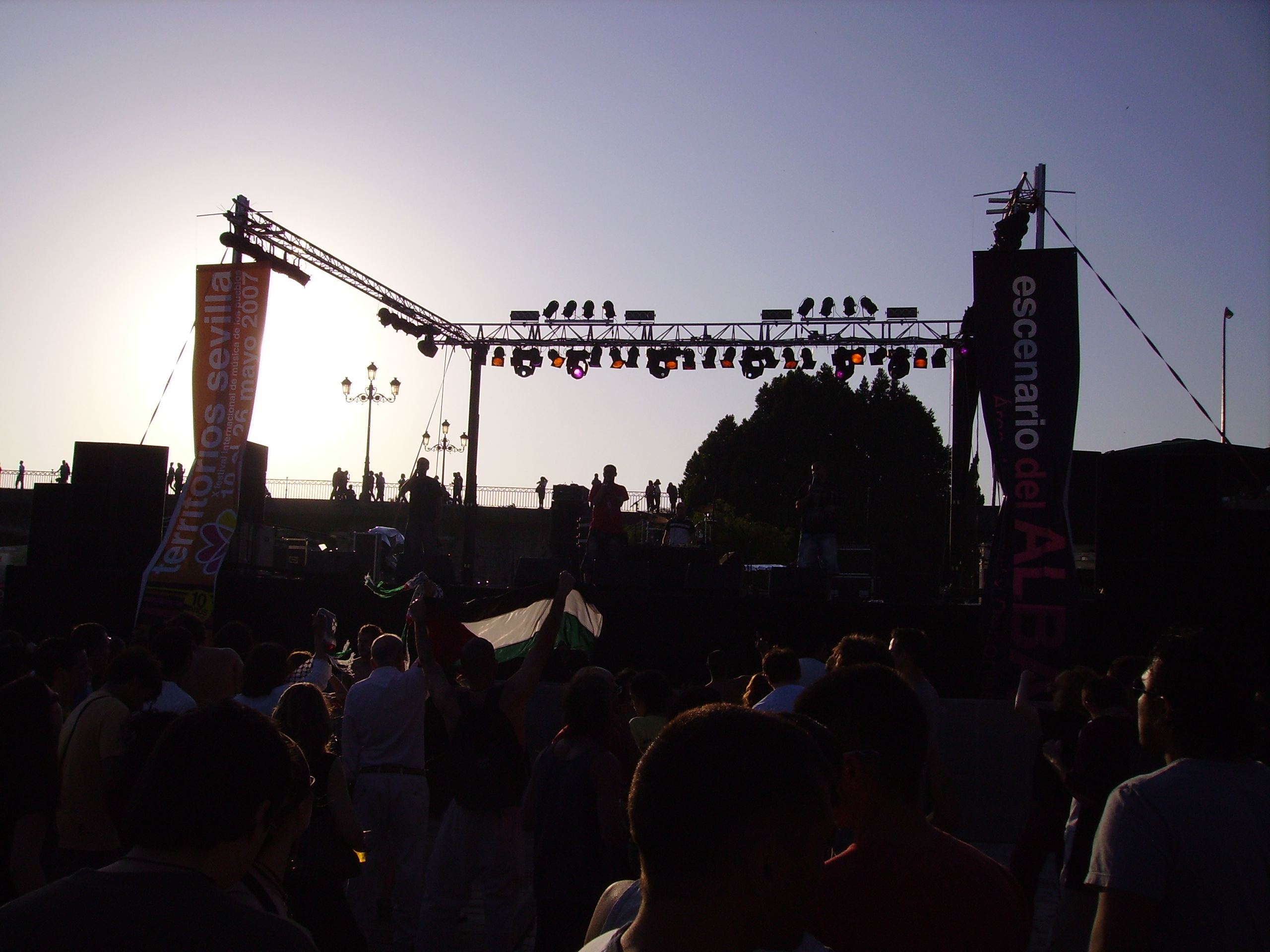
DAM band

The Palestinian art scene in general has been supported by the contributions of Arab citizens of Israel. In addition to the contribution of artists such as singer Rim Banna (from Nazareth) and Amal Murkus (from Kafr Yasif) to evolving traditional Palestinian and Arabic music styles, a new generation of Arab youth in Israel has also begun asserting a Palestinian identity in new musical forms. For instance of the Palestinian hip hop group DAM, from Lod, has spurred the emergence of other hip hop groups from Akka, to Bethlehem, to Ramallah, to Gaza City. DAM is the first Palestinian hip hop group.

Singer-songwriter such as Nasrin Kadri, Mira Awad, Lina Makhul, Luay Ali, Sharif "the druze boy" have put Arab citizens of Israel on the musical map.

In the art scene, the Palestinian minority in Israel has asserted its identity according to Ben Zvi, who suggests that this group of artists who are identified "on the one hand, as part of a broad Palestinian cultural system, and on the other — in a differentiated manner — as the Palestinian minority in Israel." The issue of identity becomes particularly clear in an artwork of the Palestinian artist Raafat Hattab from Jaffa. The video performance "untitled" was part of the exhibition "Men in the Sun" in the Herzliya Museum of Contemporary Art in 2009. In the work, Raafat Hattab is seen as he pours water into a bucket in order to lengthily water an olive tree which is a sign for the lost paradise before 1948. The scene is primed by the song Hob (Love) by the Lebanese Ahmad Kaabour which expresses the need for Palestinian solidarity. The chorus repeats the phrase "I left a place" and it seems as if the video is dealing with memory. But as the camera zooms out, the spectator realizes that Hattab and the olive tree both actually stand in the middle of the Rabin Square, a main place in Tel Aviv, and the water used for watering the tree comes from the nearby fountain. "In my installations I appear in different identities that combined are my identity — a Palestinian minority in Israel and a queer minority in the Palestinian culture", explains Rafaat Hattab in an interview with the Tel Avivian City Mouse Magazine. Asim Abu Shaqra's focus of the sabra plant (prickly pear cactus) in his paintings is another example of the centrality of identity, especially vis-a-vie the Palestinian subject's Israeli counterpart, in Palestinian art. Tal Ben Zvi writes that Abu Shaqra is one of the few Palestinian artists, who have succeeded in entering the canon of Israeli art. Abu Shaqra painted various paintings featuring the sabra, both a symbol for the Palestinian Nakba and a symbol for the new Israeli and his work stirred up a debate in the Israeli art discourse over the image of the sabra in Israeli culture and over questions of cultural appropriation and ownership of this image.

=== Cuisine ===
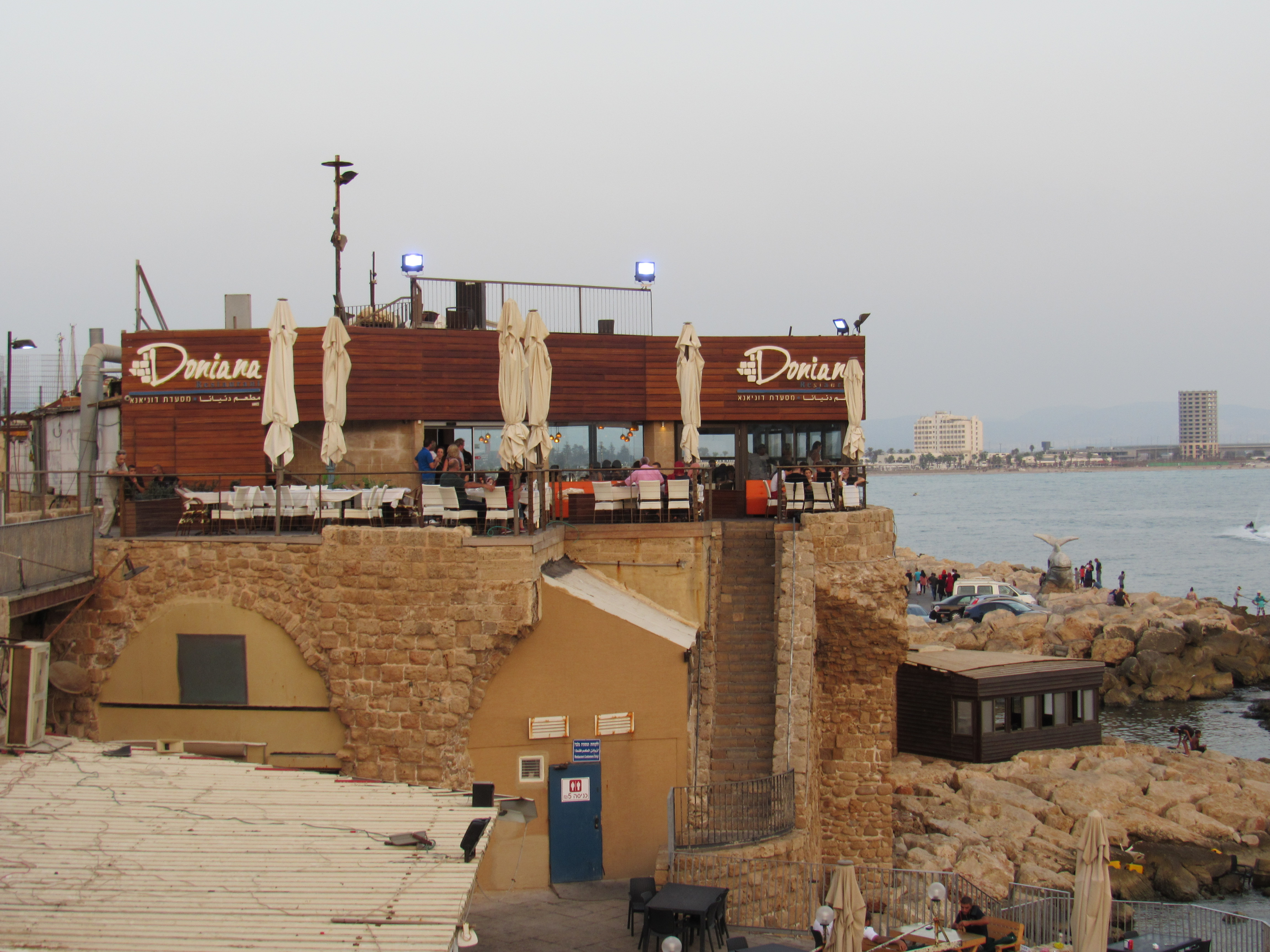
"Doniana" is a popular Arab seafood restaurant in Acre

Arab cuisine in Israel is similar to other Levantine cuisines and is rich in grains, meat, potato, cheese, bread, whole grains, fruits, vegetables, fresh fish and tomatoes. Perhaps the most distinctive aspect of Israeli Arab and Levantine cuisine is meze including tabbouleh, hummus and baba ghanoush, kibbeh nayyeh is also a popular mezze among Israeli Arabs. Other famous foods among Israeli Arab include falafel, sfiha, shawarma, dolma, kibbeh, kusa mahshi, shishbarak, muhammara, and mujaddara. Druze pita is a Druze-styled pita filled with labneh (thick yoghurt) and topped with olive oil and za'atar, and a popular bread in Israel.

Arabic restaurants are popular in Israel and relatively inexpensive establishments often offer a selection of meze salads followed by grilled meat with a side of "chips" (french fries, from British English) and a simple dessert such as chocolate mousse for dessert. "The Old Man and the Sea" is a popular Arab seafood restaurant in the southern part of Ajami, Jaffa. Abu Hassan is a small hummus restaurant located at the northern tip of Ajami. It was opened in 1959 by Ali Karawan and now has two additional branches in Jaffa. It has been rated as the best hummus restaurant in Israel in a number of lists. The restaurant is famous for its loyal clientele of Arabs and Jews.

Falafel HaZkenim (Hebrew: "the elders") is an Arab Israeli restaurant and falafel stand, located in Wadi Nisnas, Haifa. Since its foundation, guests are greeted with a free falafel ball dipped in tahini. Foodies consider HaZkenim's falafel among the best in Israel. It was founded in 1950 by George and Najala Afara. The falafel stand initially had no signage. Jewish customers often said that they would go to "hazkenim" (the old folks) for falafel, while Arab customers identified the place with the female co-owner. When the owners did put up a sign, it contained both names.

=== Sport ===
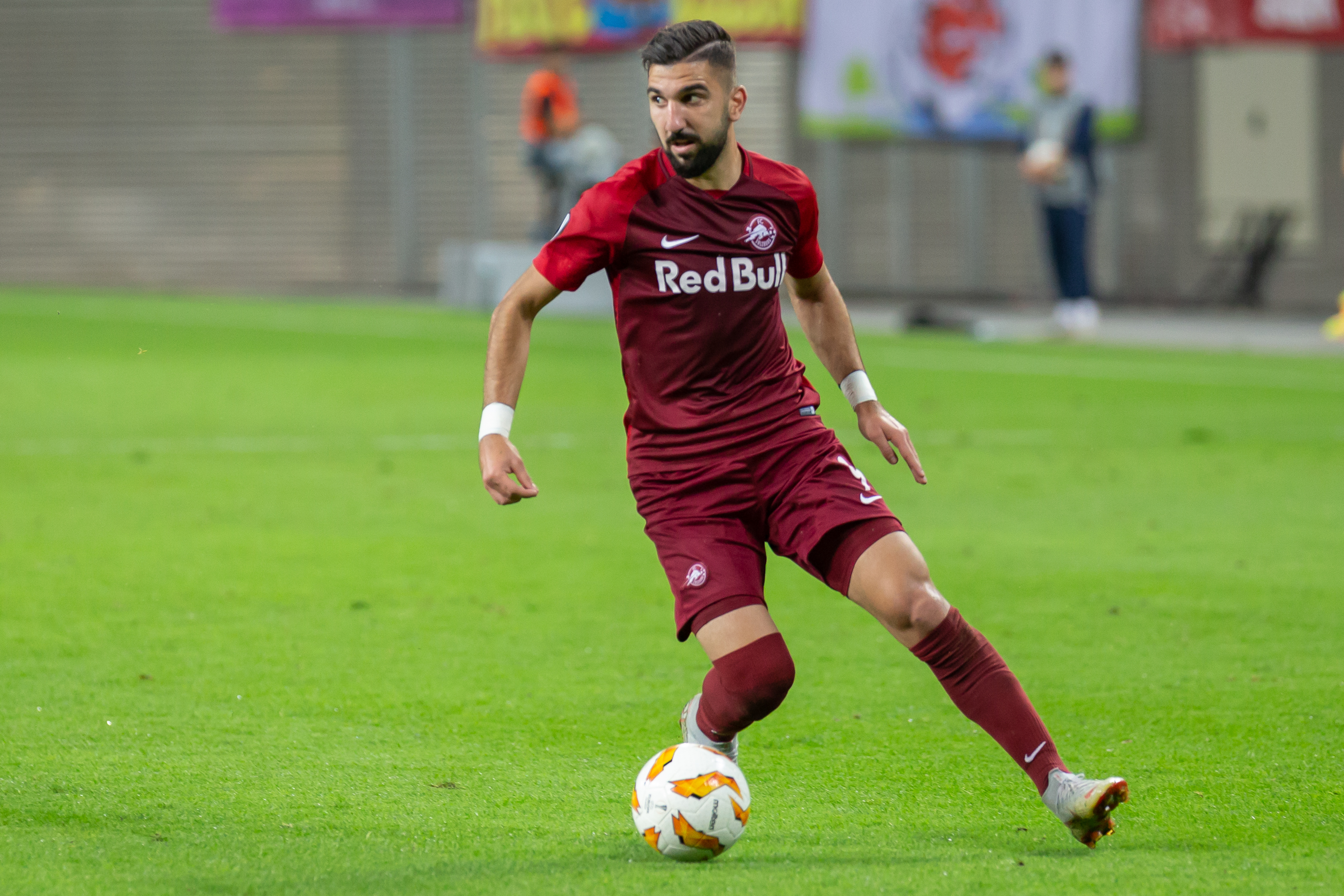
Mu'nas Dabbur, professional footballer who plays as a striker for Bundesliga club 1899 Hoffenheim and the Israel national team

Arab citizens of Israel have been prominent in the field of sport, as seen specifically by their contributions to Israeli football. Players such as Abbas Suan have had illustrious careers playing not only professional football, but also most notably for the Israel national football team. These players have been argued to represent symbols of political movement and civil justice for the Arab citizens of Israel, considering alleged discriminatory sentiments against the Arab population. Specifically in a 2005 World Cup Qualifying match, Suan and his Arab teammates played significant roles for the Israeli National Team, where Suan scored an equalising goal against the Republic of Ireland national football team. Following this match, Arab citizens of Israel received unprecedented media attention from Israeli TV stations. Even without the publicity, the Arab citizens of Israel have been said to look up to these players in hopes that they speak up for them as their political voice within Israel. In the following months, Suan and other players were criticised by the Hebrew media for their involvement with political issues. This was due to their answers to questions regarding their partaking in the singing of the Hatikvah, the national anthem of Israel.

Overall, Israel-Palestinian soccer players are looked up to greatly by the Arab citizens of Israel, yet are allegedly criticised and silenced when it comes to their attempts to involve themselves in political issues surrounding equality for Arab citizens in Israel.

=== Cinema and theater ===
Arab citizens of Israel have made significant contributions in both Hebrew and Arabic cinema and theater. Mohammad Bakri, Hiam Abbass, and Juliano Mer-Khamis have starred in Israeli film and television. Directors such as Mohammad Bakri, Elia Suleiman, Hany Abu-Assad, Michel Khleifi, and Maysaloun Hamoud have put Arab citizens of Israel on the cinematic map.

Avoda Aravit (2007), or in English, Arab Labor, is a satirical sitcom written by Kashua and aired on Israel's Channel 2. A large part of the dialogue is in Arabic with Hebrew subtitles. The show holds a mirror up to the racism and ignorance on both sides of the ethnic divide and has been compared with All in the Family. The show received overwhelmingly positive reviews, winning awards for Best Comedy, Best Lead Actor in a Comedy, Best Lead Actress in a Comedy, Best Director, and Best Screenplay at the 2013 Israeli Academy of Film and Television awards.

=== Literature ===
Acclaimed Israeli-Arab authors include Emil Habibi, Anton Shammas, and Sayed Kashua.

== See also ==
- Arab-Israeli peace projects
- Israeli apartheid
- Israeli Jews
- Israelis
- List of Arab citizens of Israel
- List of Arab members of the Knesset
- Racism in Israel
- Sumud
- Lebanese in Israel

== Bibliography ==
- Sa'di, Ahmad H., Trends in Israeli Social Science Research on the National Identity of the Palestinian Citizens of Israel, Asian Journal of Social Science 32, no. 1 (2004): 140–60
- Muhammad Amara, Language, Identity and Conflict: Examining Collective Identity through the Labels of the Palestinians in Israel, Journal of Holy Land and Palestine Studies 15.2 (2016): 203–223 Edinburgh University Press, DOI: 10.3366/hlps.2016.0141
- Aziz Haidar (1988). "Chapter 6.The Different Levels of Palestinian Ethnicity". In Milton J Esman; Itamar Rabinovich (eds.). Ethnicity, Pluralism, and the State in the Middle East. Cornell University Press. doi:10.7591/9781501745751-007. ISBN 978-0-8014-9502-1. S2CID 210556679.
