= Rujum en-Nabi Shu'ayb =

Megalithic monument in Israel

- رجم النبي شعيب (Arabic) רוג'ום נבי שועייב (Hebrew)
- Jethro’s Cairn
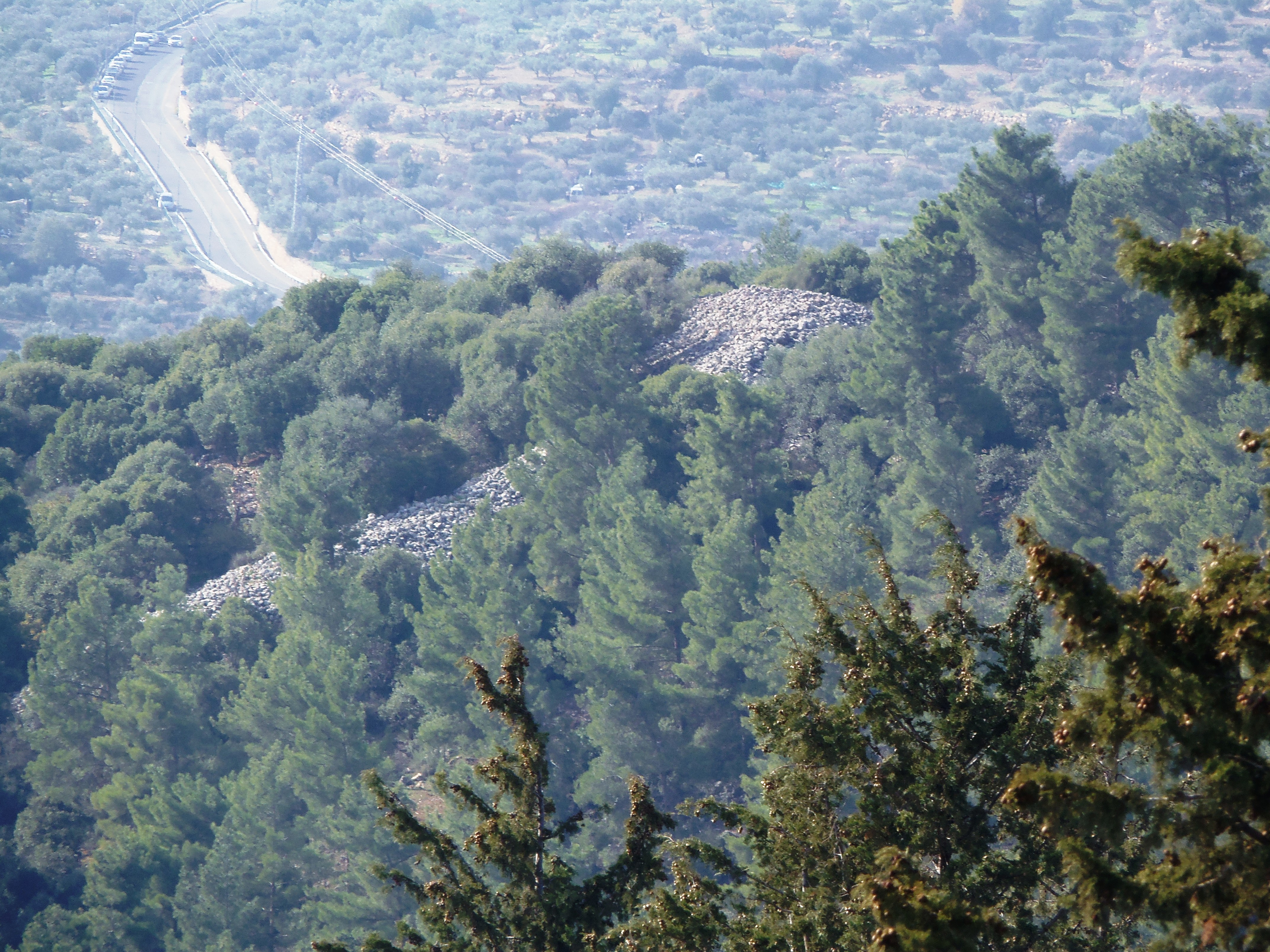
- Rujum en-Nabi Shu'ayb seen from the Tegart fort at Shefer
- Interactive map of Rujum en-Nabi Shu'ayb
- 32.939692°N 35.426468°E
- Location: Galilee, Northern District, Israel

Rujum en-Nabi Shu'ayb (Arabic: رجم النبي شعيب, Hebrew: רוג'ום נבי שועייב; "Stone heap of the prophet Shu'ayb", that is Jethro) or Jethro's Cairn is an ancient megalithic monument, consisting of a crescent shaped heap of field stones, located some 15 kilometers from the Sea of Galilee on a fairly inaccessible hillside below Parod in Northern Israel. It has been measured as 14,000 cubic meters (490,000 ft^{3}) in volume and about 150 meters (160 yards) long, making it visible from satellite photos. Bronze Age pottery excavated at the site dates the construction to between 3050 BCE and 2650 BCE, which would place it before Egypt's pyramids.

Although the site's existence was known, many archaeologists had believed the amalgamation of stones was an ancient city wall and there had been little investigation by archeologists. In 2014, Ido Wachtel, a Hebrew University PhD candidate, discovered that the structure stood alone and did not act as any sort of fortification. It is conjectured that its shape might mimic the moon; it is some 29 kilometers from Beit Yerah, an ancient pre-Talmudic town that translates as "House of the Moon." This town was known to have commercial trading operations with the ancient Egyptians and is a considered to be a one-day journey from the monument by the era's traveling standards. Similar structures have also been found in the area; one of them, Rujm el-Hiri, is located east of the Sea of Galilee in the Golan Heights. Another rock structure, first detected in 2003, was found underneath the Sea of Galilee and is larger than England's Stonehenge.

Nabi Shu’ayb was the object of traditional veneration by Druze and Sunni Muslims throughout Galilee. According to local tradition Nabi Shu’ayb wanted to build his house here after coming from the land of Midian. Having gathered a lot of stones he went to the spring at the foot of the hill and found the carcass of a pig there, so he decided to leave in the direction of Hittin, near Tiberias, where his grave is visited to this day, especially on the holiday or Ziyarat al-Nabi Shu'ayb. There are stories how, during the Ottoman period, Druze who were unable to go to the grave at Hittin for various reasons, were satisfied with standing on the rubble at Rujum en-Nabi Shu’ayb, and looking in the direction of his grave at Hittin.

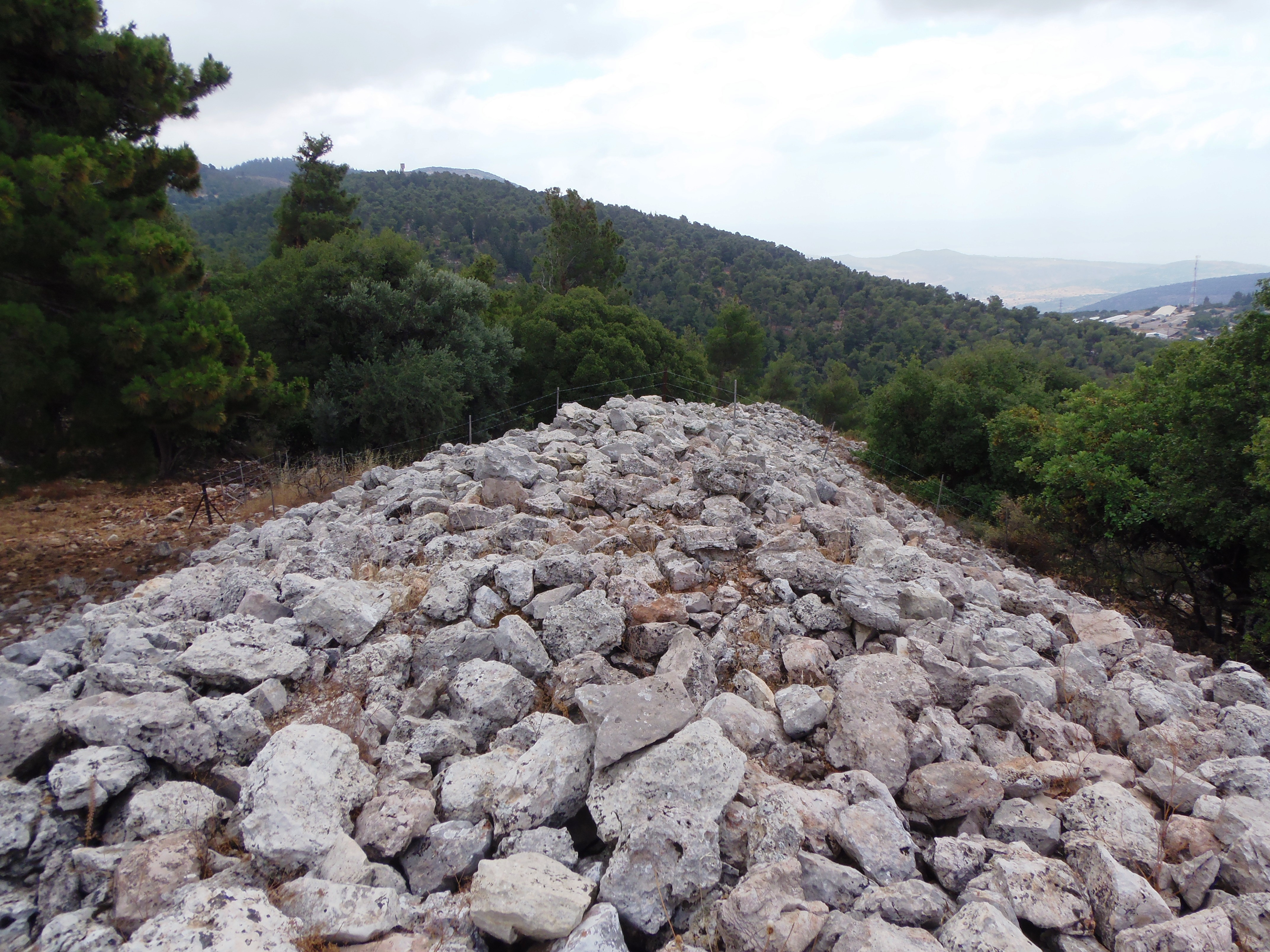
Rujum en-Nabi Shu'ayb seen from its summit

== See also ==
- Rujm el-Hiri (Gilgal Refaim)
- Nabi Shu'ayb
- Atlit Yam, which contains a semi-circle of megaliths—a possible 2nd "Stonehenge of the Levant", but submerged today—with a 6270BCE~6700BCE destruction date.
