= Salah Tarif =

Israeli Druze politician

- صالح طريف
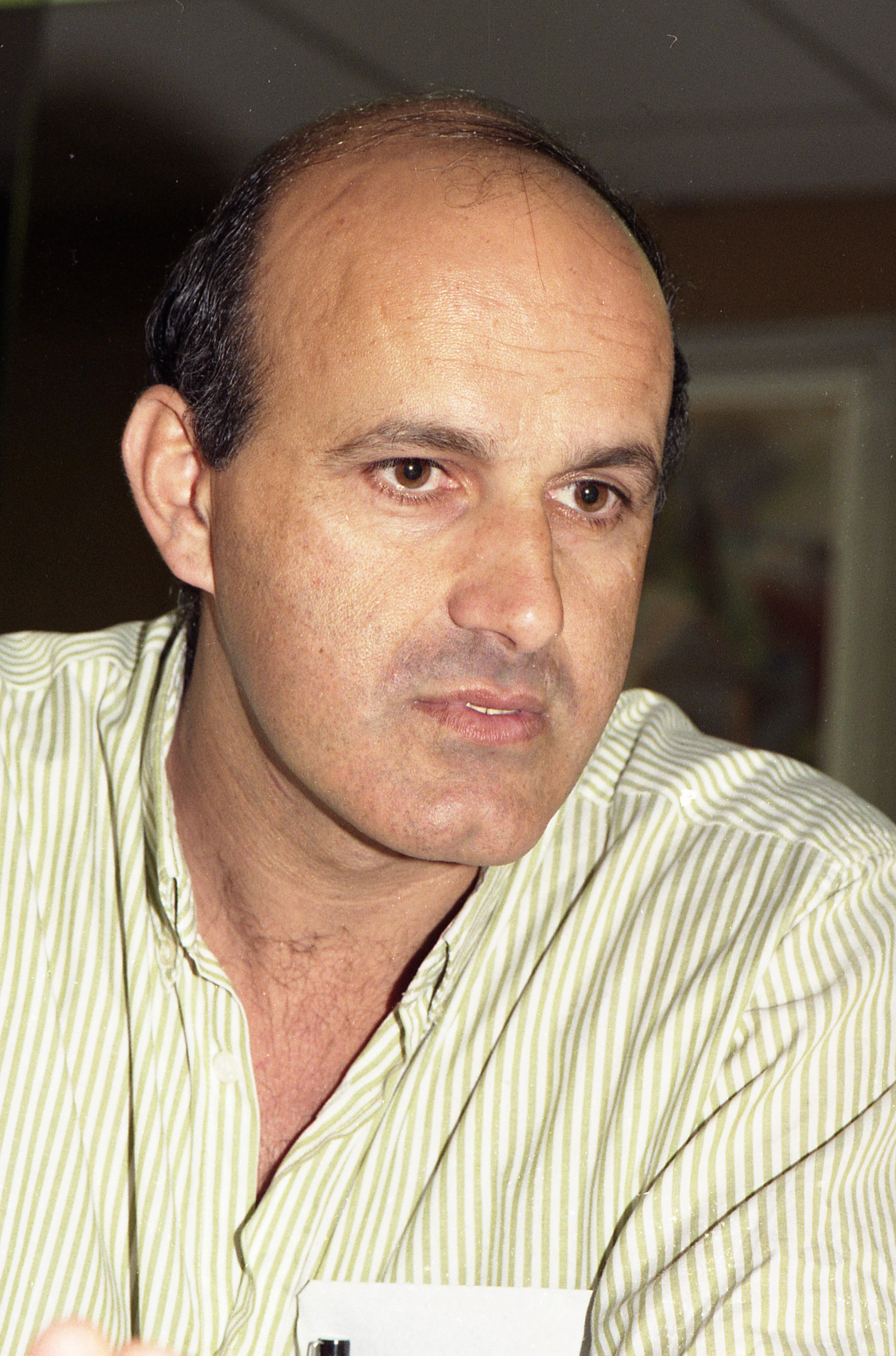

Ministerial roles
- 2001–2002: Minister without Portfolio

Faction represented in the Knesset
- 1992–1999: Labor Party
- 1999–2001: One Israel
- 2001–2003: Labor Party
- 2005–2006: Labor Party

Personal details
- Born: 9 February 1954 (age 72) Julis, Israel

Salah Tarif (Arabic: صالح طريف, romanized: Ṣāliḥ Ṭarīf, Hebrew: סאלח טריף; born 9 February 1954) is a Druze Israeli politician who served as a member of the Knesset between 1992 and 2006. When appointed Minister without Portfolio by Ariel Sharon in 2001, he became Israel's first non-Jewish government minister.

== Biography ==
Born in the Druze village of Julis, Tarif is the grandson of Sheikh Amin Tarif. Tarif served in the paratrooper and tank units of the Israel Defense Forces. While studying for his BA at the University of Haifa, he served as deputy chairman of the student union.

== Political career ==
Tarif served as mayor of Julis and chaired the board of Druze and Circassian mayors. He was a member of the Labor Party and ran on the Alignment list for the 1988 Knesset elections. Although he failed to win a seat, he entered the Knesset on 3 February 1992 as a replacement for Ezer Weizman. He retained his seat in the June 1992 elections, and in November 1995 was appointed Deputy Minister of Internal Affairs in Shimon Peres' government. He was re-elected in 1996, after which he was appointed Deputy Speaker of the Knesset.

Tarif was re-elected in 1999 (in which Labor ran under the One Israel umbrella), and in 2001 was appointed a Minister without Portfolio in Ariel Sharon's national unity government, making him the first non-Jew to hold a full ministerial position. He resigned in January 2002 in the wake of a decision to prosecute him on charges of bribery and breach of trust. He lost his seat in the 2003 elections when Labour won only 19 seats, but re-entered the Knesset in November 2005 as a replacement for Amram Mitzna who left to take over as mayor of Yeruham. In January 2006, he lost his appeal against conviction on bribery charges He failed to win a seat in the 2006 Israeli legislative election.

== See also ==
- List of Israeli Druze
- List of Israeli public officials convicted of crimes
- Mowafak Tarif, spiritual leader of the Druze in Israel and the grandson of Sheikh Amin Tarif
