= Prophet Shu'ayb Mosque =

Mosque in Mosul, Iraq

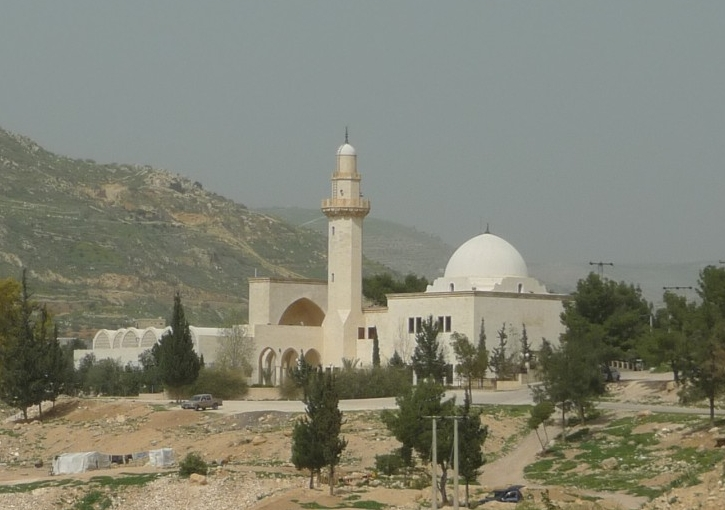
- The mosque and shrine of Shu'ayb as seen from along the Wadi Shueib river in 2012.

- Location in Jordan

Religion
- Affiliation: Sunni Islam

Location
- Location: XP68+3CG, As-Salt, Jordan
- Country: Jordan
- Interactive map of Prophet Shu'ayb Mosque
- Coordinates: 31°57′37″N 35°42′59″E

Architecture
- Type: Mosque and mausoleum
- Style: Islamic architecture
- Founder: Abdullah II (current mosque)
- Completed: c. 1950s (original structure); 2003 (current structure)

Specifications
- Dome: 1
- Minaret: 1
- Shrine: 1

The Prophet Shu'ayb Mosque is a mosque located in the city of As-Salt, the capital of the Balqa Governorate, Jordan. It contains a shrine that is believed to be the burial place of the Islamic prophet Shu'ayb, identified with the biblical patriarch Jethro. Situated near the Wadi Shueib river valley, the present day mosque is a modern reconstruction initiated by King Abdullah II of Jordan.

== History ==
The date of construction of the original shrine is unknown, although the shrine was an important site for ziyarah in 1951, as well as a rest stop for people who had travelled to the nearby Wadi Shueib. Although the attribution of the shrine to Shu'ayb is still considered unclear, most Muslims in the area consider it as being the definitive site of their prophet's tomb. During the Islamic month of Ramadan in 2003, King Abdullah II of Jordan demolished the old shrine and built a modern mosque at the site, incorporating the tomb into a room of the new mosque building.

== Architecture ==
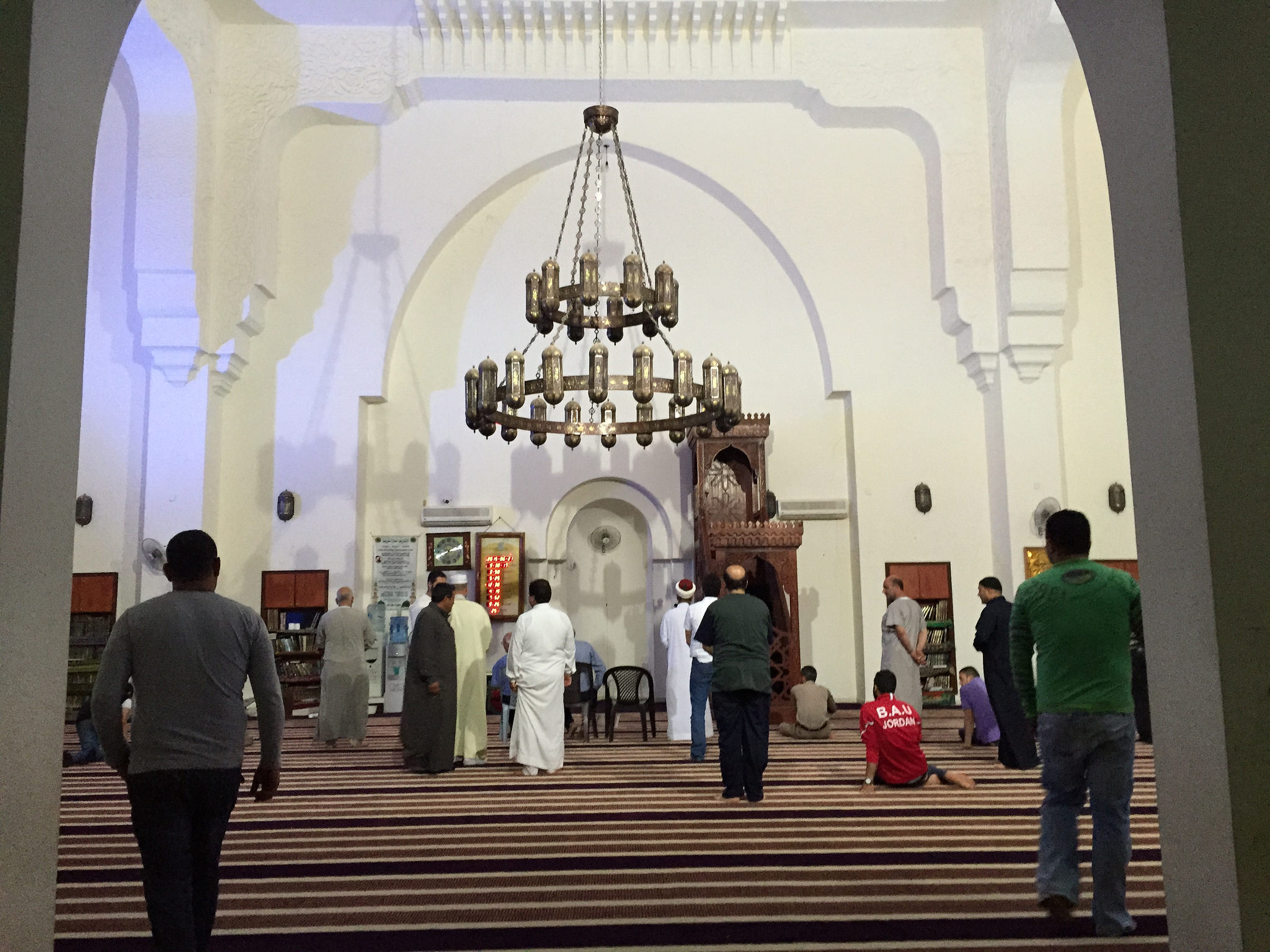
The main prayer hall of the Prophet Shu'ayb Mosque

The mosque is built in a modern, urbanist architectural style, with one minaret and a wide dome. It covers an area of 2,000 sqm² and is divided into five parts; the main prayer hall, the female prayer hall, a library, the sanitary facilities, as well as the mausoleum of Shu'ayb. The tomb of Shu'ayb is situated in the centre of the mausoleum, with a wooden cloth-wrapped sarcophagus marking the grave. The tomb is not situated behind the qibla, rather, it is next to the main prayer hall, due to the opinion of Arab scholars that a grave should not be behind the qibla, rather, it should be next to the mosque, an opinion followed by religious scholars of Jordan.

== Other sites believed to be the burial place of Shu'ayb ==
There is a large shrine to Shu'ayb located in northern Palestine, which a holy site of the Druze faith. This shrine was built during the early years of the Ayyubid era by Salah al-Din al-Ayyubi, although it is no longer a Muslim religious site. Another shrine to Shu'ayb can be found in the city of Al Diwaniyah in southern Iraq, which is a cuboid mausoleum with a double layered dome atop it. In Yemen, there used to be a shrine for Shu'ayb atop the Jabal An-Nabi Shu'ayb mountain until it was destroyed by airstrikes in 2016 during the war of Saudi Arabia against the Houthis.

== See also ==
- List of mosques in Jordan
