= List of Israeli Druze =

Lists of Israelis

By ethnicity
Israeli Jews:
Ethiopian Jews

Arab citizens of Israel:
Arab Muslims, Druze, Arab Christians

Various:
Circassians
By descent
Afghan, Algerian, American, Argentine, Armenian, Australian, Austrian

Belarusian, Belgian, Bosnian, Brazilian, British, Bulgarian

Canadian, Chilean, Chinese, Croatian, Czech

Danish, Dutch

Egyptian, Estonian, Ethiopian

Finnish, French

Georgian, German, Greek, Guatemalan

Hungarian

Indian, Iranian, Iraqi, Irish, Italian

Kazakhstani

Latvian, Libyan, Lithuanian

Mexican, Moldovan, Moroccan, Nigerian

Polish

Romanian, Russian

Serbian, Slovak, South African, Sudanese, Swedish, Swiss, Syrian

Tunisian, Turkish

Ukrainian, Uzbekistani

Yemeni
By place of residence

This is a list of notable Israeli Druze.

The list is ordered by category of human endeavor. Persons with significant contributions in two fields are listed in both of the pertinent categories, to facilitate easy lookup.

== Academics ==
- Dr. Reda Mansour – poet, historian, and diplomat, Israeli Ambassador to Ecuador, Brazil, and Panama.
- Prof. Toufik Mansour – mathematician and professor at Haifa University working in the field of combinatorics.
- Prof. Salman Zarka – physician and current Director of Ziv Medical Center in Safed; Israel Defense Forces Colonel, senior lecturer at the Haifa University and the Hebrew University of Jerusalem.
- Rami Zeedan – political scientist and historian, associate professor of Israel Studies at the University of Kansas, founding editor of the Druze Studies Journal.

== Medicine ==
- Salman Zarka – physician and current Director of Ziv Medical Center in Safed; Israel Defense Forces Colonel, senior lecturer at the Haifa University and the Hebrew University of Jerusalem.

== Politicians and government officials ==
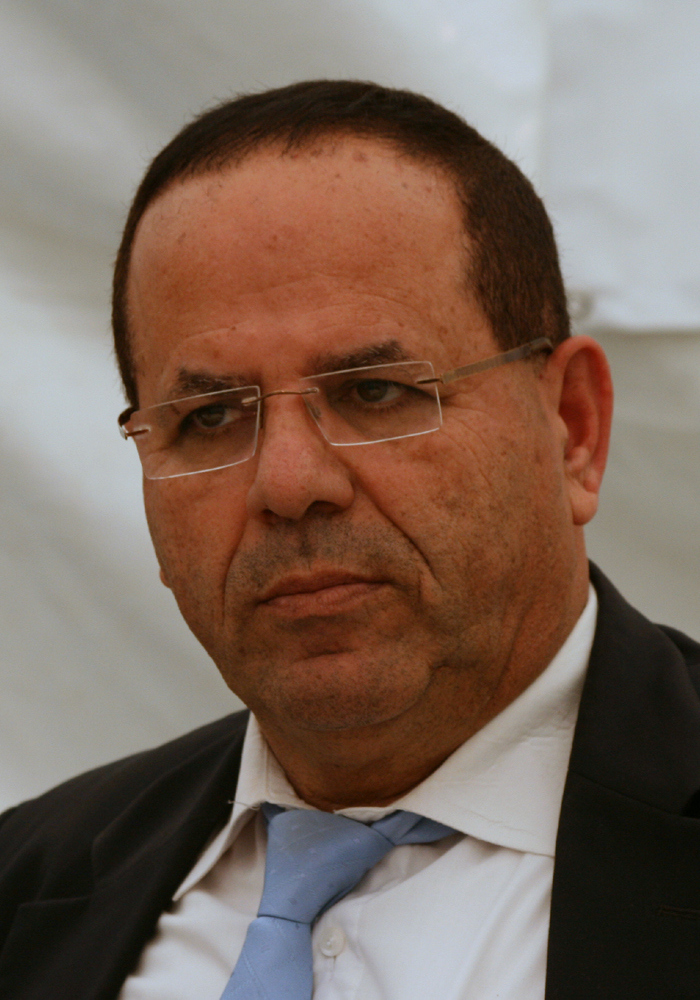
Ayoob Kara, member of the Knesset, Minister of Communications, Deputy Minister for Development

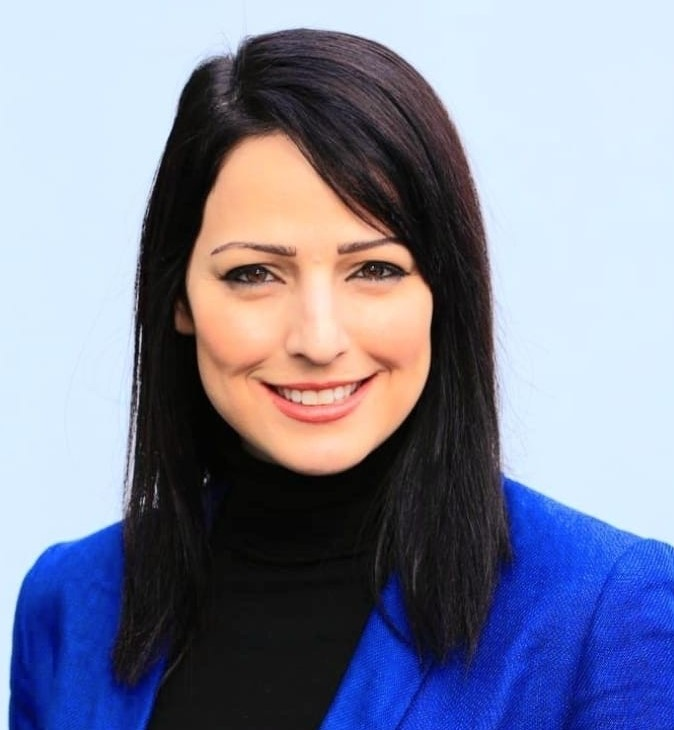
Gadeer Mreeh, journalist and member of the Knesset, anchor of a Hebrew-language news program on Israeli television.

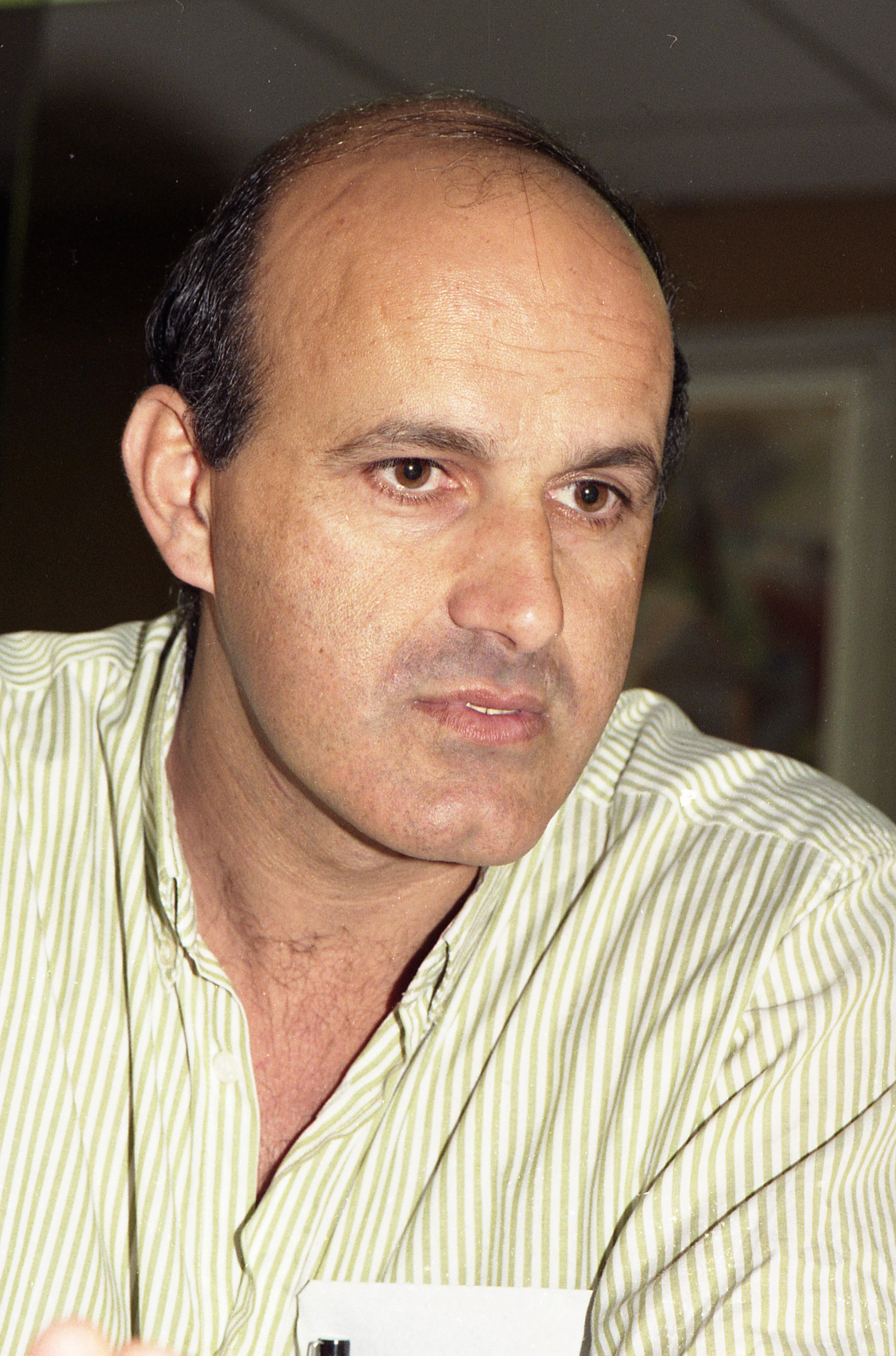
Salah Tarif, member of the Knesset, Israel's first non-Jewish government minister

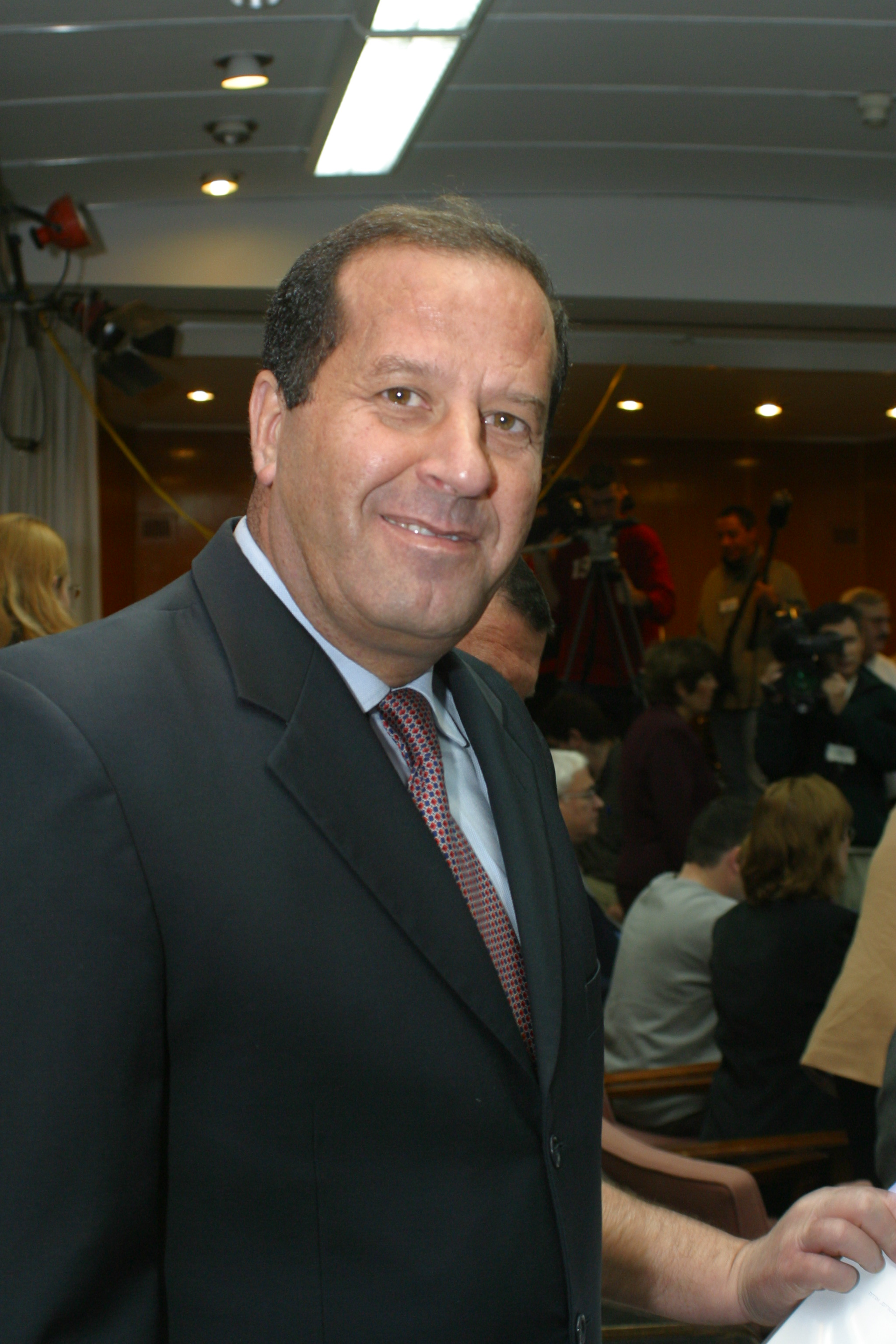
Majalli Wahabi, member of the Knesset, briefly President of Israel

- Hamad Amar – politician and currently serves as a member of the Knesset for Yisrael Beiteinu.
- Naim Araidi – academic, writer, and Israeli Ambassador to Norway
- Jabar Asakla – politician who served as a member of the Knesset for the Joint List, now secretary of the Hadash Party
- Assad Assad – former officer, diplomat, and politician who served as a member of the Knesset for Likud between 1992 and 1996.
- Shafik Assad – politician who served as a member of the Knesset for the Democratic Movement for Change, the Democratic Movement, Ahva, and Telem
- Zeidan Atashi – former diplomat and politician who served as a member of the Knesset for the Democratic Movement for Change and Shinui between 1977 and 1981, and again from 1984 until 1988.
- Amal Nasser el-Din – author and former politician who served as a member of the Knesset for Likud between 1977 and 1988; awarded the Israel Prize, the Prime Minister's Prize for the Commemoration of Fallen Soldiers, and the Yakir Haifa Award
- Salah-Hassan Hanifes – politician who served as a member of the Knesset for Progress and Work between 1951 and 1959.
- Akram Hasson – politician who served as a member of the Knesset from 2012 to 2019, first for Kadima and then for Kulanu; he was Kadima's leader, marking the first time a Druze had led a Jewish party.
- Ayoob Kara – former member of the Knesset for Likud and Israeli Minister of Communications, formerly Deputy Minister for Development of the Negev and Galilee.
- Abdullah Abu Ma'aruf – doctor and politician, served as a member of the Knesset for the Joint List between 2015 and 2017.
- Reda Mansour – poet, historian, diplomat, Israeli Ambassador to Ecuador, Brazil, and Panama
- Mufid Mari – member in the Knesset for Blue and White from 2021 to 2022.
- Amit Mekel – diplomat, Israeli Ambassador to Paraguay
- Gadeer Mreeh — journalist and politician, serving as a member of the Knesset for Blue and White since April 2019. She is the first Druze woman to serve in the Knesset, and the first Druze woman to anchor a Hebrew-language news program on Israeli television.
- Jabr Muadi – politician who served as a member of the Knesset for seven different parties between 1951 and 1981.
- Fateen Mulla – politician who served as a member of the Knesset for Likud between 2019 and 2022, and served as Deputy Minister in the Prime Minister's Office.
- Mohamed Nafa – politician who served as a member of the Knesset for Hadash from 1990 until 1992.
- Said Nafa – member of the Knesset for the Arab party Balad.
- Labib Hussein Abu Rokan – politician who served as a member of the Knesset for Cooperation and Brotherhood between 1959 and 1961.
- Saleh Saad – politician who served as a member of the Knesset for the Zionist Union and Labor Party between 2017 and 2019.
- Ali Salalha – politician who served as a member of the Knesset for Meretz from 2021 to 2022.
- Shachiv Shnaan – served as a member of the Knesset for the Labor Party between 2008 and 2009.
- Salah Tarif – member of the Knesset between 1992 and 2006. When appointed Minister without Portfolio by Ariel Sharon in 2001, he became Israel's first non-Jewish government minister.
- Majalli Wahabi – politician who served as a member of the Knesset for Likud, Kadima, and Hatnuah. He briefly assumed the position of President of Israel due to President Moshe Katzav's leave of absence and Acting President Dalia Itzik's trip abroad in February 2007, making him the first non-Jew to act as Israel's head of state.

== Military ==
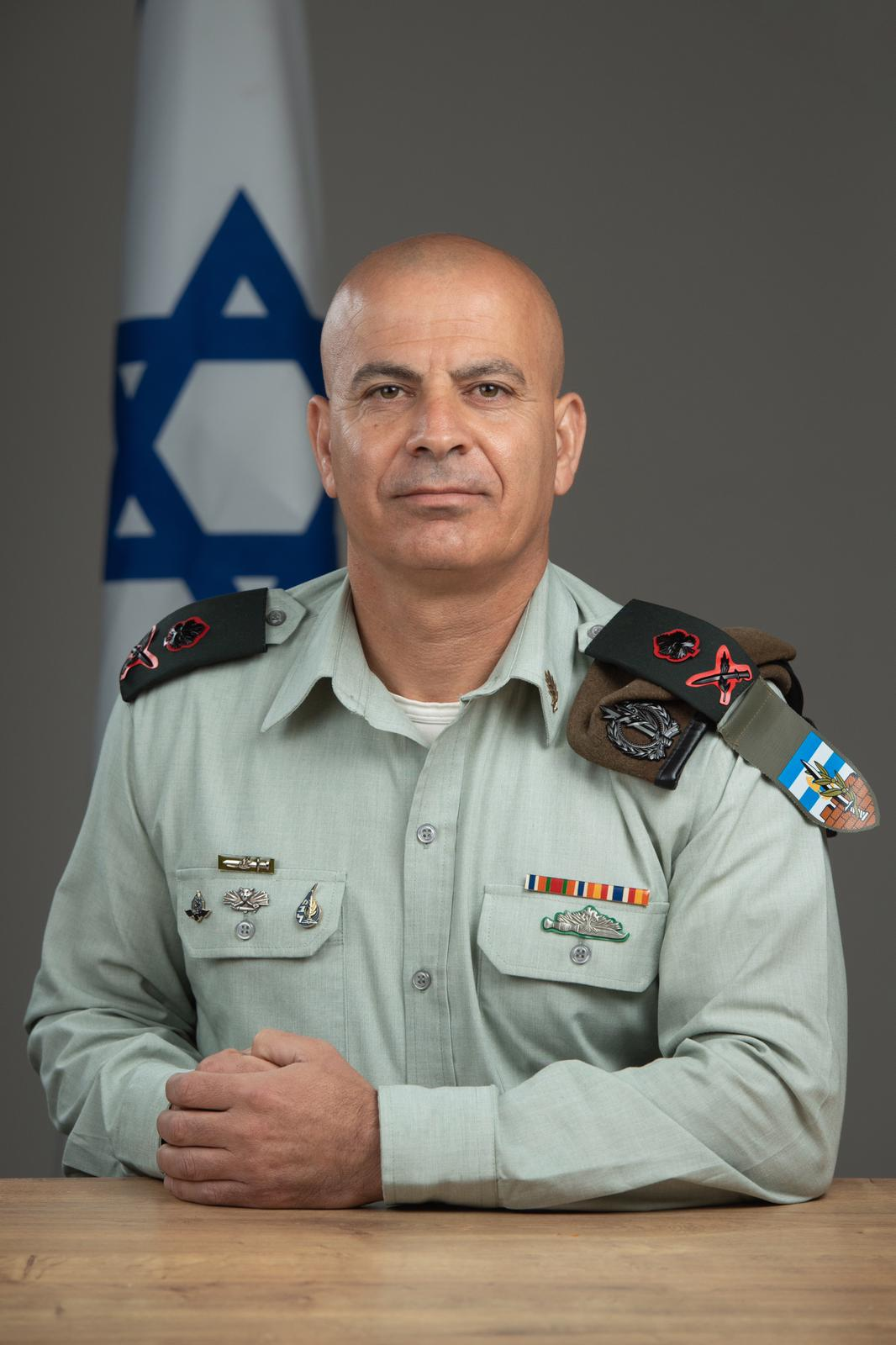
Ghassan Alian

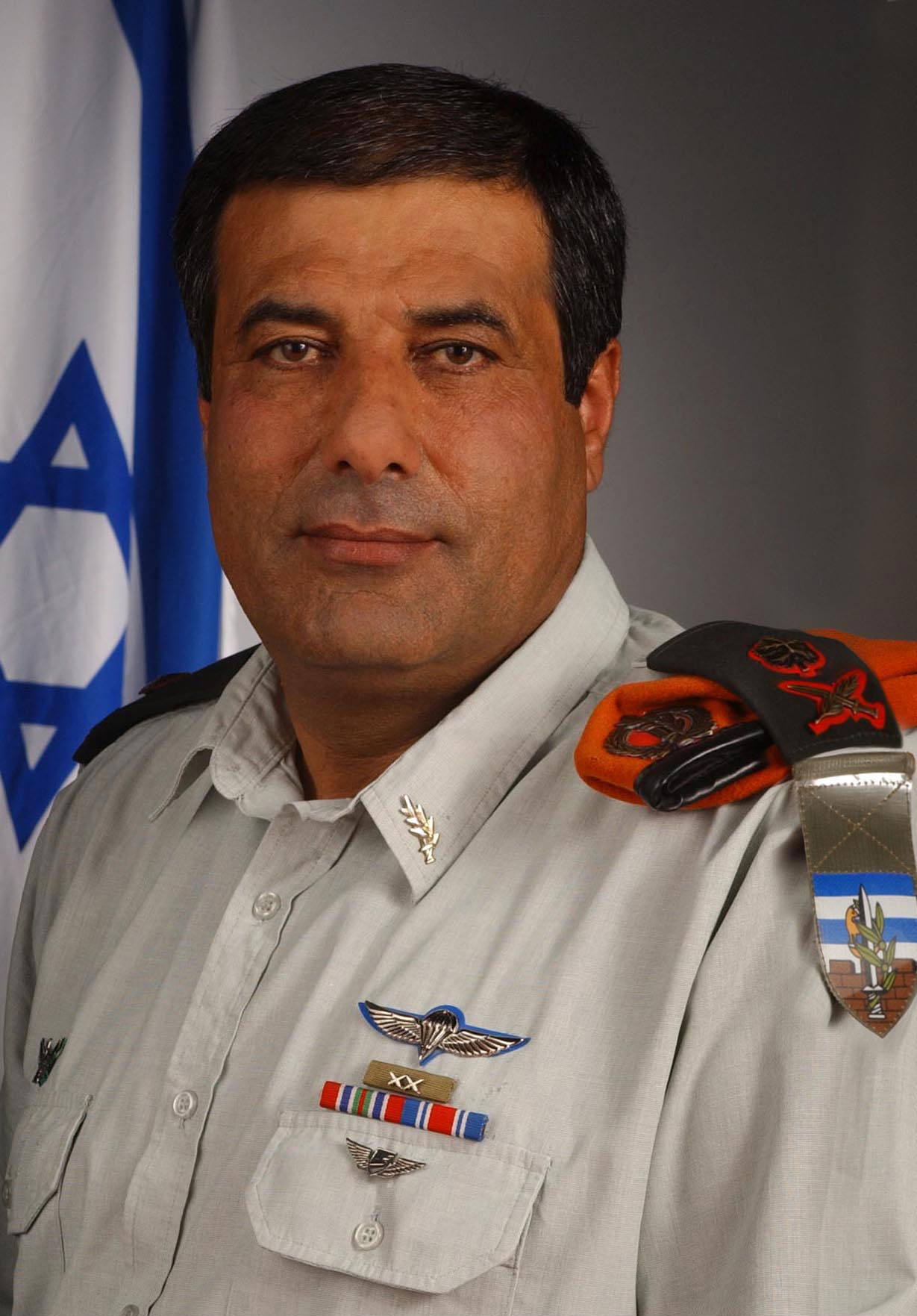
Yusef Mishleb

- Alim Abdallah – deputy commander of the Israeli 300th Brigade of the 91st Division, Lieutenant-Colonel.
- Ghassan Alian – first non-Jewish commander of the Golani Brigade.
- Munir Amar – Brigadier General in the IDF, served as commander of the Sword Battalion, he died in a plane crash while serving as the Head of the Civil Administration of the West Bank, which functions as a subdivision of the COGAT.
- Imad Fares – former Brig. General in the Israeli Defense Force. He won acclaim as the commander of the Givati Brigade (infantry) from 2001–2003.
- Salman Habaka – commander of the 188th Armored Brigade's 53rd Battalion killed in action during the Gaza war
- Majdi Halabi – disappeared on May 24, 2005, at age 19, while attempting to hitchhike from his hometown to his Ordnance Corps camp near Tirat Carmel.
- Ihab Khatib – Sergeant Major
- Yusef Mishleb – General; Served in part as commander of the Etzion Regional Brigade, commander of the Edom Division, as Coordinator of Government Activities in the Territories, and as the commander of the Home Front Command.
- Haiel Sitawe and Kamil Shnaan – border police
- Salman Zarka – physician and current Director of Ziv Medical Center in Safed; Israel Defense Forces Colonel, senior lecturer at the Haifa University and the Hebrew University of Jerusalem.

== Sports ==
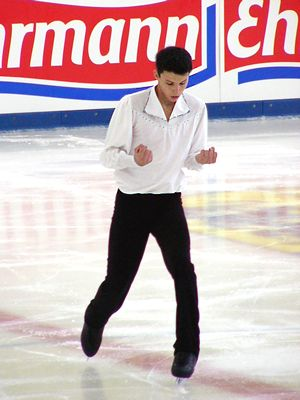
Nazar Mahmud

- Ahad Azam – footballer playing for Bnei Eilat and the Israeli national junior team
- Sari Falah – footballer playing for Bnei Sakhnin, the Israeli national junior team, and bronze medalist in the 2009 Maccabiah Games
- Shareef Keouf – footballer playing for Maccabi Haifa and the Israeli national junior team
- Mahran Lala – former footballer
- Nazar Mahmud – figure skater.
- Kenny Saief – American-Israeli footballer playing for Maccabi Haifa and the Israeli national team
- Saleh Shahin (born 1982) – Team Israel Paralympic medalist rower

== Writers ==
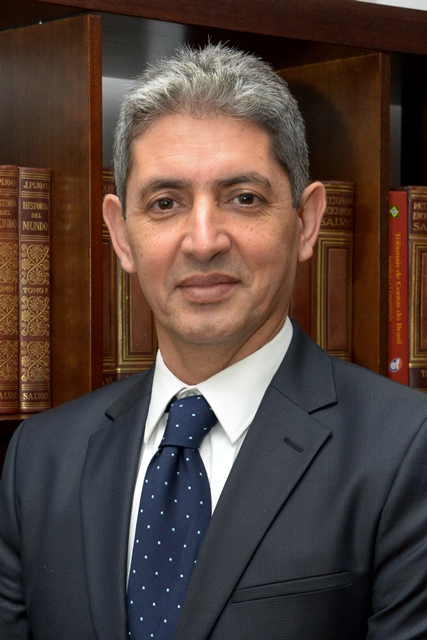
Reda Mansour

- Naim Araidi – academic, writer, and Israeli Ambassador to Norway
- Suliman Bashear – scholar, writer, and professor of the early historiography of Islam.
- Reda Mansour – poet, historian, and diplomat, Israeli Ambassador to Ecuador, Brazil, and Panama.
- Salman Masalha – poet, writer, essayist, and translator.
- Samih al-Qasim – poet
- Salman Natour – writer, journalist, and playwright.
- Rami Zeedan – author, political scientist, and historian.

== Miscellaneous ==
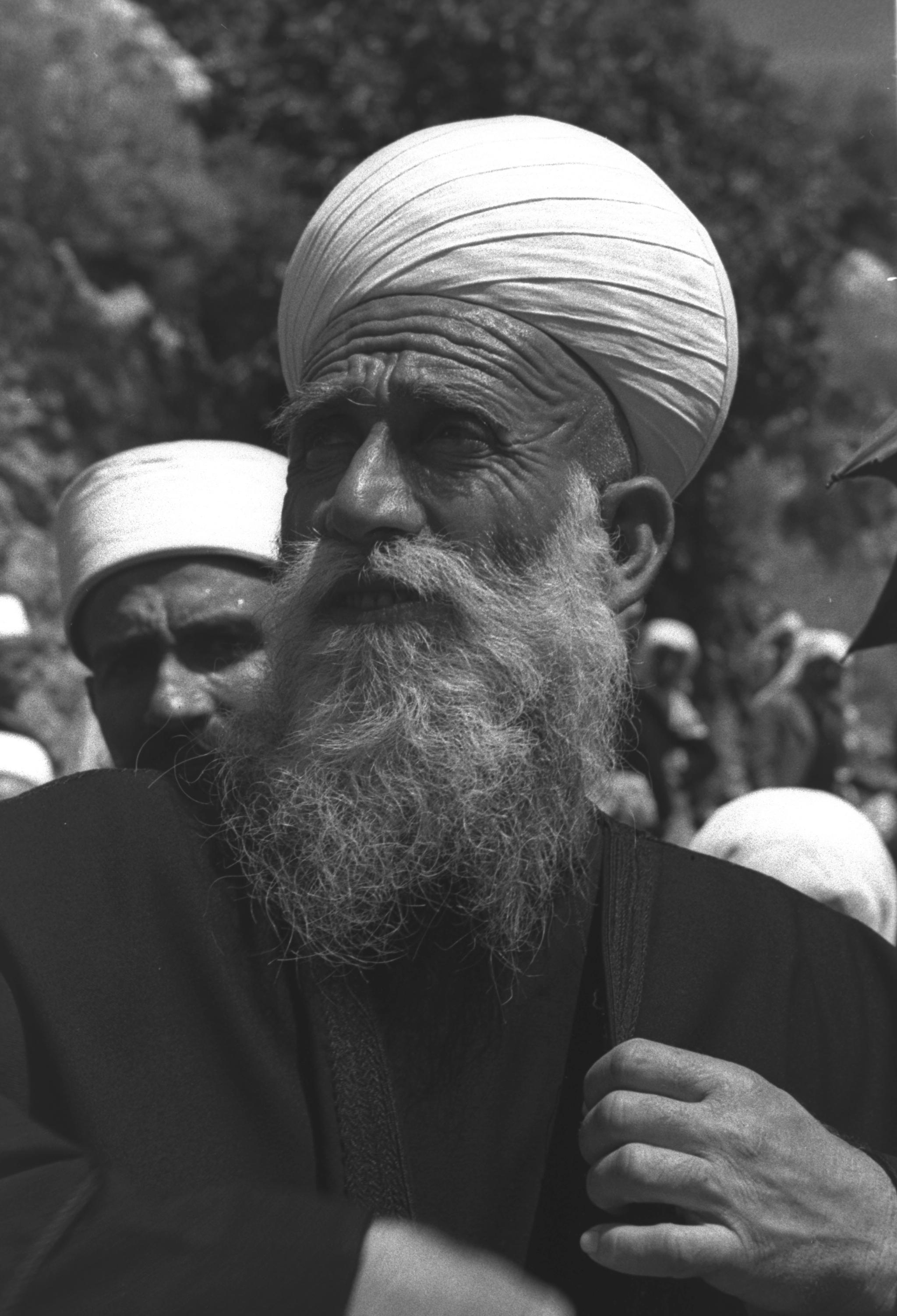
Sheikh Amin Tarif, 1950.

- Azzam Azzam – convicted in Egypt in 1997 of spying for Israel, and jailed for eight years. He maintained his innocence throughout the ordeal.
- Tiran Fero – teenager removed from life support and held hostage by members of the Jenin Brigades armed group
- Fatma Shanan – painter
- Amin Tarif – Sheikh, the spiritual leader of the Druze in Israel from 1928 till his death in 1993.
- Mowafaq Tarif – grandson of Amin Tarif and spiritual leader of the Druze in Israel since 1993.
- Mike Sharif – singer
- Loai Ali – singer and actor

== See also ==
- Israelis
- List of notable Israelis
- List of Druze
- Druze in Israel
