= Fatma Shanan =

Israeli Druze painter

Fatma Shanan فاطمة شنان
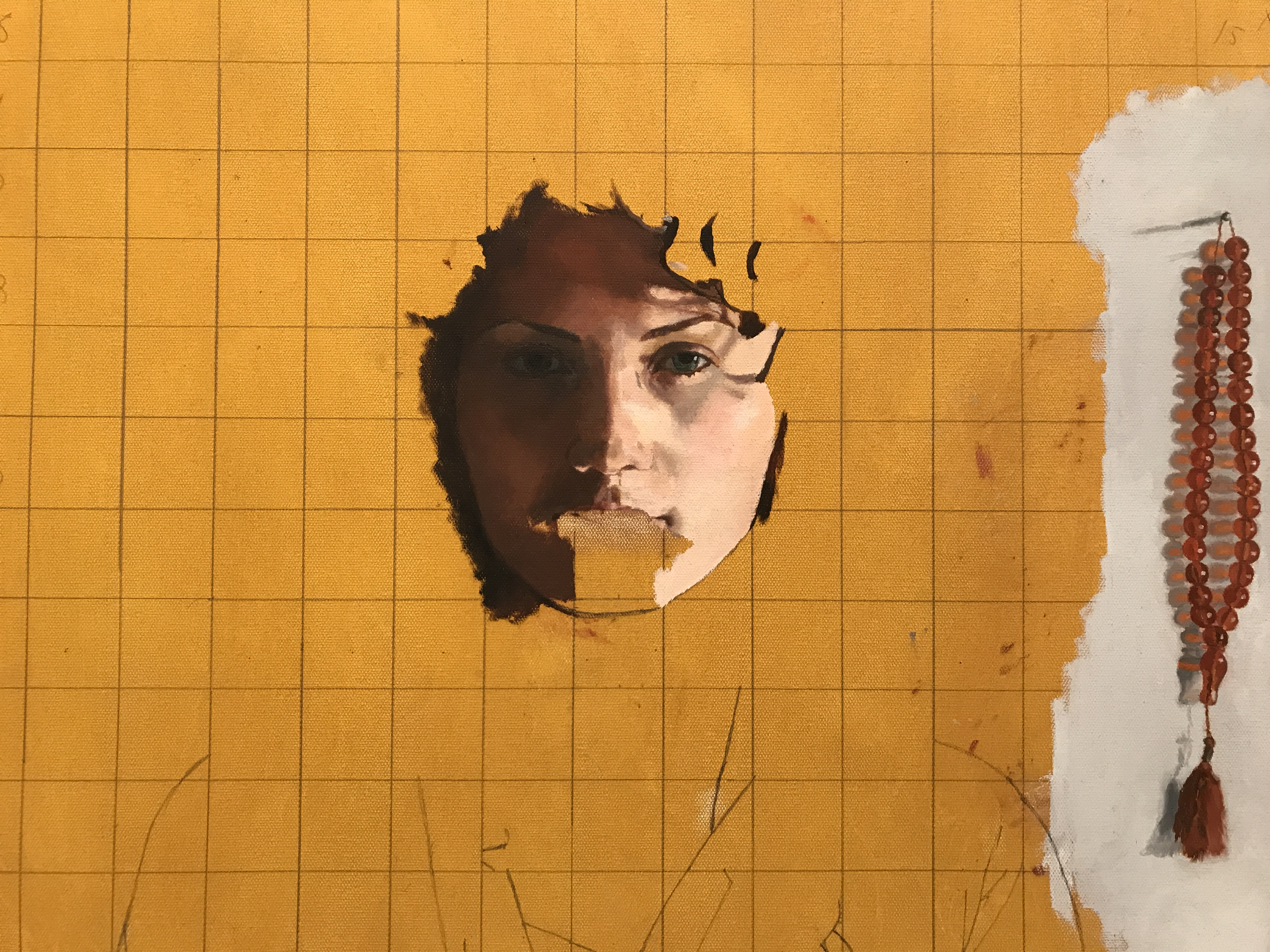
- Fatma Shanan selfportrait
- Born: 1986 (age 39–40); Julis, Israel
- Known for: Painting
- Movement: Figurative, Realism
- Website: http://www.fatmashanan.com

Fatma Shanan (Arabic: فاطمة شنان) is a Druze painter from Israel.

== Biography ==
Fatma Shanan was born in 1986 and grew up in Julis, Israel. As a kid, she attended private art lessons due to the lack of art courses in her elementary school curriculum. She studied visual arts at the Oranim Academic College from 2007 to 2010. Afterwards, she studied in the studio of traditionalist Israeli artist Elie Shamir for a year. She lives and works between Tel Aviv and Julis.

Shanan is known for her figurative oil paintings of scenes of Druze villages and is inspired by 19th and 20th-century realism. Almost all of her paintings are derived from staged photographs, which utilize family and friends as models. Many of her pieces feature traditional Eastern carpets, which contrast with her Western landscapes. The image of the oriental carpet is prominent in the Druze culture and common in most households. The carpet serves as an object of prayer, which must stay clean and not be stepped on. The carpet maintenance is often a job attended to by a woman. Her work primarily deals with identity by representing figures in domestic and public spheres. She especially focuses on her identity as a woman within her community and how that has impacted her life, aspiring to develop more fluidity between genders and other demographics.

She has also produced several self-portraits, which similarly contain carpet patterns or other objects showing identity. One piece, titled "Floating Self Portrait" depicts Shanan levitating over a carpet, which was developed from a video she took in the Metropolitan Museum of Art.

== Exhibitions ==
Fatma Shanan held solo and group exhibitions in galleries and museums around the world, including solo exhibitions in Tel Aviv Museum of Art, Zemack Contemporary Art, and Umm al-Fahm Art Gallery. She has participated in many group exhibitions including ones at the Museum of Islamic Art in Jerusalem, Janco Dada Museum, Bloomfield Science Museum, The Mediterranean Biennale in Sakhnin, Fresh Paint art fair and Alfred Institute for Contemporary Art.

== Collections ==
Fatma Shanan's works are part of collection of Israel Museum in Jerusalem.

== Awards ==
- 2010 Prize for the Encouragement of Further Artistic Creation, The Art Institute, Oranim Academic College, Kiryat Tivon
- 2010 Excellency Award, The America-Israel Cultural Foundation
- 2013 Homebase Project artist's grant
- 2014 Grant for catalogue publication, Israel National Lottery
- 2014 Artist in the Community Prize, Ministry of Culture and Sport
- 2016 The Yehoshua Rabinovich Foundation for the Arts’ Grant, Tel Aviv
- 2016 Haim Shiff Prize for Figurative-Realist Art, Tel Aviv Museum of Art
- 2017 The Ministry of Culture award for the young artist

== See also ==
- List of Israeli Druze
