= Shuaib =

One of the prophets in Islam

Prophet Shuaib Alayhi as-Salam
- شُعَيْب; Jethro
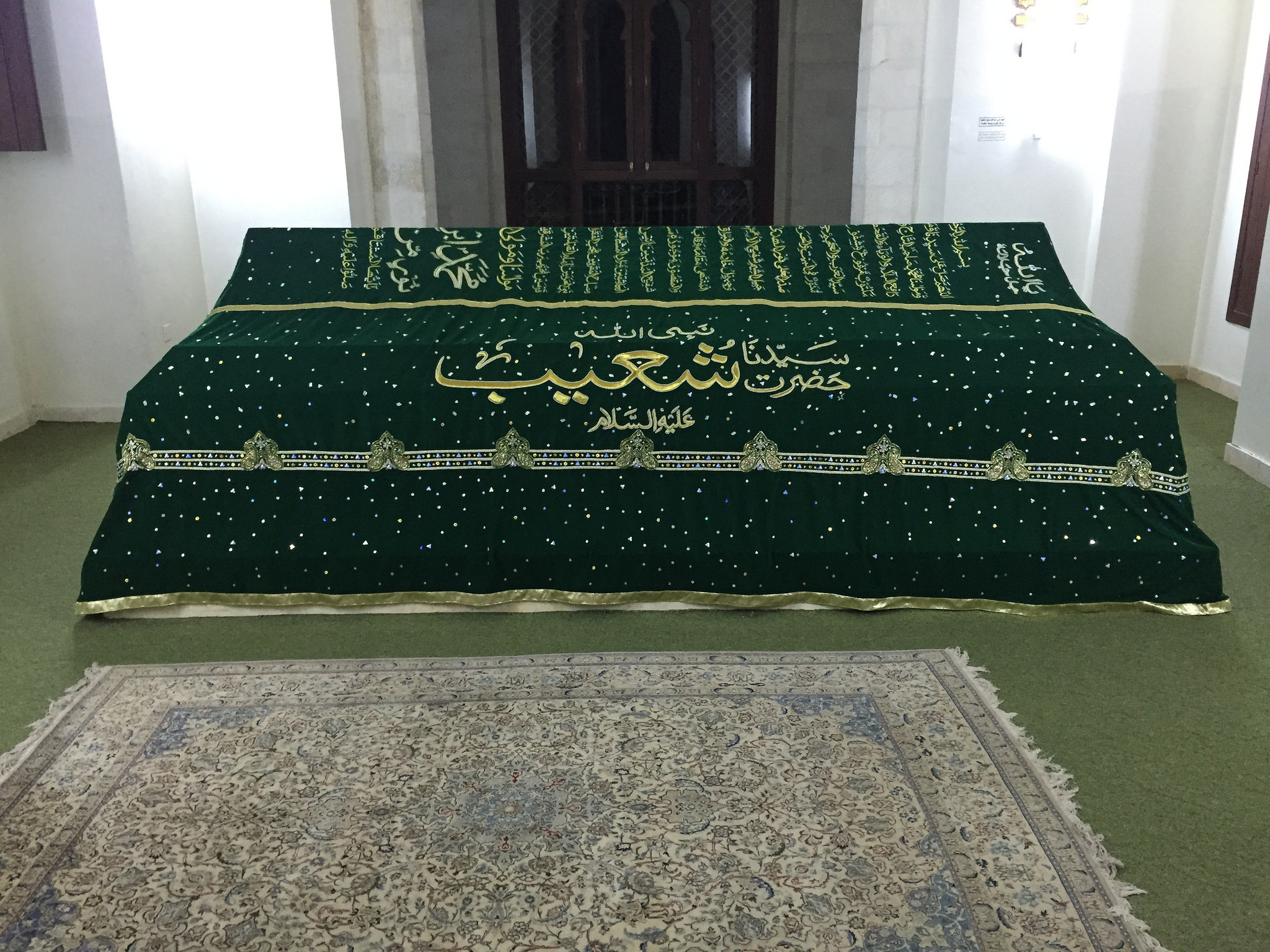
- The cenotaph of Shuaib at Maqam Nabi Shu'ayb in Jordan

Prophet of Islam
- Preceded by: Ayyub
- Succeeded by: Musa

Personal life
- Relatives: Issachar (grandfather)

Religious life
- Religion: Islam

Shuaib, Shoaib, Shuayb or Shuʿayb (Arabic: شُعَيْب, IPA: [ʃuʕajb]; meaning: "who shows the right path") is an ancient Midianite prophet in Islam and the most revered prophet in the Druze faith. Shuaib is sometimes identified with the Hebrew biblical Jethro, Moses's father-in-law. Shuaib is mentioned in the Quran 11 times. He is believed to have lived after Ibrahim (Abraham), and Muslims believe that he was sent as a prophet to the Midianites, who are also known as the Aṣḥāb al-Aykah ("Companions of the Wood") for their worship of a large tree. To the Midianites, Shuaib proclaimed the "straight path", warning them to end their fraudulent ways. When the community did not repent, God destroyed the community.

Alongside Hud, Salih, and Muhammad, Shuaib is understood by Muslims as one of the four Arabian prophets sent by God. Ibn Kathir stated that he was known by Muslims as "the eloquent preacher amongst the prophets" because he was, according to tradition, granted talent and eloquence in his language.

The Druze honor Shuaib as their principal prophet and hold an annual pilgrimage to Nabi Shu’ayb—a site in the Lower Galilee believed by Druze to be his tomb—from April 25 to 28, known as Ziyara.

== Historical context ==
The area to which Shuʿayb was sent to is named Madyan in the Qur'an, known in English as Midian, which is frequently referred to in the Hebrew Bible. The Midianites were said to be of Arab descent, though being neighbors of the Biblical Canaanites, they intermixed with them. It is said they were a wandering tribe, and that their principal territory at the time of Moses was the Sinai Peninsula. The historical region of Midian roughly corresponds to what is now province of Tabuk in Saudi Arabia.

According to the Book of Genesis, the Midianites were the descendants of Midian, a son of Abraham and his wife Keturah: "Abraham took a wife, and her name was Keturah. And she bare him Zimran, and Jokshan, and Medan, and Midian, and Ishbak, and Shuah" (Genesis 25:1–2, King James Version).

Midian can be considered as being part of the Hejaz, which is significant for Muslims as the region of their two holiest cities, Mecca and Medina.

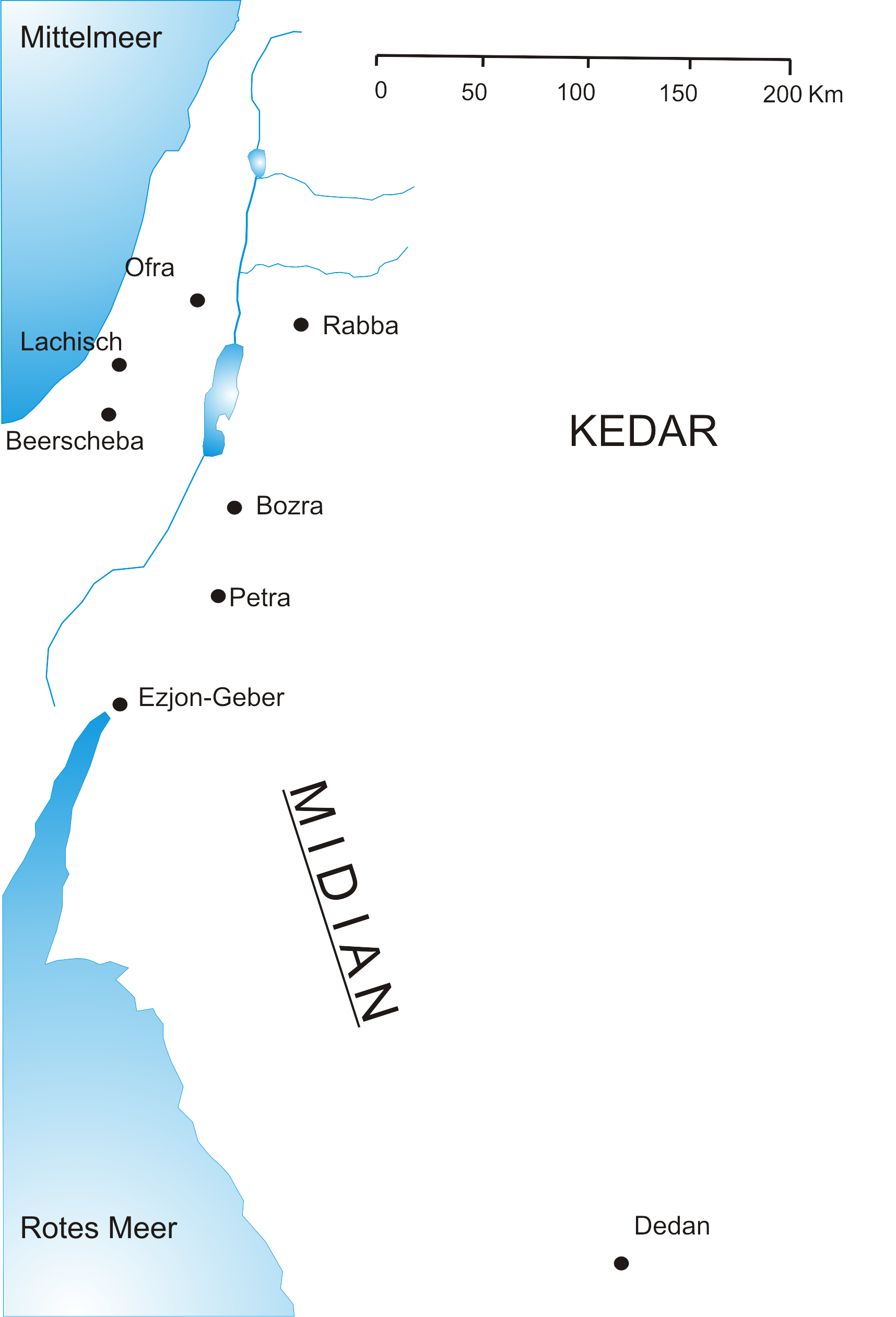
A map of Midian, the area where Shuʿayb was sent to prophesy, in Islamic belief

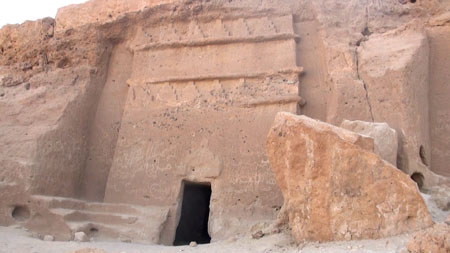
Maghayir Shu'ayb in what is now Tabuk Province in Saudi Arabia

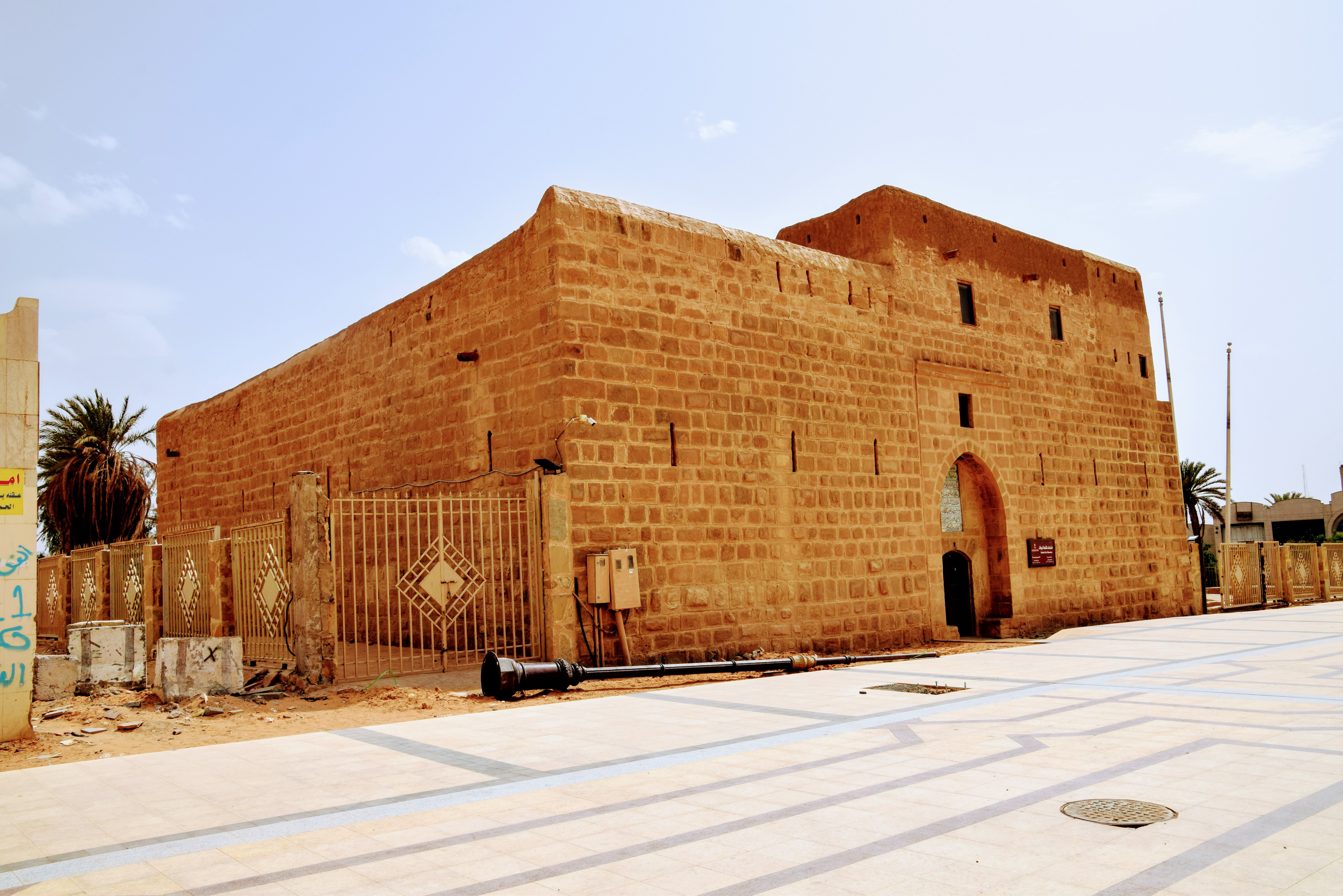
The historical castle of Tabuk

=== Discussion on identification with Jethro ===
Jethro is mentioned in the Hebrew Bible (Exodus 3:1) as the father-in-law of Moses. The entry for "Shu'ayb" in the Encyclopaedia of Islam notes that while the Quranic narrative focus is different from the Biblical one, Muslim tradition (starting with early commentators) almost universally identifies the two because both are linked to the land of Midian and Moses. Some scholars reject this identification. The classical commentator Ibn Kathir says Shuʿayb was a great-grandson of Abraham: Shuʿayb is believed to have been the son of Mikil, son of Midian, son of Abraham. That would render impossible the identification with Jethro, who purportedly lived hundreds of years after Abraham.

== Narrative in the Quran ==
The Qur'an states that Shuaib was appointed by God to be a prophet to the people of Midian. The people of this land were said to be especially notorious for cheating others through dishonesty and for idolatry. Shuʿayb's prophecy mainly involved calling the Midianites to the correct path of God, and forbidding them to worship false gods.

It is also said he told his people to stop being dishonest in their daily activities. Although he preached and prophesied for a sustained period of time, the majority of the people refused to listen to him. Shuayb, however, remained steadfast. He consistently preached powerfully against the wicked, telling them of the punishment that had befallen the sinful before them. Shuʿayb warned the people that their ignorance would lead to the destruction of Midian, giving historical examples of earlier prophets, including Noah, Hud, Saleh and Lot, all of whose people had been destroyed by God.

The people taunted Shuʿayb and told him that, were it not for the prestigious family he came from, he would surely have been stoned to death. Shuayb replied, "Is my family of more consideration with you than God?" When the Midianites refused to believe, they were destroyed by a mighty earthquake. The Qur'an, however, mentions that Shuʿayb, and his believing companions, were rescued from the thunderous punishment.

== Parallels with other prophets ==
Shuayb's mission is often mentioned in the Qur'an with the mission of Noah, Hud, Saleh and Lot. Scholars have pointed out that these five prophets exemplify the early prophetic missions: The prophet would be sent to his community; the community would pay no attention to his warning and would instead threaten him with punishment; after years of preaching, God would ask him to leave his community, while his people were subsequently destroyed in a punishment. Scholars chronologically interpret the listing of the five prophets, so Shuʿayb was a descendant of Ibrahim (Abraham) and Nuh (Noah).

== Claimed burial places of Shuayb ==
=== Wādī Shuʿayb, Jordan ===
One claimed tomb of Shuayb is found in Jordan, 2 km (1.2 mi) west of the town of Mahis, in an area called Wādī Shuʿayb (Arabic: وَادِي شُعَيْب).

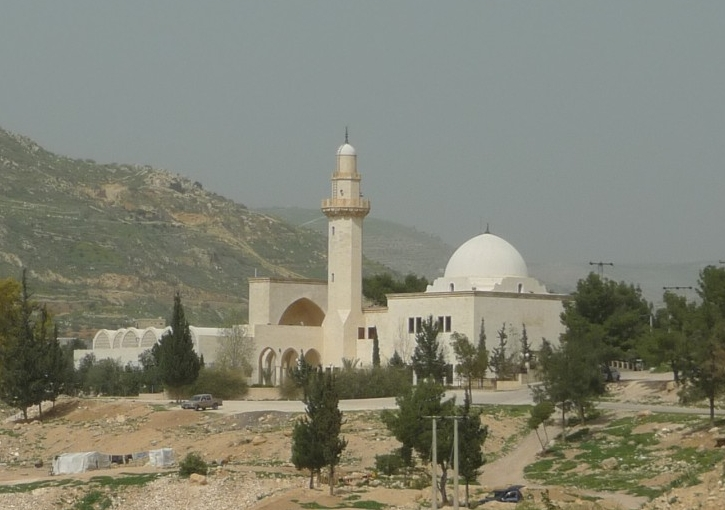
One of the claimed shrines of Shuayb, which is the Prophet Shu'ayb Mosque in Wadi Shuʿayb, Jordan, the Levant

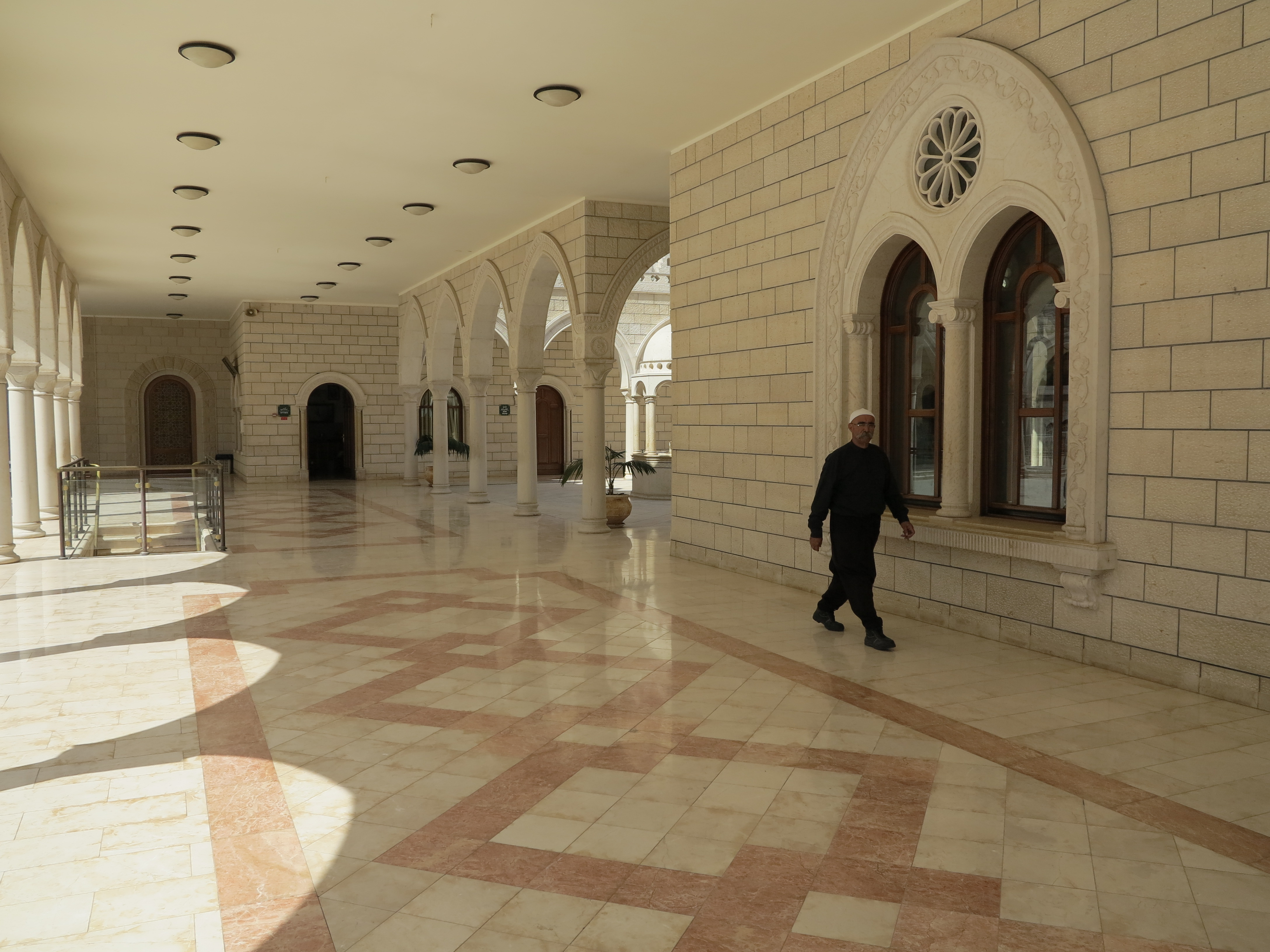
The shrine of Shuayb, as believed by the Druze and some Muslims, near Hittin in the Galilee

=== Galilee, Israel ===
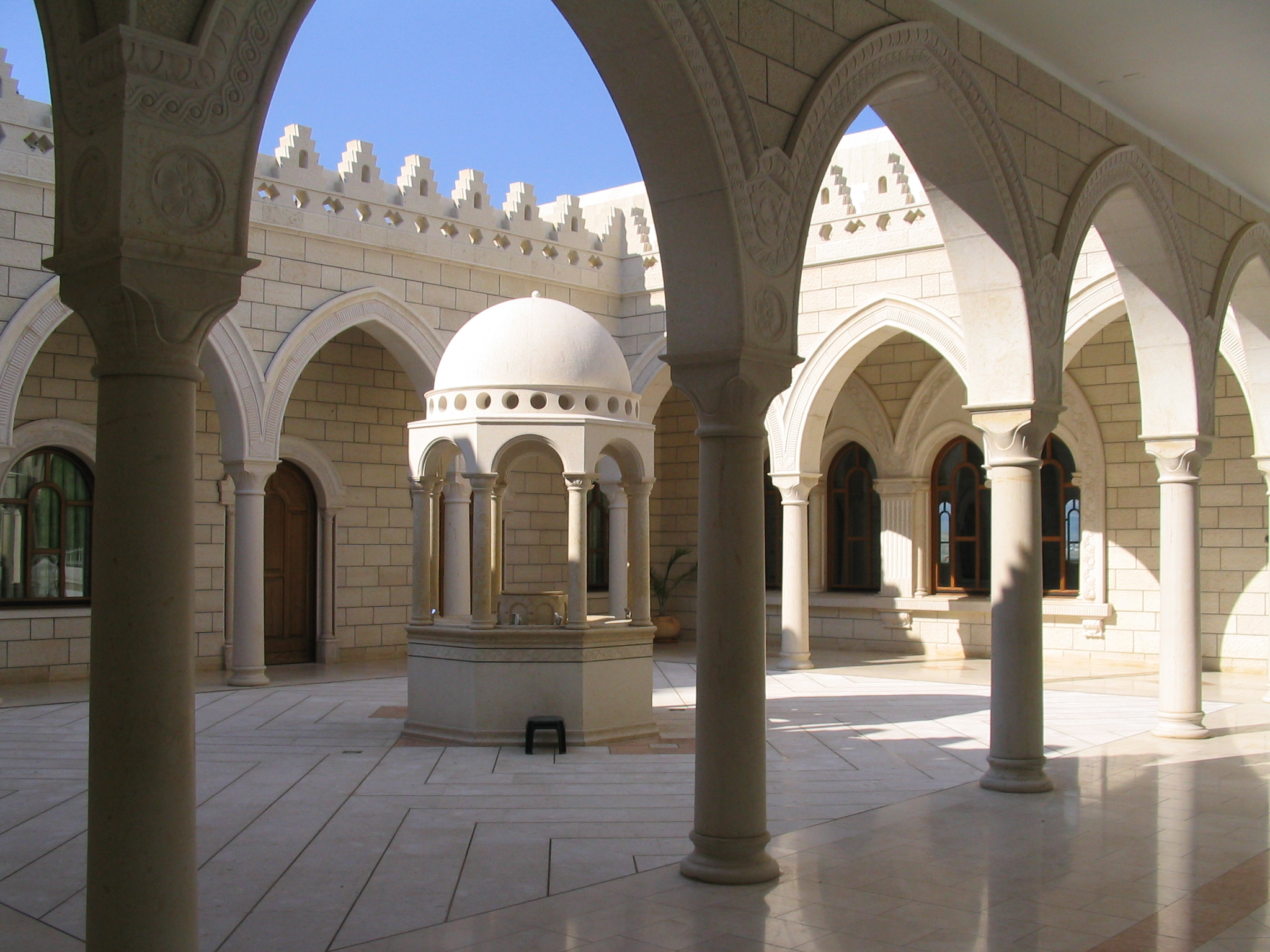
Nabi Shu'ayb in Israel, the holiest place in Druzism.

The Galilean Shrine of Shu'ayb: the Druze believe the tomb of Nabi Shu'ayb is located near Hittin, in the Lower Galilee. Each year, on the 25th of April, the Druze gather at the site to discuss community affairs.

=== Guriyeh, Iran ===
There is also a tomb in the southwest of Iran, in the village Guriyeh, Shushtar, which has been recorded as the tomb of Shuayb.

== See also ==
- Biblical and Quranic narratives
- Jabal An-Nabi Shu'ayb
- Legends and the Qur'an
- Qiṣaṣ al-Anbiyāʾ ("Stories of the Prophets")
