= Yusef Mishleb =

Israeli Druze general

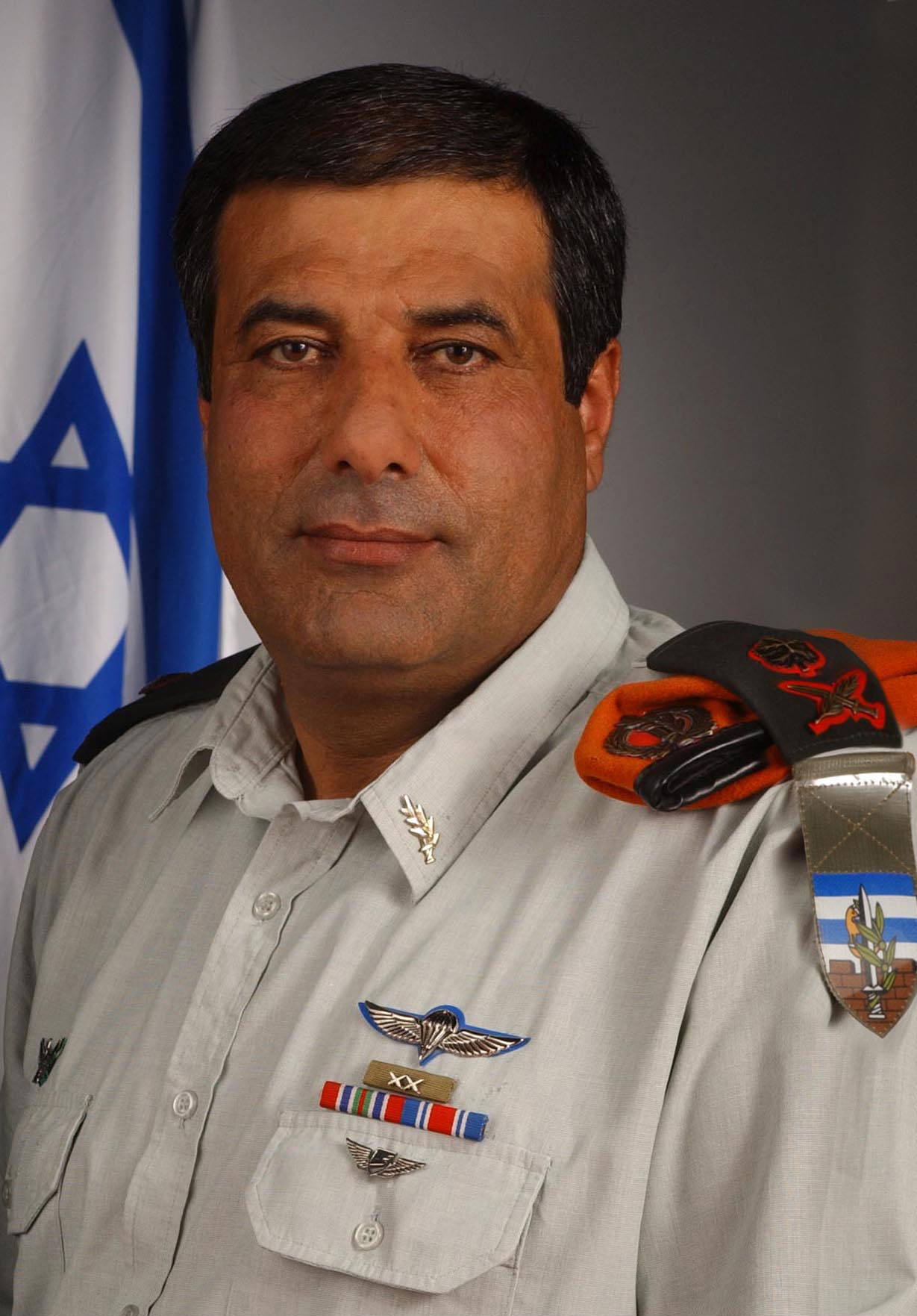
Yusef Mishleb

Aluf (Major General) Yusef Mishleb (sometimes spelled Yosef Mishlev) (Arabic: يوسف مشلب, Hebrew: יוסף מישלב; born 1952) is a retired Druze general in the Israel Defense Forces serving last in the position as the Coordinator of Government Activities in the Territories. Mishleb retired in September 2008 after four years in the job and over 35 years in the Israel Defense Forces.

== See also ==
- List of Israeli Druze
