= Amin Tarif =

Druze Spiritual Leader

- Arabic: أمين طريف; Hebrew: אמין טריף
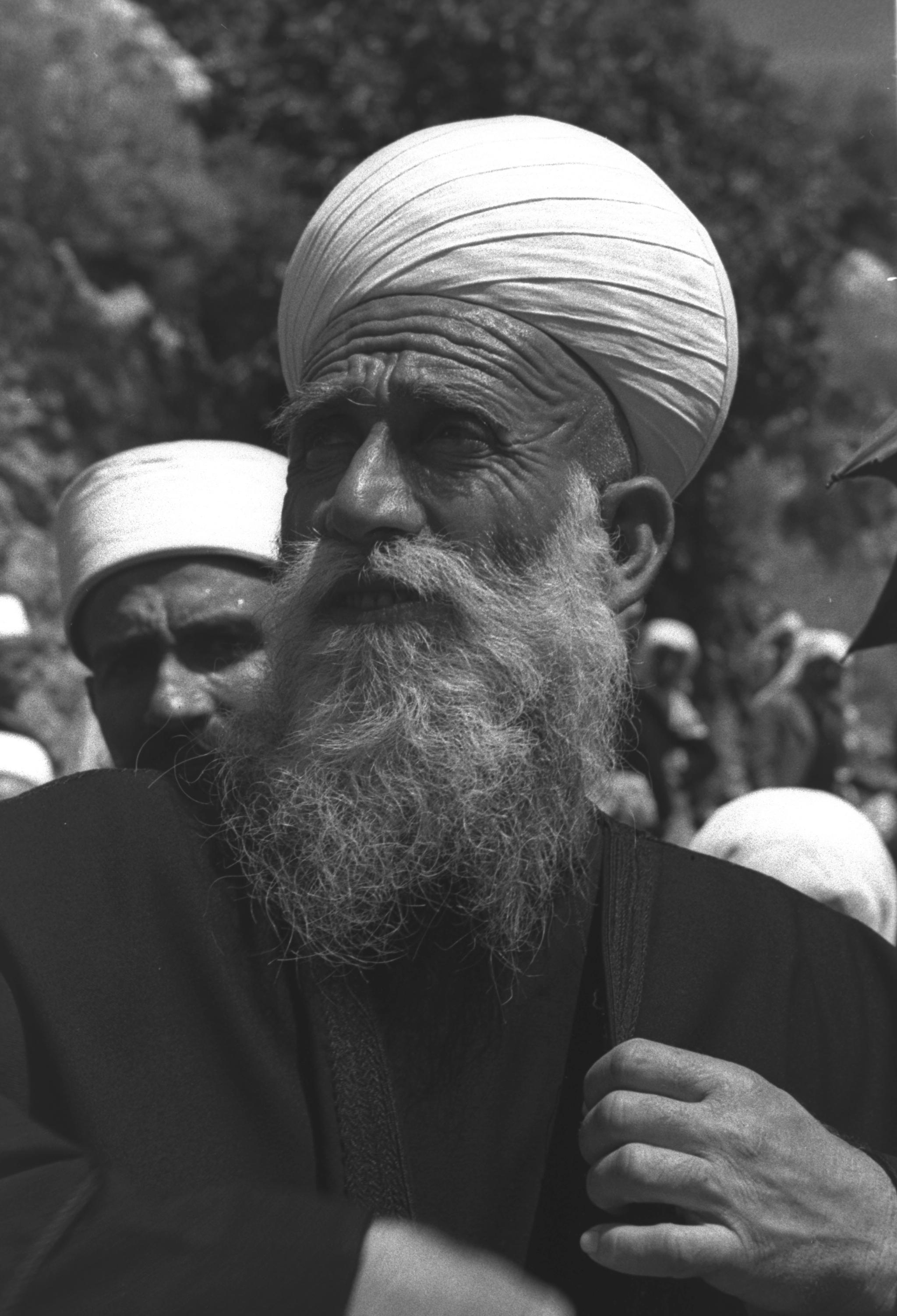
- Sheikh Amin Tarif, 1950
- Born: 1898; Julis, Acre Sanjak, Ottoman Empire
- Died: 2 October 1993 (aged 94–95); Julis, Israel
- Occupations: Qadi, spiritual leader
- Known for: Spiritual leader of the Druze community in Mandatory Palestine and Israel
- Awards: Israel Prize (1990)

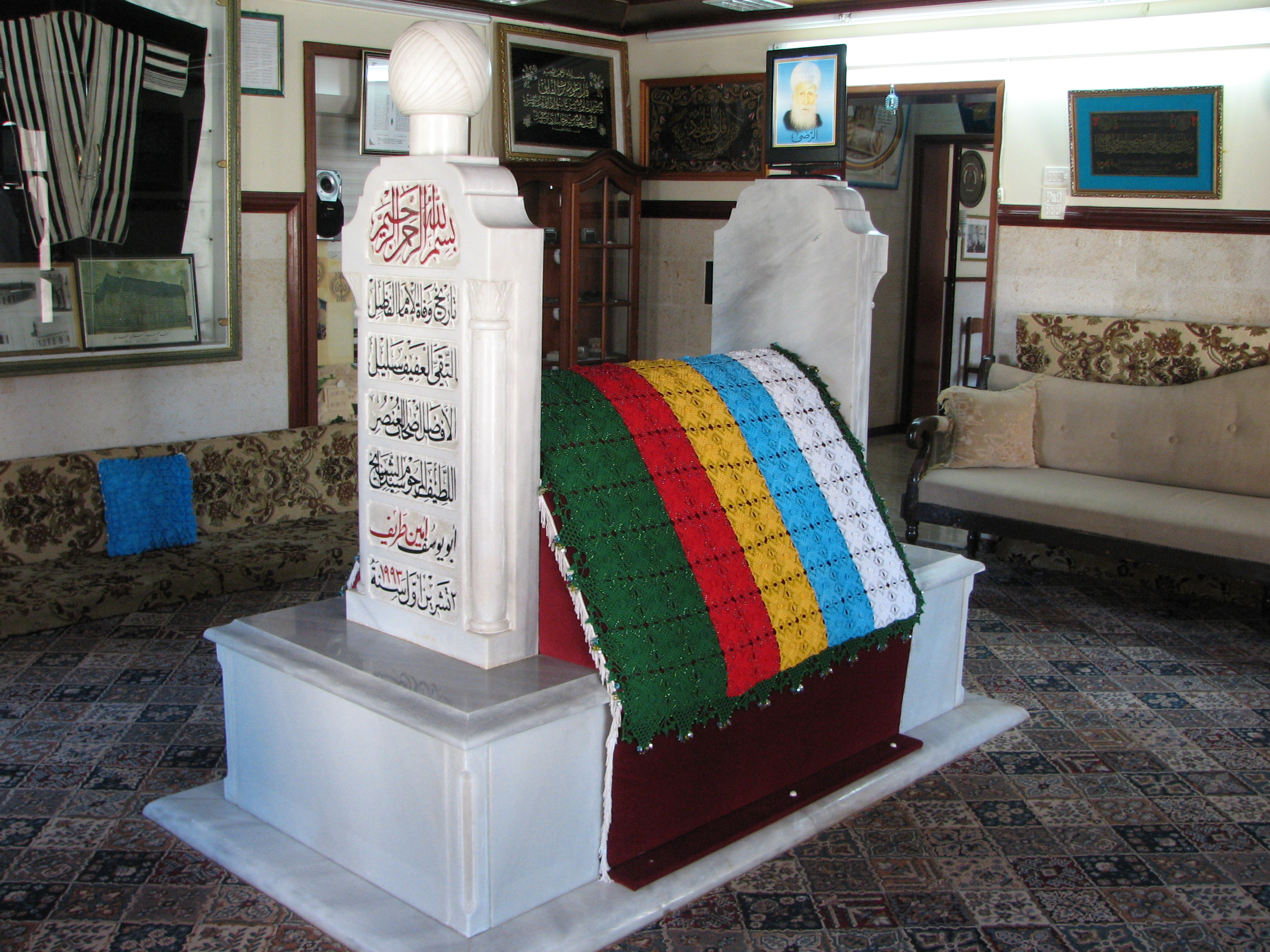
The Grave of Sheikh Ameen Tareef in Julis, Israel.

Amin Tarif (Arabic: أمين طريف, Hebrew: אמין טריף; born 1898 – October 2, 1993) was the qadi, or spiritual leader, of the Druze in Mandatory Palestine from 1928 and then Israel until his death in 1993. Such was the esteem in which he was held among Druze internationally that Sheikh Amin was regarded by many within the community as the preeminent spiritual authority in the Druze world.

Sheikh Amin was born in 1898 in the village of Julis in Upper Western Galilee. One of four brothers and two sisters, Amin was the youngest son of Sheikh Tarif Tarif, spiritual leader of the Druze in Galilee from 1888 till his death.

In 1911, after graduating from fourth grade, Amin travelled to the Khalwat al-Bayada, near Hasbaya, in Mount Lebanon. There he studied the basics of the Druze religion, graduating in 1918. Returning to Julis, the Sheikh adopted an ascetic lifestyle according to Druze ideals, living modestly from grains grown for his own needs.

In 1928, following the death of his father, it was decided to appoint Amin as spiritual leader of the Druze community. In addition to serving as his community's spiritual leader, Tarif served as Chairman of the Druze Religious Court of Appeals from 1963 and managed the assets of Maqam Nabi Shu'ayb - a religious complex that Druze believe houses the tomb of the Prophet Jethro.

Despite the esteem in which Amin was held, his relationship with Druze in neighbouring states was complicated by the Sheikh's loyalty to the State of Israel. In 1977, following complaints from the community in Lebanon that Israeli shelling threatened the Khalwat al-Bayada, he advised Druze members of the Knesset to ask questions of the Israeli government.

In 1990, Amin was awarded the Israel Prize for his special contribution to society and the State of Israel, being one of the few non-Jews to receive the award.

Sheikh Amin died on October 2, 1993. The Israeli President, Ezer Weizman, the Prime Minister Yitzhak Rabin and the Chairman of the Knesset were among the dignitaries present at his funeral. Simultaneously, additional ceremonies, attended by tens of thousands of Druze, took place in Syria and Lebanon.

The Sheikh was buried in a room at his family home in Julis. His tomb has since become a place of pilgrimage - large numbers of Druze visit the Sheikh's resting-place annually on the anniversary of his death.

Sheikh Amin's grandson, Mowafak Tarif, succeeded his grandfather as the spiritual leader of Israel's Druze.

In June 2009 sectarian clashes between Druze and Christian Arab youth in the town of Shefa-'Amr were sparked by the posting of a YouTube clip dishonouring Sheikh Amin's memory.

== See also ==
- Druze in Israel
- List of Israeli Druze
- List of Israel Prize recipients
- Saleh Tarif, the first non-Jewish Israeli government minister and the grandson of Sheikh Amin Tarif
- Mowafak Tarif, spiritual leader of the Druze in Israel and the grandson of Sheikh Amin Tarif
