= Nabi Shu'ayb =

Druze religious shrine, tomb of their prophet Shuayb

Coordinates: 32°48′17″N 35°27′2″E

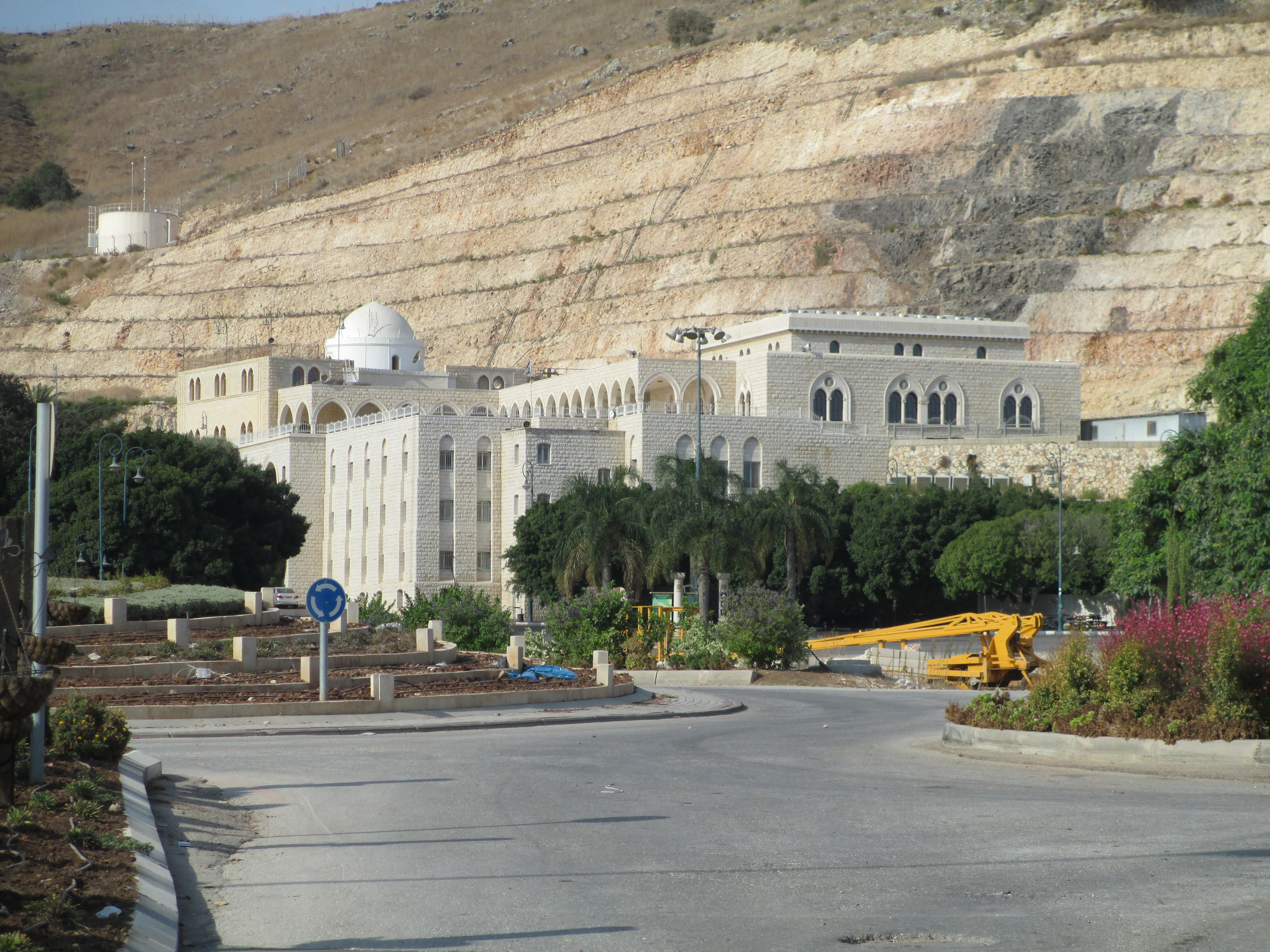
The complex of Nabi Shuayb, believed to host the tomb of Shuayb

The Station of Nabi Shuʿayb (Arabic: مقام النبي شعيب also transliterated Neby Shoaib, Nabi Shuaib, or Nebi Shu'eib, meaning "the Prophet Shuaib". Hebrew: הנביא שועיב, or יתרו), known in English as Jethro's tomb, is a religious shrine west of Tiberias, in the Lower Galilee region of Israel, containing the purported tomb of Shuayb, considered a prophet and identified with the biblical Jethro, Moses' father-in-law. The complex hosting the tomb is the most important religious site in the Druze faith. A Druze religious festival takes place in the shrine every year in April.

Shuayb was an object of traditional veneration by the Druze in Israel. The shrine figured in the Israeli-Arab war of 1948 as a place where Druze took vows (nidhr) and made ziyarat ("pilgrimages"). After the 1948 war, Israel placed the maqam (shrine) under exclusive Druze care.

The tomb of Shuaib, originally built outside the village of Hittin, has been a site of the annual Ziyarat al-Nabi Shu'ayb pilgrimage for the Druze for centuries, with its first mention in historical sources dating back to the 12th century CE. The modern structure dates to 1880.

== History ==
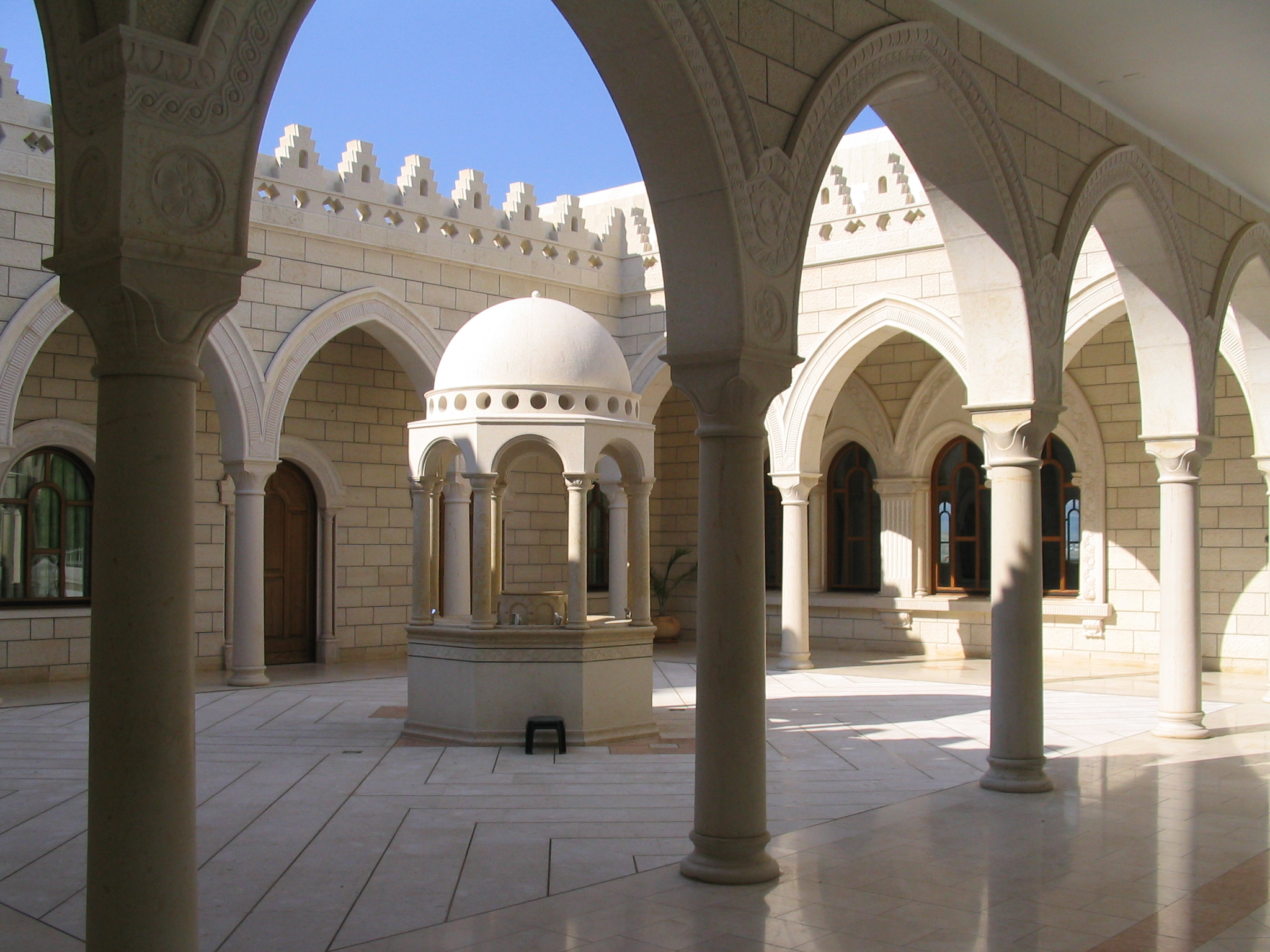
The courtyard of the complex

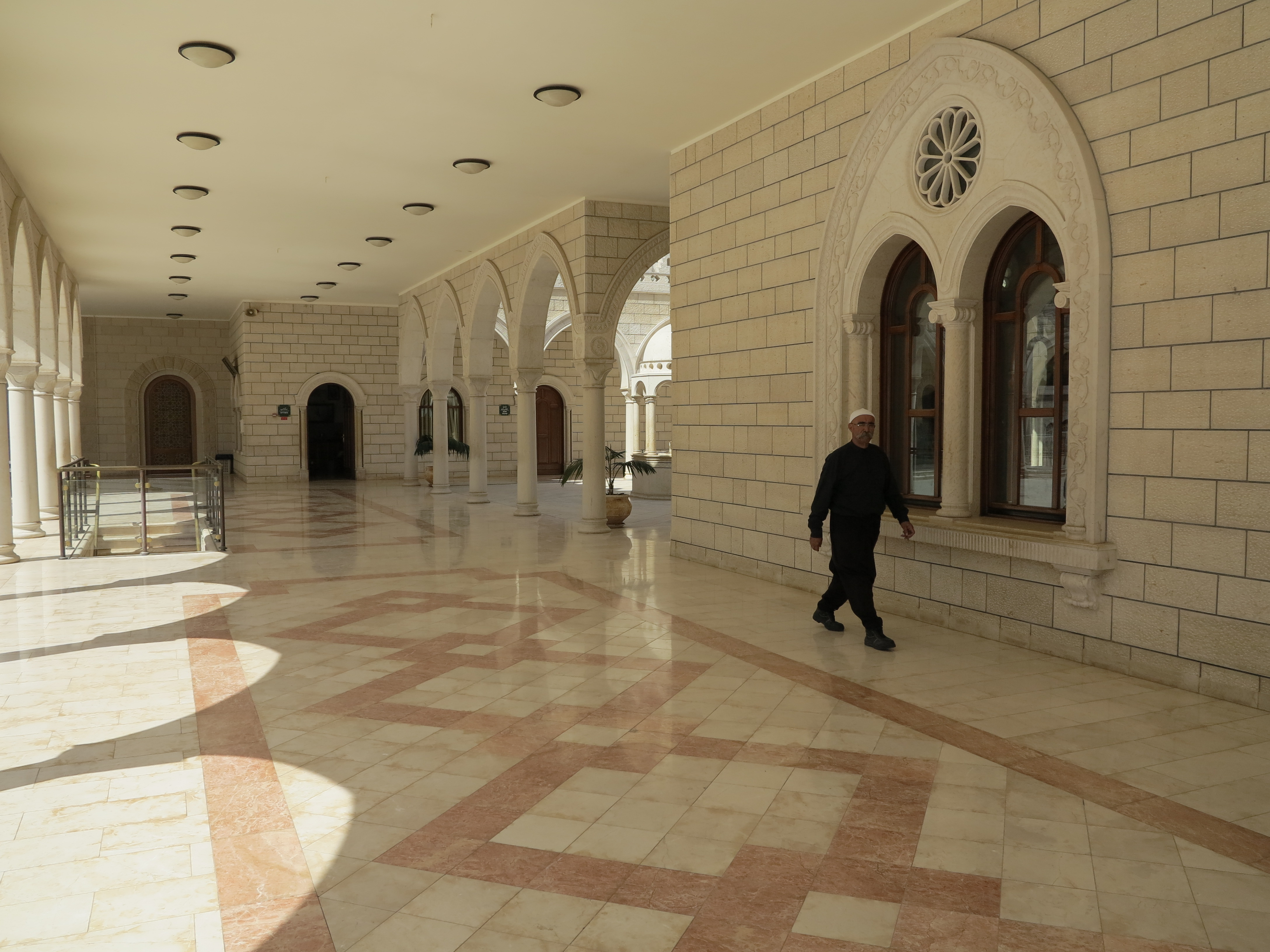
Another courtyard view

In Druze tradition, it is believed that towards the end of his life, Shuʿayb took refuge in a cave outside Hittin (a village just west of Tiberias), where he would die in old age. His followers buried him at the site and placed a tombstone at his grave. Another Druze tradition holds that the Ayyubid sultan Saladin had a dream the night prior to the Battle of Hittin in which an angel promised him victory on the condition that after the battle, he would ride his horse westward; then, where the horse would stop, the angel said he would find the burial site of Shuʿayb. The tradition holds that when Saladin's dream was realized, the Druze built a shrine for Shuʿayb at the site.

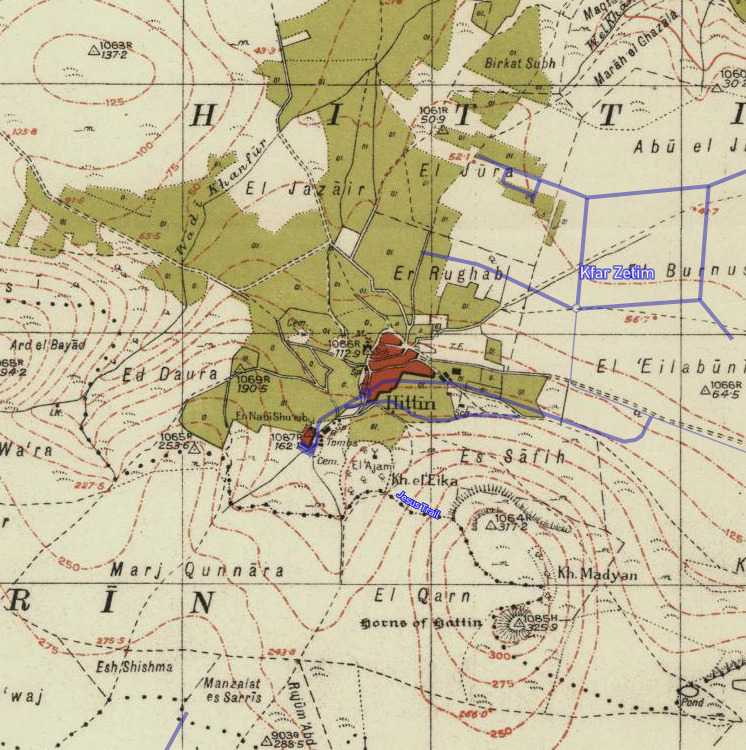
Nabi Shu'ayb in a 1940s Survey of Palestine map, shown just outside the historical Palestinian town of Hittin, and overlaid (in blue) with the modern road layout showing the Israeli moshav of Kfar Zeitim.

Nabi Shuʿayb has been expanded and renovated over time. The older section of the existing structure was built in the 1880s, under the direction of Sheikh Muhanna Tarif, the shaykh al-aql (Druze spiritual leader) of Julis. Sheikh Muhanna summoned an assembly of religious leaders in the community to discuss and collaborate on its construction. A delegation of high-ranking community members traveled to Syria and Lebanon in order to collect funds for new construction and renovations and the local Druze of the Galilee and Mount Carmel also made considerable contributions.

After Israel's establishment in 1948, and the total depopulation of Hittin which had been a predominantly Muslim village, the Druze were granted full custodianship over the tomb, and an additional 100 dunams surrounding it. Under the leadership of Sheikh Amin Tarif, the shrine was then renovated and numerous rooms were added for the hosting of pilgrims. The Israeli government also paved the road leading to Nabi Shuʿayb and provided electricity and water infrastructure services there.

== Pilgrimage ==
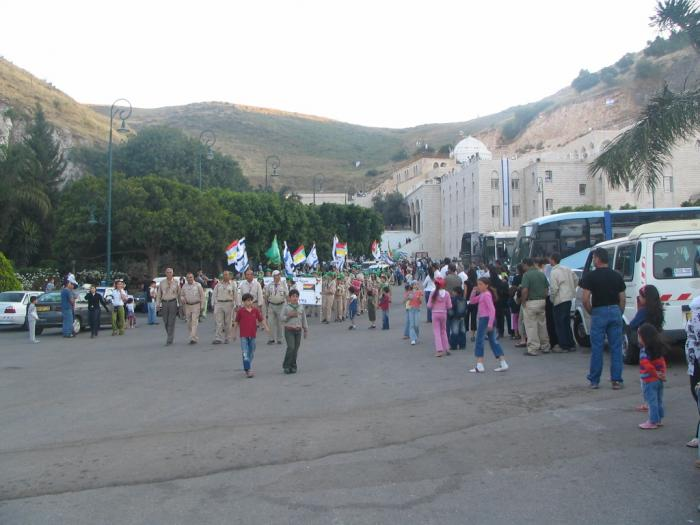
Druze scouts visiting the tomb

The first mention of the tomb dates back to the 12th century CE, and the Druze have held religious festivals there for centuries. According to Druze tradition, the imprint of Shuaib's left foot (da'sa) can be seen on the grave. Pilgrims visiting the site pour oil into the imprint, and then rub the oil over their body in order to be blessed with good fortune.

The Druze customarily had no fixed date for their annual pilgrimage, which generally occurred sometime in the spring. When the Israeli government granted official recognition of the pilgrimage as a Druze religious holiday, the dates were standardized, such that the event now takes place between April 25 and April 28. During the festivities, mass celebrations are held at Nabi Shu'aib, and Druze religious leaders gather there for ritual purposes and to discuss religious questions. Prior to Israel's establishment, Druze from Syria and Lebanon also used to participate in the festival. After the formation of the Syrian transitional government, approval was given to Druze from Syria to visit again in April 2025.

== See also ==
- Jabal Al-Nabi Shu'ayb
- Israeli Druze
- Amin Tarif
- Religious significance of the Syrian region
- Ziyarat al-Nabi Shuʿayb

== Bibliography ==
- Petersen, Andrew (2001). A Gazetteer of Buildings in Muslim Palestine (British Academy Monographs in Archaeology). Vol. I. Oxford University Press. pp. 148−150. ISBN 978-0-19-727011-0.
