= Ziyara (Druze) =

Annual Druze pilgrimage

Coordinates: 32°48′27.65″N 35°27′18.26″E

Ziyara (Arabic: زِيَارَة, romanized: Ziyāra) is the Druze pilgrimage observed annually between 25 and 28 April at Nabi Shu'ayb, a shrine that contains the maqām (purported tomb) of the prophet Shuʿayb (Jethro). It is officially recognized as a public holiday in Israel.

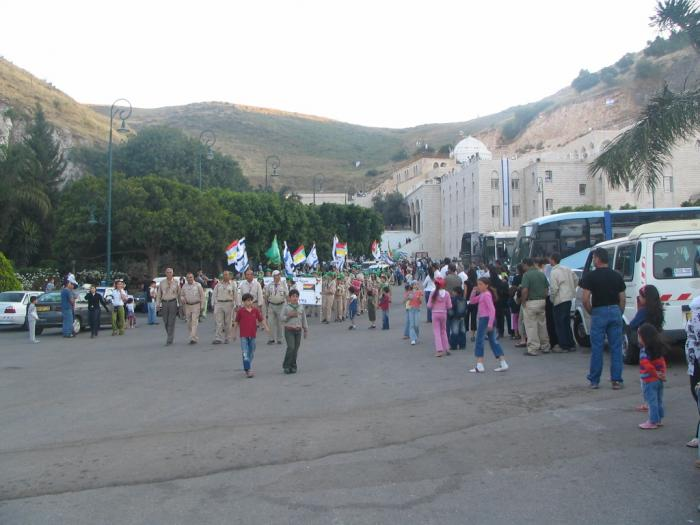
Druze scouts visiting the tomb during the Ziyara

== Observation ==
The celebration starts on 25 April and concludes on 28 April, with many religious leaders from all the religions in Israel, and also political leaders (occasionally also the PM), coming to congratulate the Israeli Druze community during their festivities at the Maqam al-Nabi Shu'ayb. Religious leaders or sheikhs from Mount Carmel, the Galilee and the Golan Heights take the opportunity to discuss religious issues.

== See also ==
- Israeli Druze
- Nabi Shu'ayb
- Amin Tarif
- Ziyara
