= Muwaffaq Tarif =

Druzite religious leader (born 1963)

Sheikh Muwaffaq Tarif
- موفق طريف
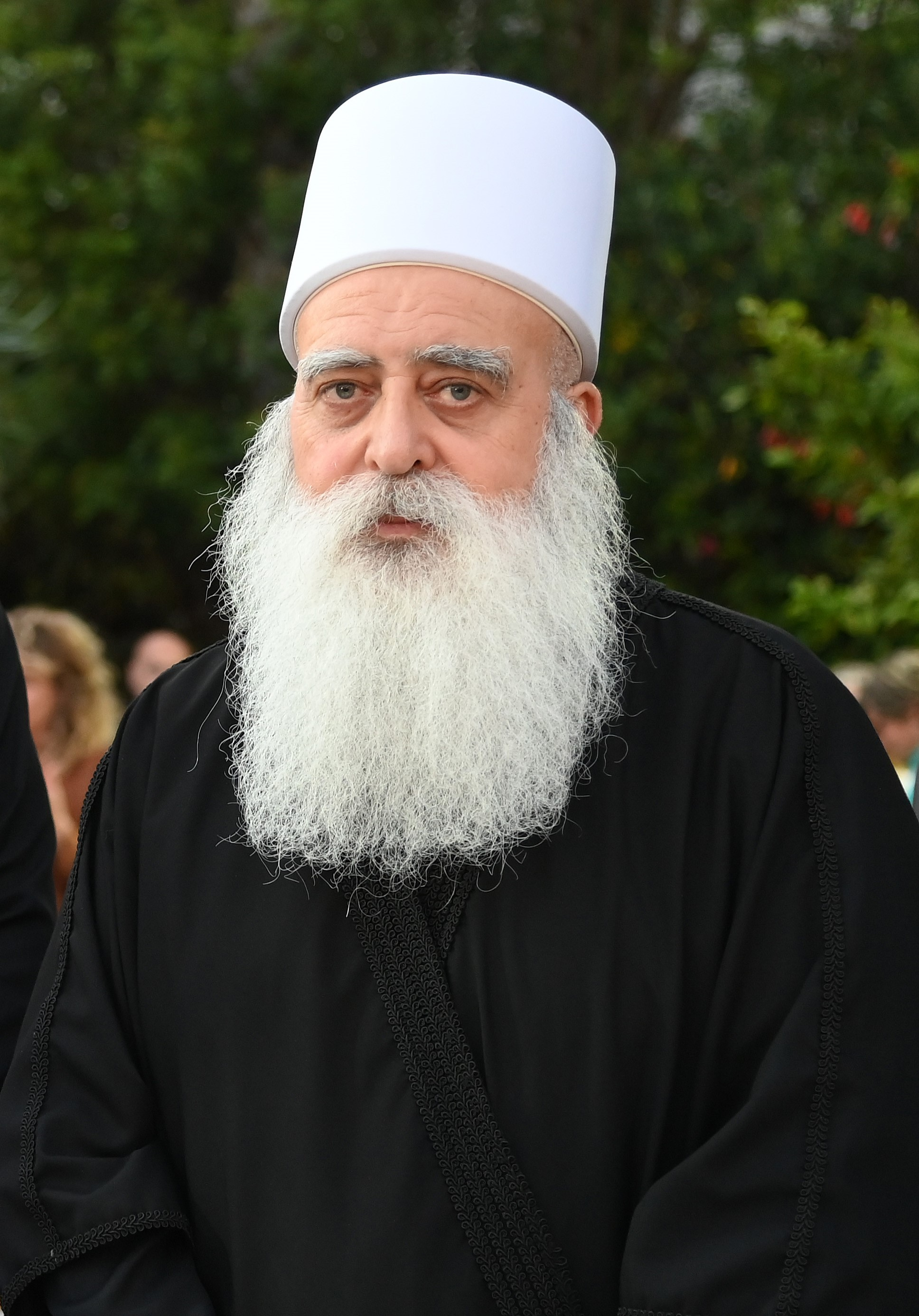
- Tarif in 2023

Personal life
- Born: 1963 (age 62–63) Julis, Israel
- Known for: Spiritual leader of the Druze community in Israel

Religious life
- Religion: Druze

Muwaffaq Tarif (Arabic: موفق طريف, romanized: Muwaffaq Ṭarīf; Hebrew: מוואפק טריף; born 1963) is a Druze religious leader, and the main sheikh of the Druze in Israel.

== Biography ==
Tarif was born in Julis, a Druze village in northern Israel. His family has been leading the Druze community in the southern Levant since Ottoman rule in 1753. He inherited the position of spiritual leader in 1993 upon the death of his grandfather, Amin Tarif.

He is a graduate of the Higher School for Druze Religious Studies in Khalwat al-Bayada, Lebanon. He also graduated from the Faculty of Law of the Ono Academic College, and was awarded an honorary doctorate from the University of Haifa in 2010.

Tarif and the mayor of Shefa-'Amr signed a declaration in January 2004 calling on non-Jews living in Israel to observe the Noahide Laws. He was selected by the Ministerial Committee for Symbols and Ceremonies to light a torch at the torch-lighting ceremony to mark the 70th anniversary of the establishment of the State of Israel in April 2018.

He met with U.S. officials in January 2025, including Senator Ted Cruz, to secure U.S. protection for the Druze in Syria under the new Islamic rule after the fall of the Assad regime. After the 2025 massacres of Syrian Druze, Tarif urged Israel and the international community to intervene.

== Awards ==
In 2025, President Isaac Herzog's office named him among the nine recipients of the Presidential Medal of Honour.
