= Julis =

Julis: ג'וליס; جولس
- Local council (from 1967)

Hebrew transcription(s)
  - ISO 259: Ǧúlis
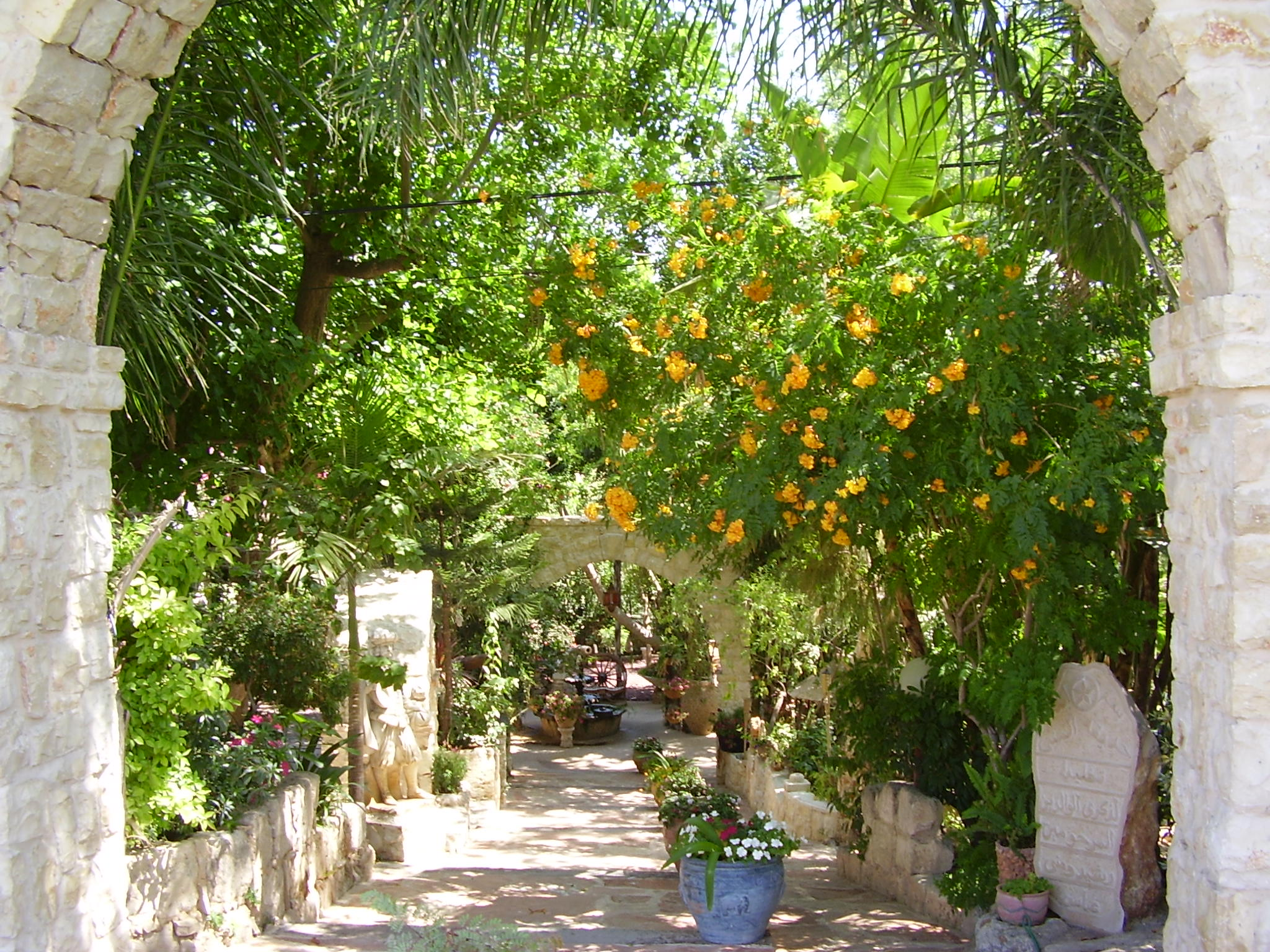

- Location within Northwest Israel Location within Israel
- Coordinates: 32°56′39″N 35°11′9″E
- Grid position: 167/260 PAL
- Country: Israel
- District: Northern
- Subdistrict: Acre
- Natural Region: Yehi'am

Government
  - Head of Municipality: Hussam Kabishi

Area
  - Total: 3,970 dunams (3.97 km^{2}; 1.53 sq mi)

Population (2024)
  - Total: 6,821
  - Density: 1,720/km^{2} (4,450/sq mi)

Julis (Arabic: جولس Jūlis, Hebrew: ג'וּלִס G'ulis) is a Druze village and local council in the Northern District of Israel. In 2024 it had a population of 6,821.

== Etymology ==
According to local legend, the name is derived from "Julius," the name of a Roman commander who camped in the area. Others say it is from the Arabic word for "sitting" - "jalis", as it is located on lower hills than the surrounding villages, and thus seems to be sitting.

== History ==
Julis was a Jewish village in Talmudic times and had a Jewish presence in the Late Middle Ages (14th-16th centuries). In 1388, Sa'adia Ben Ya'akov copied "The Sufficient Guide" by Tanhum of Jerusalem, "in the town of Julis... near Acre."

=== Ottoman Empire ===
According to the 1596 Ottoman tax records Julis had a predominantly Druze population, with a total of 79 households. The taxable produce comprised wheat, barley, "summer crops", fruit trees, and "goats and bees". Julis also had a press for olive oil or grape syrup. Total taxes were 7,047 akçe. During the 16th century there was also a small Jewish population.

In the early part of the 18th century Julis was one of the major cotton producing villages in the area. Later in the same century it was one of five villages in nahiya ("subdistrict") Sahil Akka (Acre coast), which were owned directly by the governor of Acre, and were exempt from the usual Ottoman taxes.

A map by Pierre Jacotin from Napoleon's invasion of 1799 showed the place, named as Gioules.

In 1875, the French explorer Victor Guérin visited the village, which he called Djoules. He noted that "before arriving at Julis I came upon a small plateau pierced by many cisterns. The cisterns and the cut stones which are built up in the modern houses show that the place is the site of an ancient town or village. On a neighbouring hill a waly is consecrated to the Sheikh Aly.'" In 1881, the PEF's Survey of Western Palestine described Julis as "a village built of stone containing about 200 Druzes, surrounded by olives and arable land."

A population list from about 1887 showed that Julis had 360 inhabitants; all Druze.

=== British Mandate ===
In the 1922 census of Palestine, conducted by the British Mandate authorities, Jules had a total population of 446 residents; 442 Druzes, 3 Christians and 1 Muslim. All the Christians were Orthodox. In the 1931 census it had increased to a population of 614; 586 Druse, 26 Christians, and 2 Muslims, in a total of 123 houses.

In the 1945 statistics the population of Julis was 820; 40 Christians and 780 classified as others (i.e. Druze), and the total land area was 14,708 dunams, according to an official land and population survey. Of this, 1,347 dunams were plantations and irrigable land, 6,568 used for cereals, while 63 dunams were built-up (urban) land.

=== Israel ===
Julis was captured by the Israeli army during Operation Dekel, 8–14 July 1948. Unlike many of the neighboring villages the inhabitants remained in their homes.

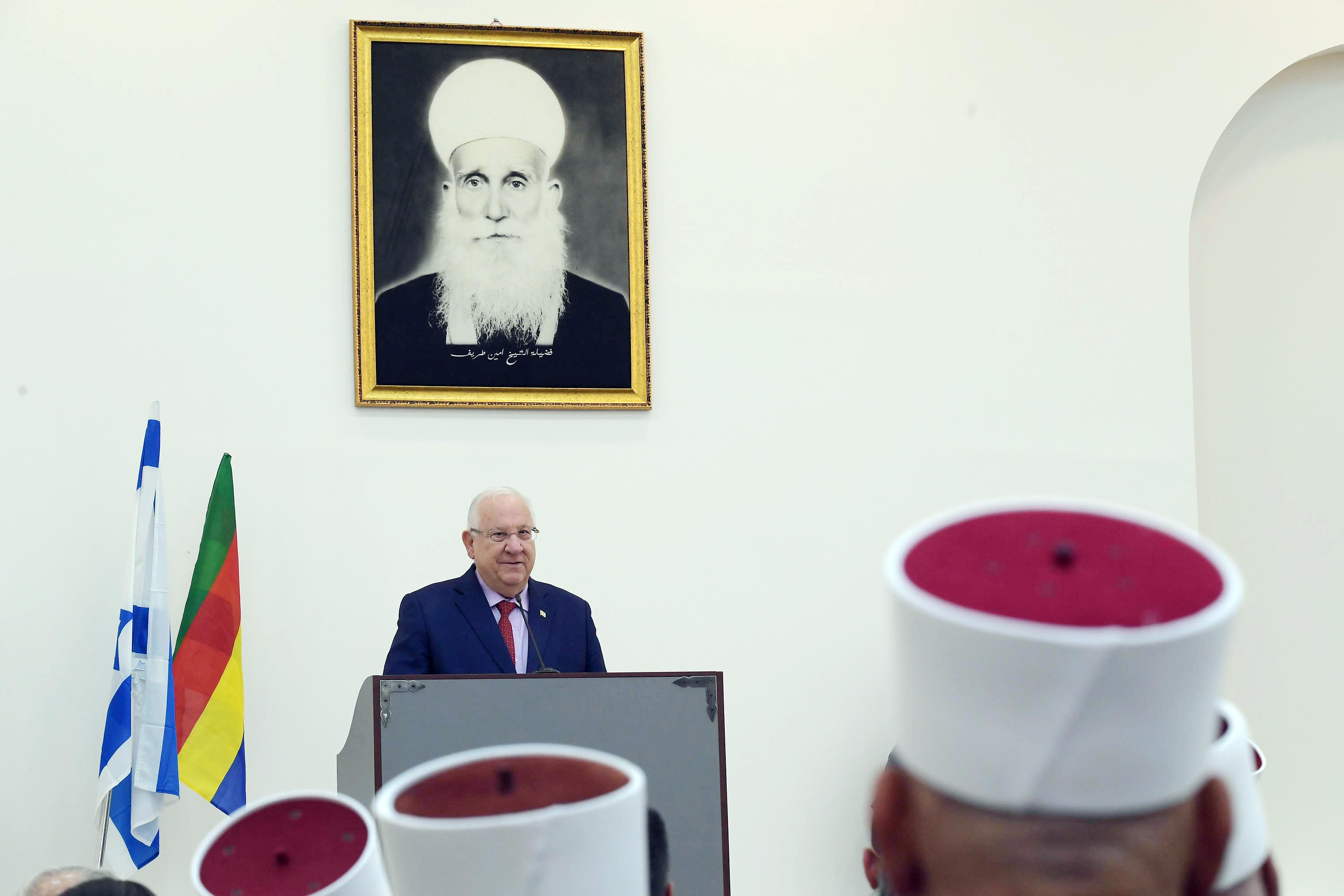
President Reuven Rivlin in Julis, 2018

In 1967, Julis achieved local council status. The head of the council was Salman Hino. At the end of 2007, the town had 5,400 residents. The annual population growth rate was 1.8%. The residents are Druze.

In 2000, a high percentage (72.1%, compared to 60.3% in Tel Aviv) of all high school students received a matriculation certificate. The mean income was NIS 5,067 per month (2007), compared to a national average of NIS 6,743.

== Demographics ==
Historical population
Year	Pop.	±%
1972	2,100	—
1983	3,400	+61.9%
1995	4,300	+26.5%
2008	5,600	+30.2%
2022	6,543	+16.8%
2024	6,821	+4.2%

In 2022, 99.7% of the population was Druze and 0.3% was Muslim.

== Landmarks ==
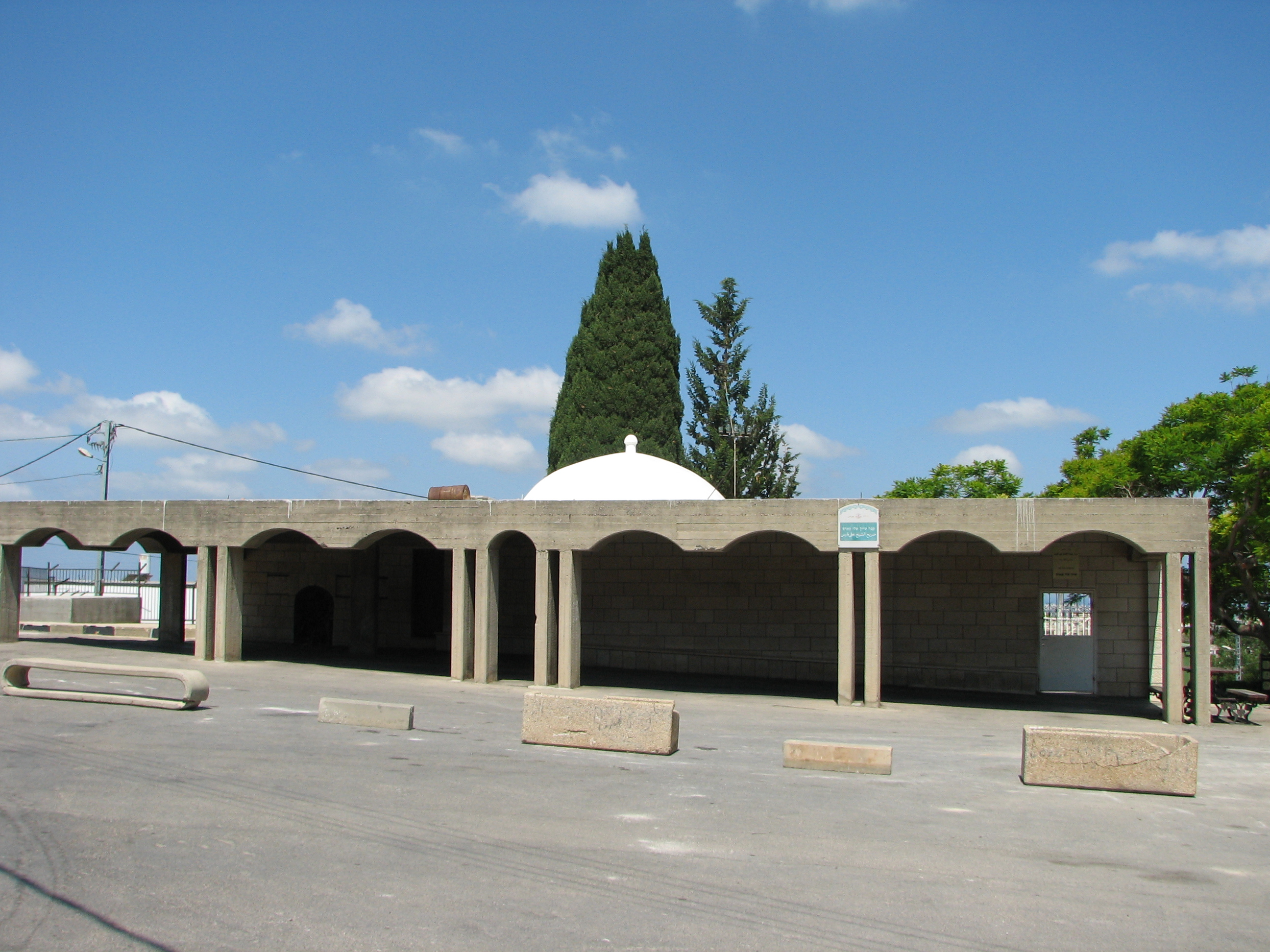
Grave of Sheikh Ali Fares, Julis

- Druze Center House
- Maqam Shaykh al-Farsi - Located to the south of the old village, consisting of two older buildings and a domed one. In an open area there are two cenotaphs with inscriptions which record the life of Shaykh al-Farsi. His date of death is given as 1167 H (1753-1754 C.E.). According to an inscription, the construction of the maqam (shrine) started in August, 1754.
- Sheik Ali Faris cave - Located about 2 kilometers North-East of Julis. In this cave Sheik Ali Faris resided and did his contemplation.

== Voting Patterns ==
In the 2022 election, 77 percent of voters in Julis voted for the parties of the center-left coalition led by Yair Lapid, while 19 percent voted for the parties of the right-wing coalition led by Benjamin Netanyahu and 3 percent voted for the Arab parties.

In the 2026 election, 82 percent of voters in Julis voted for the parties of the center-left coalition led by Gadi Eisenkot, while 14 percent voted for the parties of the right-wing coalition led by Benjamin Netanyahu and 1 percent voted for the Arab parties. An additional 1.6 percent voted for the Reservists, and 0.8 percent voted for Amcha Yisrael. Voter turnout increased 31 percent from the 2022 election.

== Notable people ==
- Amin Tarif
- Mowafaq Tarif
- Salah Tarif
- Monia Heno

== See also ==
- Arab localities in Israel
- Druze in Israel
- F.C. Julis

== Bibliography ==
- Barron, J.B., ed. (1923). Palestine: Report and General Abstracts of the Census of 1922. Government of Palestine.
- Cohen, Amnon (1973). Palestine in the Eighteenth Century: Patterns of Government and Administration. Jerusalem: Magnes Press, Hebrew University. ISBN 1-59045-955-5. Cited in Petersen, (2001)
- Conder, C.R.; Kitchener, H.H. (1881). The Survey of Western Palestine: Memoirs of the Topography, Orography, Hydrography, and Archaeology. Vol. 1. London: Committee of the Palestine Exploration Fund.
- Government of Palestine, Department of Statistics (1945). Village Statistics, April, 1945.
- Guérin, V. (1880). Description Géographique Historique et Archéologique de la Palestine (in French). Vol. 3: Galilee, pt. 2. Paris: L'Imprimerie Nationale.
- Hadawi, S. (1970). Village Statistics of 1945: A Classification of Land and Area ownership in Palestine. Palestine Liberation Organization Research Center.
- Hütteroth, W.-D.; Abdulfattah, K. (1977). Historical Geography of Palestine, Transjordan and Southern Syria in the Late 16th Century. Erlanger Geographische Arbeiten, Sonderband 5. Erlangen, Germany: Vorstand der Fränkischen Geographischen Gesellschaft. ISBN 3-920405-41-2. Cited in Petersen, 2001.
- Karmon, Y. (1960). "An Analysis of Jacotin's Map of Palestine" (PDF). Israel Exploration Journal. 10 (3, 4): 155–173, 244–253. Archived from the original (PDF) on 2019-12-22.
- Mills, E., ed. (1932). Census of Palestine 1931. Population of Villages, Towns and Administrative Areas. Jerusalem: Government of Palestine.
- Morris, B. (1987). The Birth of the Palestinian refugee problem, 1947-1949. Cambridge University Press. ISBN 0-521-33028-9.
- Palmer, E.H. (1881). The Survey of Western Palestine: Arabic and English Name Lists Collected During the Survey by Lieutenants Conder and Kitchener, R. E. Transliterated and Explained by E.H. Palmer. Committee of the Palestine Exploration Fund.
- Petersen, Andrew (2001). A Gazetteer of Buildings in Muslim Palestine (British Academy Monographs in Archaeology). Vol. 1. Oxford University Press. ISBN 978-0-19-727011-0.
- Schumacher, G. (1888). "Population list of the Liwa of Akka". Quarterly Statement - Palestine Exploration Fund. 20: 169–191.
- Sharon, M. (2016). Corpus Inscriptionum Arabicarum Palaestinae, J (I). Vol. 6. BRILL. ISBN 90-04-32479-8.
