= Salman Habaka =

Israeli Druze military officer (1990–2023)

- سلمان حبقة
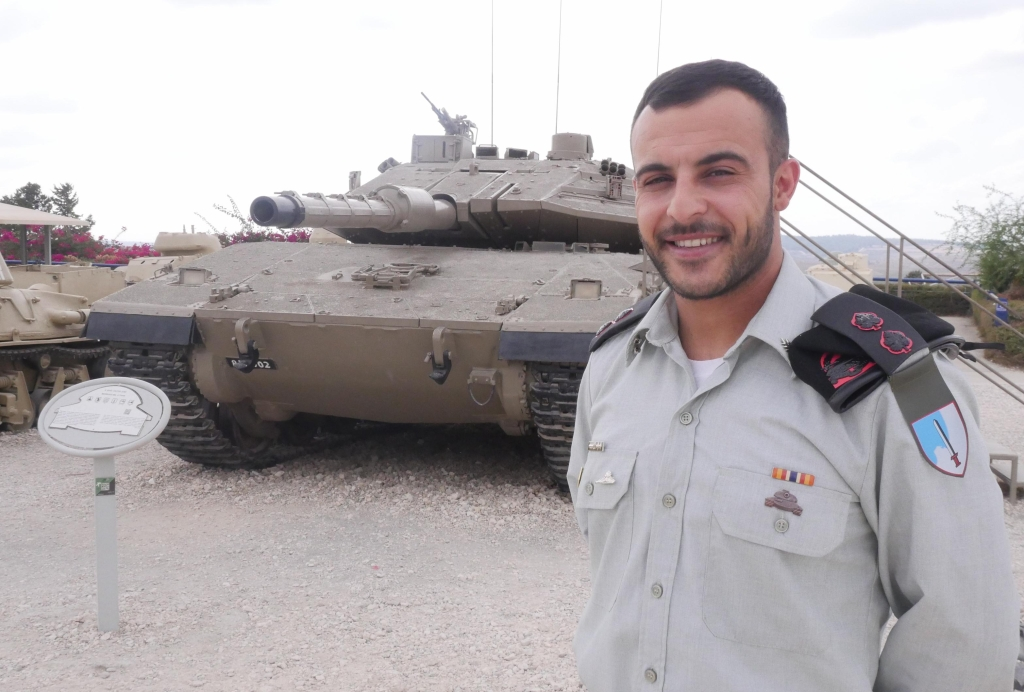
- Born: August 1990; Yanuh-Jat, Israel
- Died: 2 November 2023 (age 33); Beit Hanoun, Gaza Strip, Palestine
- Cause of death: Killed in Action
- Burial place: Yanuh-Jat
- Children: 1
- Military career
- Allegiance: Israel
- Branch: Israeli Ground Forces
- Rank: Lieutenant Colonel
- Unit: 188th Armored Brigade: 53rd Battalion
- Conflicts: Gaza war; Battle of 7th October; Israeli invasion of the Gaza Strip; Battle of Beit Hanoun †

Sgan aluf Salman Habaka (Hebrew: סלמאן חבקה; August 1990 – 2 November 2023) was an Israeli military officer who was killed in action during the Gaza war. Born in the Northern District village of Yanuh-Jat into a Druze family, he joined the Armored Corps of the Israel Defence Forces in 2009 and was subsequently appointed commander of the 188th Armored Brigade's 53rd Battalion. While fighting in the Gaza Strip in 2023, Habaka was killed by Palestinian militants.

== Career ==
Salman studied at the "Acre Kzine Yam" in middle school and high school, before the military recruitment he spent a whole year at the "Kerem El" pre-military training school and in August 2009 he joined the Israel Defence Forces and started his military career in the Armored Corps.

During the Gaza war, he became known for his actions at Be'eri, the location of the Be'eri massacre of the October 7 attacks; he was one of the first soldiers to arrive in the area as the scope of Hamas' incursion was becoming known, having travelled in two tanks with a number of his soldiers to join a paratrooper contingent already at the location. Upon the orders of lieutenant colonel Barrak Hiram, Habaka shelled houses before soldiers searched them for hostages. On 2 November 2023, he was killed in action in Gaza during the Israeli invasion of the Gaza Strip.

== Personal life ==
A member of the Druze minority from Yanuh-Jat, Salman built his house, got married and started a family. Salman was described as a family man and a member of his community. He left behind his parents, three brothers and two sisters, a wife and a two-year-old baby.

== See also ==
- Alim Abdallah (1982–2023) – Another ethnic Druze and IDF Lt. Col. from the same village of Yanuh-Jat, killed in the simultaneous 2023 Israel–Lebanon border clashes
- Casualties of the 2023 Israel–Hamas war
