= Kisra-Sumei =

Druze town in northern Israel

Kisra-Sumei: כִּסְרָא-סֻמֵיע; كسرا-سميع
- Local council
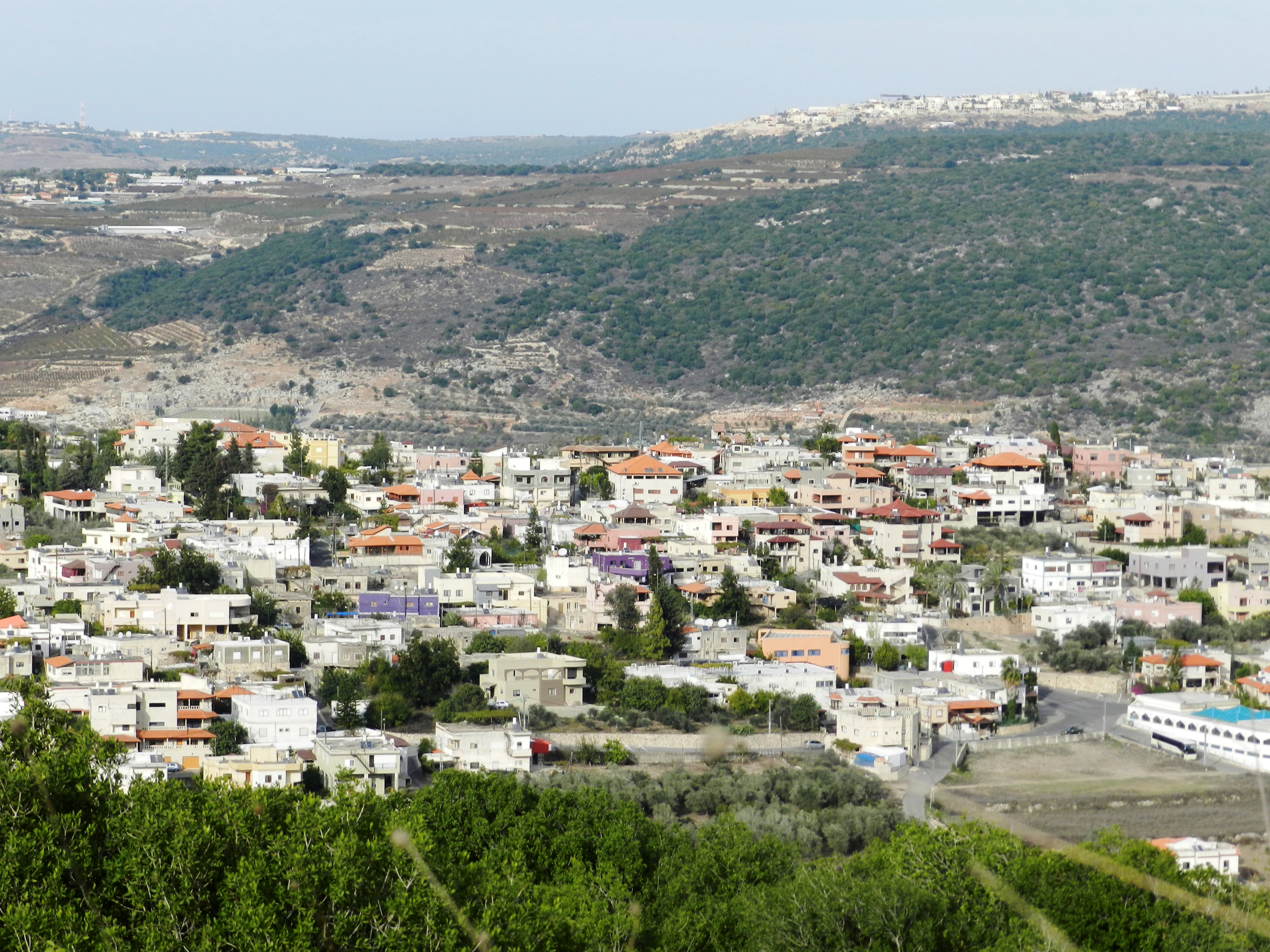

- Location within Northwest Israel Location within Israel
- Coordinates: 32°57′50″N 35°18′08″E
- Country: Israel
- District: Northern
- Subdistrict: Acre
- Natural Region: Yehi'am
- Founded: 1990

Area
  - Total: 14,163 dunams (14.163 km^{2}; 5.468 sq mi)

Population (2024)
  - Total: 9,549
  - Density: 674.2/km^{2} (1,746/sq mi)

Kisra-Sumei (Arabic: كسرا-سميع; Hebrew: כִּסְרָא-סֻמֵיע) is a town and local council in the western Galilee in the Northern District of Israel. In 2024 it had a population of 9,549. In April 2019, 95% of the population were Israeli Arabs of the Druze community, with a small Christian minority. The town has a Druze holy place as well as a statue to the Druze leader and Syrian nationalist revolutionary Sultan al-Atrash.

The town is the result of a merger between the villages of Kisra and Sumei and it was recognised as a local council in 1990.

== History ==
Kafr Sumei is identified with the late ancient village of Caparasima (or Kefar Simay), mentioned in John Moschus' Spiritual Meadow, a Byzantine ascetic writing dating from the 7th century.

Kisra appears on the 1870s SWP map (sheet 3, square Nf). In the connected memoirs, Conder and Kitchener mention the village as "containing about 150 Druzes", and note in terms of archaeological remains "foundations and heaps of well-cut stones".

== Demographics ==
In 2022, 95.6% of the population was Druze, 3.3% was Christian and 1.1% was Muslim.

== Climate ==
Kisra-Sumei has a mediterranean climate (Köppen climate classification: Csa). The average annual temperature is 17.7 °C (63.9 °F), and around 771 mm (30.35 in) of precipitation falls annually.

Climate data for Kisra-Sumei
Month	Jan	Feb	Mar	Apr	May	Jun	Jul	Aug	Sep	Oct	Nov	Dec	Year
Mean daily maximum °C (°F)	12.6 (54.7)	13.5 (56.3)	16.1 (61.0)	20.5 (68.9)	25.6 (78.1)	28.5 (83.3)	29.7 (85.5)	30.3 (86.5)	28.2 (82.8)	25.8 (78.4)	20.5 (68.9)	15 (59)	22.2 (71.9)
Daily mean °C (°F)	9.6 (49.3)	10.3 (50.5)	12.2 (54.0)	15.6 (60.1)	20 (68)	23 (73)	24.3 (75.7)	25 (77)	23.3 (73.9)	21.1 (70.0)	16.6 (61.9)	11.9 (53.4)	17.7 (63.9)
Mean daily minimum °C (°F)	6.7 (44.1)	7.2 (45.0)	8.3 (46.9)	10.7 (51.3)	14.4 (57.9)	17.5 (63.5)	19 (66)	19.8 (67.6)	18.4 (65.1)	16.4 (61.5)	12.7 (54.9)	8.8 (47.8)	13.3 (56.0)
Average precipitation mm (inches)	197 (7.8)	152 (6.0)	101 (4.0)	38 (1.5)	11 (0.4)	0 (0)	0 (0)	0 (0)	2 (0.1)	24 (0.9)	85 (3.3)	161 (6.3)	771 (30.4)

== Voting Patterns ==
In the 2026 election, 48 percent of voters in Kisra-Sumei voted for the parties of the right-wing coalition led by Benjamin Netanyahu, while 46 percent voted for the parties of the center-left coalition led by Gadi Eisenkot and 5 percent voted for the Arab parties. An additional 0.6 percent voted for the Reservists, and 0.4 percent voted for Amcha Yisrael. Voter turnout more than doubled compared with the 2022 election.

== See also ==
- Arab localities in Israel
- Druze in Israel

== Bibliography ==
- Barron, J. B., ed. (1923). Palestine: Report and General Abstracts of the Census of 1922. Government of Palestine.
- Conder, Claude Reignier; Kitchener, H. H. (1881). The Survey of Western Palestine: Memoirs of the Topography, Orography, Hydrography, and Archaeology. Vol. 1. London: Committee of the Palestine Exploration Fund. (Kisra: 150, 185 Kafr Sumay': 148, 169 (=Guerin))
- Dauphin, C. (1998). La Palestine byzantine, Peuplement et Populations. BAR International Series 726 (in French). Vol. III : Catalogue. Oxford: Archeopress. ISBN 0-860549-05-4. (Dauphin pp. 637–8, 639)
- Frankel, Rafael (1988). "Topographical notes on the territory of Acre in the Crusader period". Israel Exploration Journal. 38 (4): 249–272.
- Guérin, Victor (1880). Description Géographique Historique et Archéologique de la Palestine (in French). Vol. 3: Galilee, pt. 2. Paris: L'Imprimerie Nationale. (Kesra: pp. 77-78; Kefr Semeia: p. 77)
- Hadawi, Sami (1970). Village Statistics of 1945: A Classification of Land and Area ownership in Palestine. Palestine Liberation Organization Research Center.
- Hütteroth, W.-D.; Abdulfattah, K. (1977). Historical Geography of Palestine, Transjordan and Southern Syria in the Late 16th Century. Erlanger Geographische Arbeiten, Sonderband 5. Erlangen, Germany: Vorstand der Fränkischen Geographischen Gesellschaft. ISBN 3-920405-41-2.(p. 192)
- Mills, E., ed. (1932). Census of Palestine 1931. Population of Villages, Towns and Administrative Areas. Jerusalem: Government of Palestine.
- Palmer, E. H. (1881). The Survey of Western Palestine: Arabic and English Name Lists Collected During the Survey by Lieutenants Conder and Kitchener, R. E. Transliterated and Explained by E.H. Palmer. Committee of the Palestine Exploration Fund. (Kisra: "The fragment"; p. 51; Kefr Sumeia: "The village of Sumeiả"; p. 44)
- Rhode, Harold (1979). Administration and Population of the Sancak of Safed in the Sixteenth Century. Columbia University. Archived from the original on 2016-10-10.
- Röhricht, R. (1893). (RRH) Regesta regni Hierosolymitani (MXCVII-MCCXCI) (in Latin). Berlin: Libraria Academica Wageriana.
- Schumacher, G. (1888). "Population list of the Liwa of Akka". Quarterly Statement - Palestine Exploration Fund. 20: 169–191. (p. 174, 191)
- Strehlke, E., ed. (1869). Tabulae Ordinis Theutonici ex tabularii regii Berolinensis codice potissimum. Berlin: Weidmanns. (Strehlke, 1869, pp. 57-58, No. 73; cited in Röhricht, 1893, RRH p. 267, No. 1020; cited in Frankel, 1988, p. 255)
