= Ein al-Asad =

Druze village in Israel

Ein al-Asad: עין אל אסד (Hebrew); عين الأسد (Arabic)
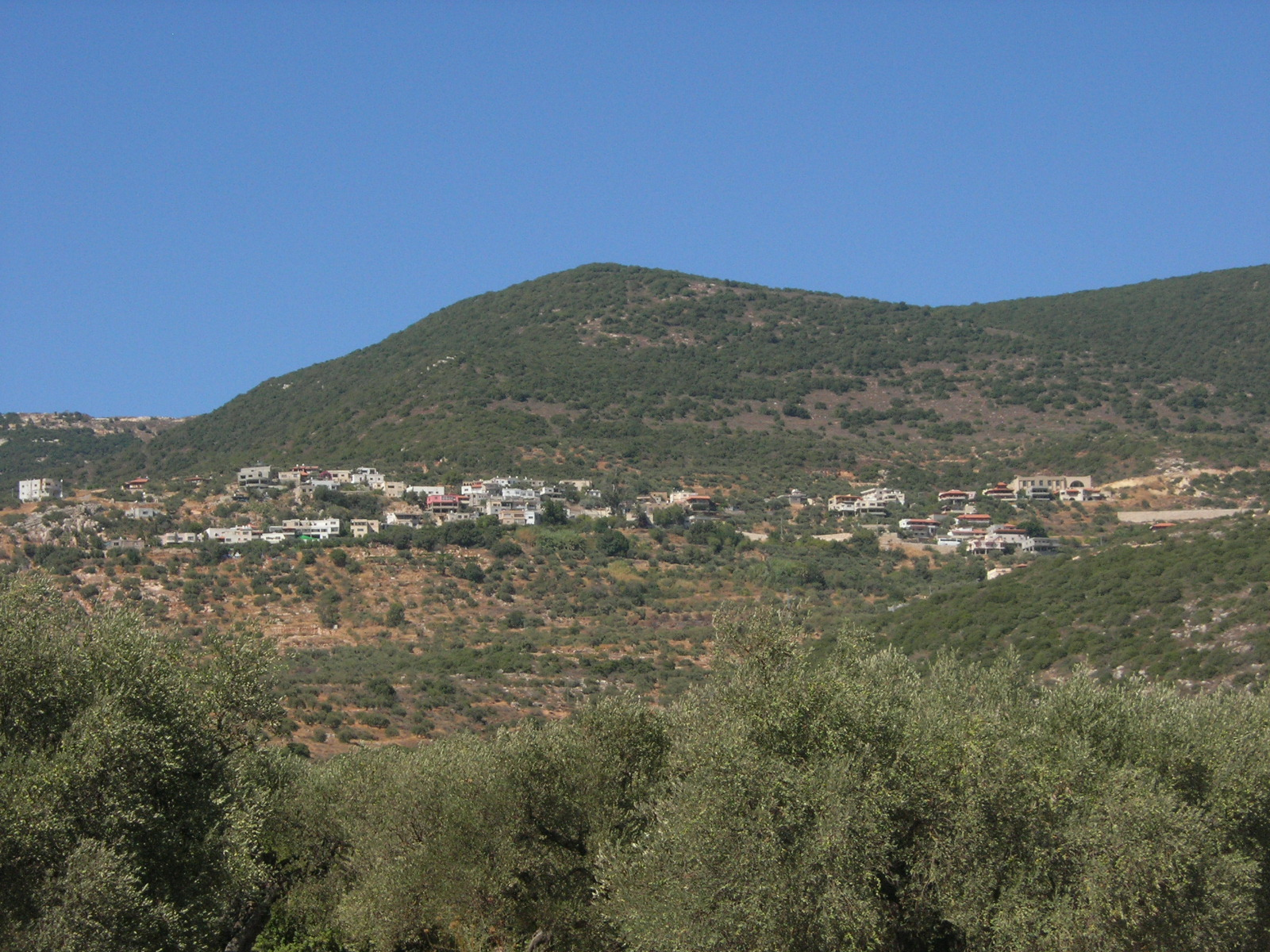

- Location within Northwest Israel Location within Israel
- Coordinates: 32°56′28″N 35°23′47″E
- Country: Israel
- District: Northern
- Subdistrict: Safed
- Council: Merom HaGalil
- Founded: 1899
- Founder: Beit Jann residents
- Population (2024): 955

Ein al-Asad (Arabic: عين الأسد "the lion's spring", Hebrew: עין אל-אסד) is a Druze village in northern Israel. Located near Maghar in the Galilee, it falls under the jurisdiction of Merom HaGalil Regional Council. As of 2024 it had a population of 955.

== History ==
The community was founded in the mid to late 19th century by Druze from nearby Beit Jann, who were later joined by Druze migrants from Lebanon and Jabal al-Druze in Syria. It was named after an eponymous wellspring outside the village.

=== British Mandate ===
In the 1922 census of Palestine conducted by the British Mandate authorities, Ein al-Asad had a population of 48, of whom 47 were Druze and one a Christian, increasing in the 1931 census to 81; 80 Druze and one Christian and a total of 18 houses. In the 1945 statistics, the population of Ein al-Asad together with Beit Jann was 1,640, all classified as "others" (meaning Druze, 120 of which were indicated as being in Ein al-Asad), who owned 43,550 dunams of land according to an official land and population survey. 2,530 dunams were plantations and irrigable land, while 7,406 dunams were used for cereals and 67 dunams were built-up (urban) land.

=== Israel ===
In the 21st century, tourism facilities have developed in the village.

== See also ==
- Druze in Israel

== Bibliography ==
- Barron, J.B., ed. (1923). Palestine: Report and General Abstracts of the Census of 1922. Government of Palestine.
- Falah, Salman (1975). "A History of the Druze Settlements in Palestine during the Ottoman Period". In Maoz, Moshe (ed.). Studies on Palestine during the Ottoman Period. Jerusalem: Magnes Press. Archived from the original on 2023-03-31.
- Government of Palestine, Department of Statistics (1945). Village Statistics, April, 1945. Archived from the original on 2019-04-02.
- Hadawi, S. (1970). Village Statistics of 1945: A Classification of Land and Area ownership in Palestine. Palestine Liberation Organization Research Center. Archived from the original on 2018-12-08.
- Mills, E., ed. (1932). Census of Palestine 1931. Population of Villages, Towns and Administrative Areas (PDF). Jerusalem: Government of Palestine.
- Palmer, E. H. (1881). The Survey of Western Palestine: Arabic and English Name Lists Collected During the Survey by Lieutenants Conder and Kitchener, R. E. Transliterated and Explained by E.H. Palmer. Committee of the Palestine Exploration Fund.
