= Ahuzat Naftali =

Former and planned settlement in Israel

Ahuzat Naftali אֲחֻזַּת נַפְתָּלִי
- Former moshav / Planned Druze town
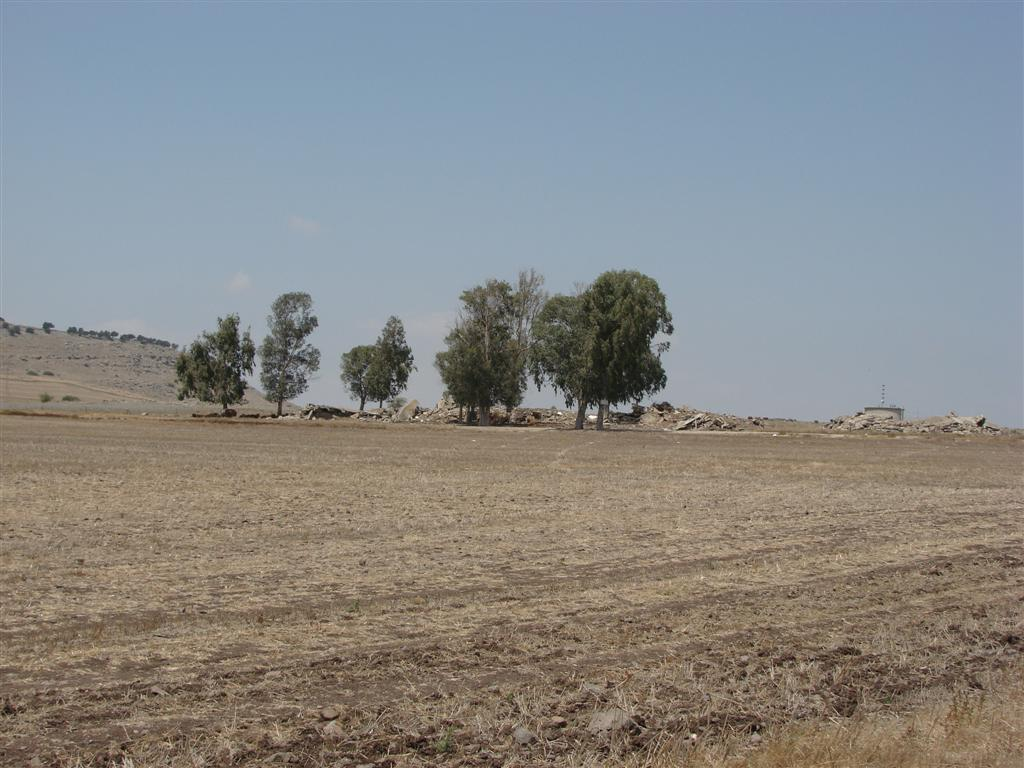
- Site of Ahuzat Naftali
- Etymology: Named after the biblical Tribe of Naphtali
- Interactive map of Ahuzat Naftali
- Location in Israel Ahuzat Naftali (Israel)
- Coordinates: 32.7955°N 35.4702°E
- Country: Israel
- District: Northern District
- Regional council: Lower Galilee Regional Council
- Founded: 1949
- Founded by: Poalei Agudat Yisrael

Population
  - Total: 0 (former settlement)
- Planned Druze town: up to 10,000
- Time zone: UTC+2 (IST)
  - Summer (DST): UTC+3 (IDT)

Ahuzat Naftali (Hebrew: אֲחֻזַּת נַפְתָּלִי, lit. Estate Naftali) is a site in the Galilee region not far from Tiberias, near kibbutz Lavi and south of Karnei Hittin. Ahuzat Naftali was established as a moshav under the jurisdiction of the Lower Galilee Regional Council in 1949.

== History ==
Ahuzat Naftali was named after the biblical tribe of Naftali, which had been allotted this region according to the Book of Joshua (19:33). The settlement was founded by Poalei Agudat Yisrael on the land Yosef Levy Hagiz purchased in the 1920s. While it was planned for 200 estates, only several families lived there. Initially it was named "Eretz Naftali" ("land of Naftali"), according to the biblical reference, but renamed several years later because Ben Gurion, who visited the area didn't like the hint that there is "a state within the state" (Eretz Naftali within Eretz Israel).

Already small, it became gradually abandoned and in 1957 only one family lived there. In late 1950s the moshav was abandoned completely and became the campus of an educational institute for immigrant children. The school closed at the end of the 1970s.

In 1980s the buildings were demolished by IDF to prevent squatting by Bedouins.

== Planned Druze town ==
In 2012, it was announced that a new Druze town would be built in the area of the settlement. In 2016, the plan was approved by the government of Israel. The planned community seeks to relieve the housing crisis among the Druze in Israel.

In the first stage, it will consist of 400 housing units, eventually catering to a population of 10,000. Ahuzat Naftali will be the first Druze town built by Israel.

In early 2000s there was a different plan to build a town on the site, but it was cancelled "because it was essentially another neighborhood of Tiberias".
