= Yanuh-Jat =

Yanuh–Jat: יַאנוּח–גַ׳ת; يانوح-جت
- Local council (from 1990)

Hebrew transcription(s)
  - ISO 259: Yanuaḥ–Ǧatt
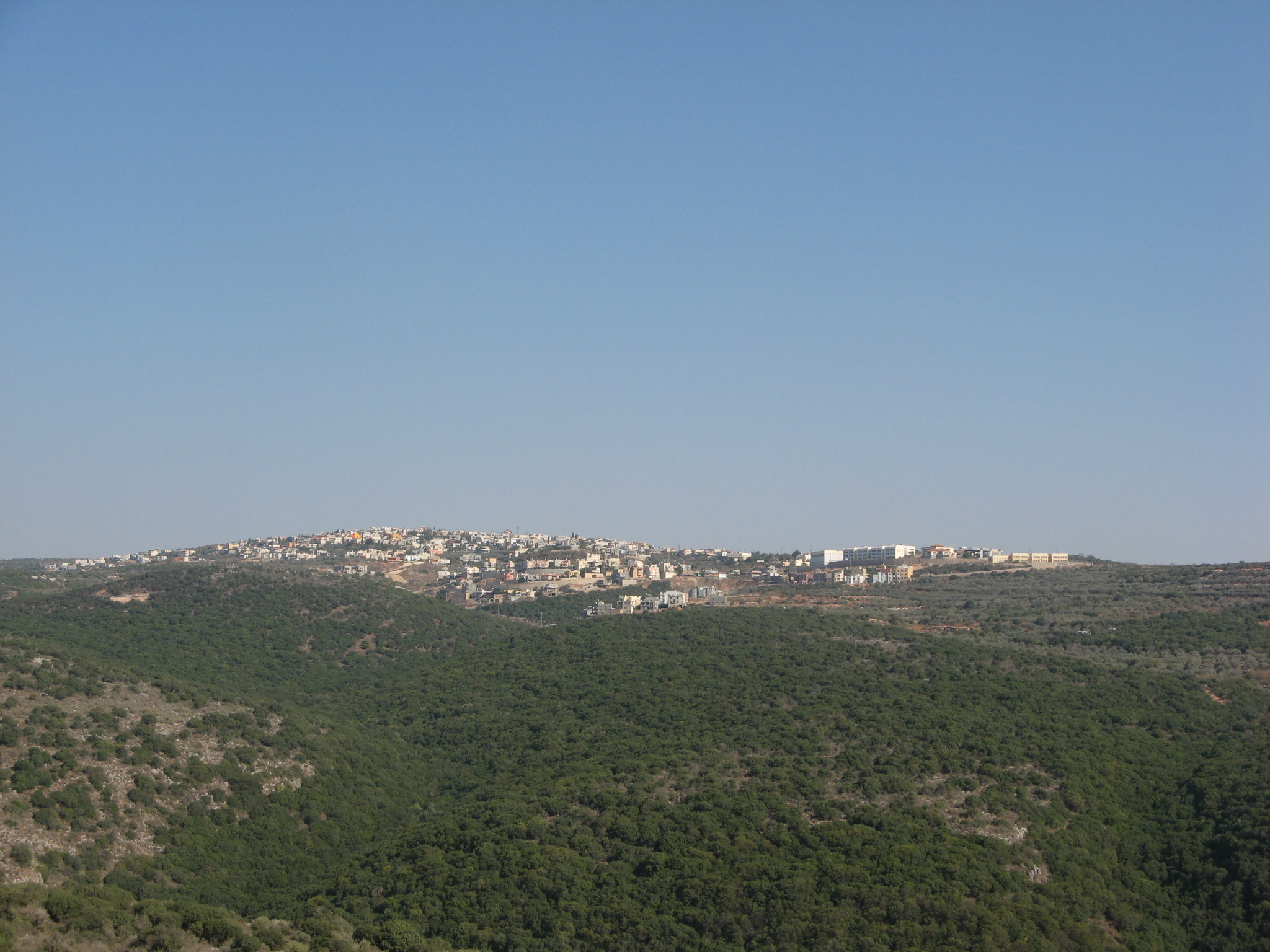

- Location within Northwest Israel Location within Israel
- Coordinates: 32°58′58″N 35°14′39″E
- Grid position: 173/265 PAL
- Country: Israel
- District: Northern
- Subdistrict: Acre
- Natural Region: Yehi'am

Area
  - Total: 13,400 dunams (13.4 km^{2}; 5.2 sq mi)

Population (2024)
  - Total: 6,890
  - Density: 514/km^{2} (1,330/sq mi)
- Name meaning: Yanuh, possibly from Yanoh Jett, possibly "elevated ground"

Yanuh–Jat (Arabic: يانوح-جت, romanized: Yānūḥ-Jat, Hebrew: יַאנוּח–גַ׳ת) is an Israeli Druze village and local council in the Northern District of Israel, northeast of Acre, consisting of the villages of Yanuh and Jat, which merged in 1990. In 2024 it had a population of 6,890, all members of the Druze community.

== History ==
In Yanuh, old hewn stones have been found reused in village houses. Lintels, oil press, grape press, cisterns cut in rock and old graves have also been described.

Remains from the Bronze Ages, the Iron Age, the Hellenistic, Roman and the Byzantine periods were found when an area near the shrine of Shaykh Abu Arus in Jat was excavated. 4th and 5th century CE glass vases were found in Jat when a burial cave was excavated in 1966. Ceramics from the same period was also found, together with a bronze bell in an excavation in 1967 of a grave with a central chamber and loculi.

The name Jatt, or Jathth (northwestern Semitic: "vinepress"), is an ancient one.

In the Crusader era, Jatt was known under the name of Jesce, Jeth or Gez. It first belonged to the lord who had a seat at Mi'ilya, ("Castellum Regis"), later it belonged to the Teutonic Knights. In 1220 Joscelin III´s daughter Beatrix de Courtenay and her husband Otto von Botenlauben, Count of Henneberg, sold their land, including Gez, to the Teutonic Knights.

Earlier sources identified the Crusader place of Lanahie with Yanuh, however, newer researchers place Lanahie near Umm al-Faraj.

=== Ottoman era ===
In 1517, the area was incorporated into the Ottoman Empire with the rest of Palestine, and in 1596 Yanuh appeared in the Ottoman tax registers under the name of "Yanuh al-Ward" as being in the nahiya (subdistrict) of Akka under the Liwa of Safad, with a population of 16 households and 2 bachelors, all Muslim. It paid taxes on a number of crops, including wheat and barley, fruit trees, as well as on goats, beehives and "winter pastures".

French explorer Victor Guérin visited Yanuh in August 1875, and found Cisterns cut in the rock, and many cut stones scattered over the soil, surrounding platforms or employed as building material, show that we are here on the site of a small ancient city, the name of which is faithfully preserved in its modern name.' At the same time he noted about "Djett" that 'this is the site of an ancient township, of which there remain cisterns, a built reservoir, and fragments of cut stones disposed about platforms or built up in the walls of modern constructions. Its ancient name was probably Gath, Gith, or Gittah, given to many towns in Palestine, of which Jett is the modern form.'

In the 1881 PEF's Survey of Western Palestine (SWP), Yanuh was described as a village "built of stone, in two parts, having the tomb of a Neby in the southern portion; the village is partially in ruins, and contains about 170 Druzes; it is situated on the high ground on the western brow of a ridge, and is surrounded by olives and a little arable land, but mostly brushwood; there are two birkets and cisterns to supply water." SWP at the same time described "Jett" as "a village, built of stone, on the ridge of a hill; contains about 120 Druzes (according to Guerin, 150); surrounded by olives and figs; the water from cisterns and wells."

A population list from about 1887 showed that Yanuh had 245 inhabitants and Jett had about 105 inhabitants; all Druze.

=== British Mandate of Palestine ===
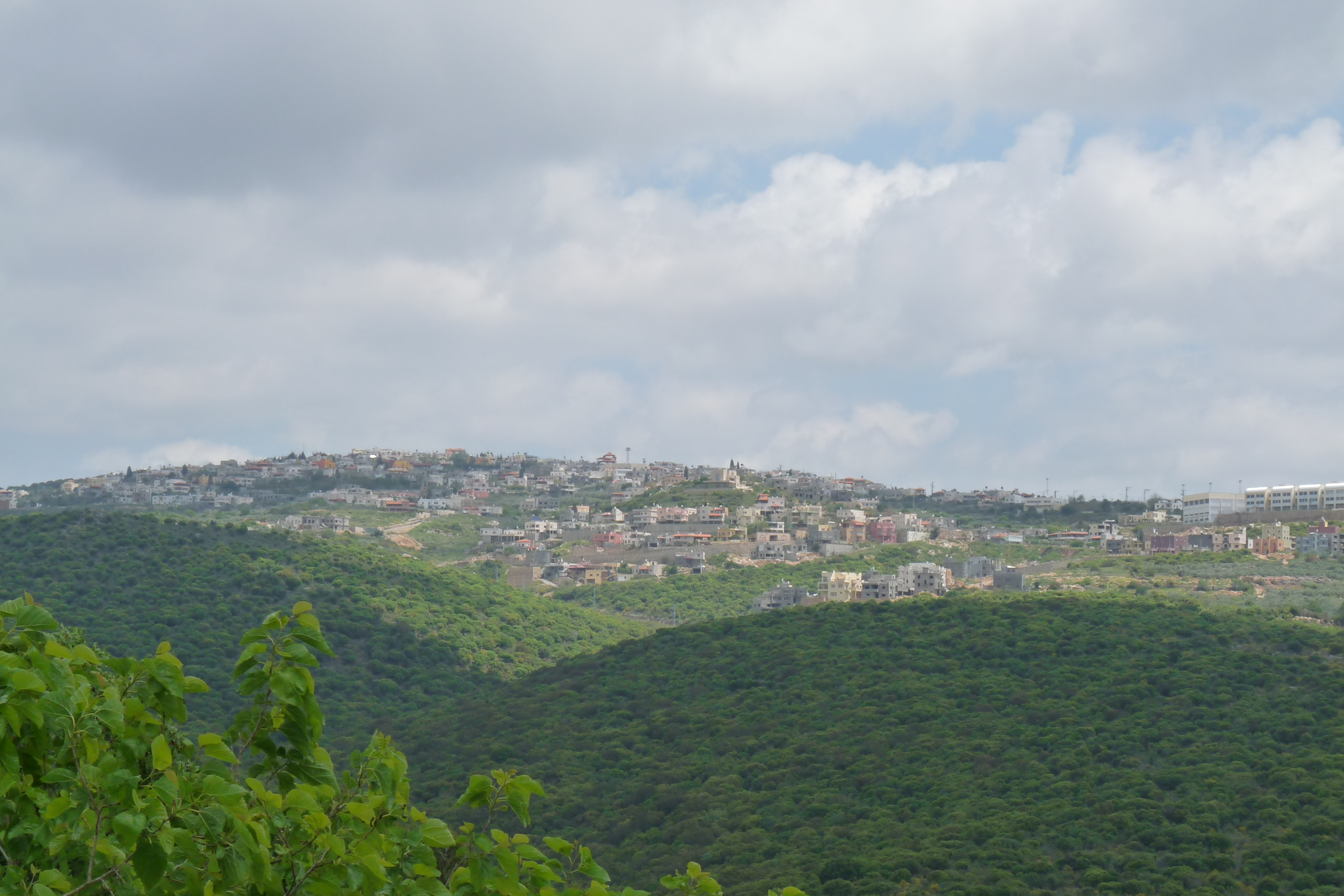
View of Yanuh-Jat

In the 1922 census of Palestine conducted by the British Mandate authorities, Yanuh had a population of 117 Druze and one Muslim, while Jat had a population of 137, all Druze. By the time of the 1931 census, Yanuh had a population of 306, all Druze, in 47 houses, while Jat had a population of 154 in 28 houses, of which eight were Muslims and the rest Druze.

In 1945 Yanuh had a population of 410, all classified as "others", i.e. Druze, with 12,836 dunams of land, according to an official land and population survey. Of this, 804 dunams were plantations and irrigable land, 1,625 used for cereals, while 40 dunams were built-up land. In the same 1945 survey Jat had a population of 200 Arabs; 10 Muslims and 190 "others", i.e. Druze, and 5,909 dunams of land. Of this, 554 dunams were plantations and irrigable land, 1,206 used for cereals, while 29 dunams were built-up land.

=== State of Israel ===
According to the United Nations Partition Plan for Palestine, Yanuh-Jat was to be a part of the proposed Arab state. In August 1948, during the 1948 Arab–Israeli War, a number of Druze villages in the western Galilee were within the Israeli military sphere of control. Yanuh and Jat were among several Druze villages located in the military zone of Arab Liberation Army (ALA) of Fawzi al-Qawuqji. Yanuh was the only village to host the ALA and in September more ALA fighters were sent to the village as reinforcements to buttress the defense of Tarshiha where the ALA had a headquarters. On 29 October Israeli forces launched Operation Hiram, an offensive resulting in the capture of much of the central Galilee and some villages in southern Lebanon. During the operation, armed residents from Yanuh and Jat put up resistance to the IDF Sword Battalion, ending with the deaths of 17 Israeli soldiers, 14 of whom were Druze. The Israeli unit had not expected a confrontation with the two villages because representatives from Yanuh had previously made a secret pact with the Israeli authorities not to resist. The families of the slain Druze soldiers were given compensation by the residents of Yanuh and Jat, although the two villages later experienced neglect from the government when Israel established control over the area since they were perceived as having betrayed the state. None were expelled, however.

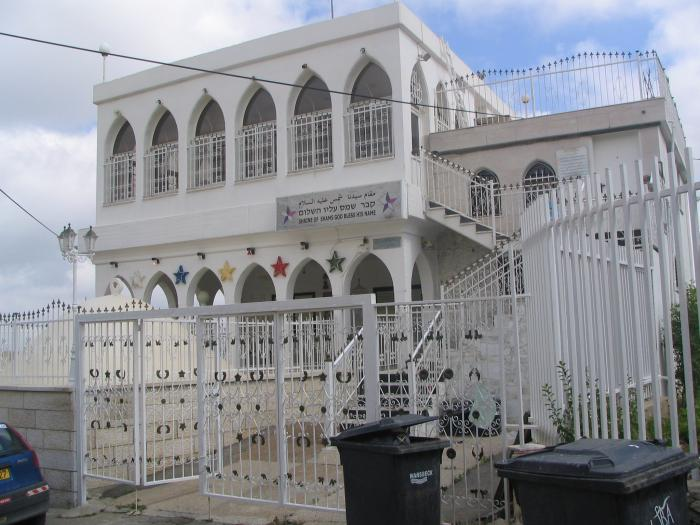
Maqām of Sheik Shams, in Yanuh

Yanuh-Jat gained local council status in 1990. According to the Israel Central Bureau of Statistics (CBS), it had a population of 5,300 in 2006 and 6,500 in 2019. All of the town's inhabitants are Druze. Before a municipal merger in 1990, Yanuh and Jat were separate villages. In 2003 an economic emergency plan was introduced in which Yanuh-Jat was merged with the neighboring villages: Julis, Abu Snan and Yarka. In the wake of objections by the local population, the merger was cancelled.

During the Gaza war, two IDF Druze officers and both natives of Yanuh-Jat, Salman Habaka and Alim Abdallah, were killed in clashes.

== Shrines ==
Yanuh contains the maqām ("saintly-person tomb") of a certain Nabi Shamsa ("Prophet Shams"), while Jatt contains the maqām of a certain Shaykh Abu Arus. Both serve as Druze visitation sites of minor importance and not much known the shrines' histories or the people associated with them, according to Nissim Dana, an author specializing in Druze affairs. However, Dana writes that Shaykh Abu Arus was among the first missionaries to spread the Druze religion.

== Voting Patterns ==
In the 2026 election, 84 percent of voters in Yanuh-Jat voted for the parties of the center-left coalition led by Gadi Eisenkot, while 13 percent voted for the parties of the right-wing coalition led by Benjamin Netanyahu and 1 percent voted for the Arab parties. An additional 0.8 percent voted for the Reservists, and 0.3 percent voted for Amcha Yisrael. Voter turnout increased 50 percent from the 2022 election.

== See also ==
- Arab localities in Israel
- Druze in Israel

== Bibliography ==
- Abu Hamid, Amani (2012-12-31). "Tell Jatt Final Report". Hadashot Arkheologiyot – Excavations and Surveys in Israel (124).
- Barron, J. B., ed. (1923). Palestine: Report and General Abstracts of the Census of 1922. Government of Palestine.
- Conder, C. R.; Kitchener, H. H. (1881). The Survey of Western Palestine: Memoirs of the Topography, Orography, Hydrography, and Archaeology. Vol. 1. London: Committee of the Palestine Exploration Fund.
- Cinamon, Gilad (2011-07-21). "Jatt Final Report". Hadashot Arkheologiyot – Excavations and Surveys in Israel (123).
- Dana, Nissim (2003). The Druze in the Middle East: Their Faith, Leadership, Identity and Status. Sussex Academic Press. ISBN 1903900360.
- Dauphin, C. (1998). La Palestine byzantine, Peuplement et Populations. BAR International Series 726 (in French). Vol. III : Catalogue. Oxford: Archeopress. ISBN 0-860549-05-4.
- Department of Statistics (1945). Village Statistics, April, 1945. Government of Palestine.
- Ellenblum, R. (2003). Frankish Rural Settlement in the Latin Kingdom of Jerusalem. Cambridge University Press. ISBN 9780521521871.
- Firro, Kais (1999). The Druzes in the Jewish State: A Brief History. BRILL. ISBN 9004112510.
- Frankel, Rafael (1988). "Topographical notes on the territory of Acre in the Crusader period". Israel Exploration Journal. 38 (4): 249–272.
- Guérin, V. (1880). Description Géographique Historique et Archéologique de la Palestine (in French). Vol. 3: Galilee, pt. 2. Paris: L'Imprimerie Nationale.
- Hadawi, S. (1970). Village Statistics of 1945: A Classification of Land and Area ownership in Palestine. Palestine Liberation Organization Research Center.
- Hütteroth, W.-D.; Abdulfattah, K. (1977). Historical Geography of Palestine, Transjordan and Southern Syria in the Late 16th Century. Erlanger Geographische Arbeiten, Sonderband 5. Erlangen, Germany: Vorstand der Fränkischen Geographischen Gesellschaft. ISBN 3-920405-41-2.
- Lerer, Yoav (2011-05-25). "Jatt, Survey Final Report". Hadashot Arkheologiyot – Excavations and Surveys in Israel (123).
- Mills, E., ed. (1932). Census of Palestine 1931. Population of Villages, Towns and Administrative Areas. Jerusalem: Government of Palestine.
- Palmer, E. H. (1881). The Survey of Western Palestine: Arabic and English Name Lists Collected During the Survey by Lieutenants Conder and Kitchener, R. E. Transliterated and Explained by E.H. Palmer. Committee of the Palestine Exploration Fund.
- Parsons, Laila (2001). E. Rogan (ed.). The War for Palestine: Rewriting the History of 1948. Cambridge University Press. ISBN 0521794765.
- Rey, E. G. (1883). Les colonies franques de Syrie aux XIIme et XIIIme siècles (in French). Paris: A. Picard.
- Rhode, H. (1979). Administration and Population of the Sancak of Safed in the Sixteenth Century. Columbia University. Archived from the original on 2020-03-01.
- Röhricht, R. (1893). (RRH) Regesta regni Hierosolymitani (MXCVII-MCCXCI) (in Latin). Berlin: Libraria Academica Wageriana.
- Schumacher, G. (1888). "Population list of the Liwa of Akka". Quarterly Statement - Palestine Exploration Fund. 20: 169–191.
- Strehlke, E., ed. (1869). Tabulae Ordinis Theutonici ex tabularii regii Berolinensis codice potissimum. Berlin: Weidmanns.
- Swayd, Sami (2009). The A to Z of the Druzes. Rowman & Littlefield. ISBN 978-0810868366.
