= Bayt Jann =

Druze village in Israel

Bayt Jann: בית ג'ן; بيت جن
- Local council

Hebrew transcription(s)
  - ISO 259: Beit Ǧann
  - Also spelled: Beit Jann or Bayt Jann (unofficial)
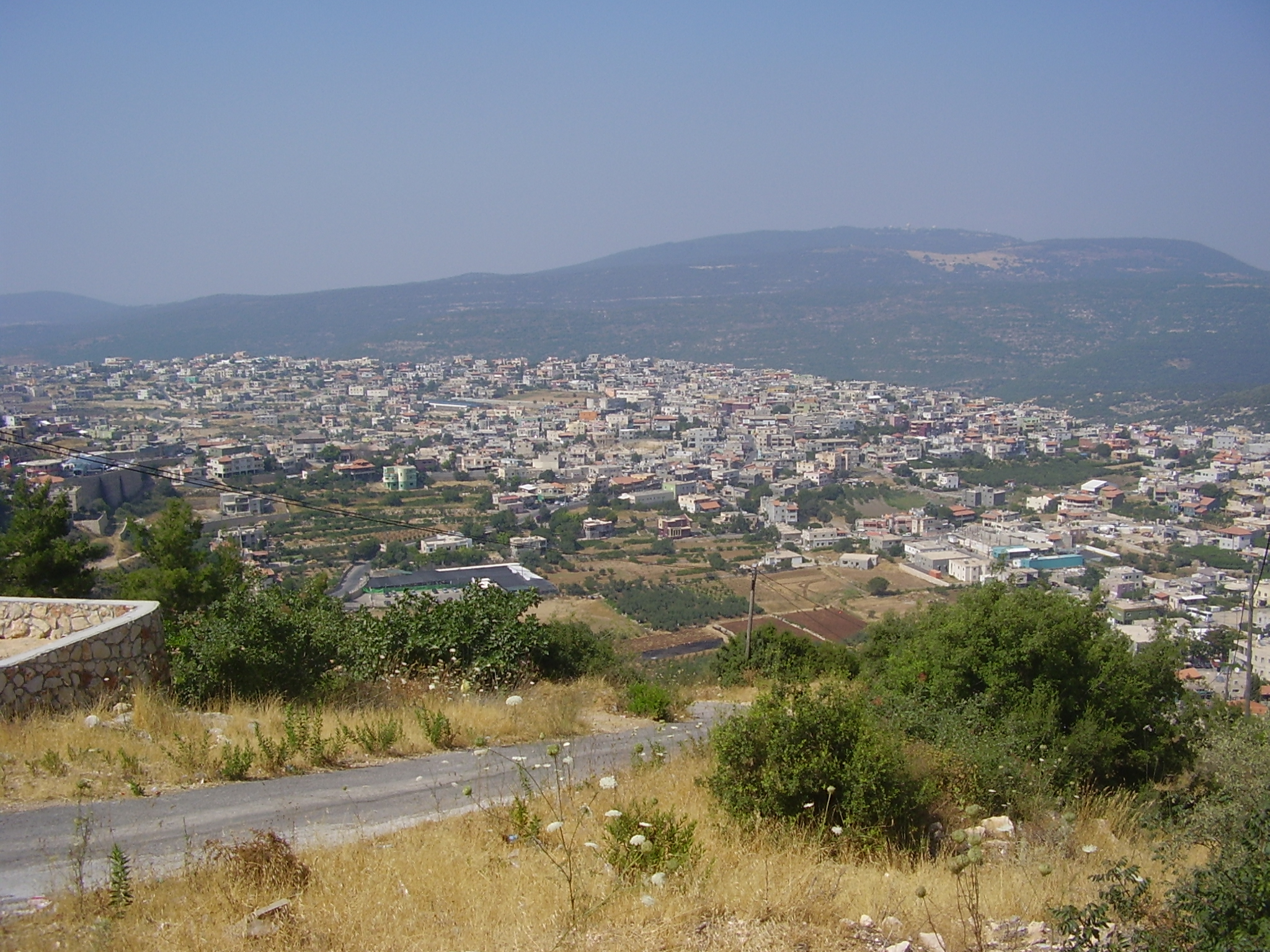
- Beit Jann cityscape

- Location within Northwest Israel Location within Israel
- Coordinates: 32°57′55″N 35°22′46″E
- Grid position: 185/263 PAL
- Country: Israel
- District: Northern
- Subdistrict: Acre
- Natural Region: Yehi'am
- Founded: 13th or 14th century (as Druze settlement)

Government
  - Mayor: Nazih Dabbur

Area
  - Total: 4,650 dunams (4.65 km^{2}; 1.80 sq mi)

Population (2024)
  - Total: 12,446
  - Density: 2,680/km^{2} (6,930/sq mi)
- Name meaning: "The house of the genie", or "The garden house"

Bayt Jann (Arabic: بيت جن; Hebrew: בית ג'ן) is a Druze village on Mount Meron in northern Israel. At 940 meters above sea level, Bayt Jann is one of the highest inhabited locations in the country. In 2024 it had a population of 12,446.

Bayt Jann has a cool climate, even in summer, and offers panoramic views that stretch as far as the Sea of Galilee and the Mediterranean on a clear day. Several families in the village run bed and breakfast facilities. The village is located inside the Mount Meron nature reserve.

== Etymology ==
Guérin noted that the village was known as Beitegene or Bette-Gen during the Middle Ages. He suggested that the name in antiquity was Hebrew: בֵּית גַּנִּים, romanized: Beth-Gannim, "House of Gardens. The village was surrounded by orchards, and vineyards and ancient terraces were visible nearby.

== History ==
=== Antiquity ===
Bayt Jann is thought to have been one of several locations called Beth Dagon, and may be identified with the Beth Dagon mentioned in Tosefta Shevi'ith 7:13-71,29.

=== Crusaders and Caliphates ===
In the Crusader era it was known as Beitegen. In 1249, John Aleman transferred land, including the casalia of Beitegen, Sajur, Majd al-Krum and Nahf to the Teutonic Knights.

According to local legend, Druze families in the area lived in scattered colonies in the hills near sources of water until the 13th or 14th century. Two hunters looking for hyraxes stumbled upon a cave where they found an ancient cistern filled with water. Concluding that this was a good place for permanent settlement, several families settled on the site of what would become Bayt Jann.

=== Ottoman Empire ===
In 1517, the village was incorporated into the Ottoman Empire with the rest of Palestine, and in 1596, Bayt Jinn appeared in Ottoman tax registers as being in nahiya (subdistrict) of Akka under the liwa' (district) of Safad. It had a population of 102 households and 5 bachelors, all Muslims. They paid taxes on silk spinning (dulab harir), occasional revenues, goats and/or beehives, olive oil press and/or a press for grape syrup.

In August 1754, the missionary Stephan Schulz visited the village. He noted that the inhabitants produced water-skins, and described the grapes of the region as particularly large and fine.

The American biblical scholar Edward Robinson described Bayt Jann in 1852 as a "large well-built village", with houses made of limestone and 260 male residents, all Druze. In 1875, the French explorer Victor Guérin visited the village, which he called Beit Djenn. He estimated it had two hundred inhabitants, all Druze. He further noted that "A few years ago it was much larger, as is indicated by the abandoned houses which are beginning to fall into ruins. I am told that their occupants have fled to the Hauran to escape conscription. (...) The flanks of the hill on which the village stands are covered with vines which creep along the ground; their grapes [are] of a prodigious size..." In 1881, the Palestine Exploration Fund's Survey of Western Palestine described Beit Jenn as a good village built of stone, with 300 Muslims and 100 Druze, with extensive gardens and vineyards.Old stones have been reused in village homes, and cisterns and tombs carved into rock have also been found.

A population list from about 1887 showed Bayt Jann to have about 1,215 inhabitants; all Druze.

=== British Mandate ===
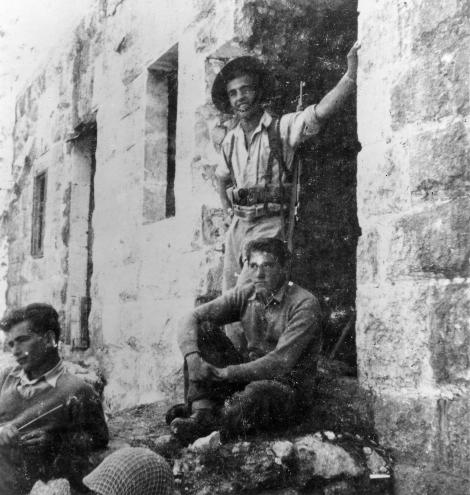
Yiftach Brigade "D" Company Headquarters in Bayt Jann. 1948

In the 1922 census of Palestine conducted by the British Mandate authorities, Bait Jan had a population of 902: 6 Muslims, 1 Christian and 895 Druze; the only Christian was an Anglican. At the time of the 1931 census, Bayt Jann had 229 occupied houses and a population of 1100 Druze and 1 Muslim.

In the 1945 statistics the population of Bayt Jann together with Ein al-Asad was 1,640, all classified as "others" (i.e., Druze), who owned 43,550 dunams of land according to an official land and population survey. 2,530 dunams were plantations and irrigable land, 7,406 used for cereals, while 67 dunams were built-up (urban) land.

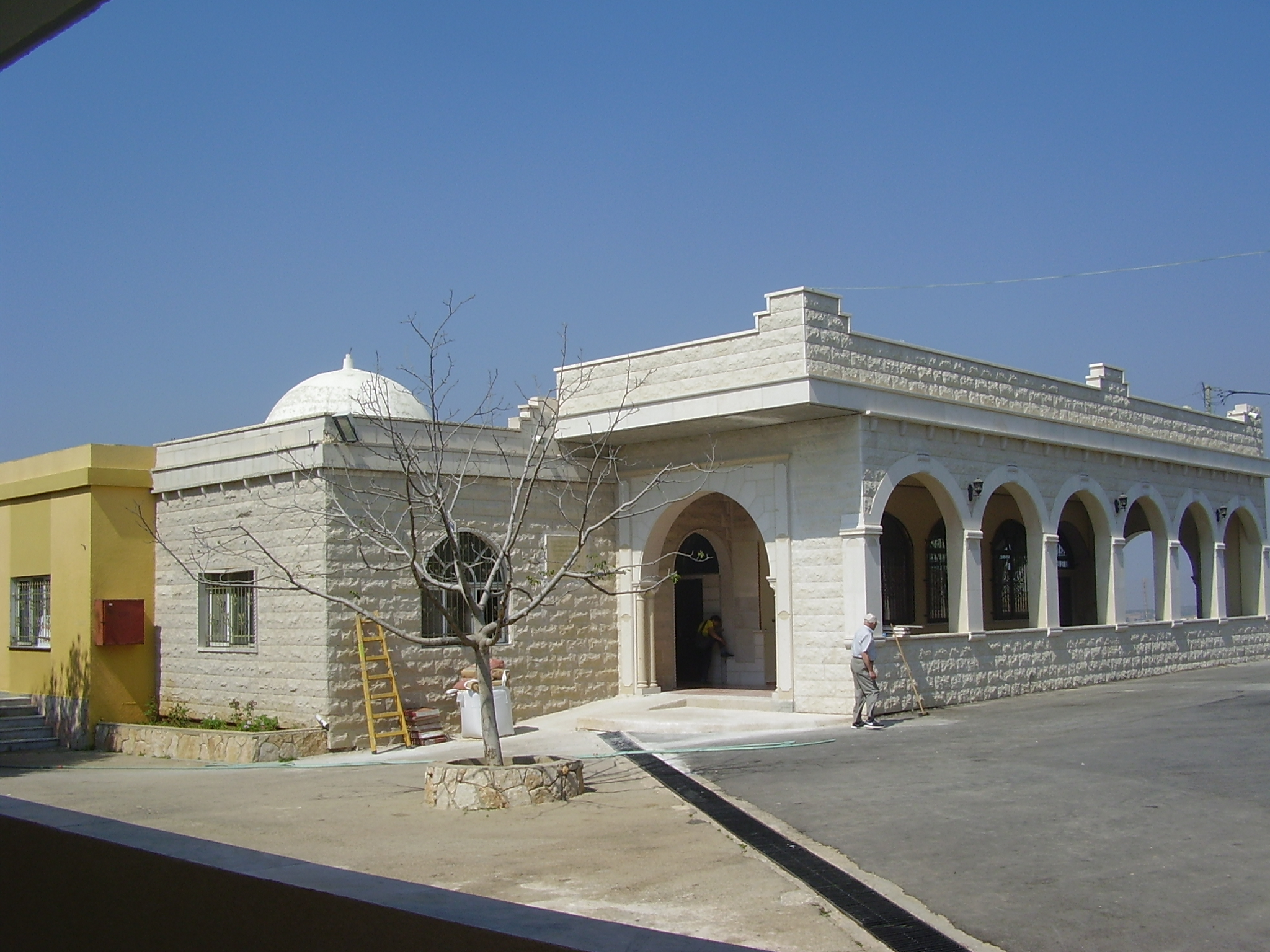
Shrine of Baha al-Din, probably dedicated to the founding Druze leader of this name

=== Israel ===
In September 1991, the body of Samir Assad, an Israel Defense Forces soldier from Bayt Jann, held since 1983 by the DFLP, was returned in exchange for the return to Israel of exiled members of the DFLP.

In July 2006, during the Hezbollah–Israel war, Bayt Jann was hit by Katyusha rockets fired by Hezbollah. In the aftermath of the 2021 Meron crowd crush, the village offered help to the survivors and offered emergency services if ever needed. Mayor Radi Najm said that several families had sheltered survivors of the disaster. Illegal logging in the vicinity of Bayt Jann has led to conflicts with park officials and rangers.

In 2013, Bayt Jann high school was ranked first in the country for the number of students graduating with a bagrut matriculation certificate. The village had no playground until 2020, when one was built with the help of JNF UK.

== Demographics ==
Historical population
Year	Pop.	±%
1972	3,700	—
1983	5,800	+56.8%
1995	7,900	+36.2%
2008	10,400	+31.6%
2022	12,038	+15.7%
2024	12,446	+3.4%

In 2022, 99.9% of the population was Druze and 0.1% was Muslim.

As of November 2023, Bayt Jann has the highest percentage of IDF soldiers fallen in battle of any community in Israel, with a total of 64.

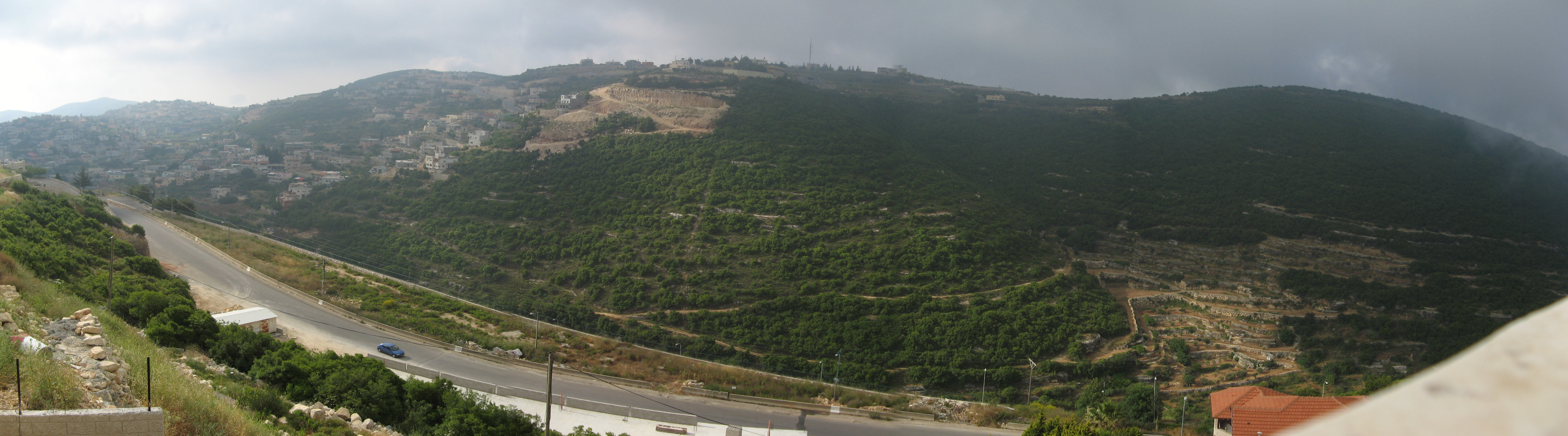
Panorama of the outskirts of Bayt Jann

== Voting Patterns ==
In the 2022 election, 89 percent of voters in Bayt Jann voted for the parties of the center-left coalition led by Yair Lapid, while 6 percent voted for the parties of the right-wing coalition led by Benjamin Netanyahu and 3 percent voted for the Arab parties.

In the 2026 election, 74 percent of voters in Bayt Jann voted for the parties of the center-left coalition led by Gadi Eisenkot, while 20 percent voted for the parties of the right-wing coalition led by Benjamin Netanyahu and 4 percent voted for the Arab parties. An additional 0.9 percent voted for the Reservists, and 0.6 percent voted for Amcha Yisrael. Voter turnout increased 10 percent from the 2022 election.

== See also ==
- Arab localities in Israel
- Druze in Israel

== Bibliography ==
- Barron, J.B., ed. (1923). Palestine: Report and General Abstracts of the Census of 1922. Government of Palestine.
- Conder, C.R.; Kitchener, H.H. (1881). The Survey of Western Palestine: Memoirs of the Topography, Orography, Hydrography, and Archaeology. Vol. 1. London: Committee of the Palestine Exploration Fund.
- Dauphin, C. (1998). La Palestine byzantine, Peuplement et Populations. BAR International Series 726 (in French). Vol. III : Catalogue. Oxford: Archeopress. ISBN 0-860549-05-4.
- Department of Statistics (1945). Village Statistics, April, 1945. Government of Palestine.
- Frankel, Rafael (1988). "Topographical notes on the territory of Acre in the Crusader period". Israel Exploration Journal. 38 (4): 249–272.
- Guérin, V. (1880). Description Géographique Historique et Archéologique de la Palestine (in French). Vol. 3: Galilee, pt. 2. Paris: L'Imprimerie Nationale.
- Hadawi, S. (1970). Village Statistics of 1945: A Classification of Land and Area ownership in Palestine. Palestine Liberation Organization Research Center.
- Hütteroth, W.-D.; Abdulfattah, K. (1977). Historical Geography of Palestine, Transjordan and Southern Syria in the Late 16th Century. Erlanger Geographische Arbeiten, Sonderband 5. Erlangen, Germany: Vorstand der Fränkischen Geographischen Gesellschaft. ISBN 3-920405-41-2.
- Mills, E., ed. (1932). Census of Palestine 1931. Population of Villages, Towns and Administrative Areas. Jerusalem: Government of Palestine.
- Palmer, E.H. (1881). The Survey of Western Palestine: Arabic and English Name Lists Collected During the Survey by Lieutenants Conder and Kitchener, R. E. Transliterated and Explained by E.H. Palmer. Committee of the Palestine Exploration Fund.
- Paulus, H.E.G. (ed) (1803). Sammlung der merkwu̇rdigsten Reisen in den Orient: In Uebersezungen und Auszu̇gen mit ausgewälten kupfern und charten, auch mit den nöthigen einleitungen anmerkungen und kollectiven registern. Vol. 7. Jena: C. H. Cuno's erben.
- Robinson, E.; Smith, E. (1841). Biblical Researches in Palestine, Mount Sinai and Arabia Petraea: A Journal of Travels in the year 1838. Vol. 3. Boston: Crocker & Brewster.
- Robinson, E.; Smith, E (1856). Later Biblical Researches in Palestine and adjacent regions: A Journal of Travels in the year 1852. London: John Murray.
- Rhode, H. (1979). Administration and Population of the Sancak of Safed in the Sixteenth Century. Columbia University. Archived from the original on 2020-03-01.
- Röhricht, R. (1893). (RRH) Regesta regni Hierosolymitani (MXCVII-MCCXCI) (in Latin). Berlin: Libraria Academica Wageriana.
- Schumacher, G. (1888). "Population list of the Liwa of Akka". Quarterly Statement - Palestine Exploration Fund. 20: 169–191.
- Strehlke, E., ed. (1869). Tabulae Ordinis Theutonici ex tabularii regii Berolinensis codice potissimum. Berlin: Weidmanns.
