= Alim Abdallah =

Israeli Druze lieutenant colonel (1982/1983–2023)

- עלים עבדאללה
- Born: 1982; Yanuh-Jat, Israel
- Died: 9 October 2023 (aged 41); Adamit, Israel
- Spouse: married
- Children: 3
- Military career
- Allegiance: Israel
- Branch: Israel Defense Forces
- Service years: 2002–2023
- Rank: Lieutenant colonel
- Commands: Deputy Commander of the 300th Brigade
- Conflicts: Gaza war: October 2023 Hezbollah strike †

Alim Abdallah (Hebrew: עלים עבדאללה; Arabic: عليم عبدالله; 1982 – 9 October 2023) was the deputy commander of the Israeli 300th Brigade of the 91st Division. Abdallah, a Druze Israeli, was killed by a Hezbollah strike while responding to an infiltration operation during the Gaza war. His rank was lieutenant colonel.

== Career ==
Abdallah enlisted in the IDF in 2002, in the 299th Battalion. During the 2006 Lebanon War, he was the deputy commander of a company. After that, Abdallah was the battalion's commanding officer. After completing his studies, he was appointed deputy commander of the 33rd Battalion in Karakal.

Abdallah later served as a paramilitary officer of the Paran Brigade, commander of the 299th Reserve Battalion, and head of the training branch of the Northern Command. In the 300th Brigade, he held several senior positions, such as a brigade operations officer, a brigade safety officer, and the brigade's deputy commander.

On 9 October 2023, Abdallah was killed in the Western Galilee during an exchange of fire with militants who infiltrated from Lebanon. He was killed one week prior to completing his military service.

== Family ==
Abdallah was married to Muna. They had three children. The brother of Abdallah was an officer in the same unit and heard over the internal communication that his brother was hit.
