= Labib Hussein Abu Rokan =

Druze Israeli politician 1911-1989

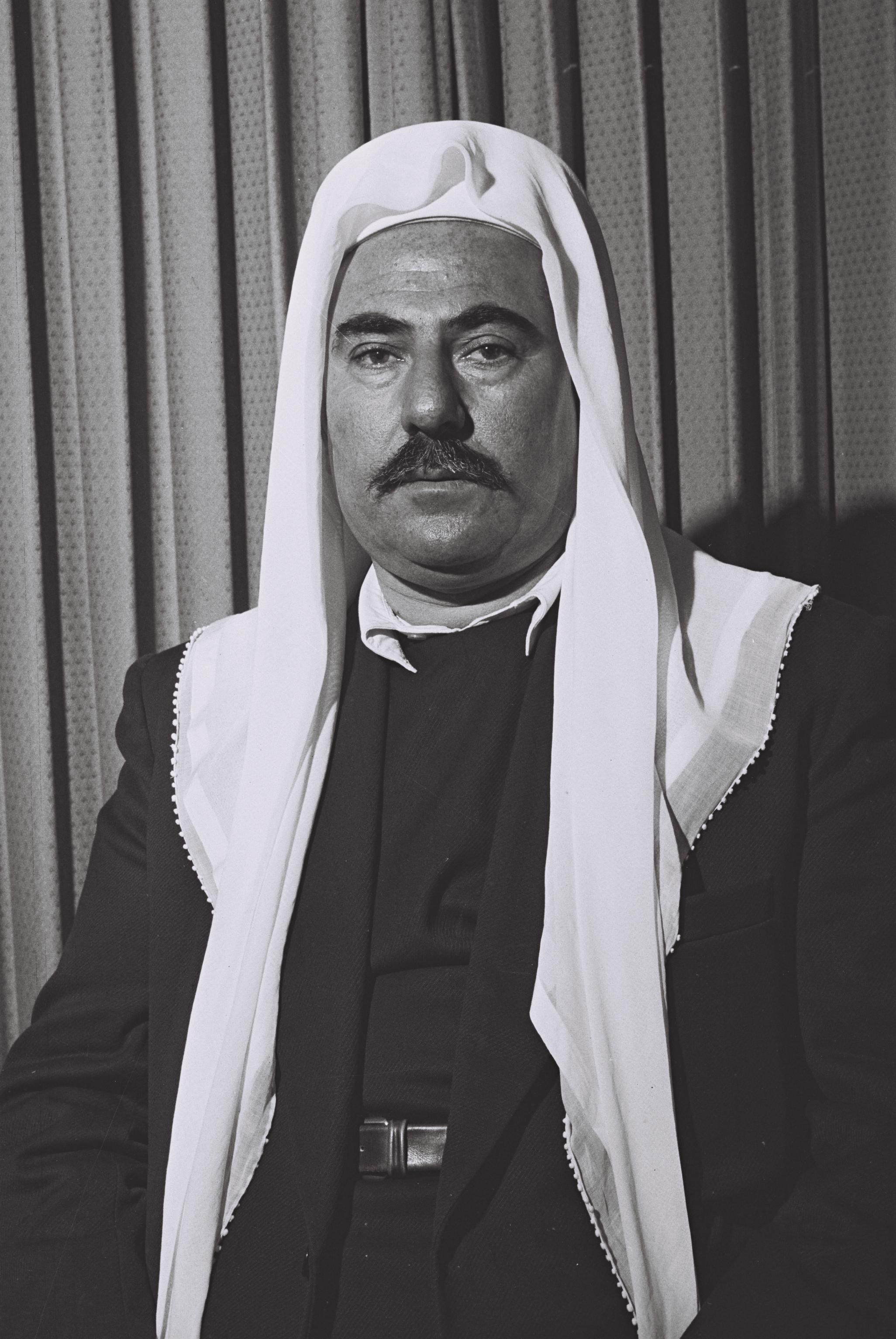
- Abu Rokan in 1959

Faction represented in the Knesset
- 1959–1961: Cooperation and Brotherhood

Personal details
- Born: 1911 Isfiya, Ottoman Empire
- Died: 20 November 1989 (aged 77–78)

Labib Hussein Abu Rokan (Arabic: لبيب حسين أبو ركن, Hebrew: לביב חוסיין אבו-רוכן; 1911 – 20 November 1989) was a Druze Israeli politician who served as a member of the Knesset for the Cooperation and Brotherhood party between 1959 and 1961.

== Biography ==
Abu Rokan was born in Isfiya during the Ottoman era. During the Arab revolt in the late 1930s, he played a crucial role in establishing connections with Abba Hushi (secretary of Haifa Workers Council) and the Haganah. He was also a member of the Histadrut-affiliated Union of Workers in Eretz Yisrael.

During the 1948 Arab-Israeli War Abu Rokan recruited Druze volunteers to fight in the Israel Defense Forces. Following the war, he helped establish co-operative groups in Druze and Arab villages, including Bustan, which sold vegetables.

In 1950 he became head of Isfiya local council, a position he held until 1959. That year, he was elected to the Knesset as a representative of the Cooperation and Brotherhood party. Despite the party maintaining its two-seat strength in the 1961 elections, Abu Rokan and his colleague Yussef Diab lost their seats.

In 1963, Abu Rokan was appointed as a Qadi of the Druze Religious Court. Later, in 1980, he became a qadi in the Druze Religious Appeals Court.

He died on 20 November 1989.
