= Druze in Israel =

Ethnoreligious minority in Israel

Israeli Druze
الدروز الإسرائيليون דְּרוּזִים יִשְׂרְאֵלִים
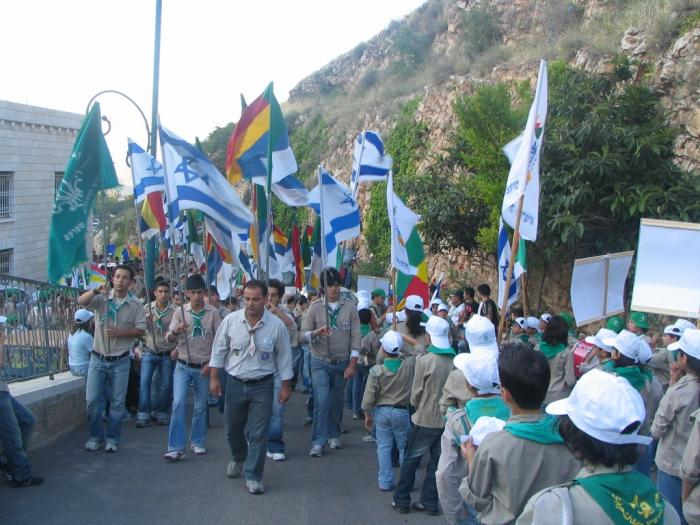
- Scouts near Tiberias marching to the tomb of Jethro (2006)

Total population
- c. 150,000 (2022)

Regions with significant populations
- Israel: 119,400
- Golan Heights: 29,364 (2024)

Languages
- Levantine Arabic (native); Hebrew

Religion
- Druze faith

Related ethnic groups
- Other Israeli and Palestinian Arabs, other Druze, other Syrians

Israeli Druze or Druze Israelis (Arabic: الدروز الإسرائيليون; Hebrew: דְּרוּזִים יִשְׂרְאֵלִים) are an ethnoreligious minority among the Arab citizens of Israel. They preserve the Arabic language and culture as central components of their identity, and Arabic remains their primary language. Survey data indicates that roughly 70% of Druze identify as ethnically Arab, and that Israeli Druze prioritize their identity first as Druze, second as Arab, and third as Israeli. Few Druze identify as Palestinian. Israel has the world's third-largest Druze population, after Syria and Lebanon. At the end of 2022, there were 150,000 Druze people living within Israel, representing a ten-fold increase since 1948. Druze comprise 1.6% of the total population of Israel. The majority of Israeli Druze are concentrated in northern Israel, especially in Galilee and Carmel. They are also found in Golan Heights, which is Syrian territory occupied by Israel.

In 1957, at the request of Druze leaders, the Israeli government designated Druze Israelis as a distinct religious community. Alongside the Jewish majority and the Circassian minority, Druze have been required by law since 1956 to serve in the Israel Defense Forces. However, as is the case for the Circassian community, only men are conscripted. Druze men have one of the highest enlistment rates in the country, at over 80%. Druze women, in contrast with Jewish women, are exempted from mandatory military service. Members of the Druze community have held positions in the Israeli Knesset and attained other top positions in politics, government and public service.

The Druze ethnic religion, called Druzism, originated in the Fatimid Caliphate in 11th century Egypt. It is a monotheistic faith that espouses the divinity of the Fatimid Caliph, a belief that is considered heretical in Islam. Druzism developed from Isma'ilism, a branch of Shia Islam, but the Druze do not consider themselves Muslims.

== Religious development ==
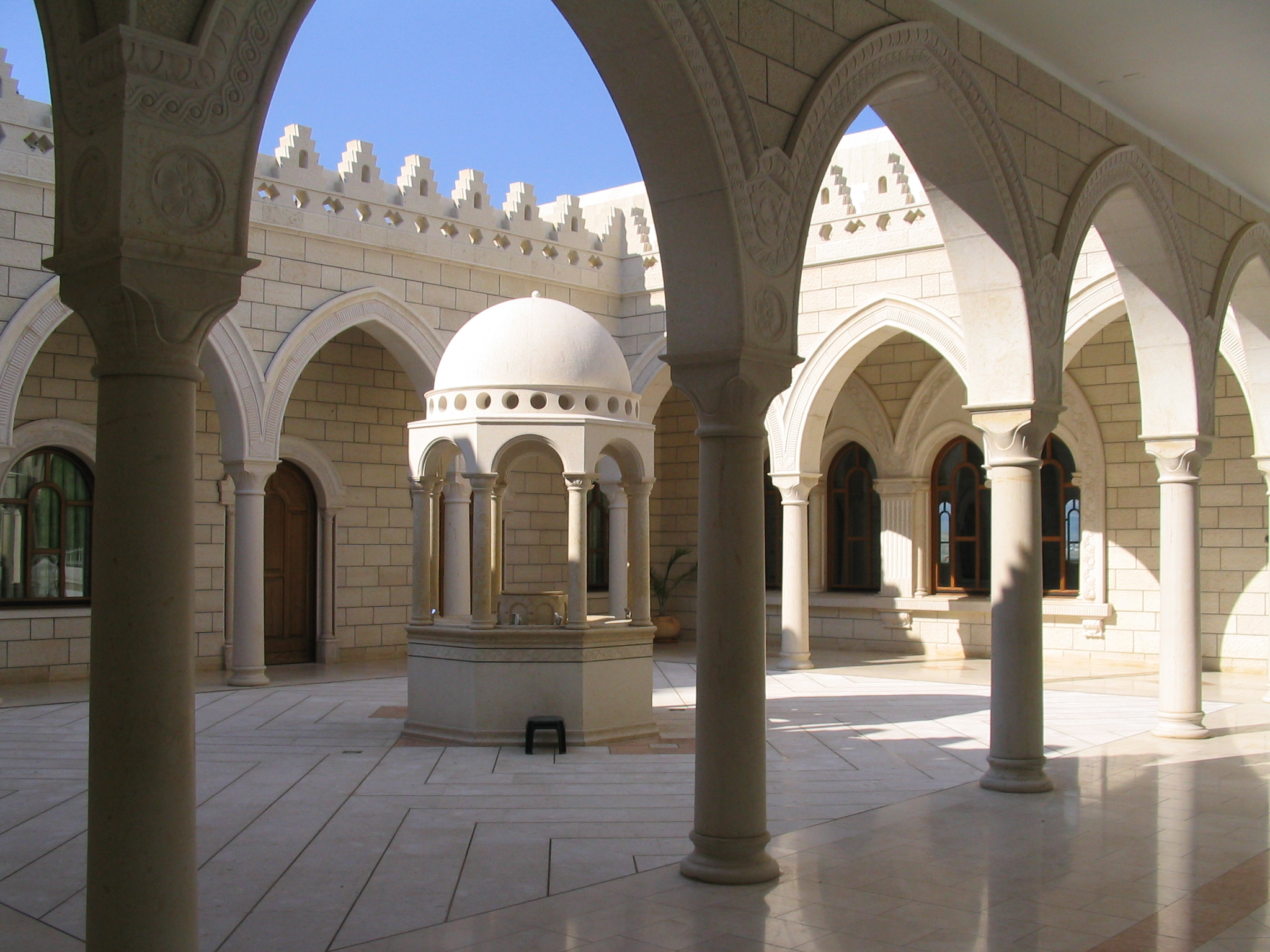
Jethro shrine and temple of Druze in Hittin, northern Israel

Druzism branched off from Islam in the 10th and 11th centuries and is now considered its own separate religion. Originating in Egypt, the religion incorporates elements of Hindu and Greek philosophy into the tenets of Islam. The Druze do not permit conversions because they believe that only the first generation after the establishment of the Druze religion had an opportunity to join, and every Druze individual alive today is reincarnated from that generation. Much like the Abrahamic faiths, the Druze religion is monotheistic, while recognizing many prophets, including Jesus, John the Baptist, Muhammad, Khidr, and Moses. The most respected prophet in Druzism is Jethro, Moses' father-in-law.

The Epistles of Wisdom is the foundational text of the Druze faith. The Druze faith incorporates elements of Islam's Ismailism, Gnosticism, Neoplatonism, Pythagoreanism, Christianity, Hinduism and other philosophies and beliefs, creating a distinct and secretive theology known to interpret esoterically religious scriptures, and to highlight the role of the mind and truthfulness.

Within the Druze community, there are two different sub-groups. There is the al-Juhhal, or the Ignorant, and al-Uqqal, the Knowledgeable. The al-Juhhal group does not have permission to view the holy texts, and they do not attend religious meetings. About 80% of the Druze people fall into the category of the Ignorant. The al-Uqqal must follow ascetic rulings including following a dress code. The most powerful 5% of the Knowledgeable group are where the spiritual leaders of the religion come from. As for important rules that the Druze must follow, they are not allowed to drink alcohol, eat pork, or smoke tobacco, similar to the dietary laws in Islam. Polygamy is prohibited, and men and women are viewed as equals. Many of the Druze living in Israel fully participate in Israeli society, and many of them serve in the Israeli Defense Forces.

The Druze revere the father-in-law of Moses, Jethro or Reuel, a Kenite shepherd and priest of Midian. In the Exodus, Moses' father-in-law is initially referred to as "Reuel" (Exodus 2:18) but then as "Jethro" (Exodus 3:1). According to the biblical narrative, Jethro joined and assisted the Israelites in the desert during the Exodus, accepted monotheism, but ultimately rejoined his own people. The tomb of Jethro near Tiberias is the most important religious site for the Druze community and they gather there every April.

Amin Tarif was the qadi, or spiritual leader, of the Druze in Mandatory Palestine from 1928 and then Israel until his death in 1993. He was highly esteemed and regarded by many within the community as the preeminent spiritual authority in the Druze world.

In January 2004, the current spiritual leader, Sheikh Muwaffak Tarīf, called on all non-Jews in Israel to observe the Seven Noahide Laws, as laid down in the Bible and expounded upon in Jewish tradition. The mayor of the Galilean city of Shefa-'Amr also signed the document. The declaration includes the commitment to make a "... better humane world based on the Seven Noahide Commandments and the values they represent commanded by the Creator to all mankind through Moses on Mount Sinai".

== History in the Levant ==
Video clips from the archive of Israel's Channel 2 news company showing Israeli Druze. The flags shown are the Druze flags.

The Druze (Arabic: درزي, Derzī or Durzī, pl.: دروز, Durūz; Hebrew: דְּרוּזִים, Druzim; they call themselves al-Muwaḥḥidīn, lit. 'the Monotheists') are an esoteric, monotheistic religious community found primarily in Syria, Lebanon, Israel, and Jordan. The religion incorporates elements of Isma'ilism, Gnosticism, Neoplatonism, and other philosophies. The Druze call themselves Ahl al-Tawhid – 'People of Unitarianism or Monotheism' – or al-Muwaḥḥidūn, 'Unitarians, Monotheists'. Amin Tarif was the preeminent religious leader of the community until his death in 1993.He was succeced by his son Muwaffaq Tarif.

Historically the relationship between the Druze and Muslims has been characterized by intense persecution. The Druze faith is often classified as a branch of Isma'ili. Although the faith originally developed out of Ismaili Islam, most Druze do not identify as Muslims, and they do not accept the five pillars of Islam. The Druze have frequently experienced persecution by different Muslim regimes such as the Shia Fatimid Caliphate, Sunni Ottoman Empire, and Egypt Eyalet. The persecution of the Druze included massacres, demolishing Druze prayer houses and holy places and forced conversion to Islam. Those were no ordinary killings: they were meant to eradicate the entire community according to the Druze narrative.

Historically, there have been conflicts in the relationship between the Druze and Jews. Anti-Jewish (antisemitic) bias is manifest in the Druze literature such as the Epistles of Wisdom; for example, in an epistle ascribed to one of the founders of Druzism, Baha al-Din al-Muqtana, probably written sometime between AD 1027 and AD 1042, accused Jews of killing the sacred prophets. On the other hand, Benjamin of Tudela, a Jewish traveler from the 12th century, pointed out that the Druze maintained good commercial relations with the Jews nearby, and, according to him, this was because the Druze liked the Jewish people. Yet, the Jews and Druze lived isolated from each other, except in a few mixed towns such as Deir al-Qamar and Peki'in.

Conflict between Druze and Jews occurred during 17th century Druze power struggle in Mount Lebanon, and Druze destruction of Jewish settlements of Galilee such as the 1660 destruction of Safed and the 1660 destruction of Tiberias. The 1834 looting of Safed was a month-long attack on the Jewish community of Safed in the Sidon Eyalet of the Ottoman Empire by Arabs and Druze during the Peasants' revolt in Palestine. It began on Sunday, June 15 (7 Sivan), the day after the Jewish holiday of Shavuot, and lasted for 33 days. It has been described as a spontaneous attack on a defenseless population during the armed uprising against the rule of Ibrahim Pasha of Egypt, the Ottoman governor. The event took place during a power vacuum while Ibrahim Pasha was fighting to quell the wider revolt in Jerusalem.

During the Druze revolt against the rule of Ibrahim Pasha of Egypt, the Jewish community in Safad was attacked by Druze rebels in early July 1838. The violence against the Jews included plundering their homes and desecrating their synagogues.

Druze in Israel live in Mount Carmel, south of Haifa, and in Galilee. The Druze settlement on Mount Carmel is relatively recent, although the precise timeline remains uncertain. Scholars acknowledge one tradition suggesting they settled at Isfiya, following the downfall of the Lebanon-centered House Ma'an. Daliyat al-Karmel's populace comprised refugees from Aleppo who arrived during the early 19th century.

The 1922 census of Palestine lists 7,028 Druze in Mandatory Palestine (11 in Southern District, eight in Jerusalem-Jaffa, three in Samaria, and 7,006 in Northern District). The 1931 census shows an increase with 9,148 Druze (four in Southern District, 28 in Jerusalem District, and 9,116 in Northern District).

=== Attitude towards conflict between Jews and Palestinian Arabs ===
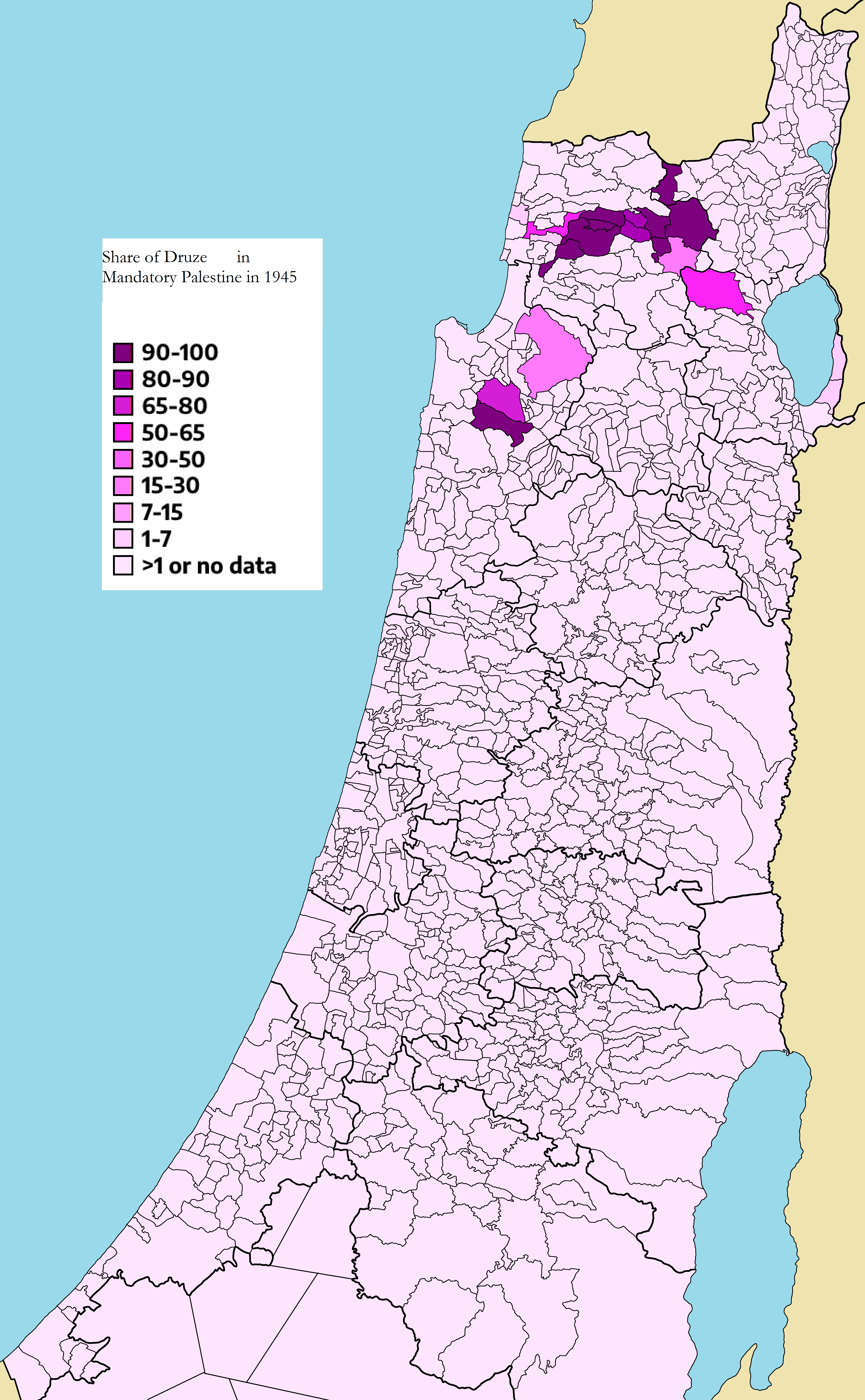
Druze in Mandatory Palestine in 1945

Before the establishment of the State of Israel in 1948, the Druze lived in the Galilee and Mount Carmel, either in exclusively Druze villages or in villages mixed with Christians, where they had coexisted for centuries. Historically, the relationship between the Druze and their Christian neighbors was better compared to their relationship with their Muslim neighbors, especially Bedouins, in neighboring villages. According to historian Ilan Pappé, during the 1948 Arab–Israeli War, in villages partly inhabited by Druze, Christians were generally exempt from expulsion. Following the establishment of the State of Israel, Muslim refugees from neighboring villages that had been displaced during the war settled in mixed Druze-Christian villages such as Abu Snan, Rameh, and Maghar.

During the 1947–48 Civil War in Mandatory Palestine, the Druze in Mandatory Palestine were under pressure from both the Jewish Yishuv leadership and from the Palestinian Arab Higher Committee, and found it difficult to form an opinion about the conflict between the Jews and the Palestinian Arabs. Noble Druze men from nearby countries visited Druze villages in Palestine and preached neutrality. During the early days of the conflict, a meeting of all the noblemen from all the Druze villages was conducted in Daliyat al-Karmel, where they all agreed not to take part in the riots instigated by the Arab Higher Committee. This decision was backed by Druze leaders in Jabal al-Druze. In the Druze community, there were opposing trends: In mixed Druze and Muslim villages such as Isfiya, Shefa-'Amr, and Maghar, where old sectarian disputes between Druze and Muslims shaped local dynamics, and in Druze villages near Haifa and the Jewish settlement in the western Galilee, the local Druze leaders tended to prefer the Jews in the conflict; at the Druze villages deep in Arab areas, the local leaders were more careful with support of the Jews. Yanuh and Jat were among several Druze villages located in the military zone of Arab Liberation Army (ALA) of Fawzi al-Qawuqji. Josh Palmon was tasked by the Jewish Agency for Israel to manage the relationship with the Druze. He initially led a preventive approach with the Druze, aimed at making sure the Druze would not join the Arab Higher Committee.

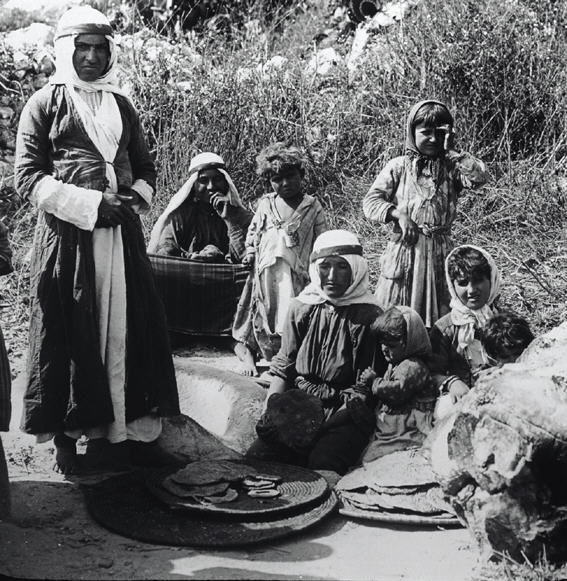
Druze family in Palestine making bread (1920)

The contacts between the Druze and the Jewish leadership were made through Labib Hussein Abu Rokan from Isfya and Salah-Hassan Hanifes from Shefa-'Amr (both became members of the Knesset after Israel's establishment). Hanifas managed to bring the Druze village Yarka to co-operate with the Jews.

=== Arrival of Druze volunteers to fight in the 1948 Arab–Israeli War ===
During the war, Druze volunteers arrived to Mandatory Palestine in order to help defend the Druze villages there. When the Arab Liberation Army (ALA) was created by the Arab League, Shakib Wahhab, a Syrian–Druze military commander resigned from the Syrian army and established a Druze battalion for the ALA, collecting Druze volunteers who joined mostly due to economic reasons from Syria and Lebanon. Wahhab brought around 500 men and arrived to Shefa-'Amr in Palestine, where he established his command on 30 March 1948. The commander of the ALA, Fawzi al-Qawuqji, planned to deploy the Druze battalion in the northern regions of Samaria under his command, but the military committee of the Arab League decided to establish a separate command for the Druze for the region near the city of Haifa, excluding Acre. Wahhab traveled through the western Galilee region and sent men to the Druze villages of the Carmel. As the Druze volunteers arrived, there were attempts to talk with the volunteers, due to fear local Druze will join them. Najib Mansour, the head of Isfiya, met with agents of the Hagannah in Haifa to discuss the arrival of Wahhab. Mansour did not agree to the demand that the local Druze would forcibly oppose the volunteers, and instead proposed the Jews bribe Wahhab to abandon his command.

== Demographics ==
Druze in Israel population pyramid in 2020

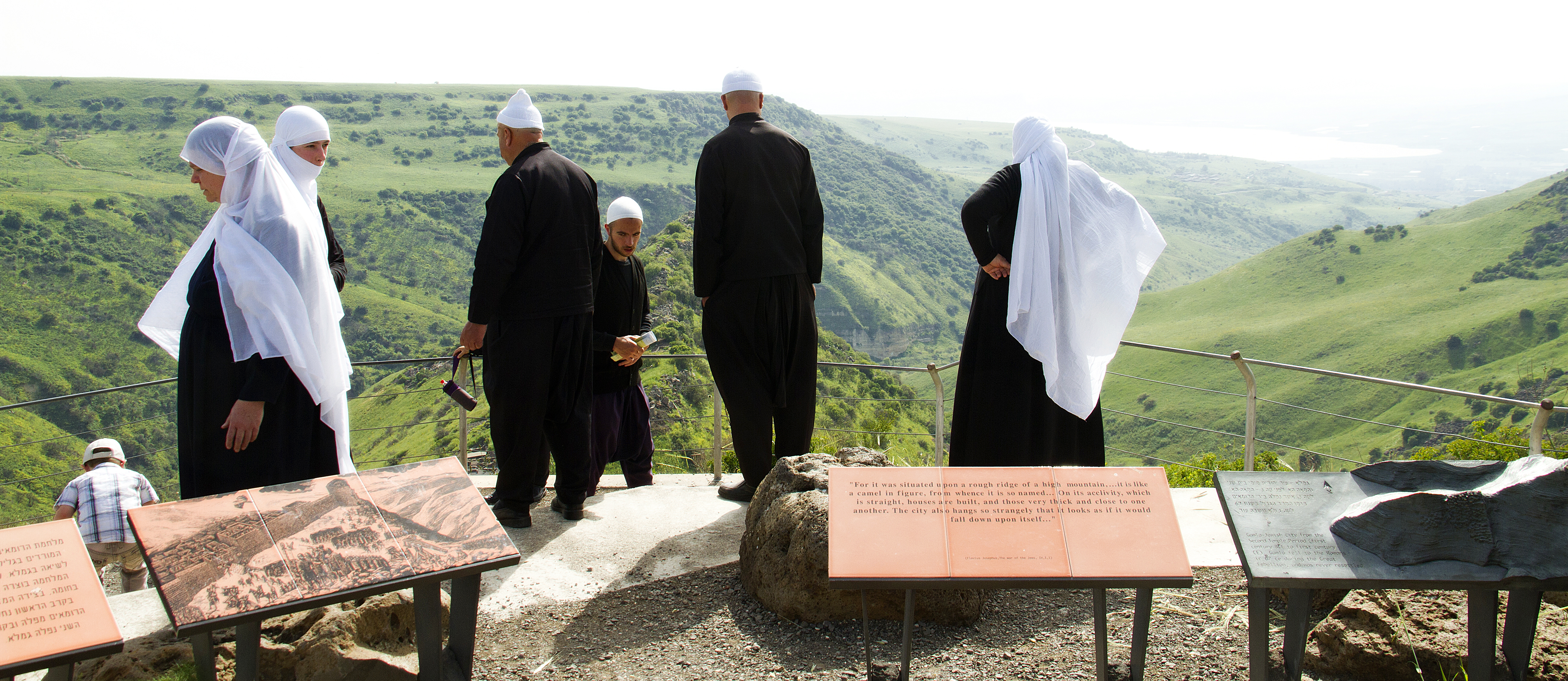
Druze families in Golan Heights: the Druze in Israel have a low fertility-rate.

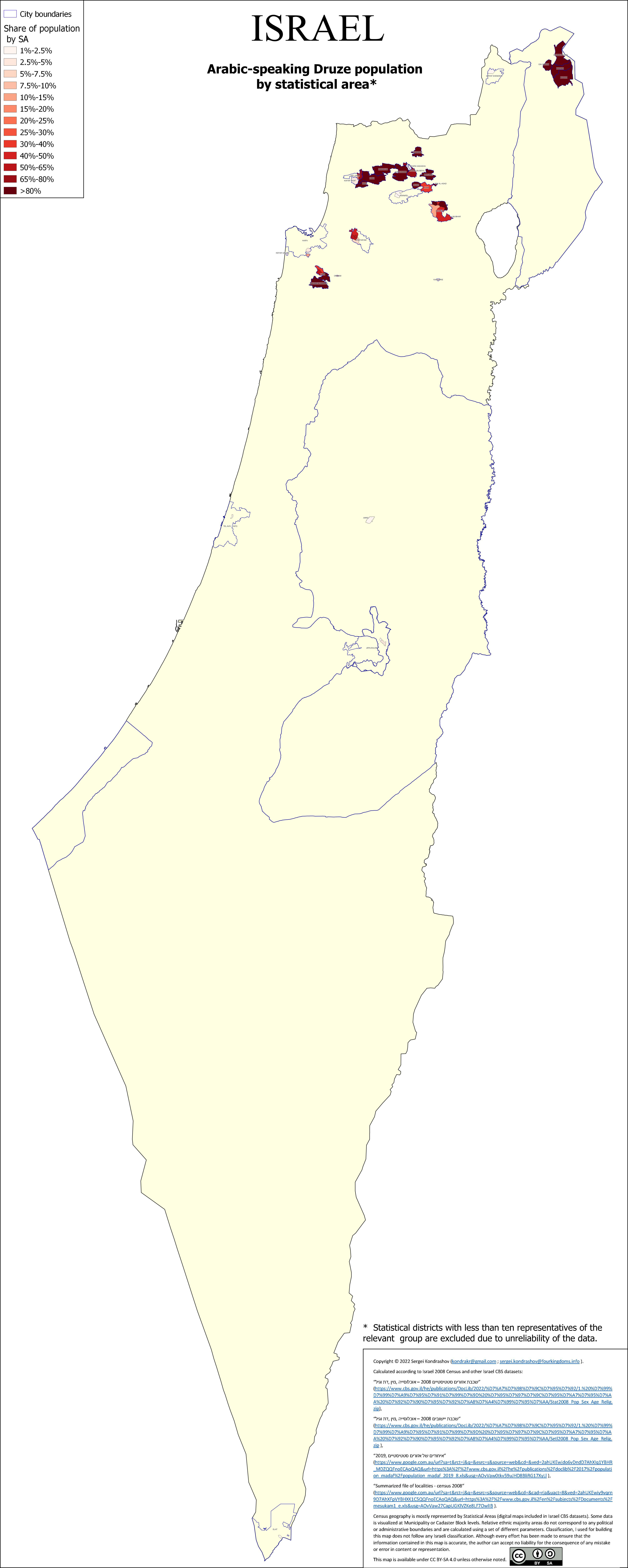
Geographical distribution of the Arabic-speaking Druze population of Israel by statistical area.

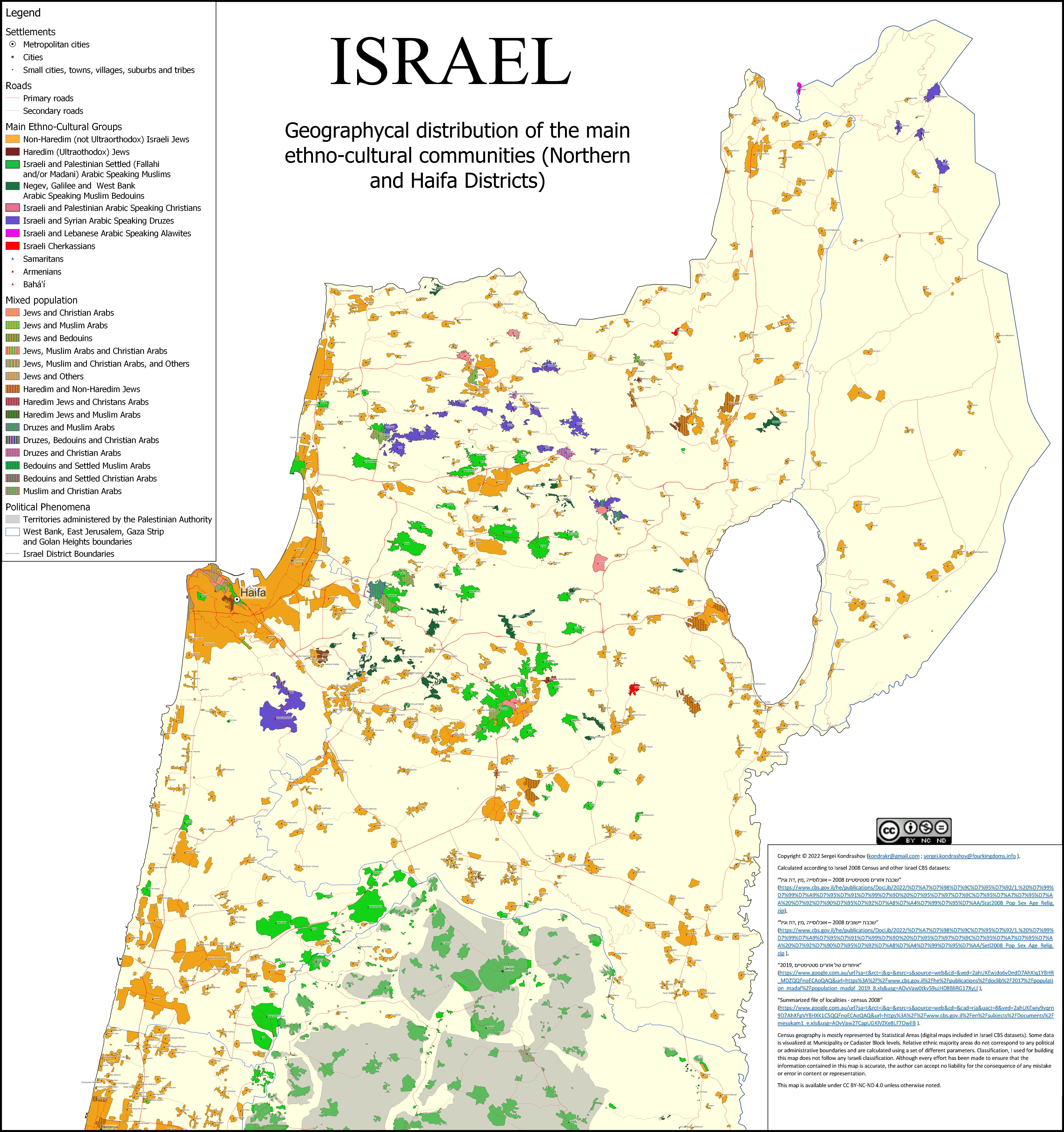
Geographical distribution of the main ethno-cultural communities Haifa and Northern districts.

According to the Israeli Central Bureau of Statistics census in 2020, the Druze make up about 7.6% of the Arab citizens of Israel, and the Druze population in Israel was approximately 145,000. At the end of 2019, approximately 81% of the Israeli Druze population lived in the Northern District and 19% lived in the Haifa District, and the largest population of Druze were Daliyat al-Karmel and Yirka, also called Yarka.

The Israeli Druze population growth rate is 1.4%, which is lower than the Muslim population growth rate (2.5%) and the total population growth (1.7%), but higher than the Arab Christian population growth rate (1.0%). At the end of 2017, the average age of the Israeli Druze was 27.9. About 26.3% of the Israeli Druze population are under 14 years old and about 6.1% of the Israeli Druze are 65 years and over. Since the year 2000, the Israeli Druze community has witnessed a significant decrease in fertility-rate and a significant increase in life expectancy. The fertility rate for Israeli Druze in 2017 is 2.1 children per woman, while the fertility rate among Jewish women (3.2) and Muslim women (3.4) and the fertility rate among Israeli Christian women (1.9).

=== Settlements ===
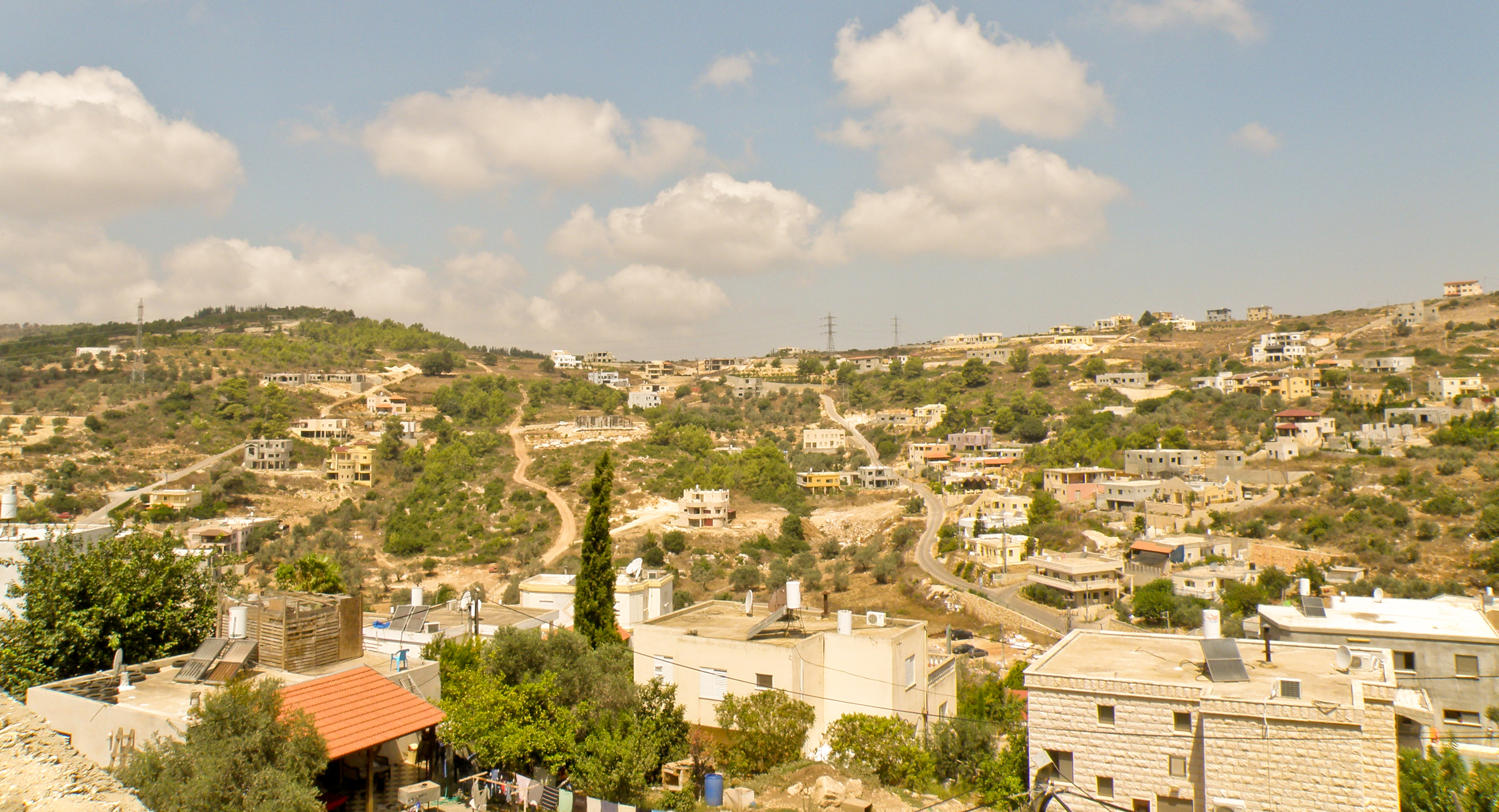
Daliyat al-Karmel: the largest Druze town in Israel

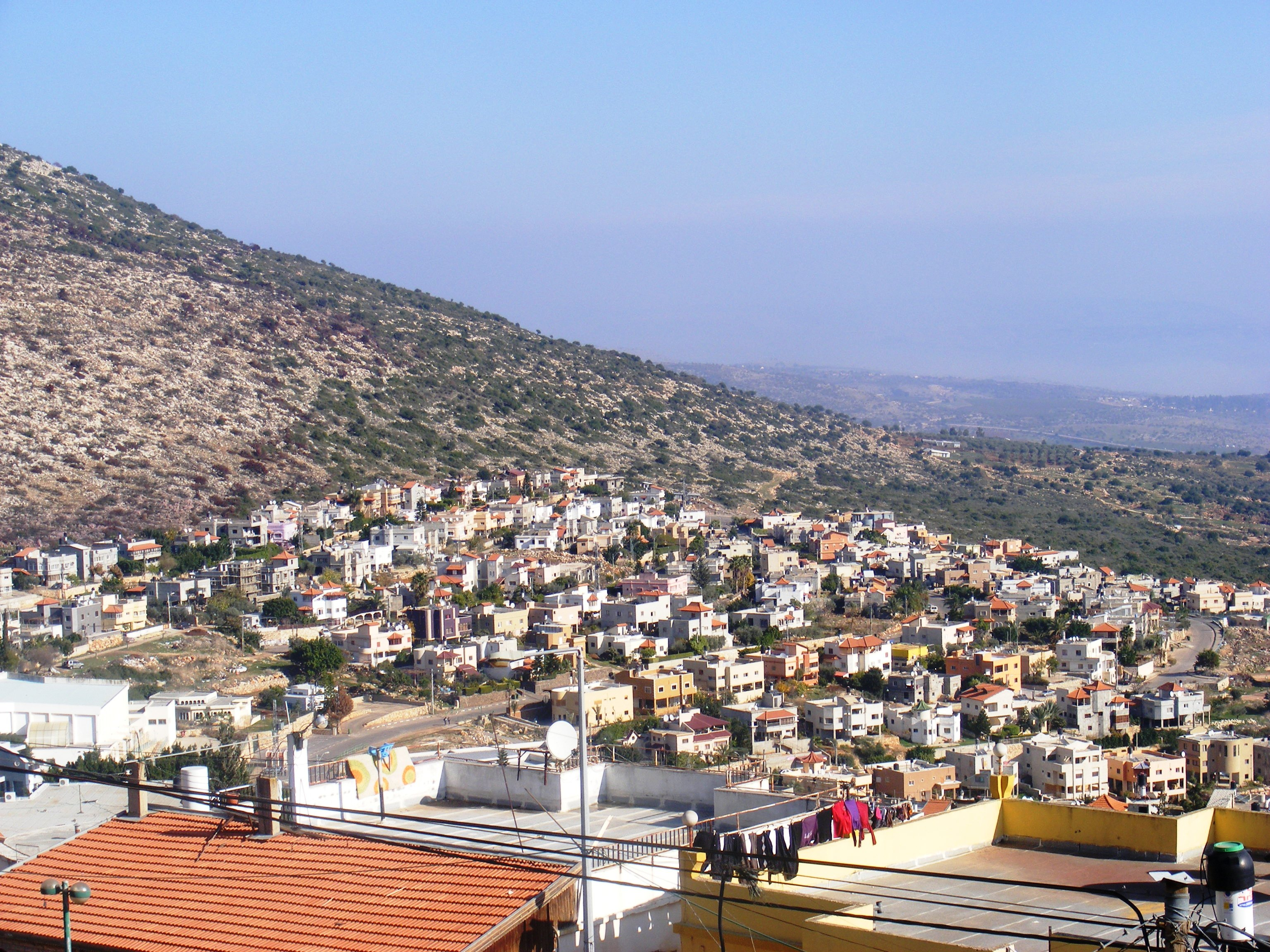
Maghar: the second largest Druze town in the Northern District

The Druze in Israel live in a handful of sectarian villages and several mixed-religion Arab localities in pre-1967 Israel (Upper and Lower Galilee and Mount Carmel) and on the Golan Heights.

==== Mandatory Palestine period ====
A detailed population breakdown entitled Village Statistics, 1945 was published during the Mandatory Palestine period. The population was split into Muslims, Jews, Christians and “Others”. These “others” were almost exclusively Druze (the 1931 census of Palestine had provided a breakdown, showing Druze were 91% of the total “others”, and 99% of the “others” living outside the main towns). The table below shows the 20 largest “others” localities in 1945, totalling 13,670 people out of a total of 14,100 “others” in Mandatory Palestine.

20 largest “Other” population locations in Mandatory Palestine, 1945
	Name	Population	
1	Dalyat el Karmil	2,040	99%
2	Beit Jann	1,520	100%
3	Yirka	1,420	95%
4	Isfiya	1,310	73%
5	Maghar and El Mansura	1,250	58%
6	Julis	780	95%
7	Hurfeish	780	94%
8	Shafa ‘Amr	690	19%
9	El Buqeia	520	53%
10	Er Rama	440	26%
11	Abu Sinan	410	50%
12	Yanuh	410	100%
13	Kisra	390	81%
14	Sajur	340	97%
15	Tel Aviv (mostly agnostics)	300	0%
16	Haifa (mostly Baháʼís)	290	0%
17	Kafr Sumei'	260	87%
18	Nablus (mostly Samaritans)	210	1%
19	Jatt	190	95%
20	Ein el Asad	120	100%
	Subtotal (out of 14,100)	13,670	

==== Modern Israel ====
The 2017 population figures were as follows (absolute figures and percentage of overall population):

Settlements in Israel and the Golan Heights with significant Druze populations
Northern District (not including Golan Subdistrict)	Haifa District	Golan Subdistrict (sub-section of Northern District)
Yarka (16,400 – 97.9%); Maghar (12,900 – 57.9%); Beit Jann (11,700 – 99.8%); Kisra-Sumei (8,100 – 95%); Yanuh-Jat (6,500 – 100%); Julis (6,300 – 100%); Hurfeish (6,000 – 96.3%); Shefa-'Amr (5,700 – 13.9%); Peki'in (4,500 – 78%); Sajur (4,148 – 100%); Abu Snan (4,100 – 30%); Rameh (2,400 – 31%); Ein al-Asad (871 – 100%)	Daliyat al-Karmel (16,700 – 97%); Isfiya (9,200 – 76%)	Majdal Shams (10,930 – 100%); Buq'ata (6,485 – 100%); Mas'ade (3,592 – 100%); Ein Qiniyye (2,033 – 100%)

=== Language ===
The Druze citizens of Israel are Arab in culture, and their mother tongue is the Arabic language. The Druze Arabic dialect, especially in the villages, is often different from the other regional Arabic dialects. Druze Arabic dialect is distinguished from others by retention of the phoneme /q/. Linguistically, Israeli Druze are fluently bilingual, speaking both a Central Northern Levantine Arabic dialect and Hebrew. In Druze Arab homes and towns in Israel, the primary language spoken is Arabic, while some Hebrew words have entered the colloquial Arabic dialect. They often use Hebrew characters to write their Arabic dialect online.

=== Socio-economic status ===
A study published by the Taub Center for Social Policy Studies in 2017 found that Druze population has the second highest achievements in the Arab sector on all indices: bagrut scores, rates of college graduates, and fields of employment. The Israeli Arab Christian population has the highest achievements.

==== Educational prospects ====
According to the Israeli Central Bureau of Statistics census in 2020, 79.9% of Druze in Israel were entitled to a matriculation certificate, which was higher than the proportion of Muslims (60.3%), but was lower than that of Christians (83.6%) and Jews (80.2%) with a matriculation certificate. According to the Israeli Central Bureau of Statistics census in 2020, 15.3% of Druze in Israel have a college degree, which was lower than the number of Christians (70.9%), but slightly higher than the share of Muslims (10%) with a degree.

== Druze in the Israeli-occupied Golan Heights ==
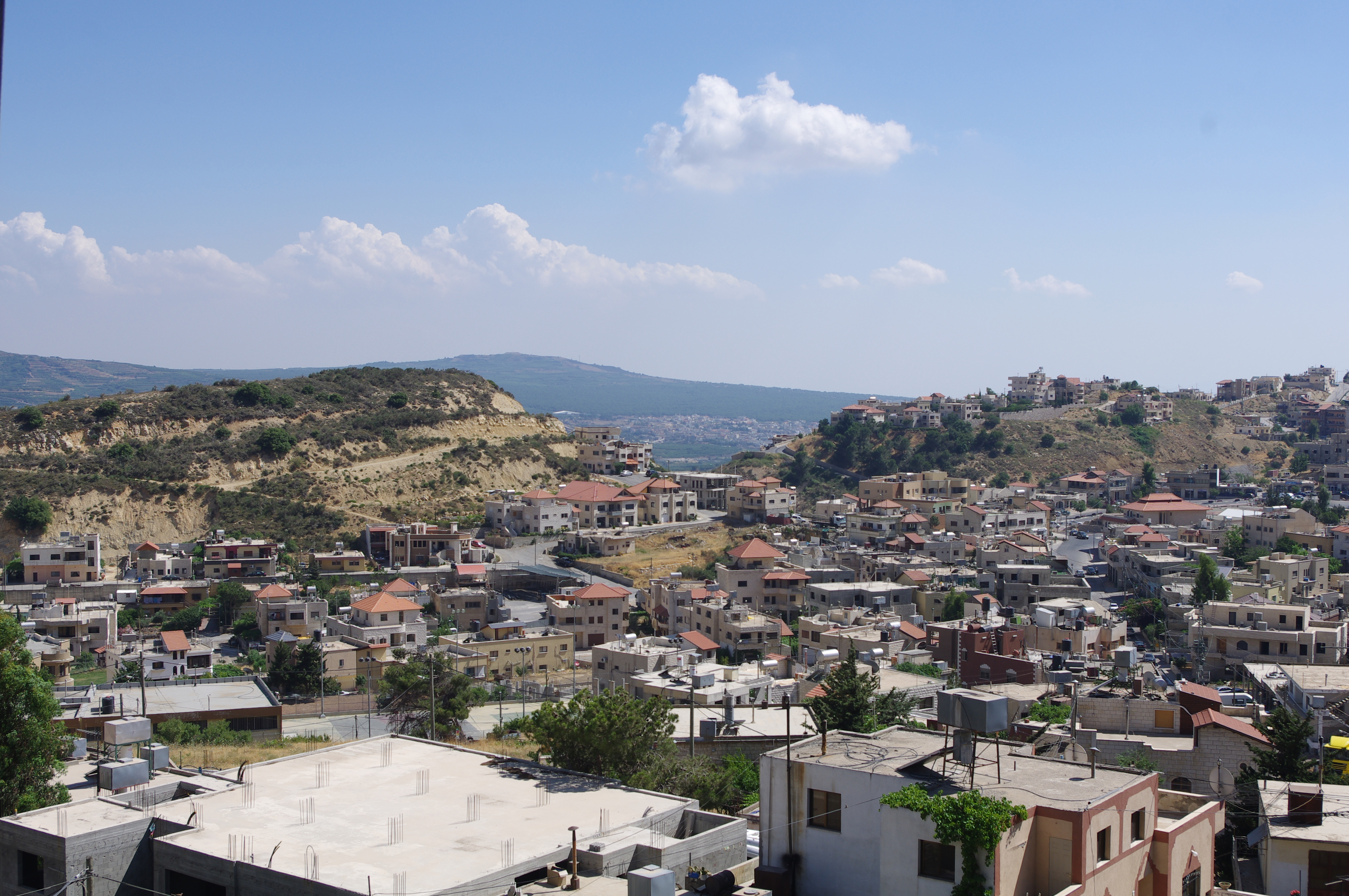
Majdal Shams: the largest Druze town in the Golan Heights

There are four Druze villages in the Israeli-annexed portion of the Golan Heights—Majdal Shams, Mas'ade, Buq'ata, and Ein Qiniyye—in which 26,000 Druze live. In 2012, most of the Druze residents of the Golan Heights considered themselves Syrians and declined to take Israeli citizenship, instead holding Israeli permanent resident status; in place of an Israeli passport they used an Israeli-issued laissez-passer document for traveling abroad, on which the citizenship paragraph was left empty. However, the onset of the Syrian civil war, the October 7 attacks, the killing of 12 Druze children in Majdal Shams by a rocket fired from Lebanese territory, and the new Syrian regime's massacres of Druze minorities in Suwayda have shifted their allegiance toward Israel. In the early 2020s, there was an increase in applications for Israeli citizenship, accelerating significantly by 2025, when upwards of six times more Druze applied for citizenship than in previous years.

Since the adoption of the 1981 Golan Heights Law, the territory has been under Israeli civil law, and incorporated into the Israeli system of local councils. After the annexation of the Golan Heights in 1981, the Israeli government offered citizenship to all non-Israelis living in the territory; as of 2011, less than 10% of the local Druze accepted it. In 2012, however, due to the Syrian civil war, there was greater interest among Druze in Israeli citizenship. By 2017, nearly 5,500 out of 26,500 residents had applied for and received an Israeli passport. The yearly number of applications steadily rose, with 183 applying in 2016, compared to only five in 2000. By mid 2022, 4,303 Druze, or 20% of the total Druze residents in the Golan Heights, became naturalized. As of March 2026, roughly 40% of Druze across the four Druze towns in the Golan Heights have taken Israeli citizenship.

During the 2011 Syrian uprising, Druze in the Golan Heights held several rallies in support of Syrian leader Bashar al-Assad. Public support for the Assad government has historically been high among Golan Druze, and Syria has secured agreements with the Israeli government to permit Golan Druze to conduct trade across the border with Syria. Some tensions have arisen in the community due to differing stances on the Syrian civil war, although open public support for the Syrian opposition has been relatively uncommon.

In the 2009 elections, 1,193 residents of the Alawite village of Ghajar and 809 residents of the Druze villages were eligible to vote, out of approximately 1,200 Ghajar residents and 12,600 Druze village residents who were of voting age. As Israel does not recognize the Syrian citizenship of Golan Druze, they are defined in Israeli records as "residents of the Golan Heights". Those who apply for and receive Israeli citizenship are entitled to vote in Israeli elections, run for Knesset, and receive an Israeli passport. Residents of Majdal Shams and the other Golan Druze villages are not drafted into the Israel Defense Forces. However, more than 80% of Druze men enlist.

According to a 2022 report, the Druze population in the Golan Heights is increasingly seeking Israeli citizenship. A record number of citizenship requests have been filed, with many preferring not to discuss this publicly due to community pressure and potential repercussions. Statistics reveal a sharp increase in citizenship requests, from 75 to 85 annually in 2017–2018 to 239 in 2021. In 2022, around 4,300 of the 21,000 Druze residents (approximately 20%) of the Golan Heights held Israeli citizenship. Hamas' October 7 attack and its escalation to the northern front has led to increased integration of the Druze communities in the Golan with Israeli authorities. In November 2023, the mayor of Majdal Shams, Dolan Abu Saleh, discussed the formation of the town's first IDF-trained guard squadron, calling it a milestone in the increasing "cooperation and harmony with IDF forces in the Golan villages". In January 2025, the IDF recorded the first large-scale enlistment of Golan Druze. During the first half of 2025, Golan Druze applications for Israeli citizenship jumped by 100% when compared to the entire year of 2024.

== Religiosity ==
According to a Pew Research Center survey conducted in 2015, Druze in Israel are generally more religious than Israeli Jews, but less than Israeli Christians and Muslims. Around half (49%) say religion is very important in their lives. About one third (26%) pray daily and 25% report that they attend prayer-houses of the Druze (khalwat) at least once a week. Israeli Druze also are more likely than Jews and less likely than Christians and Muslims to participate in weekly worship services. Nearly all (99%) Israeli Druze believe in God, of whom 84% say they are absolutely certain. According to the Israel Democracy Institute survey conducted in 2015, 43% of Druze in Israel identified as traditional, 36% identified as not religious at all, 14% identified as religious, 7% identified as very religious.

=== Beliefs ===
According to a Pew Research Center survey conducted in 2015, the majority of Druze are not comfortable with their children marrying outside of the faith; Druze are about equally uncomfortable with the prospect of a child of theirs marrying a Jew (87%), Muslim (85%) or Christian (87%). Christians and Druze also are more likely than Jews to say a good religious education is important for their children.

=== Identity ===
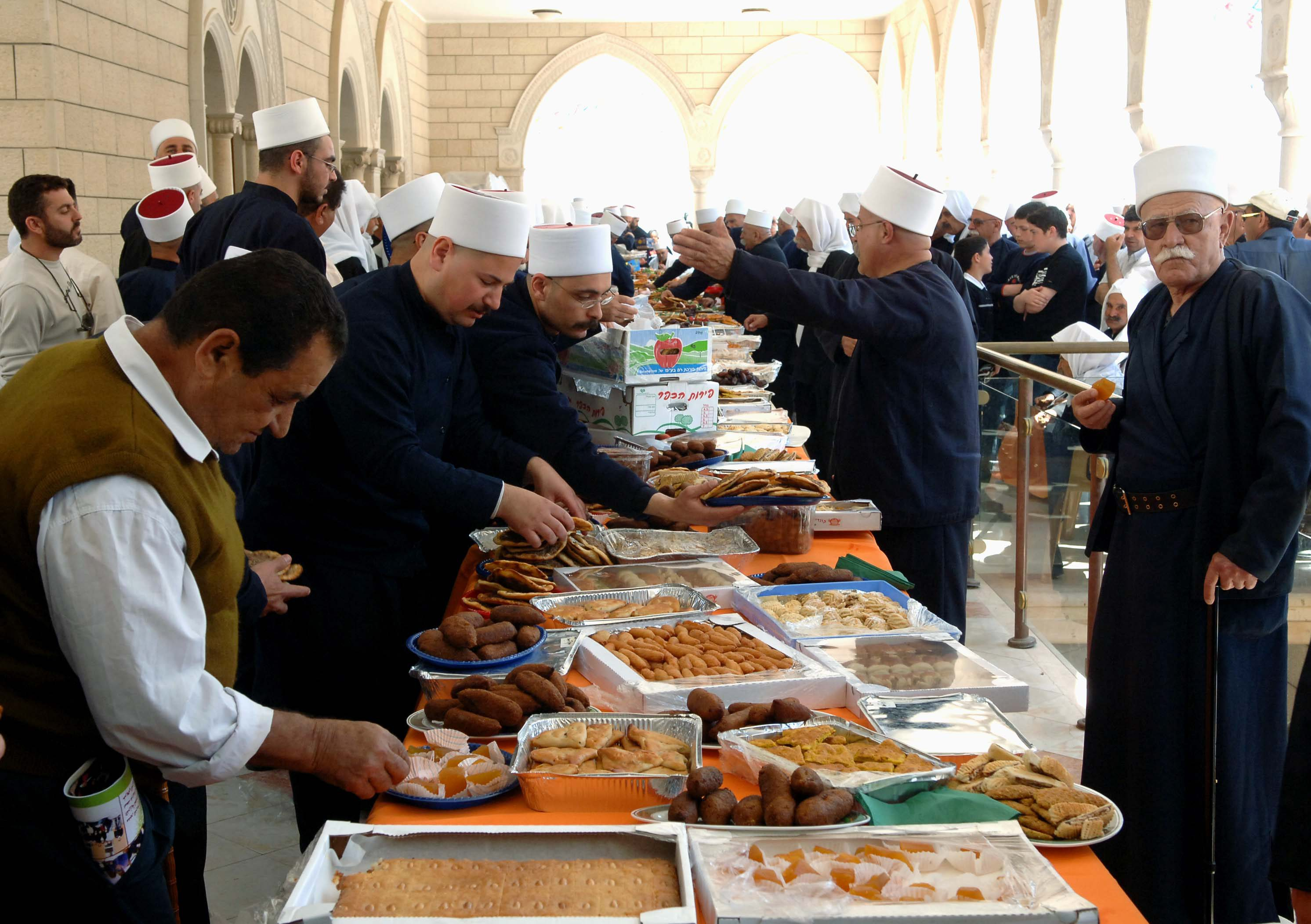
Ziyarat al-Nabi Shu'ayb, an annual festival held at the tomb of Prophet Shuayb

According to a Pew Research Center survey conducted in 2015, Druze in Israel are less likely than Christians or Muslims to say they are proud of their identity. About 90% say they have a strong sense of belonging to the Druze community. Approximately two thirds (64%) believe that they have a special responsibility to help fellow members of their religious group who are in need around the world.

The nature of Druze identity varies among Druze as well. Druze in Israel are divided among those who say their identity is mainly a matter of religion (18%), those who say being Druze is mainly about ancestry and/or culture (47%) and those who say their identity is characterized by a combination of religion and ancestry/culture (34%).

== Politics ==
Self Identification of young Druze, 2008
Druze Israelis	94%
Other	6%

Israeli Druze do not consider themselves Muslim, and see their faith as a separate and independent religion. While compared to Israeli Christians and Muslims, Druze place less emphasis on Arab identity and self-identify more as Israeli. However, they were less ready for personal relationships with Jews compared to Israeli Muslims and Christians.

Some scholars maintain that Israel has tried to separate the Druze from other Arab communities, and that the effort has influenced the way Israel's Druze perceive their modern identity.

In a survey conducted in 2008 by Dr. Yusuf Hassan of Tel Aviv University, 94% of Druze respondents identified as "Druze-Israelis" in the religious and national context, while a 2017 Pew Research Center poll reported that while 99% of Muslims and 96% of Christians identified as ethnically Arab, a smaller share of Druze, 71%, identified likewise. Other Druze respondents identify their ethnicity as "Druze" or "Druze-Arab". According to the Israel Democracy Institute survey conducted in 2015, around 54% of Druze respondents said that religious identity (the Druze identity) is the most important identity for them, followed by Israeli identity (37%) and Arab identity (5%).

=== Military service and Israeli politics ===
Druze citizens are prominent in the Israel Defense Forces and in politics. The bond between Jewish and Druze soldiers is commonly known by the term "a covenant of blood" (Hebrew: ברית דמים, brit damim).

Following Israel's establishment, the government mandated conscription for male Druze. From 1954 to 1956, the Druze community staged a resistance movement against this policy, known as the "conscription movement". Amin Tarif, the spiritual leader of the Druze community in Israel at the time, vehemently opposed compulsory military service. In 1953, he threatened excommunication for any Druze volunteering in the Israeli army and mobilized Druze women to resist conscription for their children. Sheikh Tarif also refused to sanction marriages involving soldiers, viewing conscription as a threat to the community's reputation and values.

On the contrary, another faction within the Druze community advocated for full cooperation with Israelis, including endorsing conscription. Notable leaders of this stance were Salah-Hassan Hanifes and Labib Hussein Abu Rokan.

Five Druze lawmakers were elected in 2009 to serve in the 18th Knesset, a disproportionately large number considering their population. Reda Mansour, a Druze poet, historian, and diplomat, explained: "We are the only non-Jewish minority that is drafted into the military, and we have an even higher percentage in the combat units and as officers than the Jewish members themselves. So we are considered a very nationalistic, patriotic community."

==== Druze pro-Zionism ====
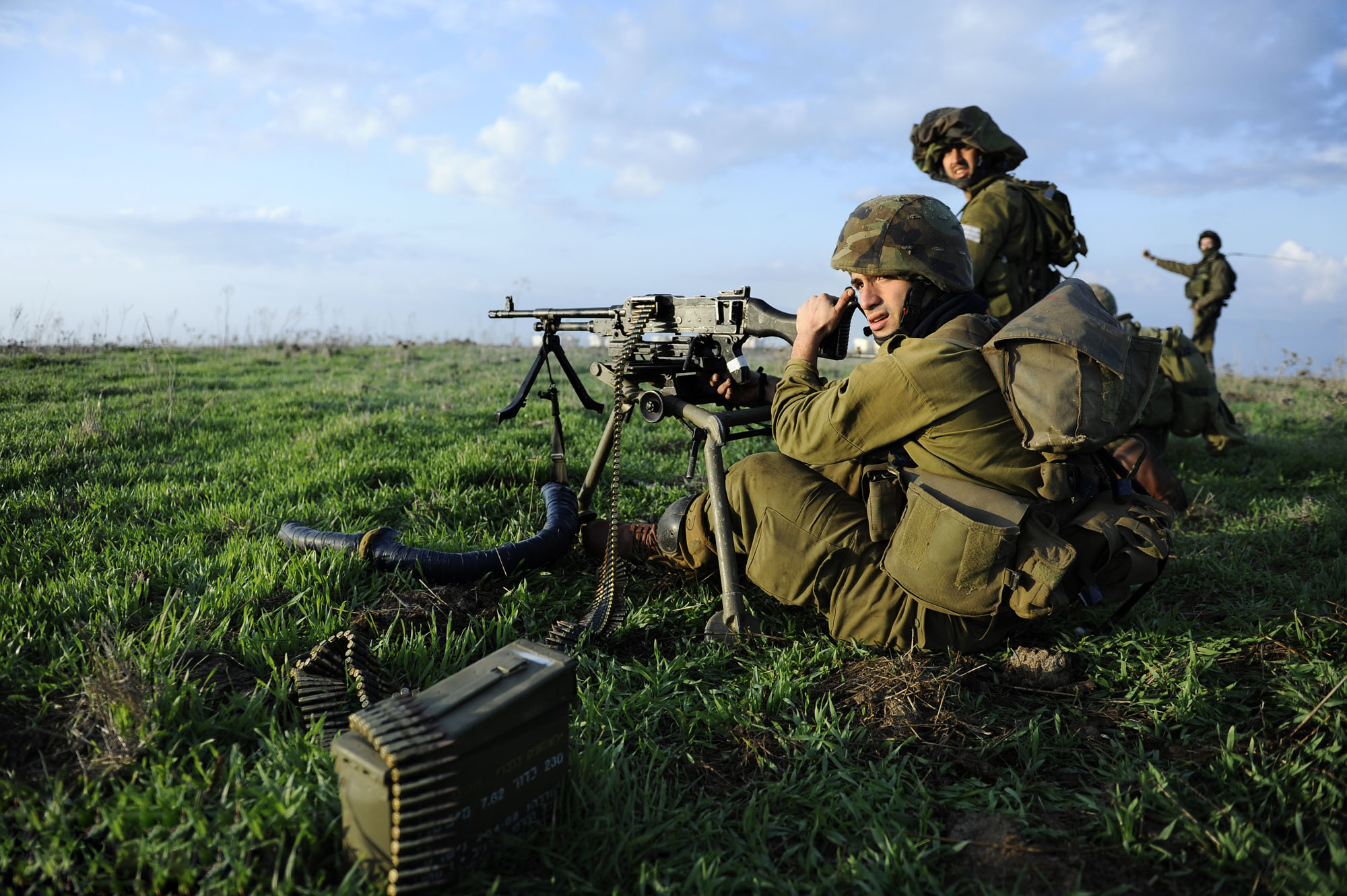
Soldiers from the Druze "Herev" Battalion of the Israel Defense Forces

In 1973, Amal Nasser el-Din founded the Zionist Druze Circle, a group whose aim was to encourage the Druze to support the state of Israel fully and unreservedly. Today, thousands of Israeli Druze belong to Druze Zionist movements.

In 2007, Nabiah A-Din, mayor of Kisra-Sumei, rejected the "multi-cultural" Israeli constitution proposed by the Israeli Arab organization Adalah: "The state of Israel is a Jewish state as well as a democratic state that espouses equality and elections. We invalidate and reject everything that the Adalah organization is requesting", he said. According to A-din, the fate of the Druze and the Circassians in Israel is intertwined with that of the state. "This is a blood pact, and a pact of the living. We are unwilling to support a substantial alteration to the nature of this state, to which we tied our destinies prior to its establishment", he said. As of 2005 there were 7,000 registered members in the Druze Zionist movement. In 2009, the movement held a Druze Zionist youth conference with 1,700 participants.

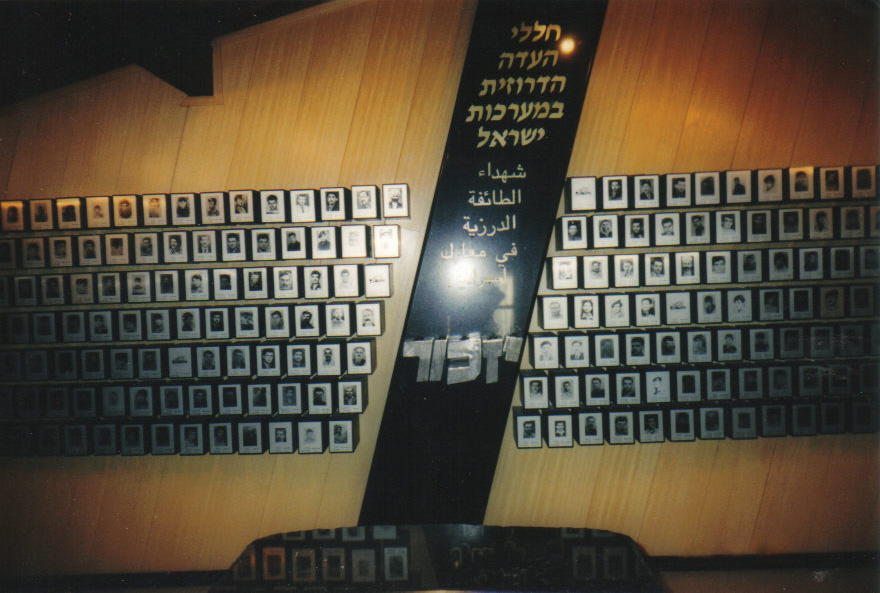
Memorial of fallen Druze IDF soldiers, Daliyat Al-Karmel

In a survey conducted in 2008 by Dr. Yusuf Hassan of Tel Aviv University found that out of 764 Druze participants, more than 94% identify as "Druze-Israelis" in the religious and national context.

On 30 June 2011, Haaretz reported that a growing number of Israeli Druze were joining elite units of the military, leaving the official Druze battalion, Herev, under-staffed. This trend has led to calls for its disbandment.

On May 15, 2015, it was announced that the Druze battalion Herev would be shut down, thereby allowing Druze soldiers to integrate into the rest of the IDF, a wish that was relayed to IDF senior staff by leaders in the Druze community as well as former Herev battalion commanders. After the July 2015 draft, the IDF no longer listed the Druze unit as an option. By September 2015, the battalion had been disbanded, and its soldiers joined other units.

Druze also serve in elite units of the IDF such as the Sayeret Matkal, and there are three Druze combat pilots serving in the Israeli Air Force.

== Intercommunal relationships ==
=== Relationship with Jewish Israelis ===
In 1948, many Druze volunteered for the Israeli army and no Druze villages were destroyed or permanently abandoned. Since the establishment of the state of Israel, the Druze have demonstrated solidarity with Israel and distanced themselves from Arab and Islamic radicalism. Israeli Druze citizens serve in the Israel Defense Forces. The Jewish-Druze partnership was often referred to as "a covenant of blood" (Hebrew: ברית דמים, brit damim) in recognition of the common military yoke carried by the two peoples for the security of the country. From 1957, the Israeli government formally recognized the Druze as a separate religious community, and are defined as a distinct ethnic group in the Israeli Ministry of Interior's census registration. On the other hand, the Israel Central Bureau of Statistics categorizes Druze as Arabs in their census. Israeli Druze do not consider themselves Muslim, and see their faith as a separate and independent religion. While compared to Israeli Christians and Muslims, Druze place less emphasis on their Arab identity and self-identify more as Israeli. However, they were less ready for personal relationships with Jews compared to Israeli Muslims and Christians. A trend Ibrahim attributes to cultural differences between Jews and Druze.

=== Relationship with Christian Israelis ===
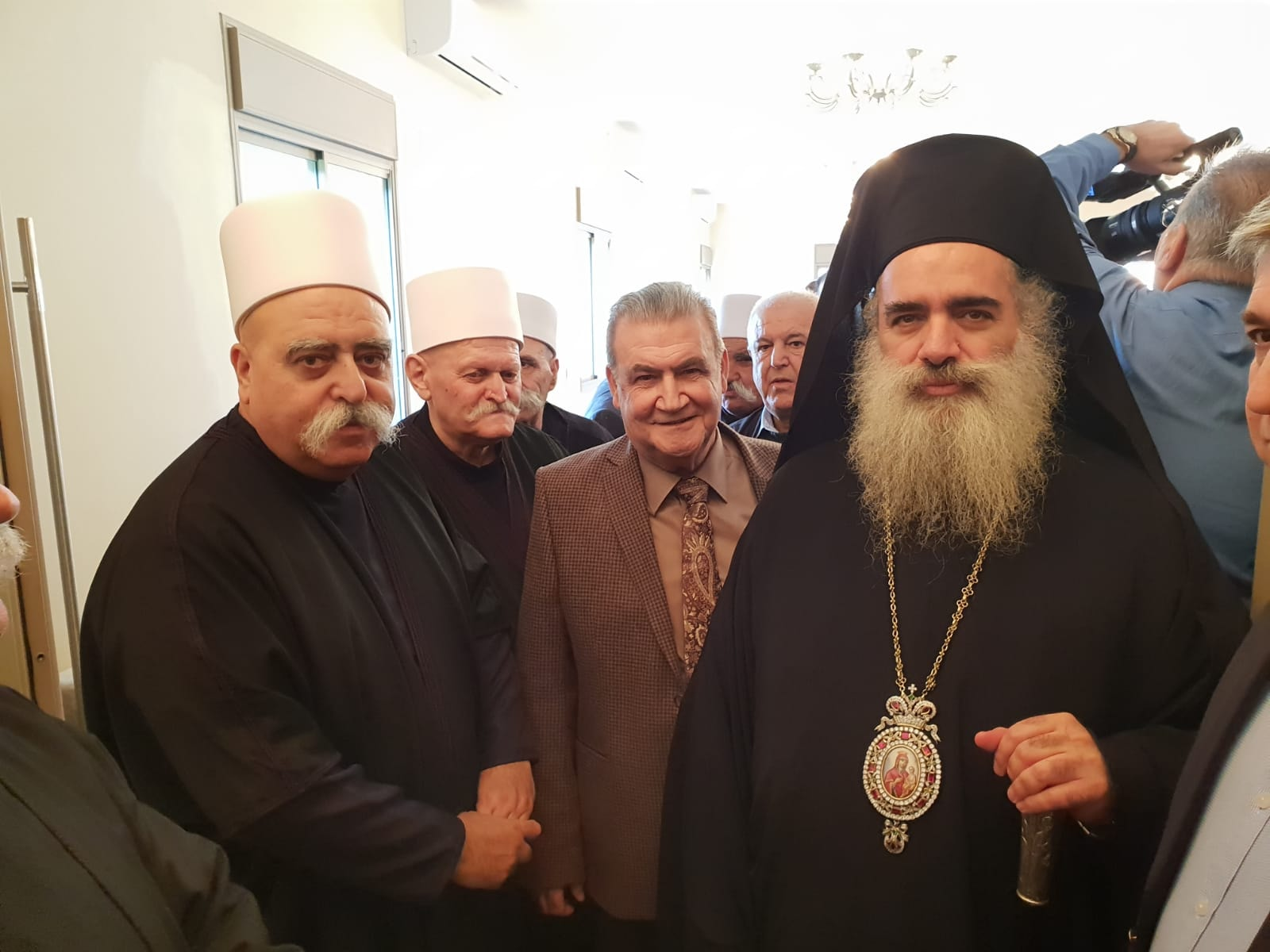
Druze and Christian clerics in Israel

The relationship between the Druze and Christians in Israel has been characterized by harmony and peaceful coexistence, and they live in peace and friendship together. However, there have been exceptions of rare clashes, including acts of violence by the Druze against Christians in 2005 in the town of Maghar. Druze and Christians in Israel celebrate each other's births, weddings, funerals, and celebrations such as the Christian festival of Mar Ilyas (Saint Elias) in Haifa. Many Druze and Muslims attend Christian schools in Israel, because Christian schools are high-performing and among the best schools in the country.

Interaction between Christians (members of the Maronite, Eastern Orthodox, Melkite, and other churches) and the Unitarian Druze have resulted in the establishment and existence of mixed villages and towns in Galilee region, Mount Carmel, and the Israeli-occupied portion of the Golan Heights. This includes Abu Snan, Daliyat al-Karmel, Ein Qiniyye, Hurfeish, Isfiya, Kafr Yasif, Kisra-Sumei, Majdal Shams, Maghar, Peki'in, Rameh and Shefa-Amr, where more than 82,000 Druze and 30,000 Christians live in these mixed villages and towns. Before Israel's occupation, Christians accounted for 12% of the population of the Golan Heights, and they tend to have a high presentation in science and in the white collar professions.

Israeli Druze and Muslims have comparable socio-economic standards when compared to their wealthier and more educated Israeli Christian counterparts. Despite rare exceptions of sectarian incidents between the more privileged Christian community and the Druze, scholar Ibtisam Ibrahim's research reveals that most Druze interviewees view their relationship with the Christian community more positively than with the Muslim community.

== See also ==
- Ahuzat Naftali
- IDF Sword Battalion
- List of Israeli Druze
- Majdal Shams attack
- Negev Bedouin
- Religion in Israel
