= Hadera Natural Region =

Coordinates: 32°26′05″N 34°55′06″E

- Natural Region
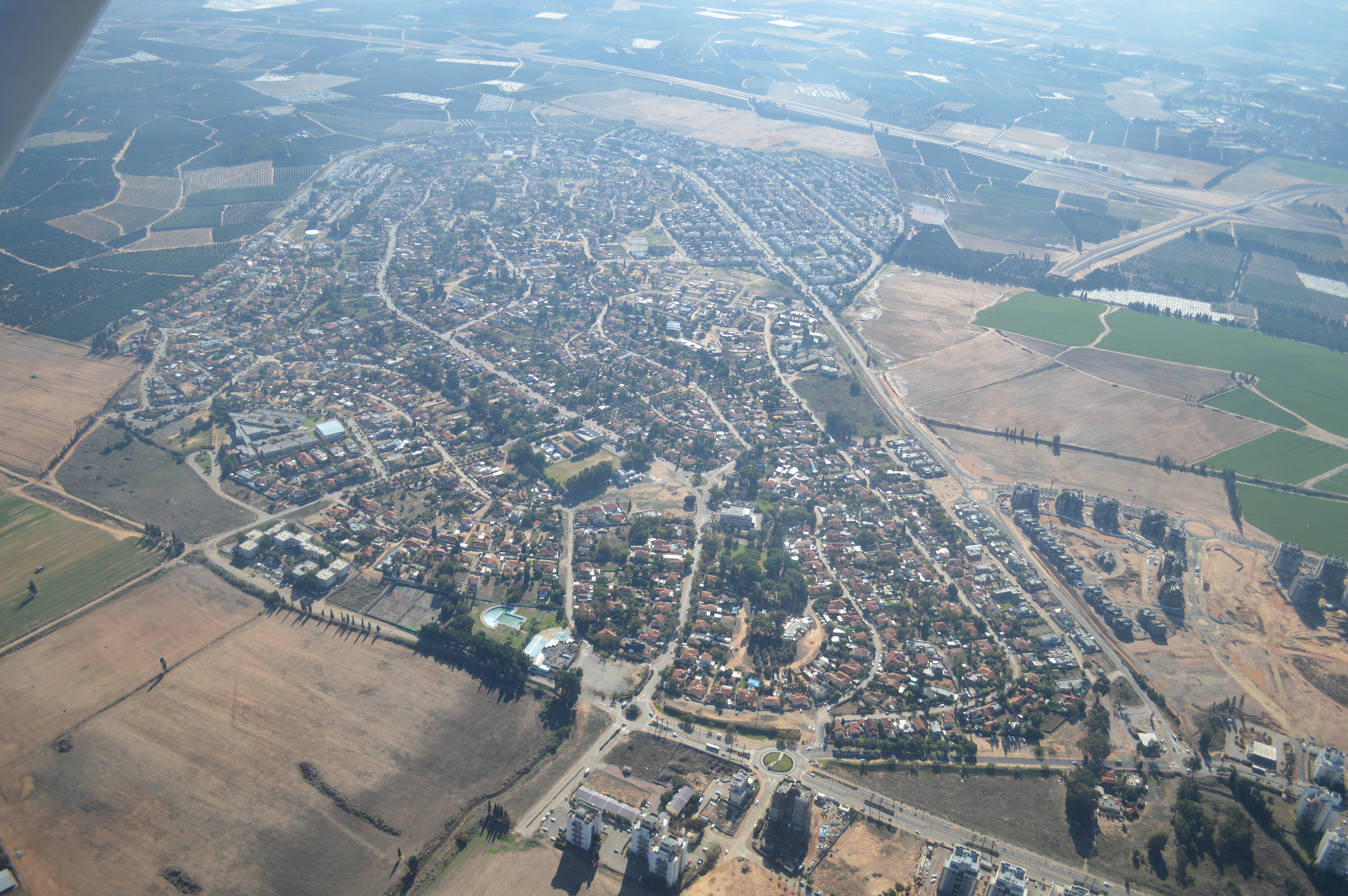
- Neighborhood of Hadera
- Interactive map of Hadera Natural Region
- Country: Israel
- District: Haifa
- Subdistrict: Hadera
- Largest City: Hadera

Area
  - Total: 235 km^{2} (91 sq mi)

Population (2024)
  - Total: 279,015

Ethnicity
  - Jews and others: 76.5%
  - Arabs: 22.0%

The Hadera Natural Region is a natural region in the Hadera Subdistrict, in the Haifa District of Israel. Hadera is the largest city in the natural region.

== Geography ==
Districts, Subdistricts and Natural Regions of the State of Israel, 2018

The natural region consists of the southern portion of the Haifa District, stretching from the Mediterranean coast to the Green Line, north of Netanya and south of Zikhron Ya'akov. It has an area of 235 km^{2}. The largest city in the natural region is Hadera, which contains 39 percent of the natural region's population. Other major towns in the natural region include Pardes Hanna-Karkur, Baqa al-Gharbiyye, and Binyamina-Giv'at Ada. The natural region contains portions of the Alona, Hof HaCarmel, and Menashe regional councils.

== Demographics ==
77 percent of the residents of the Hadera Natural Region are Jewish. 22 percent of residents are Arab, concentrated in the city of Baqa al-Gharbiyye and the local councils of Jatt and Jisr az-Zarqa.

Historical population
Year	Pop.	±%
1972	70,200	—
1983	87,600	+24.8%
1995	131,200	+49.8%
2008	199,460	+52.0%
2022	265,193	+33.0%
2024	279,015	+5.2%

== Administrative local authorities ==
Cities	Local Councils	Villages
Baqa al-Gharbiyye; Hadera; Or Akiva	Binyamina-Giv'at Ada; Jatt; Jisr az-Zarqa; Pardes Hanna-Karkur	Alona: Aviel; Hof HaCarmel: Beit Hanania; Caesarea; Sdot Yam; Menashe: Alonei Yitzhak; Barkai; Ein Iron; Ein Shemer; Gan HaShomron; Gan Shmuel; Kfar Glikson; Kfar Pines; Lehavot Haviva; Ma'anit; Magal; Ma'or; Metzer; Mishmarot; Sde Yitzhak; Sha'ar Menashe; Talmei Elazar

== Voting Patterns ==
In the 2022 election, 42 percent of voters in the natural region voted for the parties of the right-wing coalition led by Benjamin Netanyahu, while 41 percent voted for the parties of the center-left coalition led by Yair Lapid and 14 percent voted for the Arab parties.

In the 2026 election, 39.5 percent of voters in the natural region voted for the parties of the center-left coalition led by Gadi Eisenkot, while 35 percent voted for the parties of the right-wing coalition led by Benjamin Netanyahu and 21 percent voted for the Arab parties. An additional 3.1 percent voted for the Reservists, and 1.3 percent voted for Amcha Yisrael. Voter turnout increased 30 percent from the 2022 election.
