= Wadi Ara =

Valley in Israel

Coordinates: 32°29′38″N 35°3′16″E

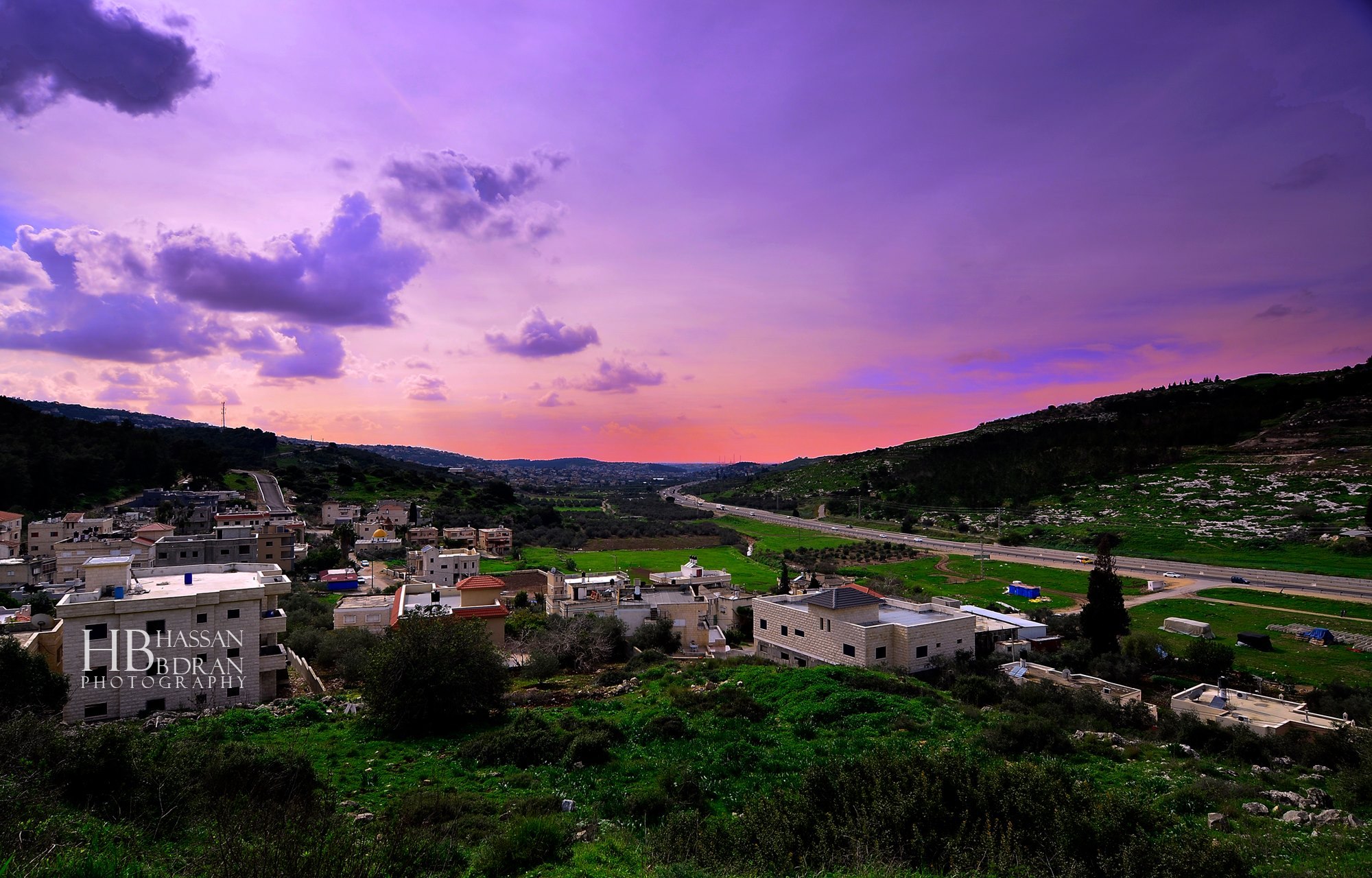
Wadi Ara

Wadi Ara (Arabic: وادي عارة; Hebrew: ואדי עארה) or Nahal 'Iron (Hebrew: נחל עירון), is a valley and its surrounding area in Israel populated mainly by Arab Israelis. The area is also known as the "Northern Triangle".

Wadi Ara is located northwest of the Green Line, in the Haifa District. Highway 65 runs through the wadi. The ancient town of biblical fame, Megiddo, known from Revelation 16:16 as Armageddon, used to guard its northern exit during much of the Bronze and Iron Ages.

== Geography ==
Wadi Ara is a 20 km wadi (valley) in northern Israel that begins at the meeting point of Samaria, the Menashe Heights, and the Sharon plain. The riverbed begins near Umm al-Fahm and runs southwest on the boundary between the Manasseh hills and the Umm al-Fahm hills. Approximately 1 km west of the Border Patrol intersection on Highway 65, the wadi opens into the Sharon plain, and becomes a tributary of the Hadera Stream, south of Talmei Elazar and north of Tel Zeror. Wadi Ara is contained mostly within the Alexander Mountain natural region of the Hadera Subdistrict.

== History ==
Wadi Ara is part of the ancient historical route Via Maris, connecting what is now the Israeli coastal plain with the Jezreel Valley and, in a wider sense, Egypt in the west with Syria and Mesopotamia in the east.

=== Chalcolithic ===
The site of En Esur has a main occupational level from the Early Chalcolithic period, when a large village with a temple stood at the well-watered site.

=== Early Bronze Age ===
Also at En Esur, a walled city covered the site during the Early Bronze Age, an exceptionally early and populous urban centre for the Southern Levant.

=== Late Bronze Age: Thutmose III ===
In the Late Bronze Age, the Egyptian king, Thutmose III (r. 1479-1425 BC), used the route, then called Aruna, to surprise his enemies, and take control of Megiddo. According to information from a stela from Armant, the king of Kadesh advanced his army to Megiddo. Thutmose III mustered his own army and departed Egypt, passing through the border fortress of Tjaru (Sile). Thutmose marched his troops through the coastal plain as far as Jamnia, then inland to Yehem, a small city near Megiddo. The ensuing Battle of Megiddo probably was the largest battle in any of Thutmose's seventeen campaigns. A ridge of mountains jutting inland from Mount Carmel stood between Thutmose and Megiddo, and he had three potential routes to take. The northern route and the southern route, both of which went around the mountain, were judged by his council of war to be the safest, but Thutmose, in an act of great bravery (or so he boasts, but such self-praise is normal in Egyptian texts), accused the council of cowardice and took a dangerous route through the Aruna mountain pass, which he alleged was only wide enough for the army to pass "horse after horse and man after man."

=== Ottoman period ===
Egyptians came in Wadi 'Ara as a result of waves of immigration during the first half of the 19th century, and the area currently features a number of villages with a substantial population of Egyptian descent.

=== 1948-49 war ===
Notables from Arab villages in Wadi Ara, subject to Israeli martial law, 1949

Captured by Iraqi Arab League forces under the command of Iraqi officer, Captain Khaleel Jassim, in the 1948 Arab–Israeli War, it was ceded to Israel in exchange for territory south of Hebron in the 1949 Israel-Jordan armistice agreement. In March 1949, as the Jordanian army replaced the Iraqi forces, three Israeli brigades moved into positions in Operation Shin-Tav-Shin. Following the operation, Israel renegotiated the ceasefire line in the Wadi Ara area of the Northern West Bank in an agreement reached on 23 March 1949 and incorporated into the General Armistice Agreement. These 15 villages were ceded to Israel.

== Educational institutions ==
Hand in Hand – Bridge over the Wadi is a bilingual Hebrew-Arabic school located in an Arab village in Wadi Ara. It was established in 2004 with 100 students in kindergarten through third grade. In 2008, classes were offered up to sixth grade and enrollment increased to 200, split evenly between Arabs and Jews.

== Proposed land exchange ==
The area has come under political attention as some Israeli politicians such as Avigdor Lieberman of the Yisrael Beiteinu party have brought up transferring the area to the sovereignty and administration of the Palestinian Authority for a future Palestinian state. In return the Palestinian Authority would transfer specific large Israeli settlement "blocs" within the West Bank east of the Green Line to Israel. According to politicians who support this land-swap, Israel would ensure and secure itself as a primarily Jewish state. However, many politicians within the Knesset disagree and believe it would only decrease Israel's Arab population by a mere 10%, while most Israeli Arabs object to trading Israeli citizenship for Palestinian citizenship.

== Localities in Wadi Ara ==
=== Arab ===
- Aqqada
- Ar'ara ('Ara included in municipal borders)
- al-Arian
- Baqa al-Gharbiyye
- Basma (merger of Barta'a West, Ein as-Sahala, and Muawiya)
- Buweishat
- al-Byar
- Dar al-Hanoun
- Ein Ibrahim
- Jatt
- Kafr Qara
- Khor Saqr
- Ma'ale Iron (Baiyada, Musmus, Zalafa, Musheirifa, Salim)
- Meiser
- Muallaqa
- Murtafi'a
- al-Shari'ah
- Umm al-Fahm
- Umm al-Qutuf
- Zemer

=== Jewish ===
- Barkai
- Ein Iron
- Gan HaShomron
- Givat Oz
- Harish
- Katzir
- Ma'anit
- Magal
- Maor
- Mei Ami
- Metzer

=== Historical localities ===
==== Ancient ====
- El-Ahwat, possibly the site of biblical Harosheth Haggoyim, a Canaanite fortress and archaeological site
- 'En Esur – Large Chalcolithic village and Early Bronze Age city, Israel

==== Pre-1948 Palestine ====
- Wadi Ara, Haifa

== See also ==
- Egged bus 841 massacre
- Menashe Regional Council
- Triangle (Israel)
