= Alexander Mountain Natural Region =

Coordinates: 32°31′03″N 35°09′14″E

- Natural Region
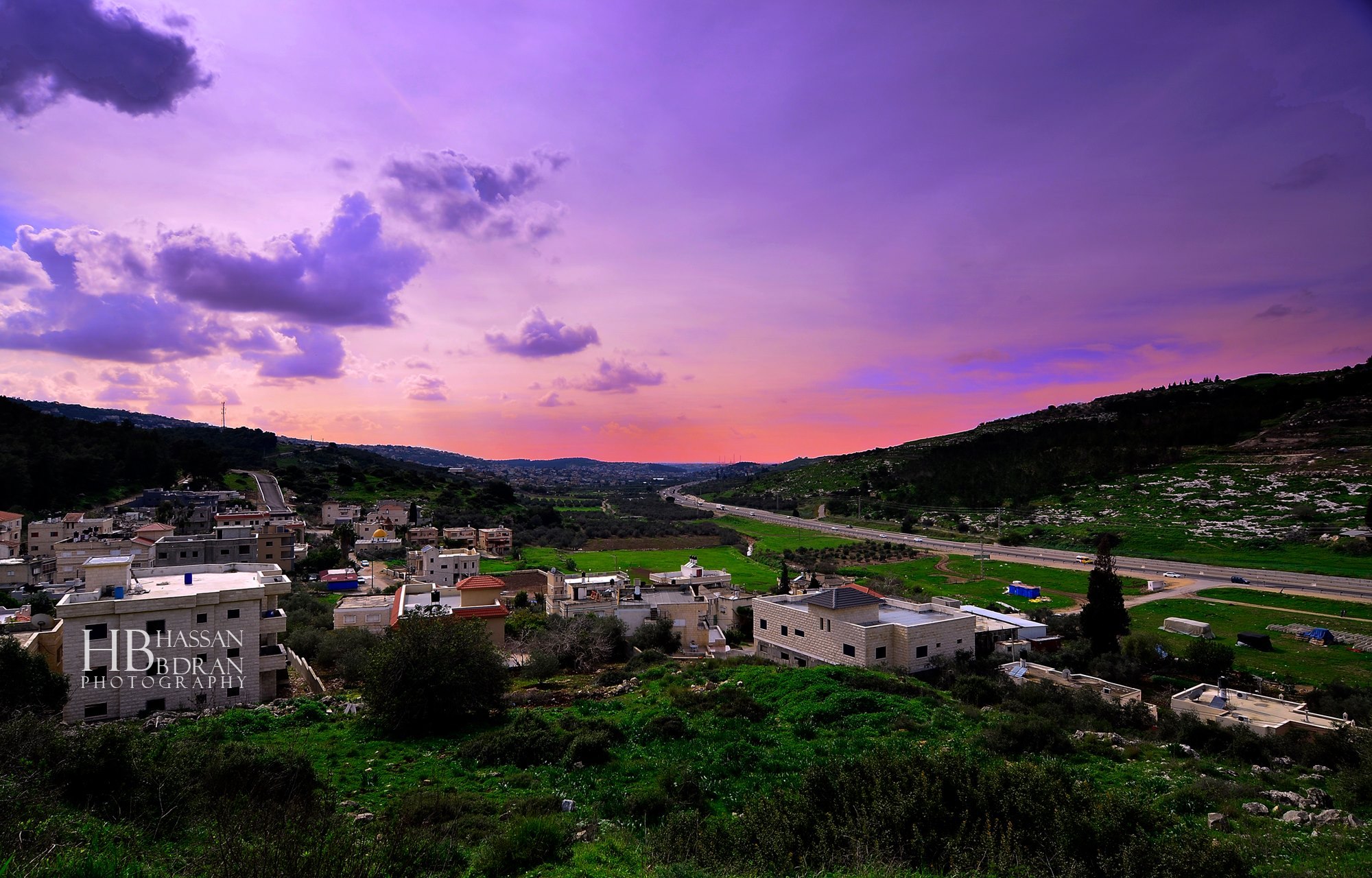
- View of Wadi Ara
- Interactive map of Alexander Mountain Natural Region
- Country: Israel
- District: Haifa
- Subdistrict: Hadera
- Largest City: Umm al-Fahm

Area
  - Total: 126 km^{2} (49 sq mi)

Population (2024)
  - Total: 180,516

Ethnicity
  - Jews and others: 25.8%
  - Arabs: 73.9%

The Alexander Mountain Natural Region is a natural region in the Hadera Subdistrict, in the Haifa District of Israel. Umm al-Fahm is the largest city in the natural region.

== Geography ==
Districts, Subdistricts and Natural Regions of the State of Israel, 2018

The natural region consists of the Wadi Ara valley, south of Mount Carmel between Hadera and Afula. It also contains a few towns to the northwest of Wadi Ara, that don't fit neatly into any other geographic region. It has an area of 126 km^{2}. It is named after Alexander Mountain (Har Alexander in Hebrew), a 518m (1,700ft) mountain in Umm al-Fahm near the Green Line which overlooks Wadi Ara, and which was named after either Sheikh Iskander, a saint whose tomb stands at the top of the mountain, or Alexander Jannaeus, a king of the Hasmonean Kingdom.

== Demographics ==
74 percent of the residents of the Alexander Mountain Natural Region are Arab. 26 percent of residents are Jewish, concentrated in the city of Harish and a half-dozen small towns. The largest city in the natural region is Umm al-Fahm, which contains 33 percent of the natural region's population. Several other major towns are located here, including Harish, Kafr Qara, and Ar'ara.

Historical population
Year	Pop.	±%
1972	24,000	—
1983	34,000	+41.7%
1995	56,800	+67.1%
2008	109,680	+93.1%
2022	164,450	+49.9%
2024	180,516	+9.8%

== Administrative local authorities ==
Cities	Local Councils	Villages
Harish; Umm al-Fahm	Ar'ara; Basma; Kafr Qara; Ma'ale Iron	Alona: Amikam; Giv'at Nili; Menashe: al-Arian; Katzir; Mei Ami; Meiser; Mitzpe Ilan; Regavim; Umm al-Qutuf

== Politics ==
The natural region contains portions of the Alona and Menashe regional councils.

In the 2022 election, 69 percent of voters in the natural region voted for the Arab parties, while 17 percent voted for the parties of the right-wing coalition led by Benjamin Netanyahu and 12 percent voted for the parties of the center-left coalition led by Yair Lapid.

In the 2026 election, 77 percent of voters in the natural region voted for the Arab parties, while 12 percent voted for the parties of the right-wing coalition led by Benjamin Netanyahu, and 9 percent voted for the parties of the center-left coalition led by Gadi Eisenkot (the smallest percentage of any natural region in Israel). An additional 0.9 percent voted for the Reservists, and 0.5 percent voted for Amcha Yisrael. Voter turnout increased 77 percent from the 2022 election.
