= Kfar Pines =

Moshav in northern Israel

Kfar Pines: כְּפַר פִּינֶס (Hebrew)
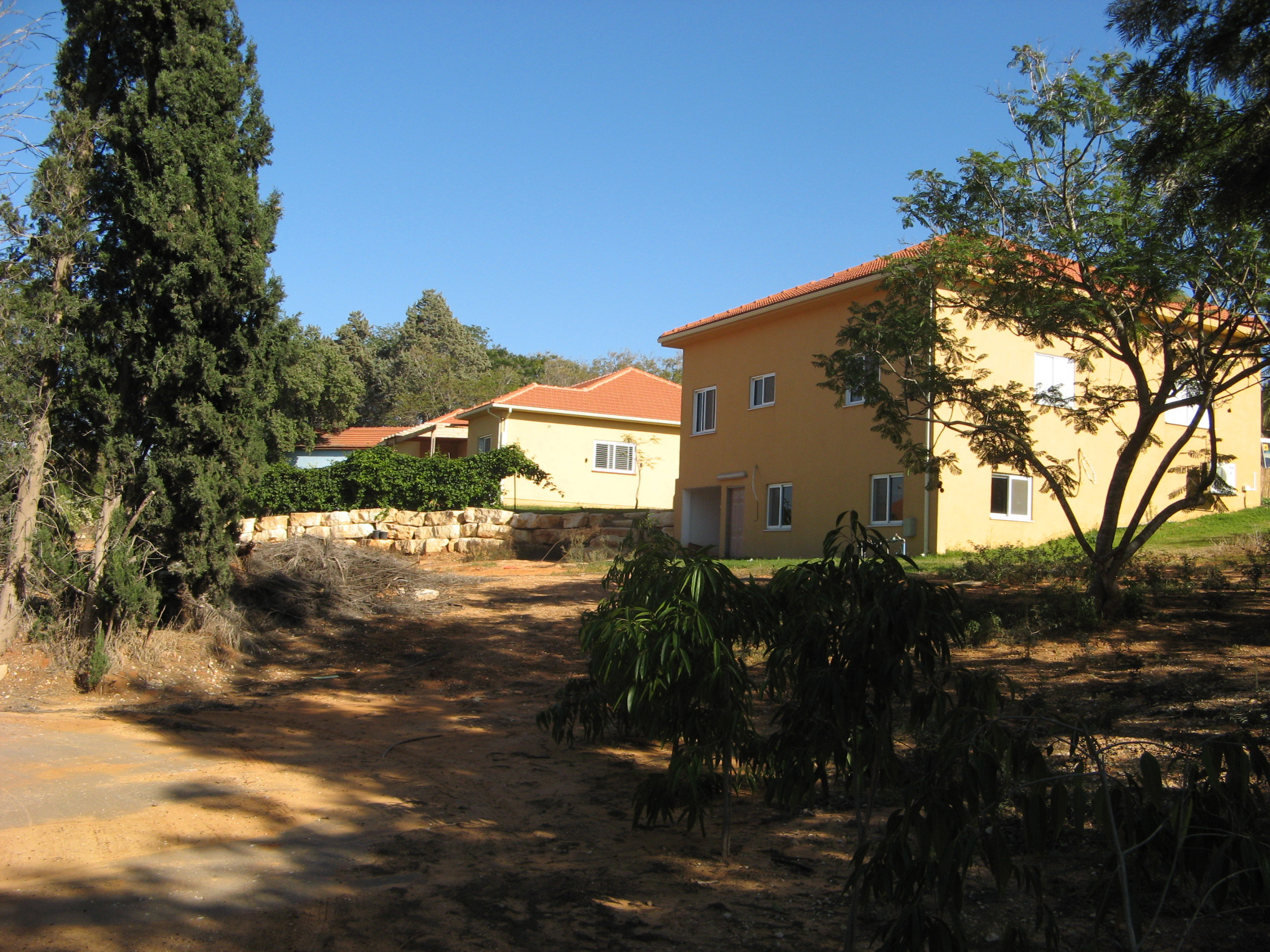
- Etymology: Pines' Village
- Location within Haifa region of Israel Location within Israel
- Coordinates: 32°29′2″N 35°0′10″E
- Country: Israel
- District: Haifa
- Subdistrict: Hadera
- Council: Menashe
- Affiliation: Hapoel HaMizrachi
- Founded: 1933
- Founder: Eastern European immigrants
- Population (2024): 691

Kfar Pines (Hebrew: כְּפַר פִּינֶס, lit. 'Pines Village') is a religious moshav in northern Israel. Located to the north-east of Hadera, adjacent to Pardes Hanna-Karkur and Ein Iron, it falls under the jurisdiction of Menashe Regional Council. In 2024 it had a population of 691.

== History ==
The village, named after the author Rabbi Yehiel Michel Pines, was established in 1933 by Kvutzas Avraham (Hebrew: he:קבוצת אברהם, lit. 'The Avraham Group'), a group of Jewish immigrants from eastern Europe, that was affiliated with the Hapoel HaMizrachi political party.

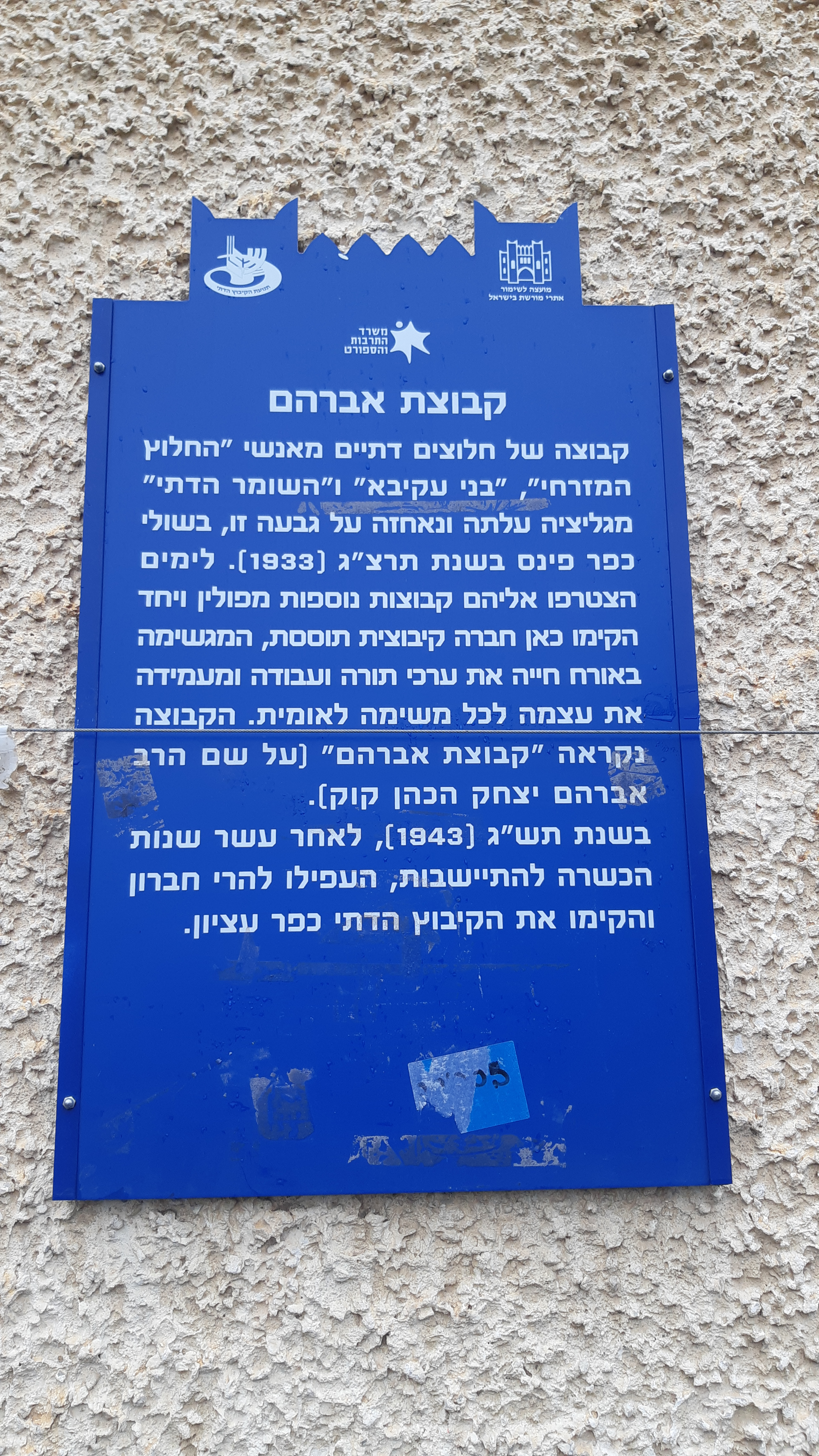
History of Kfar Pines' founding by the Avraham Group

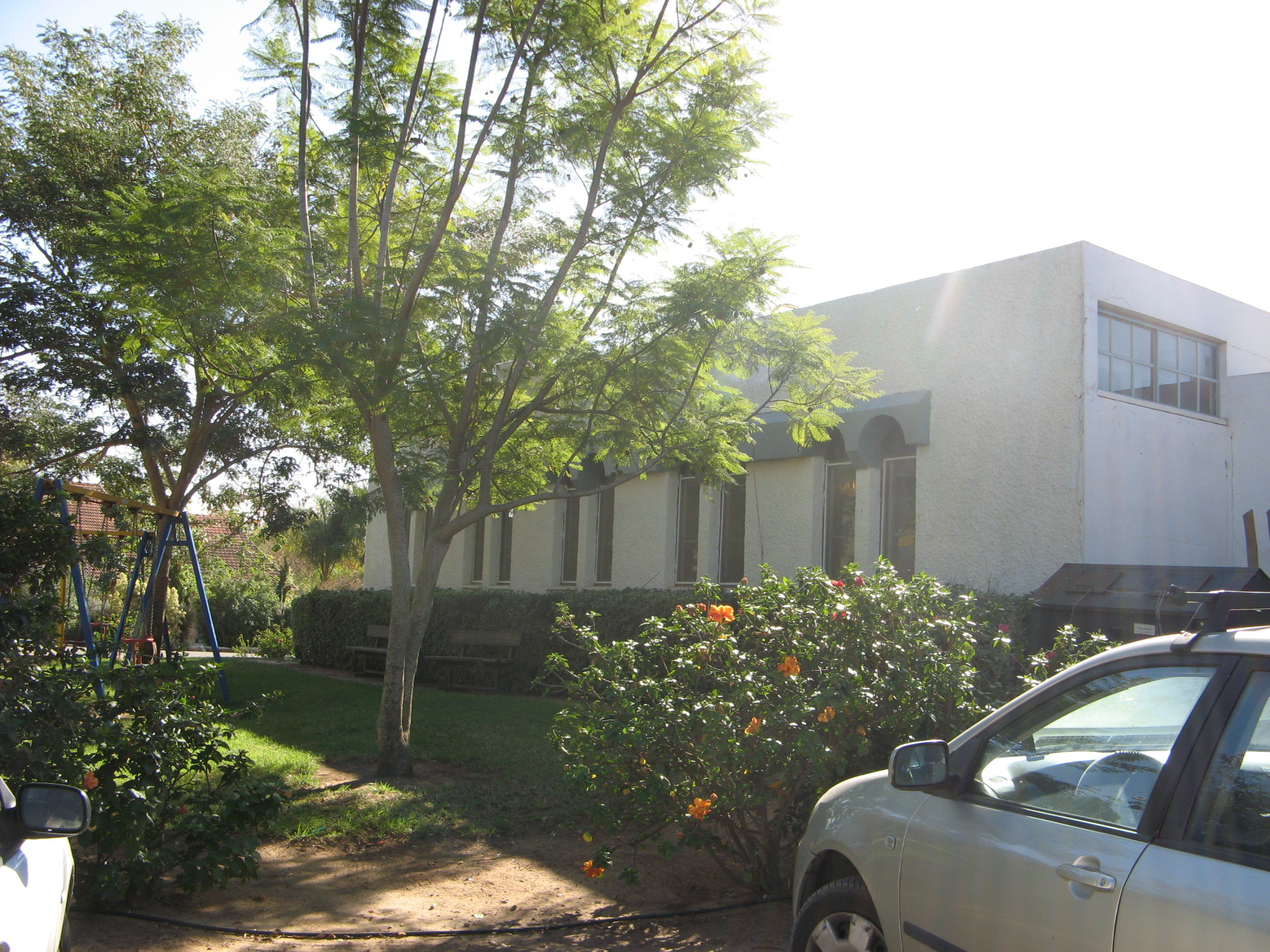
Community Synagogue in Kfar Pines

== Education ==
The first ulpana in Israel, a religious girls high school, was opened in Kfar Pines in 1960. It was opened under the encouragement & support of Rabbi Moshe-Zvi Neria and was affiliated with the Bnei Akiva youth movement. Named "Ulpana Ramat Karniel" (Karniel's height) or "Ulpana Kfar Pines", it is also called "Em HaUlpenot" (mother of all ulpenas אם האולפנות) due to it being the first Ulpana in Israel. In a typical school year, the Ulpana has nearly 650 girls from 100 different locations throughout Israel. There are also tailor made programs for immigrant students form Russia, South Africa, and Ethiopia. Ulpana Kfar Pines is one of two Israeli high schools to lead the list for high school diploma eligibility, with 100% of students being eligible.

Kfar Pines's Educational Institutions include Ulpana Kfar Pines; the High School in Hadera; the Ulpanit in Or Akiva; Dror Boys School, the Kfar HaRoeh Yeshiva; and the YBA Ulpanit in Or Akiva.

== Economy ==
Rikmat Elimelech (founded in 1949) is a designer and producer of hand-woven and embroidered Judaica.

== Notable people ==
- Hanan Porat (born 1943), Rabbi, educator, and politician who served in the Knesset
