= Mishmarot =

Kibbutz in north-central Israel

Mishmarot: מִשְׁמָרוֹת (Hebrew)
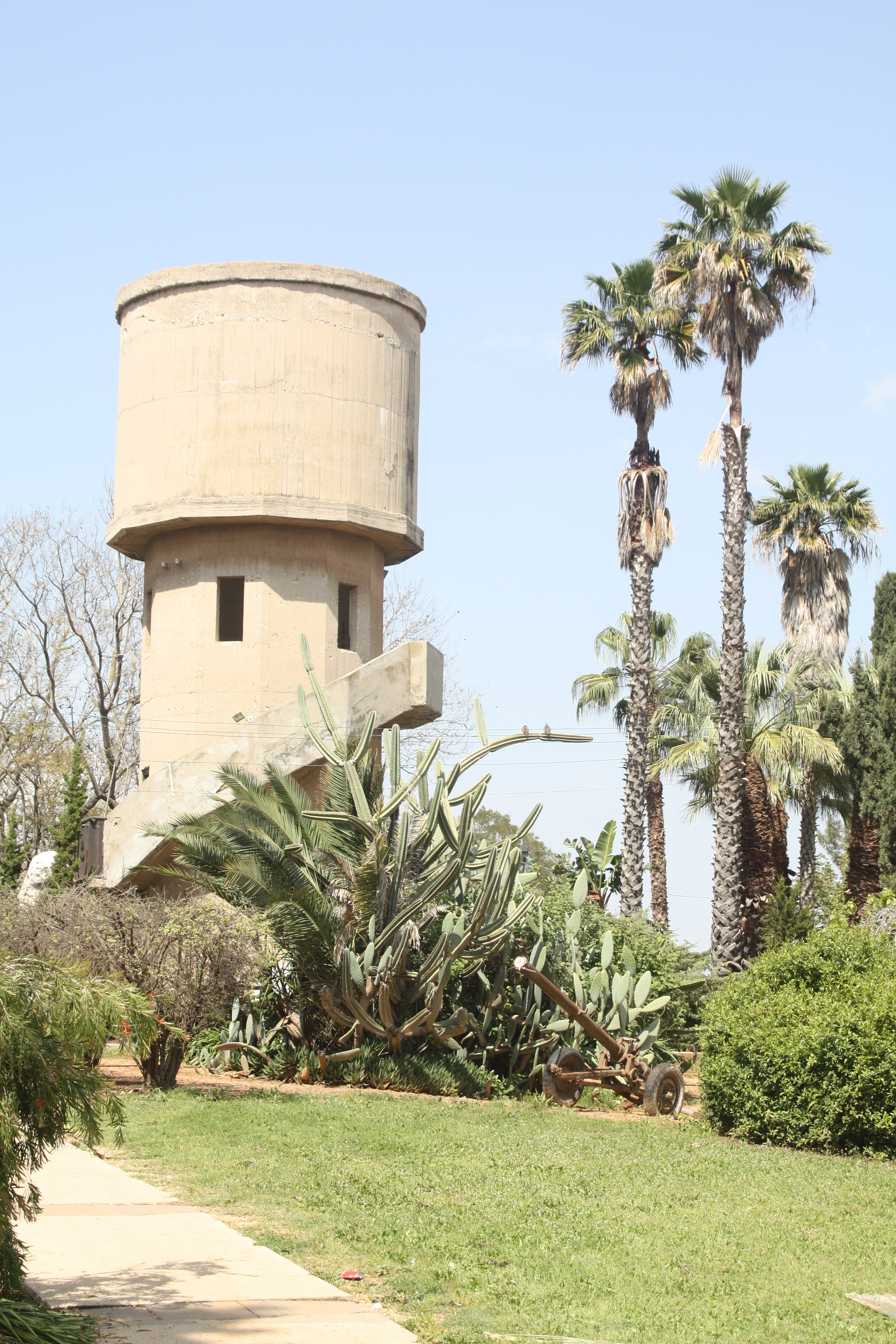

- Location within Haifa region of Israel Location within Israel
- Coordinates: 32°29′10″N 34°59′1″E
- Country: Israel
- District: Haifa
- Subdistrict: Hadera
- Council: Menashe
- Affiliation: Kibbutz Movement
- Founded: October 1933
- Founder: Latvian, Lithuanian and Soviet Jews
- Population (2024): 1,363

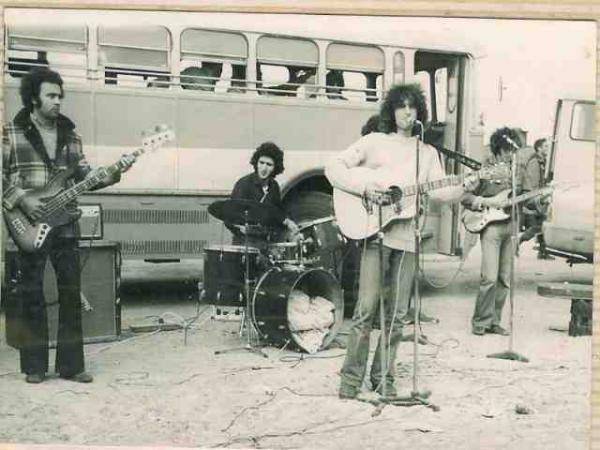
Shalom Hanoch at the microphone, performing for soldiers during the Yom Kippur War (1973)

Mishmarot (Hebrew: מִשְׁמָרוֹת) is a kibbutz in north-central Israel near the town of Pardes Hanna-Karkur. Located about 50 m above sea level and close to the villages Ein Shemer and Kfar Glickson, it falls under the jurisdiction of Menashe Regional Council. In 2024 it had a population of 1,363.

== History ==
The village was founded in October 1933, during Sukkot, by immigrants from the Soviet Union, Lithuania and Latvia, on Jewish National Fund land, under the auspices of Keren HaYesod. Its name comes from the farm in the Crimea in which the founders trained, called Mishmar (lit. guard shift, 'mishmarot' being its plural form). Notable former residents include the musicians Shalom Hanoch and Meir Ariel.

Before the founding of the State of Israel, Mishmarot was home to secret Fosh and Military Industries bases.
