= Sha'ar Menashe =

- Location within Haifa region of Israel
- Coordinates: 32°27′0″N 35°1′0″E
- Country: Israel
- District: Haifa
- Subdistrict: Hadera
- Council: Menashe
- Founded: 1949
- Population (2024): 523
- Website: shaar-menashe.org

Sha'ar Menashe (Hebrew: שַׁעַר מְנַשֶּׁה, lit. 'Menashe Gate') is a psychiatric medical centre in northern Israel. Located near Pardes Hanna-Karkur with an area of 740 dunams, it falls under the jurisdiction of Menashe Regional Council. In 2024 it had a population of 523. It is the location of Sha'ar Menashe psychiatric hospital.

The medical center operates under the Israeli Ministry of Health and serves as a major psychiatric facility for the Hadera sub-district and northern Israel. The campus comprises several specialized treatment frameworks, including active acute wards, open and closed psychiatric departments, psychogeriatric wards, and dedicated rehabilitation units designed to assist patients in transitioning back into the community. In addition to inpatient services, Sha'ar Menashe offers multidisciplinary outpatient clinics that utilize a bio-psycho-social treatment model, combining biological psychiatry, clinical psychology, social work, art therapy, and occupational therapy.

== History ==
In the past after 1949 there was here a camp for first absorption of immigrants from Yemen and Iraq and a village for elderly people. In 2007 the hospital had in treatment 1,100 patients and was the largest psychiatric institution in Israel.

The facility's origins date back to the late 1940s, when the "Sha'ar Menashe" immigrant camp (Ma'abara) was established on an area of approximately 740 dunams, initially serving as a primary absorption center for Jewish immigrants arriving from Yemen and Iraq. In 1951, the Joint Distribution Committee (JDC) converted the site into a "village for the elderly and infirm" (Malben), which operated until 1961. During that year, ownership of the compound was transferred to the Israeli government, which formally repurposed the infrastructure into a specialized psychiatric hospital to address national mental health needs.

In subsequent decades, the institution expanded significantly. By 2024, the administrative management of the Sha'ar Menashe Mental Health Center was unified with the nearby Hillel Yaffe Medical Center in Hadera, operating under a joint directorship.

== Maximum Security and Forensic Division ==
Sha'ar Menashe houses Israel's specialized Maximum Security and Forensic Psychiatry Division, which stands as a unique national framework within the country's public mental health system. This highly secured division comprises four dedicated wards with a total capacity of 128 male patients who exhibit extreme levels of violent behavior. The facility admits individuals under two primary categories: patients subject to court-mandated hospitalization orders following criminal offenses committed during acute psychotic states, and individuals transferred from other psychiatric institutions across Israel that are unequipped to manage severe aggression.

Due to the high-risk nature of the division, the facilities incorporate reinforced security measures, including heavily fortified perimeters, bolted furniture, and an increased security presence. The multi-professional staff includes psychiatrists, criminologists, specialized nurses, and psychologists who develop behavioral regulation and clinical intervention methods aimed at stabilizing long-term patients. The division also features an innovative psychiatric rehabilitation unit designed to provide a gradual, controlled transition for forensic patients preparing to re-enter society.
