= Ma'anit =

Kibbutz in Northern Israel

Ma'anit: מַעֲנִית (Hebrew)
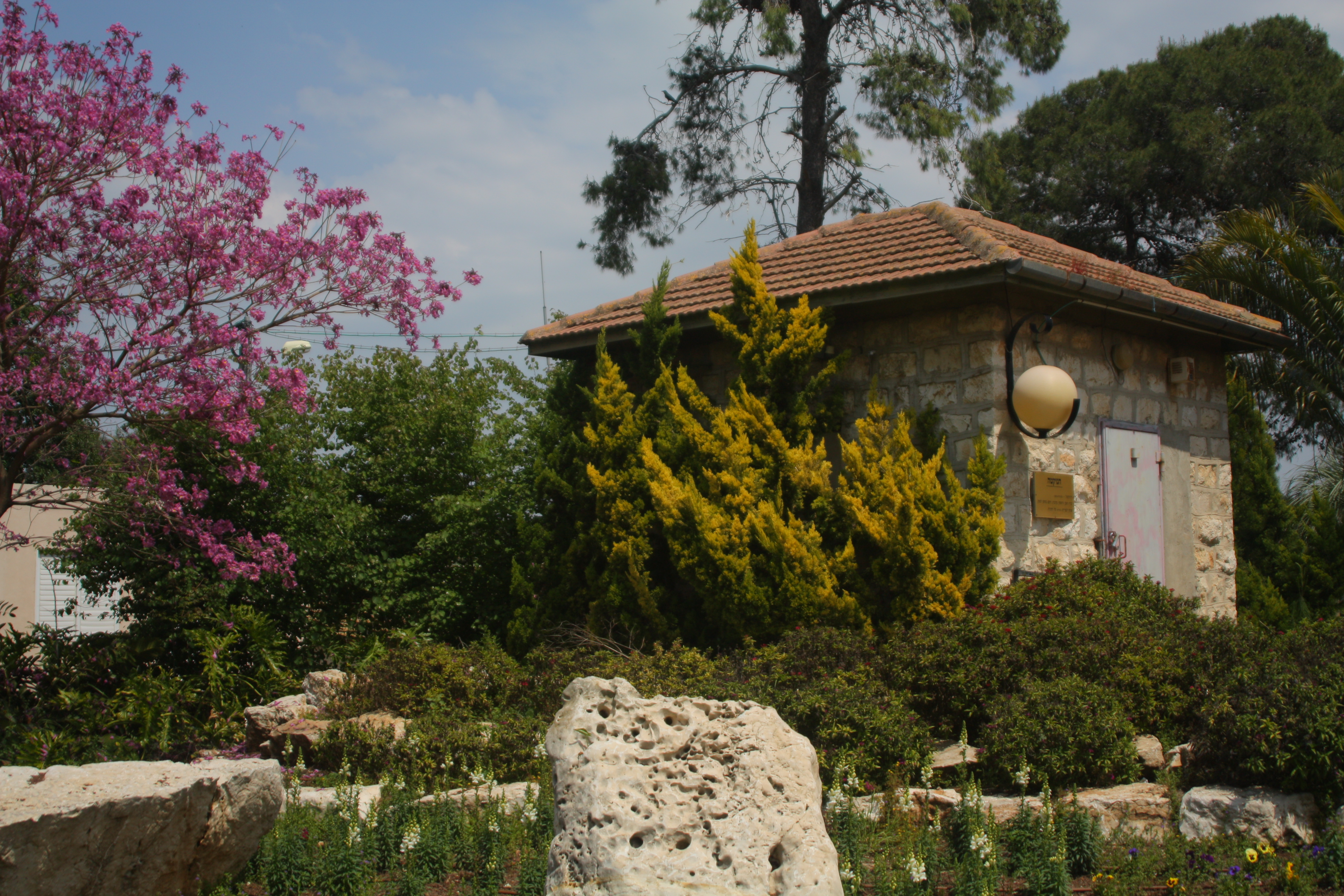

- Location within Haifa region of Israel
- Coordinates: 32°27′00″N 35°02′00″E
- Country: Israel
- District: Haifa
- Subdistrict: Hadera
- Council: Menashe
- Affiliation: Kibbutz Movement
- Founded: 1942
- Founder: Czechoslovak and Polish Hashomer Hatzair members
- Population (2024): 951

Ma'anit (Hebrew: מַעֲנִית) is a kibbutz in northern Israel. Located just south of the town of Pardes Hanna-Karkur, it falls under the jurisdiction of Menashe Regional Council. In 2024 it had a population of 951.

== History ==
The kibbutz was established in 1942 by members of the Hashomer Hatzair movement who fled from Czechoslovakia and Poland, with some arriving during Aliyah Bet, during Nazi persecution. Its name refers to the first furrow ploughed in a field. The analogy was presented in Avraham Herzfeld's speech about settlement in the area: He saw the establishment of the kibbutz as being the first of many. Due to its location near Wadi Ara, the kibbutz was on the front line during the 1948 Arab–Israeli War and was attacked by the Iraqi Army.

== Economy ==
Galam Ltd., a company that produces starch and glucose for the food industry, is based in Kibbutz Ma'anit. In 2010, Galam recorded annual sales of $137.6 million, half of it from export. After developing a new natural sweetener derived from the stevia plant, the company signed a contract with Corn Products International, which grows and processes stevia in South Africa.
