= Baruch Kimmerling =

Israeli sociologist and historian (1939–2007)

- ברוך קימרלינג
- Born: 16 October 1939; Turda
- Died: 20 May 2007
- Burial place: Kibbutz Mishmarot
- Spouse: Diana Aidan
- Children: 3

Academic background
- Education: Hebrew University of Jerusalem

Academic work
- Discipline: Sociology
- School or tradition: New Historians

Baruch Kimmerling (Hebrew: ברוך קימרלינג; 16 October 1939 – 20 May 2007) was an Israeli scholar and professor of sociology at the Hebrew University of Jerusalem. Upon his death in 2007, The Times described him as "the first academic to use scholarship to reexamine the founding tenets of Zionism and the Israeli State". Though a sociologist by training, Kimmerling was associated with the New Historians, a group of Israeli scholars who question the official narrative of Israel's creation.

== Biography ==
Baruch Kimmerling was born in the Transylvanian town of Turda, Romania in 1939. He was born with cerebral palsy, a developmental disability which left him using a wheelchair for the last three decades of his life. His family narrowly avoided the Holocaust by escaping from Turda in a Romani wagon in 1944, after rumors of the imminent deportation of the Jews began circulating. During the journey, the wagon was strafed by a German plane. When the Kimmerling family returned to Turda after the war had ended, they discovered their property was gone. The family immigrated to Israel in 1952, and took up residence in a ma'abara (immigrants' camp), Sha'ar ha-Aliya, before moving to a small apartment on the outskirts of Netanya.

Despite his significant disabilities, which caused Kimmerling to experience motor difficulties and speech problems, his parents raised him as a typical child and encouraged him to strive high. Exempt from conscription into the Israel Defense Forces, Kimmerling enrolled in the Hebrew University of Jerusalem in 1963, and obtained his PhD in 1973 as a sociologist. Kimmerling was known for his work analyzing pre-1948 Jewish settlement in Palestine in terms of colonialism. He lectured widely and wrote nine books and hundreds of essays. He also wrote numerous newspaper articles, in venues such as Haaretz and The Nation. He held a chair at the University of Toronto.

In August 1975, he married Diana Aidan, a Libyan-born immigrant from Italy who had moved to Israel from Naples in 1967, and was a doctoral student under Professor Yeshayahu Leibowitz. She gave up her professional career to become a homemaker. The couple had three children.

Kimmerling was an outspoken critic of Israeli policies, and spoke out on issues related to the Arab-Israeli conflict. He was dubbed one of Israel's New Historians, and himself insisted that he was a patriotic Zionist dedicated to celebrating the diversities of cultures within Israel, and to the ideals of a secular state. Kimmerling was an atheist, and lamented the inability of Jews and Arabs to "separate religion from nationality." Unlike some critics of Israeli policy, he publicly opposed the proposed boycott of Israeli academics by the Association of University Teachers in the United Kingdom, arguing that it would "weaken the last public sphere of free thinking and free speech in Israel."

Kimmerling died at the age of 67 after a long battle with cancer. He was buried in the secular cemetery at Kibbutz Mishmarot, leaving his wife, Diana Aidan, and three children.

== Major publications ==
1. Zionism and Territory: The Socioterritorial Dimensions of Zionist Politics. Berkeley: University of California, Institute of International Studies, 1983, 289 pages.
2. Zionism and Economy. Cambridge, Massachusetts: Schenkman Publishing Company, 1983, 169 pages.
3. The Interrupted System: Israeli Civilians in War and Routine Times. New Brunswick and London: Transaction Books, 1985. [229 pages]
4. (As editor) The Israeli State and Society: Boundaries and Frontiers. Albany: State University of New York Press, 1989, 330 pages
5. Baruch Kimmerling and Joel S. Migdal, Palestinians: The Making of a People. New York: Free Press, 1993, 396 pages. Paperback enlarged edition: Harvard University Press. Italian version: La Nuova Italia Editrice, 1994. Enlarged Edition, 2002 [page 512]. Enlarged and revised Hebrew version: Keter, 1998, 300 pages. Arabic: Ramallah, 2001.
6. The End of Ashkenazi Hegemony. Jerusalem: Keter, 2001, 124 pages (Hebrew).
7. The Invention and Decline of Israeliness: State, Culture and Military in Israel. Los Angeles and Berkeley: University of California Press, 2001, 268 pages.
8. Politicide: Sharon's War Against the Palestinians. London: Verso, 2003.
9. Baruch Kimmerling and Joel S. Migdal, The Palestinian People: A History. Cambridge, Massachusetts: Harvard University Press, 2003, 604 pages.
10. Immigrants, Settlers, Natives: Israel Between Plurality of Cultures and Cultural Wars. Tel Aviv: Am Oved, 2004 (Hebrew, 630 pages).
11. Sociology of Politics: A Reader. Binyamina: The Open University, 2005 (Hebrew)
12. Shuli bamerkaz: Sippur hayyim shel sotziolog tzibburi (Marginal in the Center: The Autobiography of a Public Sociologist), Hakibbutz Hameuhad, 2007, 252 pages, (Hebrew)
13. Clash of Identities: Explorations in Israeli and Palestinian Societies, New York: Columbia University Press, 2008, 431 pages.
14. Marginal at the Center: The Life Story of a Public Sociologist, Translated from the Hebrew by Diana Kimmerling, Oxford and New York: Berghahn Books, 2012, 258 pages.

== Reception ==
Saleh Abd al-Jawad, reviewing The Palestinian People: A History for the Institute for Palestine Studies, called Kimmerling "one of the most prominent post-Zionist sociologists in Israel". He concluded his review by saying that "A definitive appraisal of [the] book is difficult", citing the perceived omissions of relevant facts.
