= Magal (kibbutz) =

Magal: מַגָּל (Hebrew)
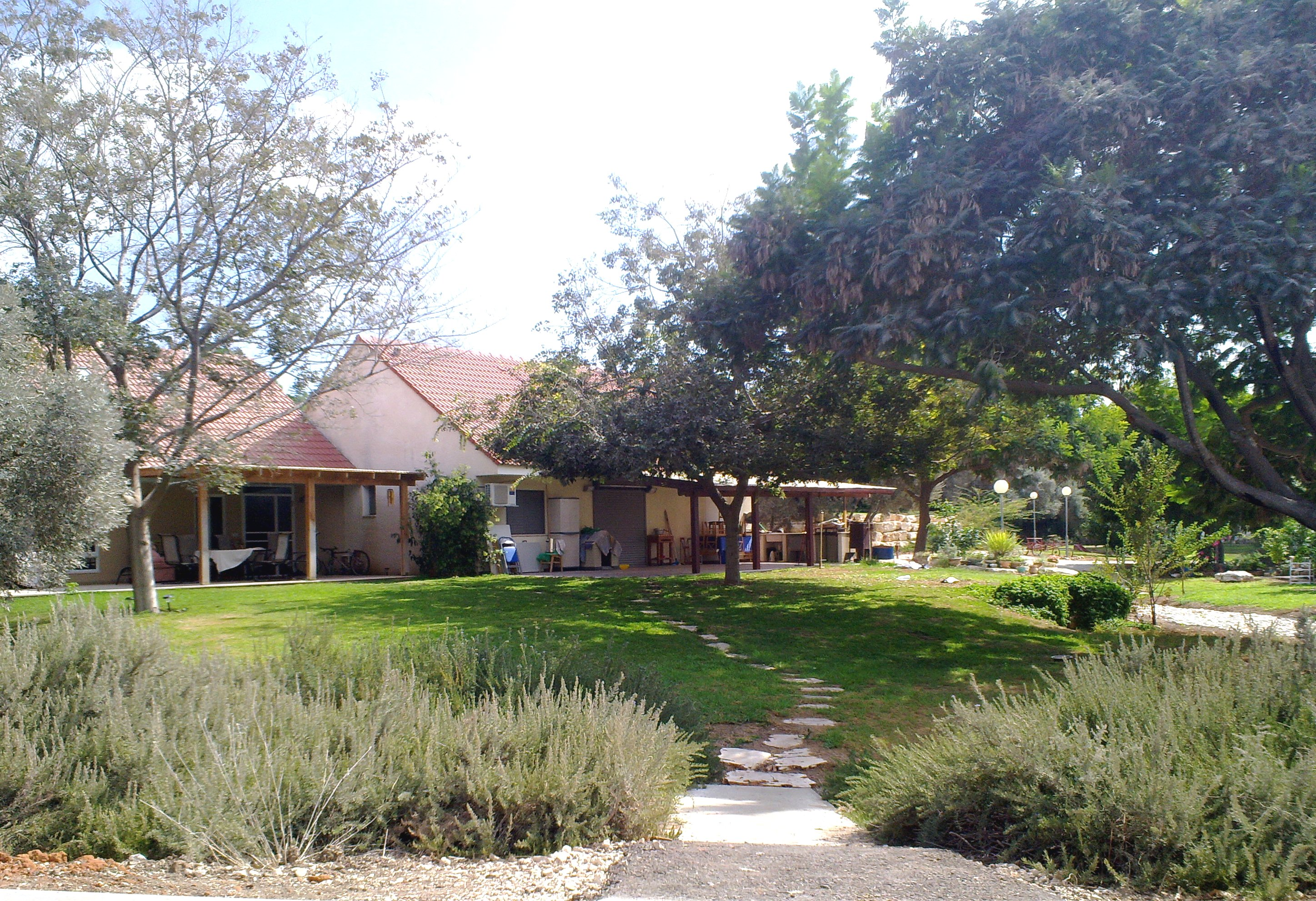
- Etymology: Sickle
- Location within Haifa region of Israel
- Coordinates: 32°23′8″N 35°2′8″E
- Country: Israel
- District: Haifa
- Subdistrict: Hadera
- Council: Menashe
- Affiliation: Kibbutz Movement
- Founded: 1953
- Founder: Nahal
- Population (2024): 1,404

Magal (Hebrew: מַגָּל, lit. Sickle) is a kibbutz in Israel. Located in the Wadi Ara region of the northern Sharon plain near the Green Line, it falls under the jurisdiction of Menashe Regional Council. In 2024 it had a population of 1,404. The kibbutz was named after the sickle on the Nahal's badge.

== History ==
Kibbutz Magal was founded in 1953 as a Nahal settlement on a hill overlooking the Samaria hills and what was then the border with Jordan. The kibbutz sits on a hill known from the War of Independence as the "86th Regiment"—on any elevation of the hill above the sea level (86 meters). The kibbutz was founded by the Tzofim battalion, but when they left, Nahal members began to settle there, which continued to reach it until the 1980s.

In 2005, construction began on a new residential neighborhood on the outskirts of the kibbutz. The first stage of the project was completed in April 2009.

== Economy ==
In the past, the economy was based on citrus groves, avocado plantations and cotton and other field crops. Today the kibbutz grows olives, almonds and pomegranates. It also manufactures and markets olive oil and provides catering services. Since the 1970s, the kibbutz has been the co-owner of Netafim, now an international corporation for irrigation and dripping products. Since the late 1990s the kibbutz has been undergoing privatization. Today it is almost completely privatized and considered economically viable.
