= Umm al-Qutuf =

Arab village in northern Israel

Umm al-Qutuf: אֻם אל-קֻטוּף, אום אל-קוטוף (Hebrew); أمّ القـُطـُف (Arabic)
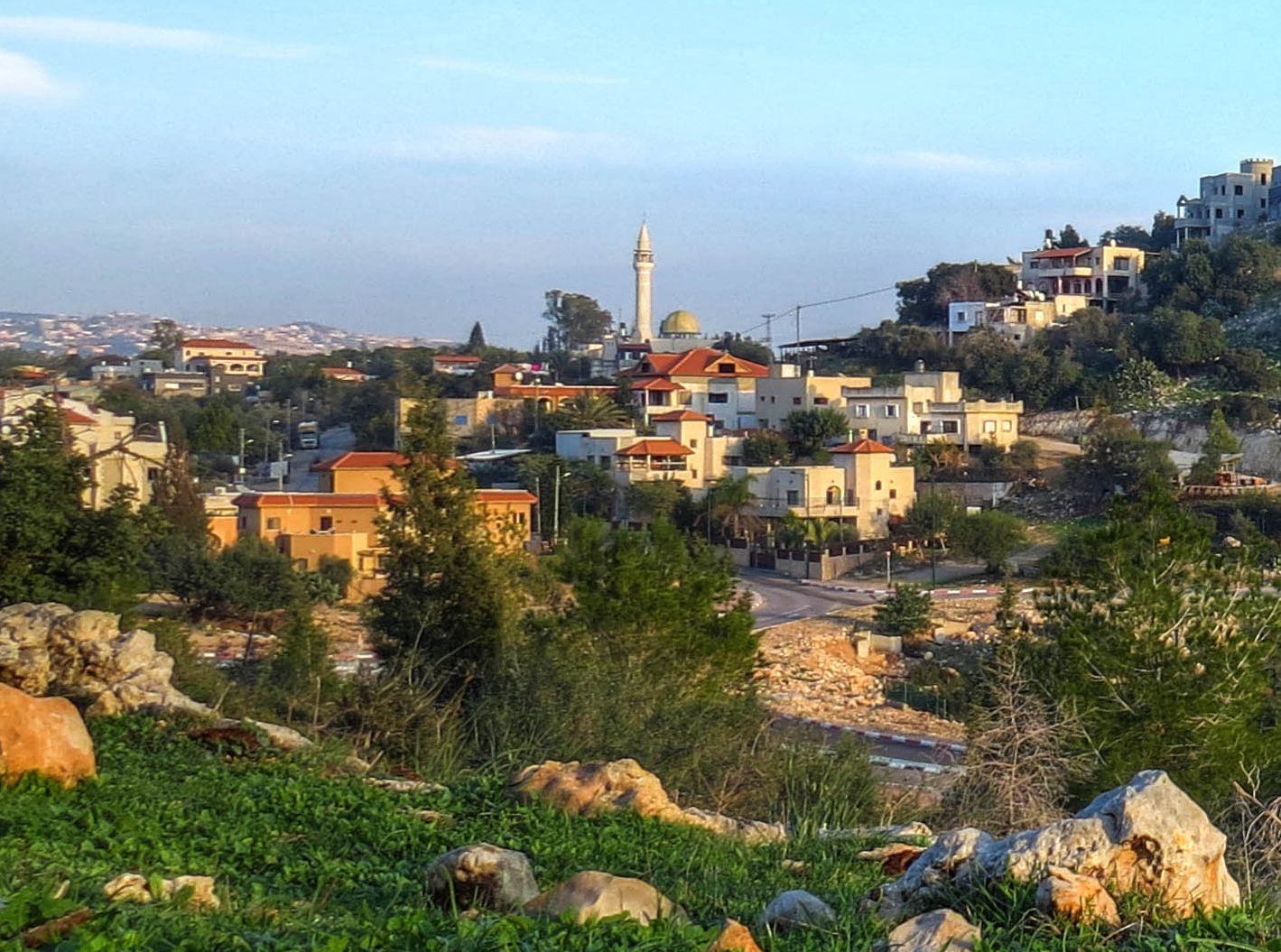
- Etymology: "The ruin with the St. John's-worts"
- Location within Haifa region of Israel Location within Israel
- Coordinates: 32°28′1″N 35°3′25″E
- Grid position: 155/208 PAL
- Country: Israel
- District: Haifa
- Subdistrict: Hadera
- Council: Menashe
- Population (2024): 1,259

Umm al-Qutuf (Arabic: أمّ القـُطـُف; Hebrew: אֻם אל-קֻטוּף) is an Arab village in northern Israel. Located in the Triangle, it falls under the jurisdiction of Menashe Regional Council. In 2024 it had a population of 1,259.

== History ==
Pottery remains from the Hellenistic, Roman, and Byzantine eras have been found here, as have pottery remains from the early Muslim and the Middle Ages.

In 1882, the PEF's Survey of Western Palestine (SWP) found at Kh. Umm el Kutuf only "ruined walls."

In the 1922 census of Palestine, conducted by the British Mandate authorities, Kherbet Umm al-Qatuf had a population of 11 Muslims.

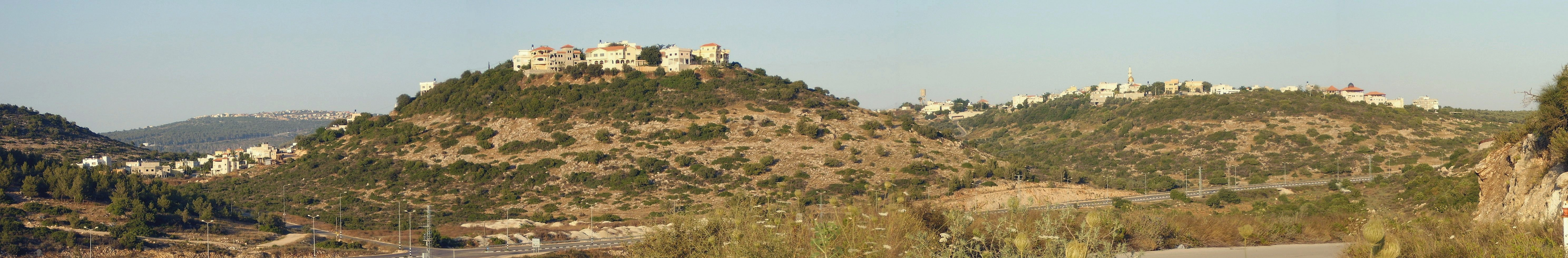
A panoramic view from west on Umm al-Qutuf (center) and Barta'a (right); the village on the far hill on the left is Qazir

== See also ==
- Arab localities in Israel

== Bibliography ==
- Barron, J.B., ed. (1923). Palestine: Report and General Abstracts of the Census of 1922. Government of Palestine.
- Conder, C.R.; Kitchener, H.H. (1882). The Survey of Western Palestine: Memoirs of the Topography, Orography, Hydrography, and Archaeology. Vol. 2. London: Committee of the Palestine Exploration Fund.
- Dauphin, C. (1998). La Palestine byzantine, Peuplement et Populations. BAR International Series 726 (in French). Vol. III : Catalogue. Oxford: Archeopress. ISBN 0-860549-05-4.
- Haddad, Elie (2012-03-22). "Umm el-Qutuf". Hadashot Arkheologiyot – Excavations and Surveys in Israel (124).
- Palmer, E.H. (1881). The Survey of Western Palestine: Arabic and English Name Lists Collected During the Survey by Lieutenants Conder and Kitchener, R. E. Transliterated and Explained by E.H. Palmer. Committee of the Palestine Exploration Fund.
- Zertal, A. (2016). The Manasseh Hill Country Survey. Vol. 3. Boston: BRILL. ISBN 978-9004312302.
