= Mei Ami =

Mei Ami: מֵי עַמִּי (Hebrew)
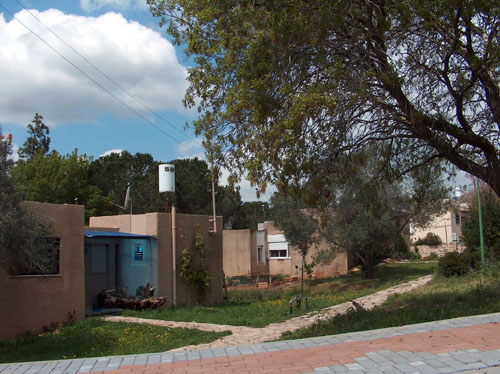

- Location within Haifa region of Israel
- Coordinates: 32°30′17″N 35°8′53″E
- Country: Israel
- District: Haifa
- Subdistrict: Hadera
- Council: Menashe
- Affiliation: HaOved HaTzioni
- Founded: 1963
- Founder: Nahal
- Population (2024): 430
- Website: www.mei-ami.co.il

Mei Ami (Hebrew: מֵי עַמִּי) is a moshav in northern Israel. Located near Wadi Ara around two kilometres south of Umm al-Fahm with an area of 3,500 dunams, it falls under the jurisdiction of Menashe Regional Council. In 2024 it had a population of 430.

== History ==
The village was established in 1963 as a Nahal settlement, and was civilianised in 1969, becoming a kibbutz. In 1971 it was converted to a moshav shitufi and in 2006 to a moshav ovdim. It is named after Miami, Florida, as the Jewish community in Miami, Florida helped with its establishment.
