= Al-Arian =

Arab village in northern Israel

al-Arian: אל עריאן (Hebrew); العريان (Arabic)
- Location within Haifa region of Israel Location within Israel
- Coordinates: 32°29′53″N 35°7′31″E
- Country: Israel
- District: Haifa
- Subdistrict: Hadera
- Council: Menashe
- Region: Wadi Ara
- Population (2024): 210

al-Arian (Arabic: العريان; Hebrew: אל עריאן) is an Arab village in northern Israel. Located in Wadi Ara, it falls under the jurisdiction of Menashe Regional Council. In 2024 it had a population of 210.

== See also ==
- Arab localities in Israel
