= Kfar Glikson =

Kfar Glikson: כְּפַר גְּלִיקְסוֹן (Hebrew)
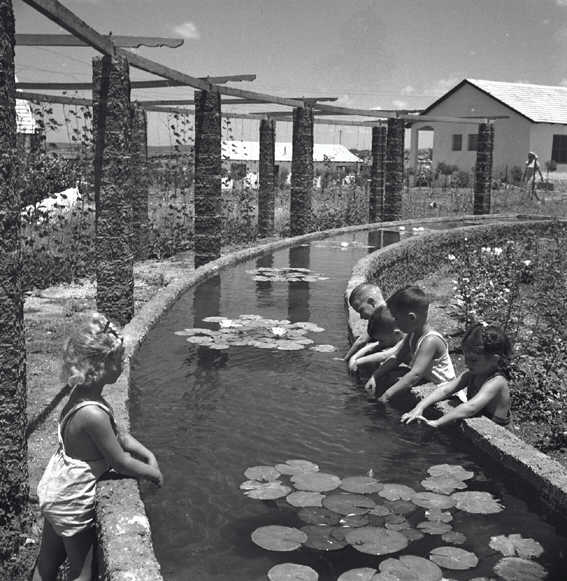
- Etymology: (Moshe) Glickson Village
- Location within Haifa region of Israel
- Coordinates: 32°30′19″N 35°0′20″E
- Country: Israel
- District: Haifa
- Subdistrict: Hadera
- Council: Menashe
- Affiliation: HaOved HaTzioni
- Founded: 23 May 1939
- Founder: Romanian Jews
- Population (2024): 394
- Website: glikson.co.il

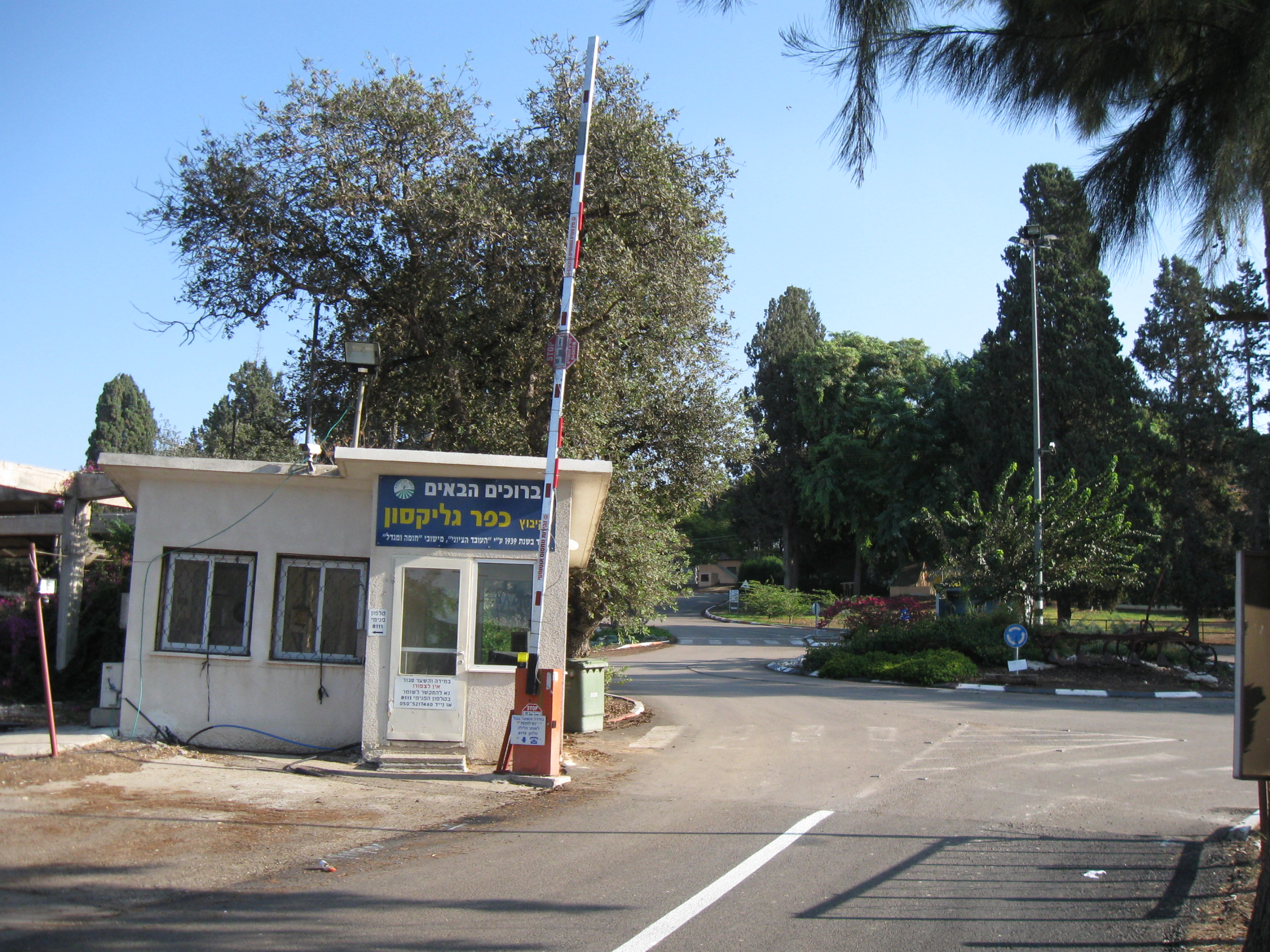
Entrance to the kibbutz

Kfar Glikson (Hebrew: כְּפַר גְּלִיקְסוֹן, lit. 'Glickson Village') is a kibbutz in northern Israel. Located near Binyamina and Pardes Hana-Karkur, it falls under the jurisdiction of Menashe Regional Council. In 2024 it had a population of 394.

== History ==
The kibbutz was established on 23 May 1939 by Jewish immigrants from Romania as a tower and stockade settlement. It was named after Moshe Glickson, editor of Haaretz newspaper between 1922 and 1937, who died on the day of the kibbutz' establishment.

The economy of Kfar Glickson is based on agriculture (field crops, dairy farm), a handicrafts industry and rural tourism. Omega, located in Kfar Glikson, manufactures paints and modelling dough for children.

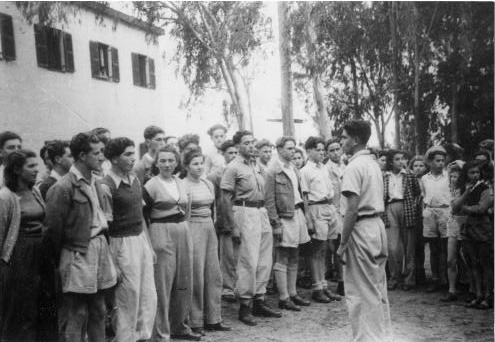
Recruits from Magdiel Zionist Youth training at Kfar Glikson in 1948
