= Ruzhany =

Urban-type settlement in Brest Region, Belarus

Ruzhany Ружаны
- Urban-type settlement
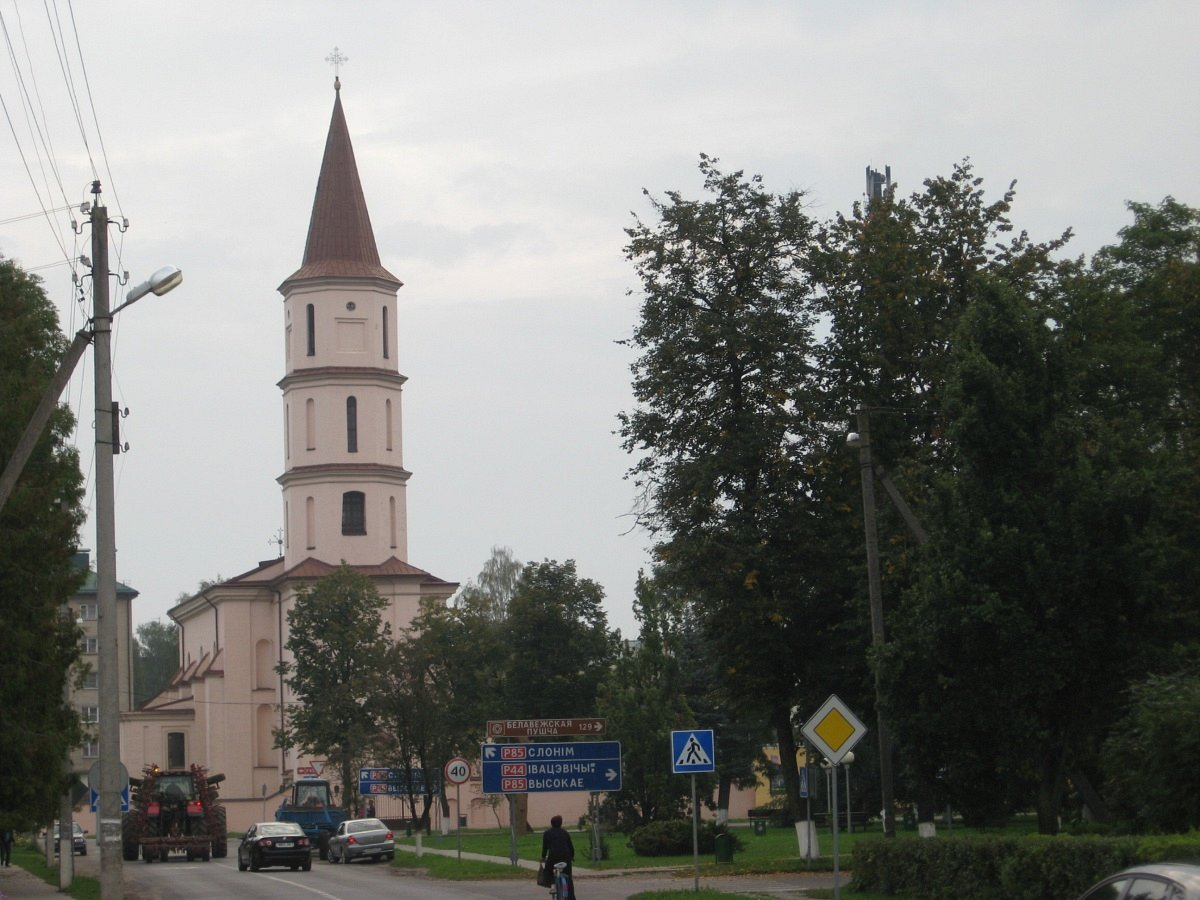

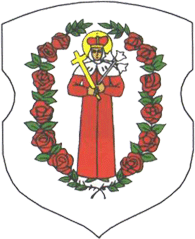
- Coat of arms

- Location within Belarus Location within Europe
- Coordinates: 52°52′N 24°54′E
- Country: Belarus
- Region: Brest Region
- District: Pruzhany District
- First mentioned: 1552

Population (2025)
  - Total: 2,642
- Time zone: UTC+3 (MSK)

Ruzhany, (Note: Belarusian: Ружаны, romanized: Ružany, locally: Ружана, Ружаная; Russian: Ружаны; Polish: Różana; Lithuanian: Ružanai; Yiddish: ראָזשינאָי, romanized: Rozhinoy.) also spelled Rozana or Ruzhana, is an urban-type settlement in Pruzhany District, Brest Region, Belarus. As of 2025, it has a population of 2,642.

== Geography ==
Ruzhany is situated on the river Ruzhanka and surrounded by picturesque hills. It is located 140 kilometres (87 mi) away from Brest, 38 kilometres (24 mi) from Ivatsevichy (where the nearest railway station is located), and 45 kilometres (28 mi) north-east from Pruzhany, on the crossing of the roads from Pruzhany to Slonim and from Vawkavysk to Kosava.

== History ==
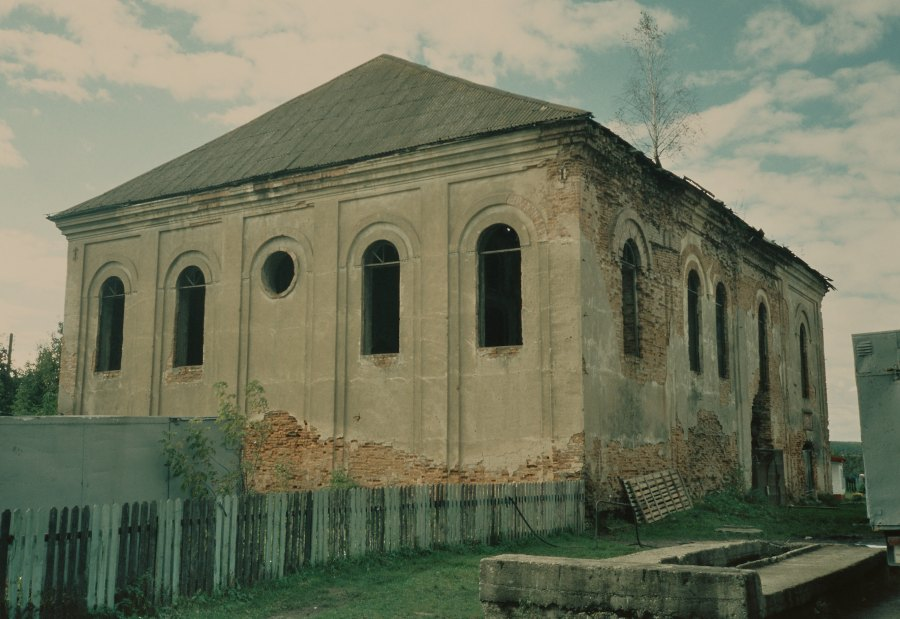
Ruins of town Synagogue

The earliest mentioning of Ruzhany dates back to 1552. Following the First World War the town was part of Poland until September 1939, when it was occupied by the Soviet Union and incorporated into the Byelorussian SSR. From 23 June 1941 until 13 July 1944, Ruzhany was occupied by Nazi Germany and administered as a part of Bezirk Bialystok. Almost the entire pre-war population of 3,500 Jews were killed in the Holocaust, mostly at Treblinka extermination camp.

On 19 September 1659, Yisrael ben Shalom and Tuvyah Bachrach were killed in Ruzhany on Rosh HaShana 5420, in the infamous blood libel.

== Notable people ==
Some notable past residents of Ruzhany include:

- Melech Epstein (1889–1979), American Yiddish language journalist
- I. M. Pines, writer and Zionist
- Louis Leon Ribak, American artist
- Yitzhak Shamir (born Yitzhak Yezernitsky; 1915-2012), Prime Minister of Israel
- The Sapieha family, influential Polish-Lithuanian aristocrats, who built a palace at Ruzhany (see below)

== Notable sights ==
Places of interest in Ruzhany include:

- Ruzhany Palace: a large and impressive but mostly ruined complex, now undergoing complete renovation
- Two large churches: Trinity Church (Catholic, dating from 1617) and Saints Peter & Paul (Orthodox, built 1762–1788)
- A small chapel named for Saint Casimir in the town cemetery
- An ancient Jewish graveyard and a large ruined synagogue
- A small German cemetery
