= Yechiel Michel Pines =

Rabbi and Zionist writer

Rabbi Yechiel Michel Pines
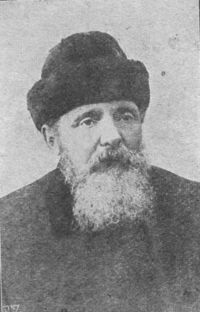

Personal life
- Born: 18 September 1824 Ruzhinoy, Grodno Governorate, Russian Empire
- Died: 15 March 1913 (aged 88) Jerusalem, Mutasarrifate of Jerusalem, Ottoman Empire

Religious life
- Religion: Judaism

Yechiel Michel Pines (/piːnɪs/ PEE-nis) (Hebrew: יְחִיאֵל מִיכְל פִּינֶס; 18 September 1824 – 15 March 1913) was a Russian-born religious Zionist rabbi, writer, and community leader in the Old Yishuv.

== Life ==
Yechiel Michel Pines was born at Ruzhinoy, near Grodno. He was the son of Noah Pines and the son-in-law of Shemariah Luria, rabbi of Mogilev. He received both a religious and secular Jewish education, and was mentored by Rabbi Mordechai Gimpel Jaffe, an early leader of Ḥovevei Zion.

He later became a merchant, giving lectures at the same time in the yeshiva of his native town. He was elected delegate to a conference held in London by the association Mazkereth Moshe, for the establishment of charitable institutions in Palestine in commemoration of the name of Sir Moses Montefiore. In 1878 he settled in Jerusalem, at the home of his relative Yosef Rivlin, to establish and organize such institutions.

At the end of his life, Pines was an instructor in Talmud at the Hebrew Teachers' Seminary in Jerusalem.

== Legacy ==
There is a street named after Pines near Davidka Square in Jerusalem, as well as streets in Rehovot, Ra'anana, Gedera, and Petah Tikvah. The Israeli religious moshav Kfar Pines is named after him.
