= Ein Iron =

Ein Iron: עֵין עִירוֹן (Hebrew)
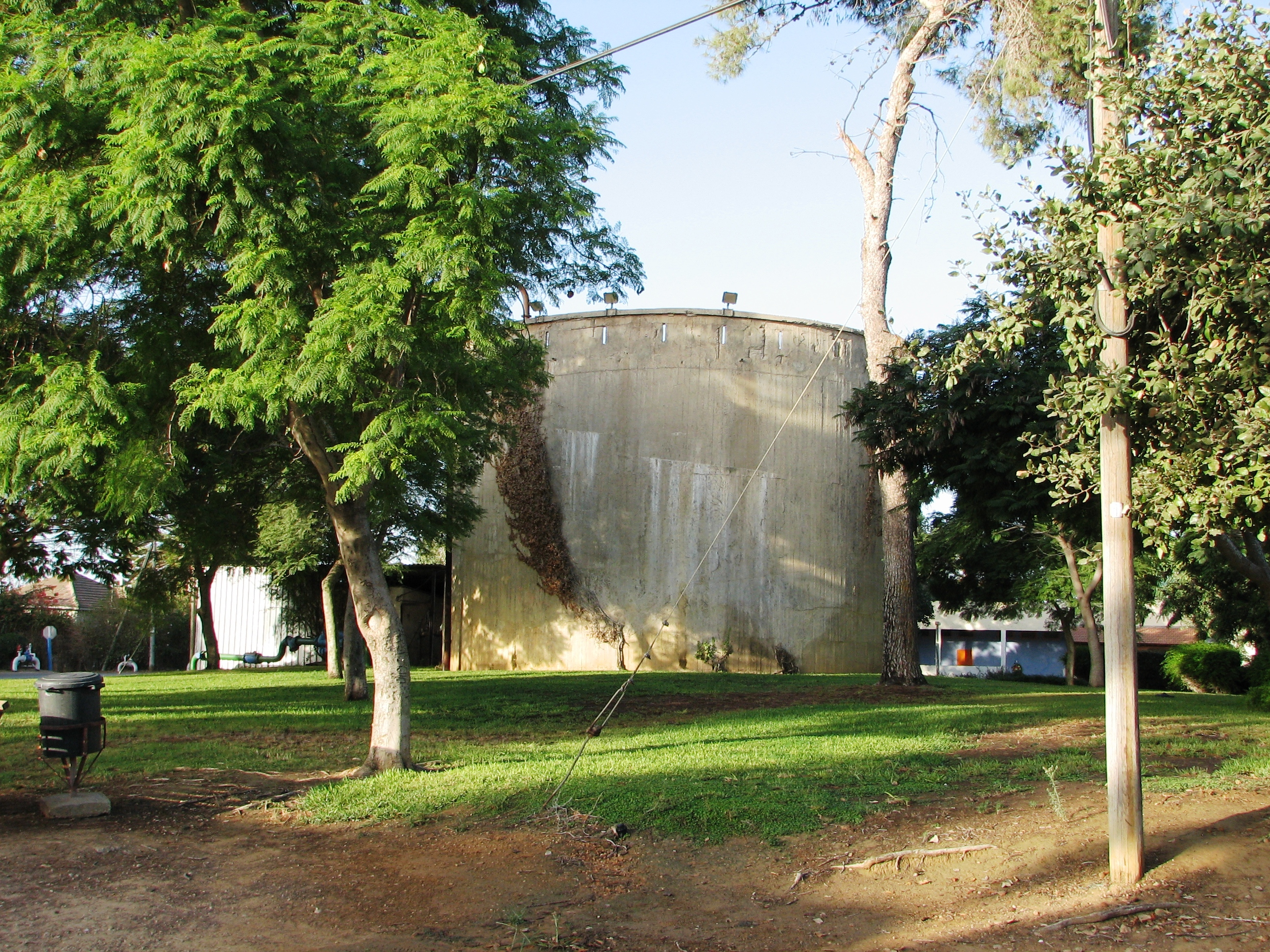

- Location within Haifa region of Israel Location within Israel
- Coordinates: 32°28′57″N 35°0′34″E
- Country: Israel
- District: Haifa
- Subdistrict: Hadera
- Council: Menashe
- Affiliation: Moshavim Movement
- Founded: 1934
- Founder: Polish Jews
- Population (2024): 594

Ein Iron (Hebrew: עֵין עִירוֹן, lit. 'Spring of Iron') is a moshav in northern Israel. Located in the eastern Sharon plain to the north-east of Hadera, it falls under the jurisdiction of Menashe Regional Council. In 2024 it had a population of 594.

== History ==
The village was established in 1934 by immigrants of the Second Aliyah, mainly Polish Jews, later joined by German Jews. Its name is derived from the fact that it overlooks Nahal Iron.

== Economy ==
Fishbein farm produces an alcoholic (12%) passion fruit beverage.
