= Maor =

Maor: מָאוֹר (Hebrew)
- Etymology: Source of light
- Location within Haifa region of Israel
- Coordinates: 32°25′31″N 35°00′16″E
- Country: Israel
- District: Haifa
- Subdistrict: Hadera
- Council: Menashe
- Affiliation: Moshavim Movement
- Founded: 1953
- Founder: Romanian Jews
- Population (2024): 1,735

Maor (Hebrew: מָאוֹר) is a moshav in north-central Israel. The word Maor means a light or luminary in Hebrew. Located near Baqa al-Gharbiyye, it falls under the jurisdiction of Menashe Regional Council. In 2024 it had a population of 1,735.

== History ==
The moshav was established in 1953 by Jewish immigrants from Romania and Poland; was abandoned after several years, and re-established in 1957 by Jewish immigrants from Yemen.

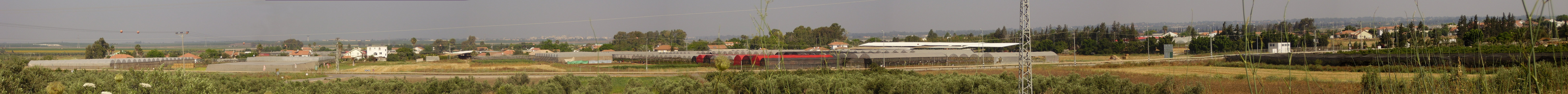
Panoramic view of the moshav from south-east

== See also ==
- Maor Tiyouri (born 1990), Israeli Olympic long-distance runner
