= Menashe Regional Council =

Coordinates: 32°28′N 35°01′E

Menashe מנשה
- Regional council (from 1950)
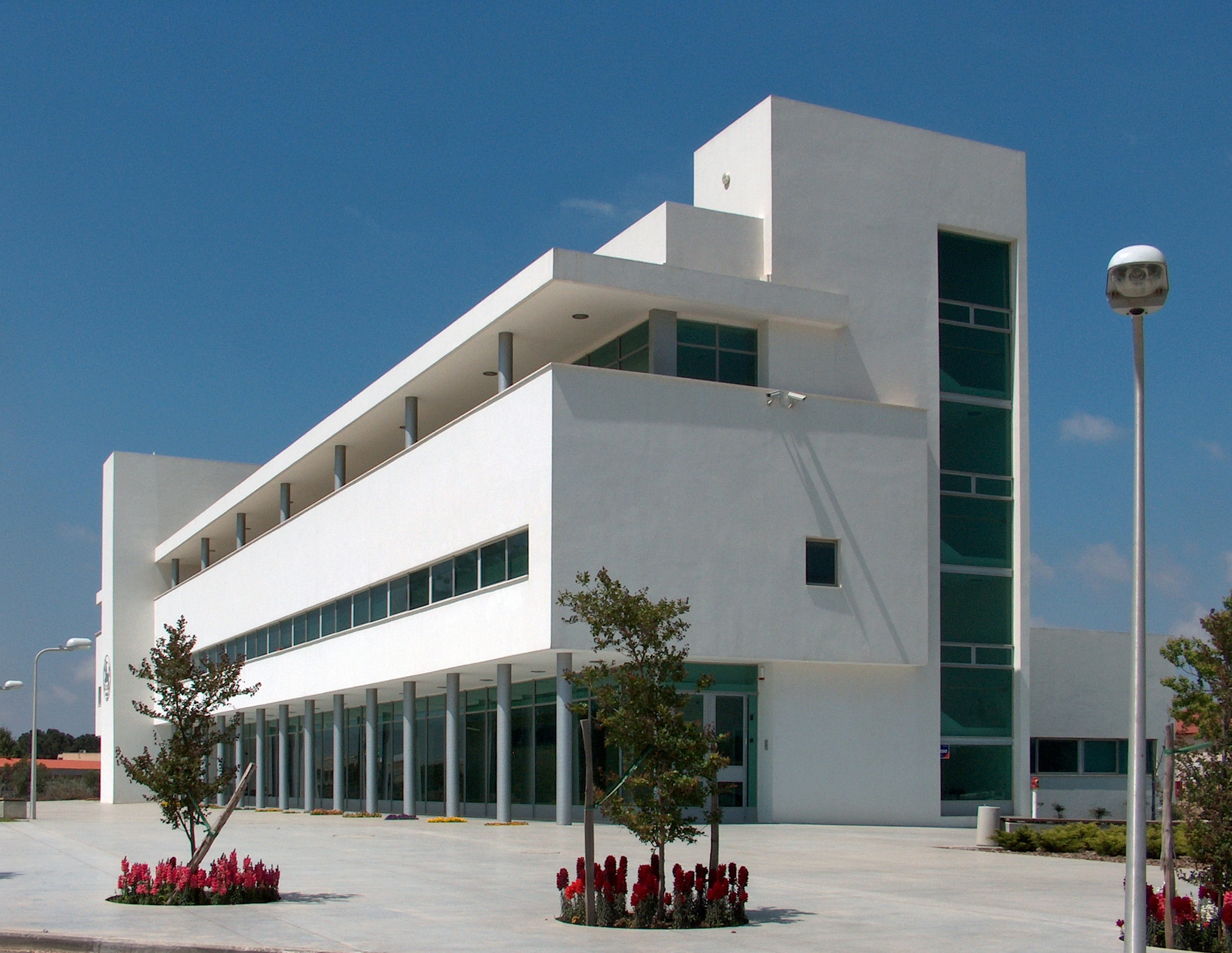

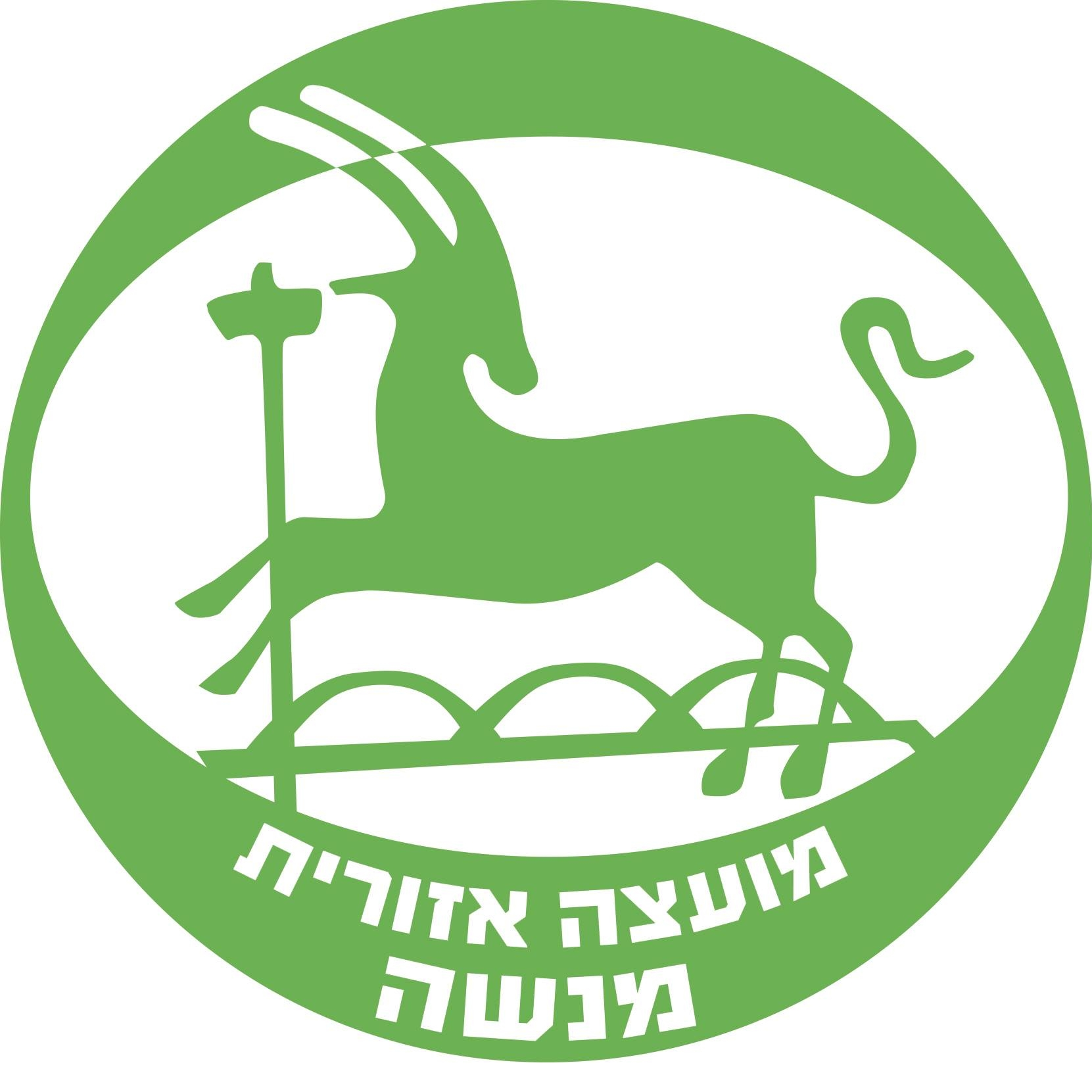
- Interactive map of Menashe
- Country: Israel
- District: Haifa
- Subdistrict: Hadera
- Natural region: Alexander Mountain, Hadera

Government
  - Head of Municipality: Ilan Sade

Area
  - Total: 112,390 dunams (112.39 km^{2}; 43.39 sq mi)

Population (2014)
  - Total: 18,600
  - Density: 165/km^{2} (429/sq mi)
- Website: Official website

The Menashe Regional Council (Hebrew: מועצה אזורית מנשה, Mo'atza Azorit Menasheh) is a regional council near the city of Hadera, on Israel's north-central coastal plain in the southern Haifa District. It is named after the tribe of Menashe which had been allotted this region (and a much larger territory around) according to the Book of Joshua (17:1-10).

== List of localities ==
This regional council provides various municipal services for the 21 communities within its territory:

Kibbutzim

- Barkai
- Ein Shemer
- Gan Shmuel
- Kfar Glikson
- Lahavot Haviva
- Magal
- Ma'anit
- Metzer
- Mishmarot
- Regavim

Moshavim

- Ein Iron
- Gan HaShomron
- Kfar Pines
- Maor
- Mei Ami
- Sde Yitzhak
- Talmei Elazar

Arab villages

- al-Arian
- Meiser
- Umm al-Qutuf

Other villages

- Alonei Yitzhak
- Sha'ar Menashe

== Demographics ==
Historical population
Year	Pop.	±%
1972	4,500	—
1983	6,100	+35.6%
1995	7,200	+18.0%
2008	12,480	+73.3%
2022	21,808	+74.7%
2024	22,626	+3.8%

== Voting Patterns ==
In the 2022 election, 72 percent of voters in the regional council voted for the parties of the center-left coalition led by Yair Lapid, while 16 percent voted for the parties of the right-wing coalition led by Benjamin Netanyahu and 12 percent voted for the Arab parties.

In the 2026 election, 66 percent of voters in the regional council voted for the parties of the center-left coalition led by Gadi Eisenkot, while 17 percent voted for the Arab parties and 13 percent voted for the parties of the right-wing coalition led by Benjamin Netanyahu. An additional 2.4 percent voted for the Reservists, and 1.5 percent voted for Amcha Yisrael. Voter turnout increased 24 percent from the 2022 election.

== See also ==
- Wadi Ara
