= Harish, Israel =

City in northern Israel

Harish: חָרִישׁ; خريش
- City council (from 2022)

Hebrew transcription(s)
  - ISO 259: Ḥariš
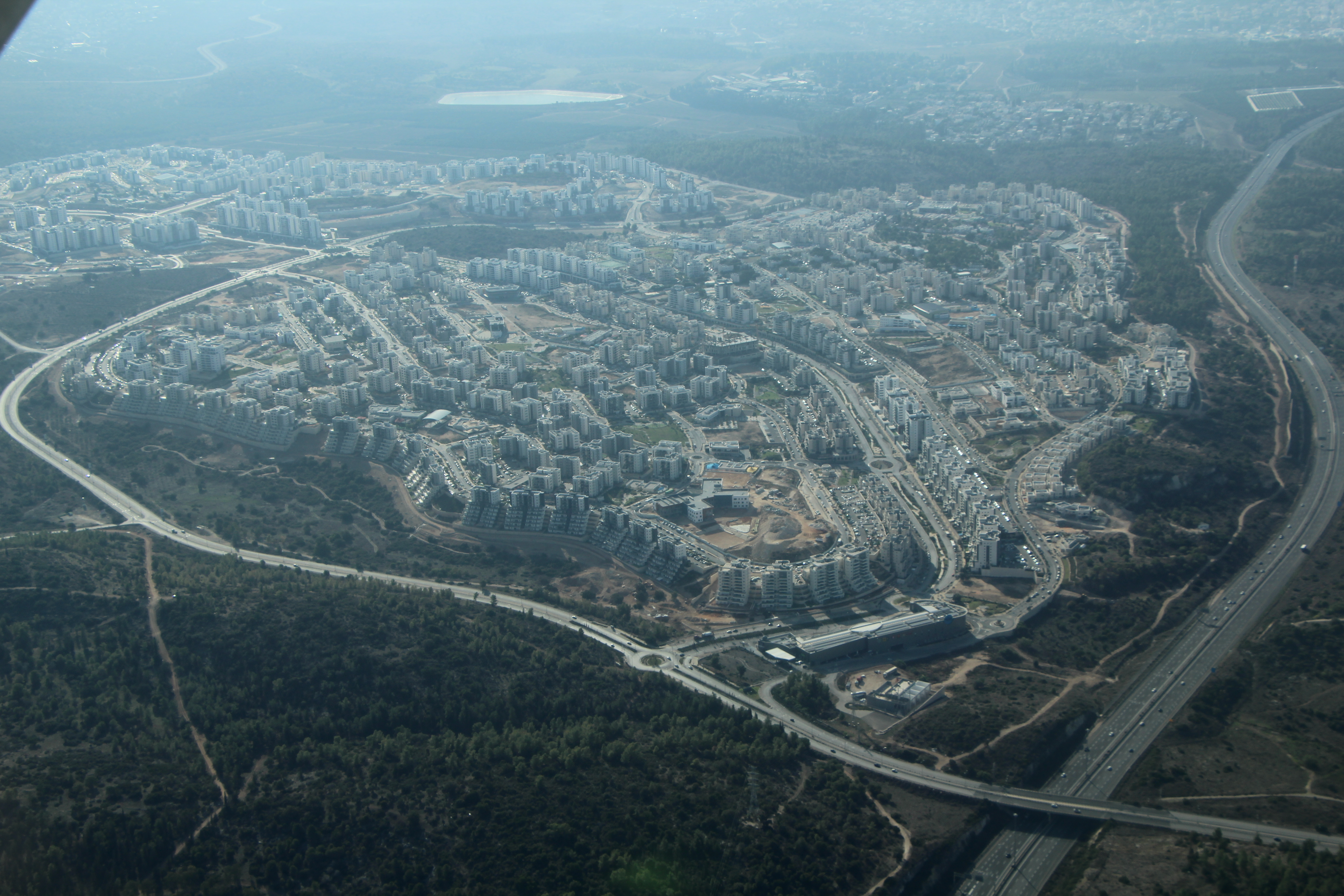

- Location within Haifa region of Israel Location within Israel
- Coordinates: 32°27′33″N 35°2′34″E
- Country: Israel
- District: Haifa
- Subdistrict: Hadera
- Natural Region: Alexander Mountain
- Founded: 1980

Government
  - Mayor: Yochai Fara’ji

Area
  - Total: 9,736 dunams (9.736 km^{2}; 3.759 sq mi)

Population (2024)
  - Total: 41,574
  - Density: 4,270/km^{2} (11,060/sq mi)
- Name meaning: Ploughed furrow

Harish (Hebrew: חָרִישׁ, cha-reesh, lit. "ploughed furrow") is a city in the north of Israel. Its jurisdiction is an area of 9,739 dunams. It is currently being expanded into a city projected eventually to have a population of 100,000. In 2024 it had a population of 41,574.

== History ==
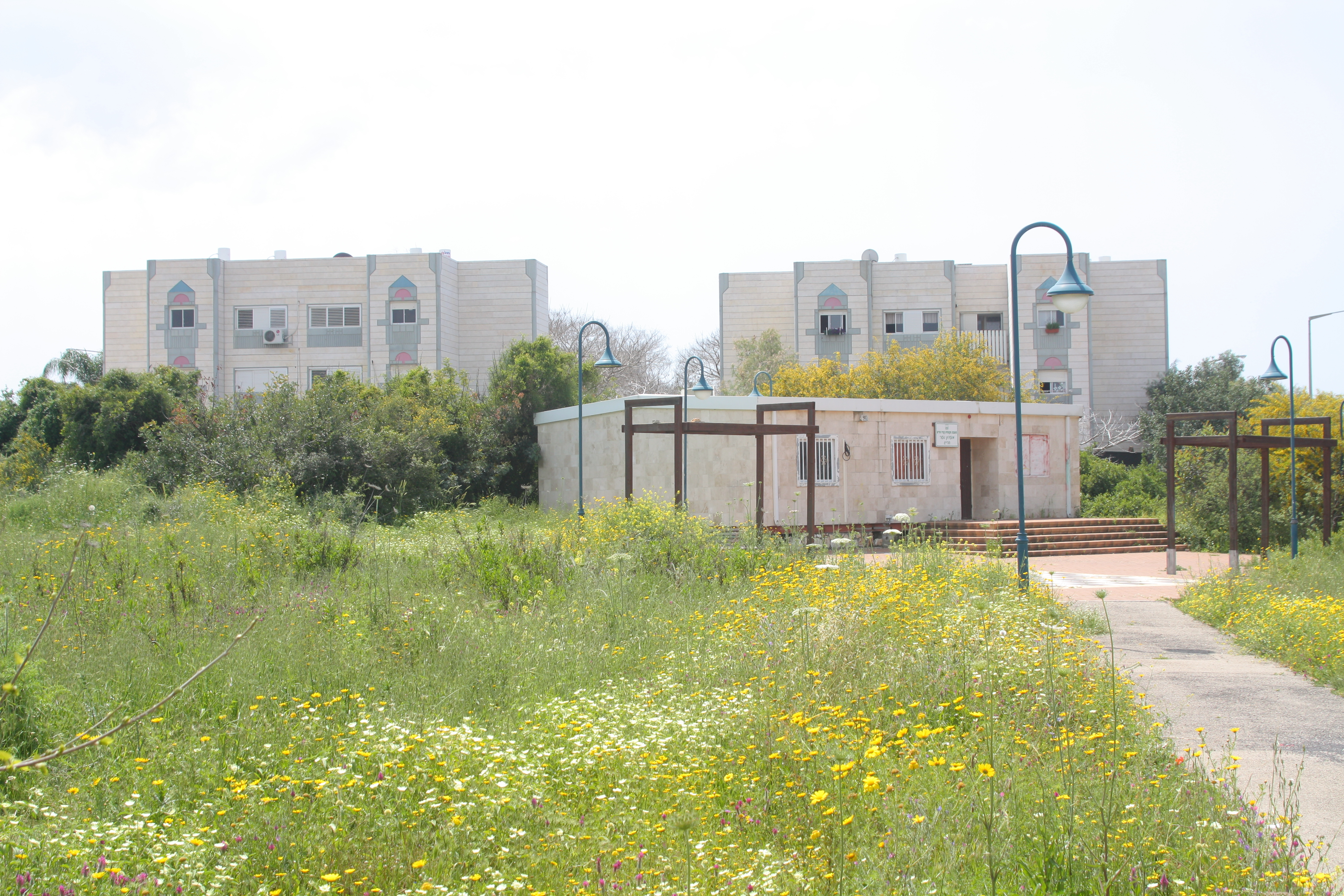
Harish, 2011

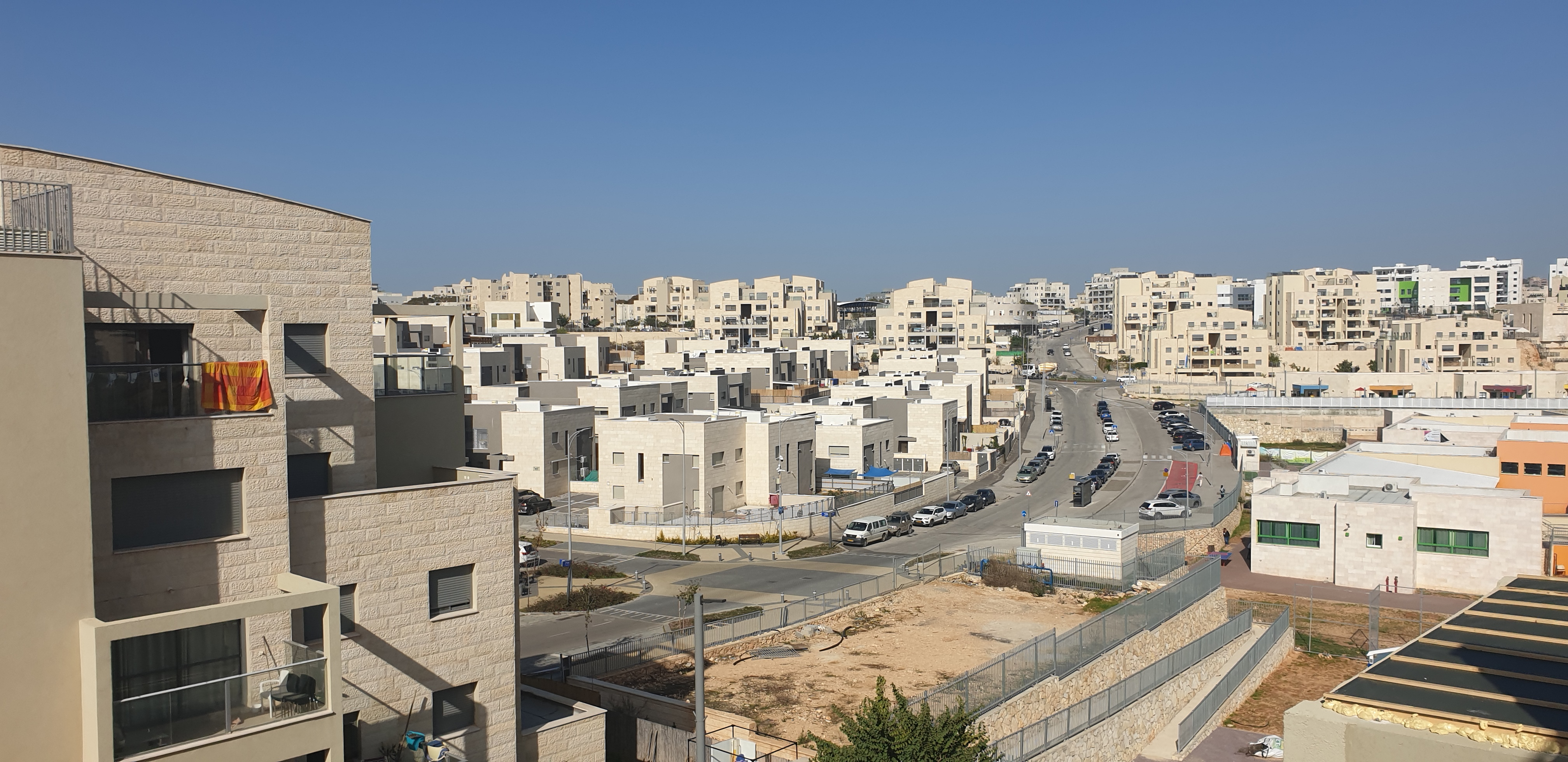
Harish, 2022

Harish was founded as a Nahal settlement in 1982 and converted into a kibbutz in 1985. The kibbutz disbanded in 1993.

Following a government decision, a new neighborhood of 300 housing units was built on the site and marketed to career army officers, although few moved there. Harish merged with the neighboring town of Katzir, forming Katzir-Harish. They separated again in 2012, with Harish remaining a town, and Katzir reverting to the jurisdiction of Menashe Regional Council.

In the 1990s, the low cost of housing attracted young couples, mostly secular, but in 2003, a group of Garin Torani families moved to the town. In addition, an Arab Bedouin clan from Ramla moved there in order to end a bloody feud with another clan.

In 2007, Israeli Housing Minister Ariel Atias came up with a plan to develop Harish into a city with a population of 100,000. Fearing it would become a Haredi stronghold, the secular residents led by Hemi Bar-Or petitioned the Israeli Supreme Court. Housing tenders were opened to the general public, attracting Israelis looking for affordable housing and bicycle enthusiasts who eyed the nearby forests as a weekend cycling destination. A bid was placed by a group of secular buyers in 2012.

A master plan for Harish designed by Mansfeld-Kehat Architects calls for the expansion of Harish to Highway 65 in the north, and Baqa al-Gharbiyye in the south. Construction of new neighborhoods began in 2013. By August 2015, construction was well underway, with many buildings nearing completion.

In January 2016, the Israeli cabinet approved a 1 billion NIS plan to turn Harish into a city of 50,000 in three years, with the eventual goal of 100,000. Harish will be expanded to the northeast, with residential areas, a business zone, a hotel, 600 dunams of public parks and gardens, and a special site consolidating all emergency services.

Harish is being built as a smart city, with full WiFi coverage and its own fiber optic cables, LED streetlights with sensors, camera-equipped lampposts, and smart trash cans that will signal trucks through the Internet when they need to be emptied. A 60 meter wide main boulevard will be built with an island in the middle lined with bicycle paths, benches, and small cafes. It has also been suggested that a light rail line may be built in the future.

On 24 May 2022, Harish formally gained the status of a city.

=== Exceptionally large Chalcolithic & Early Bronze Age settlements ===
==== Early Bronze Age ====
Archaeologists discovered the ruins of a 5,000 year-old city, the largest Early Bronze Age settlement with an area of 160 acres in Ein Esur archaeological site in 2019. According to the archaeologist Dr. Yitzhak Paz from the Israel Antiquities Authority, "this site is more than two or three times larger than the others [in this area] during this period." Millions of pottery shards and basalt stone vessels, several figurines of people and animals, tools imported from Egypt, flint tools were also found from the site.

"This is a huge city – a megalopolis in relation to the Early Bronze Age, where thousands of inhabitants, who made their living from agriculture, lived and traded with different regions and even with different cultures and kingdoms in the area. This is the Early Bronze Age New York of our region; a cosmopolitan and planned city," said excavation directors.

==== Chalcolithic ====
Additionally, the remains of a large, 7,000-year-old Early Chalcolithic village already showing signs of incipient urbanisation and with an open space used for cultic activities was also revealed by IAA archaeologists right below the two millennia younger Early Bronze Age stratum.

== Demographics ==
Historical population
Year	Pop.	±%
1995	1,500	—
2008	3,300	+120.0%
2022	31,733	+861.6%
2024	41,574	+31.0%

== Voting Patterns ==
In the 2022 election, 66 percent of voters in Harish voted for the parties of the right-wing coalition led by Benjamin Netanyahu, while 29 percent voted for the parties of the center-left coalition led by Yair Lapid and 1 percent voted for the Arab parties.

In the 2026 election, 61 percent of voters in Harish voted for the parties of the right-wing coalition led by Benjamin Netanyahu, while 29 percent voted for the parties of the center-left coalition led by Gadi Eisenkot and 1.5 percent voted for the Arab parties. An additional 4.1 percent voted for the Reservists, and 2.4 percent voted for Amcha Yisrael. Voter turnout increased 41 percent from the 2022 election.
