= Pardes Hanna-Karkur =

Pardes Hanna-Karkur פַּרְדֵּס חַנָּה-כַּרְכּוּר
- Local council in Israel

Hebrew transcription(s)
  - ISO 259: Pardes Ḥanna - Karkur
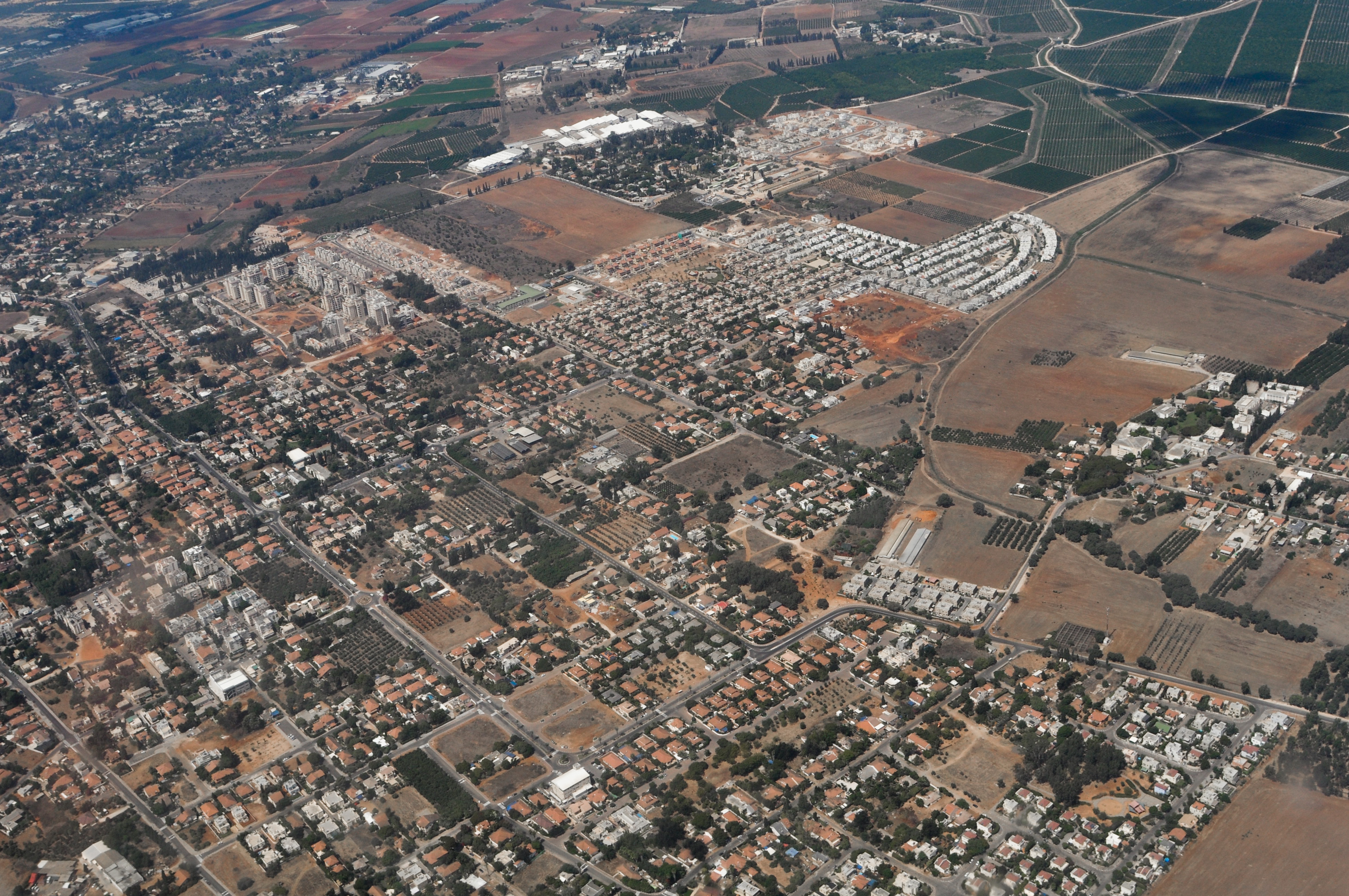

- Location within Haifa region of Israel Location within Israel
- Coordinates: 32°28′16″N 34°58′03″E
- Country: Israel
- District: Haifa
- Subdistrict: Hadera
- Natural Region: Hadera
- Founded: 1913 (Karkur), 1929 (Pardes Hanna)
- Consolidated: 1969 (Pardes Hanna-Karkur)

Government
  - Head of Municipality: Yoni Hakimi

Area
  - Total: 22,596 dunams (22.596 km^{2}; 8.724 sq mi)

Population (2024)
  - Total: 46,601
  - Density: 2,062.4/km^{2} (5,341.5/sq mi)

Pardes Hanna-Karkur (Hebrew: פַּרְדֵּס חַנָּה-כַּרְכּוּר) is a town in the Haifa District of Israel. In 2024 it had a population of 46,601. It has been characterized as having a hipster culture.

== History ==
In 1913, modern Pardes Chana was established when 15 square kilometers of land was purchased by the Hachsharat Hayishuv society from Arabs in Jenin and Haifa for 400,000 francs (a sum equivalent to 2 million US dollars). Two years later, the land was sold to a private investor, Yitzhak Shlezinger, the Odessa Committee and the First London Ahuza society. This land became the core of Karkur, Moshav Gan Hashomron and Kibbutz Ein Shemer. Until actual settlement began, the area was guarded by Hashomer, which planted eucalyptus trees to circumvent a Turkish law that allowed the Ottomans to expropriate lands if they were not cultivated for three years.

The early settlements did not fare well. Shlezinger went bankrupt and sold his land to the Jewish National Fund. The London Ahuza society hoped to settle English Jews on the land, but succeeded only partially. Eventually the Jewish National Fund and the London Ahuza society joined forces to establish Karkur.

According to a census conducted in 1922 by the British Mandate authorities, Karkur had a population of 38 inhabitants, consisting of 35 Jews and 3 Muslims.

Pardes Hanna was founded in 1929 by Palestine Jewish Colonisation Association, just east of Karkur.

By 1931, the census in Karkur reported 189 houses, with a Muslim majority (282 Jews and 564 Muslims); and 282 people lived in Pardes Hanna, all Jews. In 1945, the population of Karkur village recorded as 2,380, with Karkur itself having 900 people, all Jews; Pardes Hanna village showed 2,300 Jews and 670 Muslims, with 1,860 people (all Jews) in Pardes Hanna itself.

During World War II, residents worked in Ein Shemer Airfield, operated by the British Royal Air Force as RAF Ein Shemer. According to Marom, "Jewish workers socialised with British troops at nearby coffeehouses like Teacher’s Garden Café and other public institutions in Karkur. Jewish residents of Karkur nicknamed their settlement a ‘colony of love’ because many English-speaking women fraternised with the British soldiers, under the auspices of the local Jewish Hospitality Committee."

On 6 April 1948, the Irgun raided the British Army camp at Pardes Hanna, killing seven British soldiers and stealing a large quantity of weapons.

After Israeli independence, Neveh Efraim was founded by Jewish immigrants from Yemen and Neve Oved was established by the Labor movement. In addition, many Jews from Mumbai, India, including Jews from Bahrain who fled to Israel via Mumbai, settled there.

In the 1950s, the villages Tel Shalom and Neve Efraim were merged with Pardes Hanna. Pardes Hanna and Karkur merged in 1969.

The meaning of the name Pardes Hanna in Hebrew is "Hannah's [Citrus] Orchard". The place is named after Hannah Primrose, Countess of Rosebery née de Rothschild (1851–1890), daughter of Mayer Anschel Rothschild. Naming the town after Hannah Primrose née de Rothschild is part of tradition of having cities, towns and other settlements in Israel named in honor of members of the Rothschild family, primarily due to the generosity and influence of Baron Edmond James de Rothschild, HaNadiv (the Benefactor), upon the history of the Land of Israel and the State of Israel. Pardes Hanna, which as of 2019 had a population of 43,000, is one of 10 cities, towns or settlements in the State of Israel bearing the name of a Rothschild. The others are, in order of their founding: Zichron Ya'akov (1882), Mazkeret Batya (1883), Bat Shlomo (1889), Meir Shfeya (1891), Givat Ada (1903), Binyamina (1922), Ashdot Ya'akov (1924), Shadmot Dvora (1924) and Sde Eliezer (1950). The reason Pardes Hanna was named for Hanna Primrose née de Rothschild in particular is uncertain but she appears to have contributed to Jewish causes; the Rothschild archive site attests: "In the Jewish community [in Britain] she was a generous, though often anonymous benefactor".

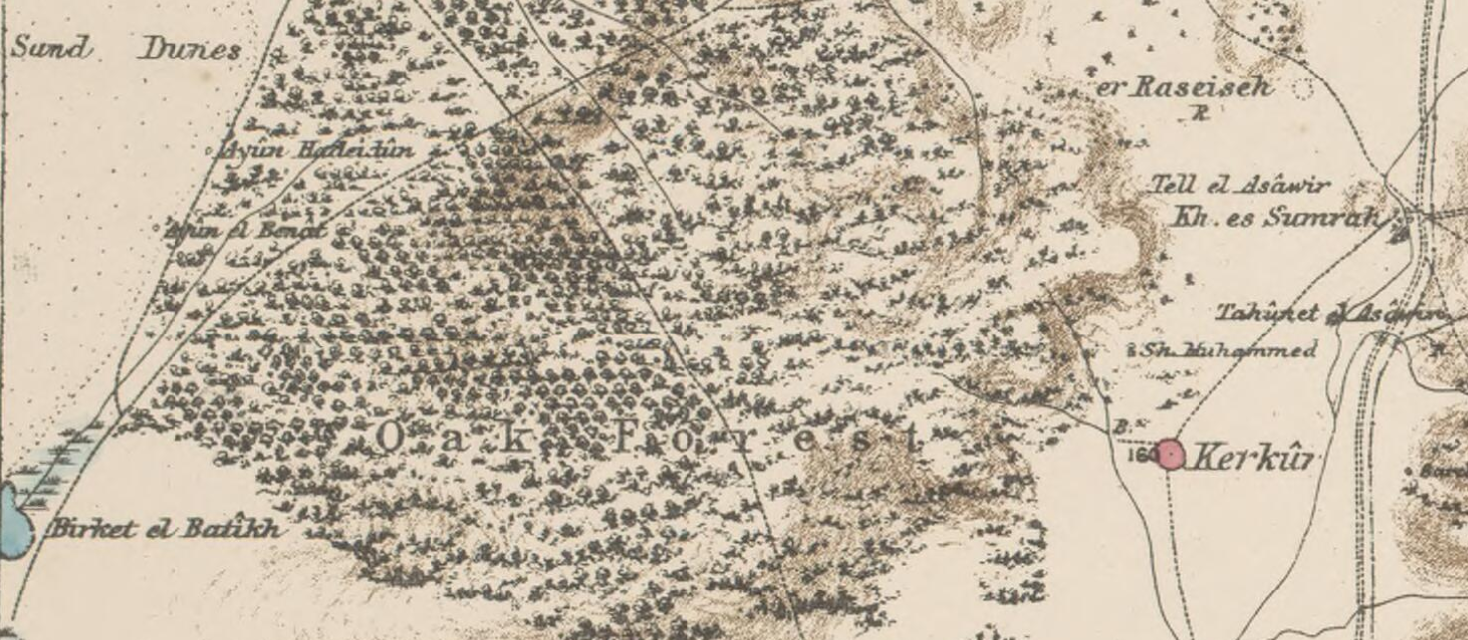
Kerkur 1878 1:63,360

Karkur 1928

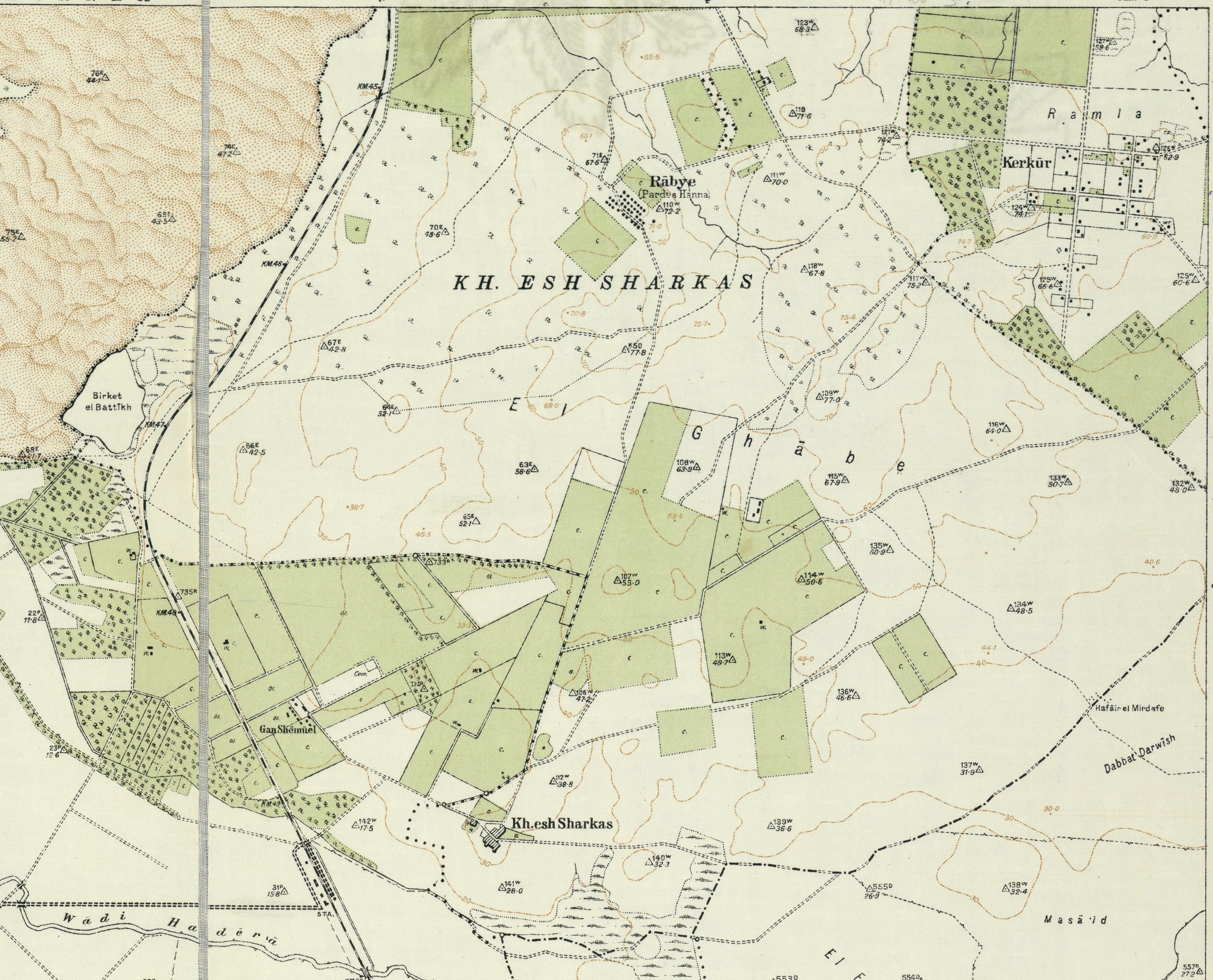
Pardes Hanna (Rabye) and Kerkur 1932 1:20,000

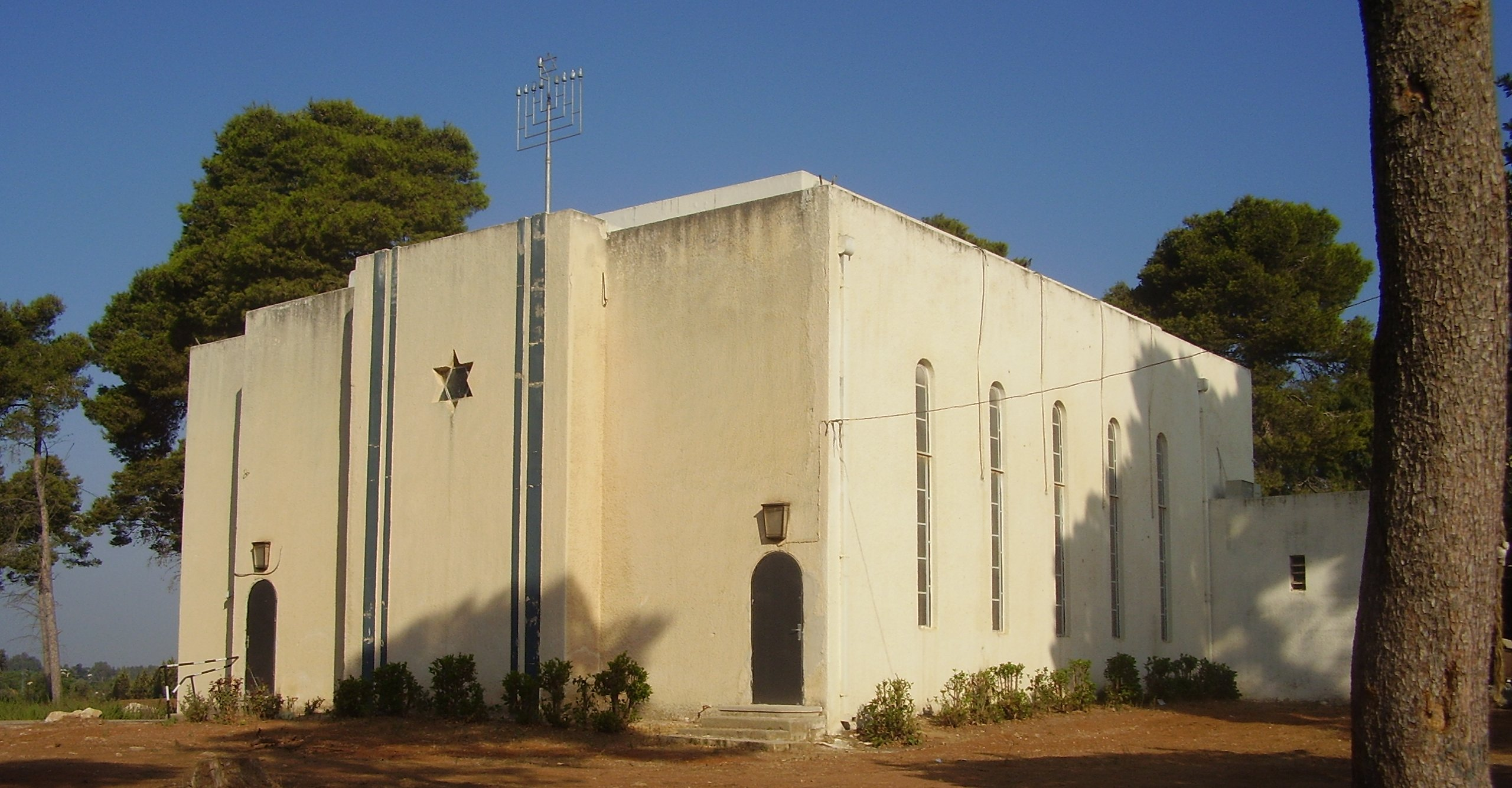
Great synagogue of Pardes Hanna, established in 1936

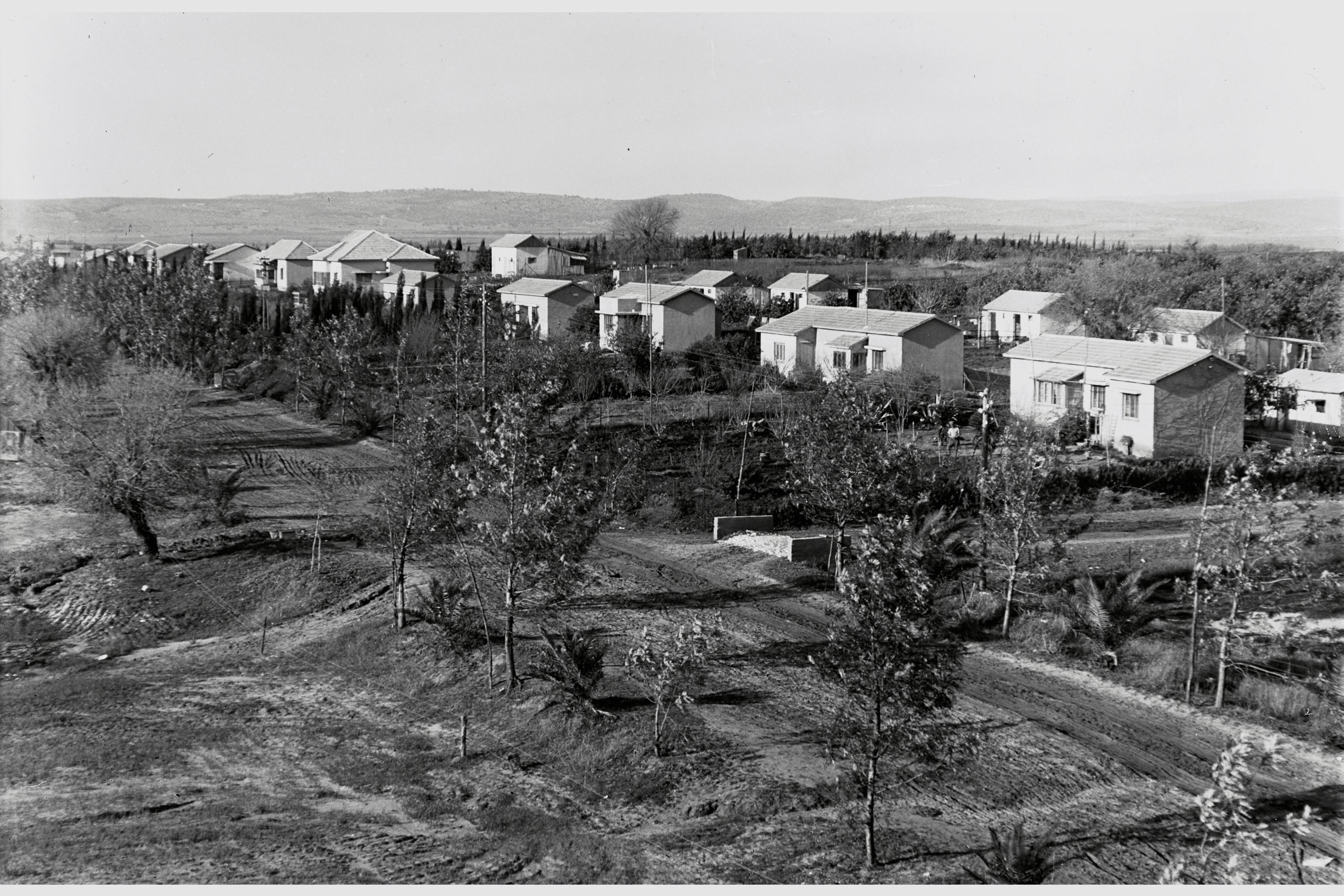
Pardes Hanna, 1938

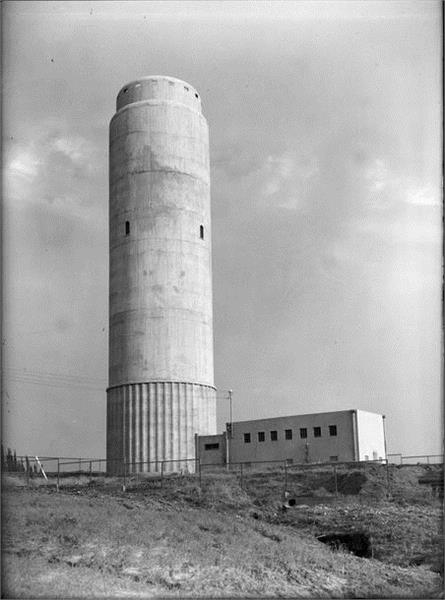
Pardes Hanna water tower 1930

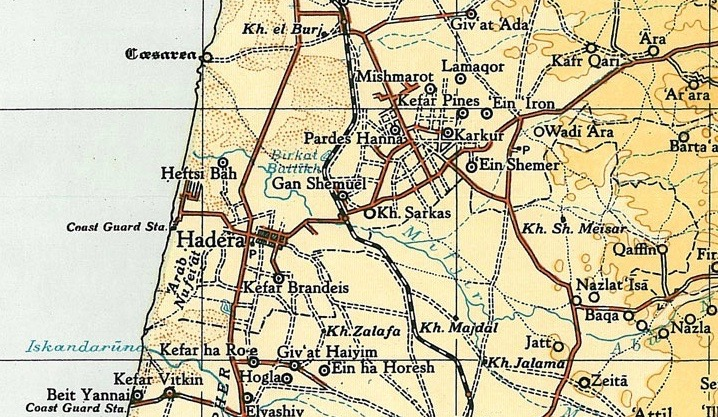
Pardes Hanna and Karkur 1945 1:250,000

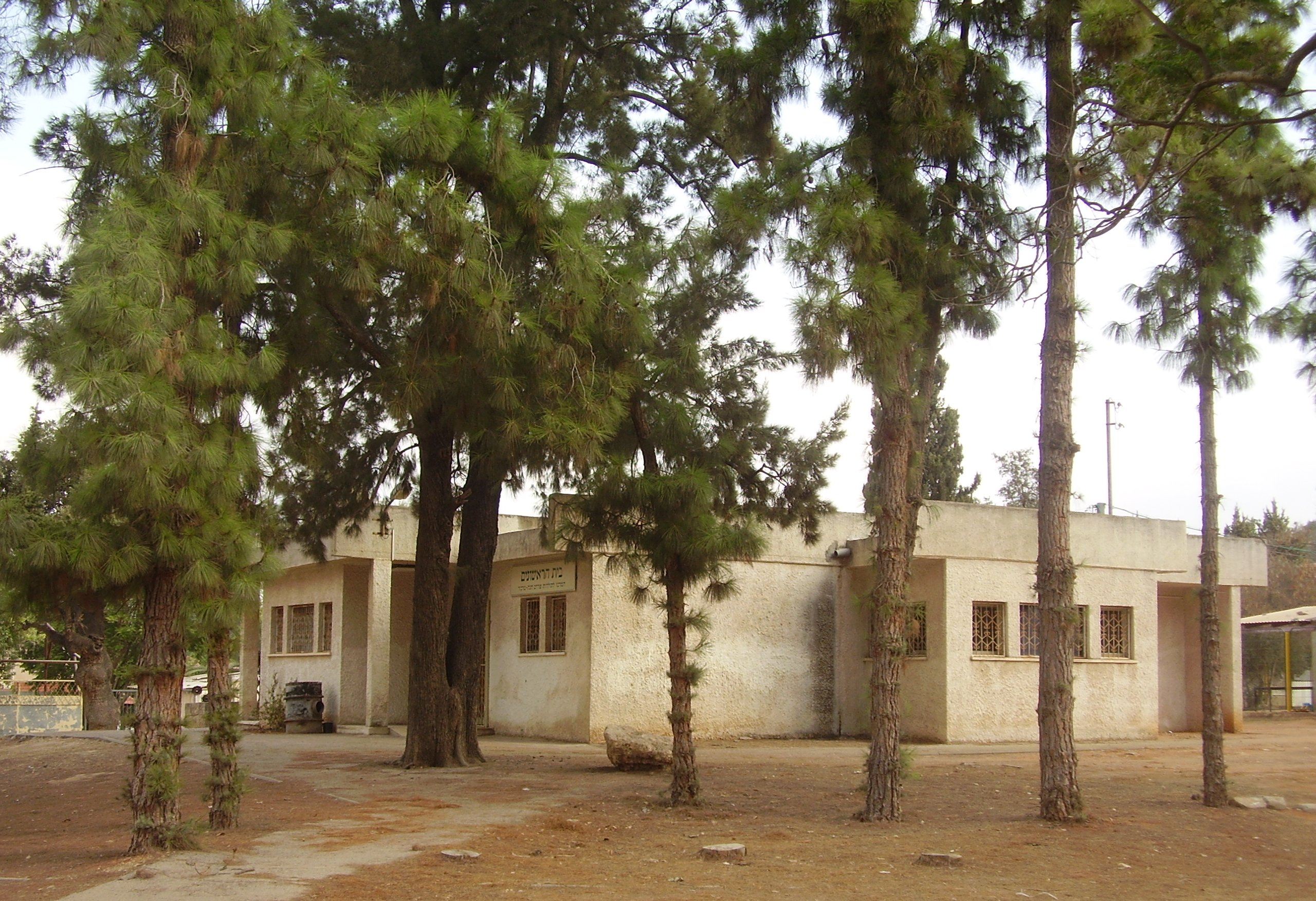
Beit Harishonim, Pardes Hanna

Hannah Primrose, Countess of Rosebery, née de Rothschild, after whom Pardes Hanna is named; painted by Frederic Leighton

== Demographics ==
Historical population
Year	Pop.	±%
1972	13,900	—
1983	16,000	+15.1%
1995	21,900	+36.9%
2008	30,400	+38.8%
2022	44,161	+45.3%
2024	46,601	+5.5%

According to the Israel Central Bureau of Statistics, the population of Pardes Hanna-Karkur was 46,601 at end of 2024. The land area is 22,596 dunams (~22.6 km^{2} [8.7 sq mi]). Pardes-Hanna is governed by the largest local council in Israel by population size among towns without municipal status.

== Education ==
The oldest and largest school in Pardes Hanna-Karkur is the Pardes Hanna Agricultural High School. It was established in 1934 by the Association of Farmers and was the first agricultural school to include a full academic matriculation program as part of its curriculum. Pardes Hanna-Karkur has six non-religious elementary schools, including a Democratic school, and four religious elementary schools, as well as the Rimon Waldorf School. A religious high-school for boys, Midrashiat Noam, was once considered the flagship of religious-Zionist education. Its graduates include former ministers Yitzhak Peretz, Benny Elon and Yaakov Neeman; journalists Haim Zisowitz, Yair Sheleg and Adam Baruch; and Labor Party Secretary-General Eitan Cabel. A religious high school for girls, Elisheva, is also located in Pardes Hanna.

== Culture ==
It has been characterized as having a hipster culture, while keeping a balance between modern and traditional.

There are the Hora Aviv Pardes Hanna Israeli folk dance troupes, classified by age.

== Transportation ==
Pardes Hanna-Karkur is served by the Caesarea-Pardes Hanna railway Station and by buses run by Egged and Kavim. It is connected to Highway 4 by Road 651, to Highway 65 by Roads 650, 652 and 6502, and to Highway 70 by Road 652.

== Voting Patterns ==
In the 2022 election, 54 percent of voters in Pardes Hanna-Karkur voted for the parties of the center-left coalition led by Yair Lapid, while 42 percent voted for the parties of the right-wing coalition led by Benjamin Netanyahu and 0.6 percent voted for the Arab parties.

In the 2026 election, 58 percent of voters in Pardes Hanna-Karkur voted for the parties of the center-left coalition led by Gadi Eisenkot, while 36 percent voted for the parties of the right-wing coalition led by Benjamin Netanyahu and 0.6 percent voted for the Arab parties. An additional 3.5 percent voted for the Reservists, and 1.8 percent voted for Amcha Yisrael. Voter turnout increased 24 percent from the 2022 election.

== Notable residents ==
- Meir Ariel, Israeli singer-songwriter.
- Gal Fridman, Olympic gold medal-winning windsurfer.
- Kobi Shabtai, Former Police Commissioner.
- Shai Avivi, Actor.
- Hanan Ben Ari, Israeli singer, songwriter, and composer.
- Eden Hason, Mizrahi singer.
- Pe'er Tasi, Mizrahi singer.
- Aleeza Ben Shalom, matchmaker, relationship coach, and author.
- Akiva Turgeman, Israeli singer.

== See also ==
- Karkur junction suicide bombing
