= Hadera Subdistrict =

Hadera Subdistrict נפת חדרה قضاء الخضيرة / قضاء حديرا
- Subdistrict
- Interactive map of Hadera Subdistrict
- Country: Israel
- District: Haifa

Area
  - Total: 572 km^{2} (221 sq mi)

Population (2024)
  - Total: 525,198

Ethnicity
  - Jews and others: 59.1%
  - Arabs: 39.8%

The Hadera Subdistrict is one of Israel's subdistricts in Haifa District. The district is composed of mostly of the Southern half of Mandatory Haifa Subdistrict.

== Demographics ==
Historical population
Year	Pop.	±%
1972	109,500	—
1983	141,200	+28.9%
1995	216,300	+53.2%
2008	355,650	+64.4%
2022	493,341	+38.7%
2024	525,198	+6.5%

== Administrative local authorities ==
Cities	Local Councils	Regional Councils
Baqa al-Gharbiyye; Hadera; Harish; Or Akiva; Umm al-Fahm	Ar'ara; Basma; Binyamina-Giv'at Ada; Fureidis; Jatt; Jisr az-Zarqa; Kafr Qara; Ma'ale Iron; Pardes Hanna-Karkur; Zikhron Ya'akov	Alona; Hof HaCarmel; Menashe

== Voting Patterns ==
In the 2022 election, 36.4 percent of voters in the subdistrict voted for the parties of the center-left coalition led by Yair Lapid, while 34.4 percent voted for the parties of the right-wing coalition led by Benjamin Netanyahu and 29.2 percent voted for the Arab parties.

In the 2026 election, 39 percent of voters in the subdistrict voted for the Arab parties, while 31 percent voted for the parties of the center-left coalition led by Gadi Eisenkot and 25 percent voted for the parties of the right-wing coalition led by Benjamin Netanyahu. An additional 2.3 percent voted for the Reservists, and 1.1 percent voted for Amcha Yisrael. Voter turnout increased 43 percent from the 2022 election.

== Natural Regions ==
Districts, Subdistricts and Natural Regions of the State of Israel, 2018

- 321 Karmel Coast
  - Population (2024): 36,200
  - Largest city: Fureidis
- 322 Zikhron Ya'akov
  - Population (2024): 29,467
  - Largest city: Zikhron Ya'akov
- 323 Alexander Mountain
  - Population (2024): 180,516
  - Largest city: Umm al-Fahm
- 324 Hadera
  - Population (2024): 279,015
  - Largest city: Hadera
