= Giv'at Olga =

Suburb of Hadera, Israel

Coordinates: 32°26′27.2″N 34°53′00.8″E

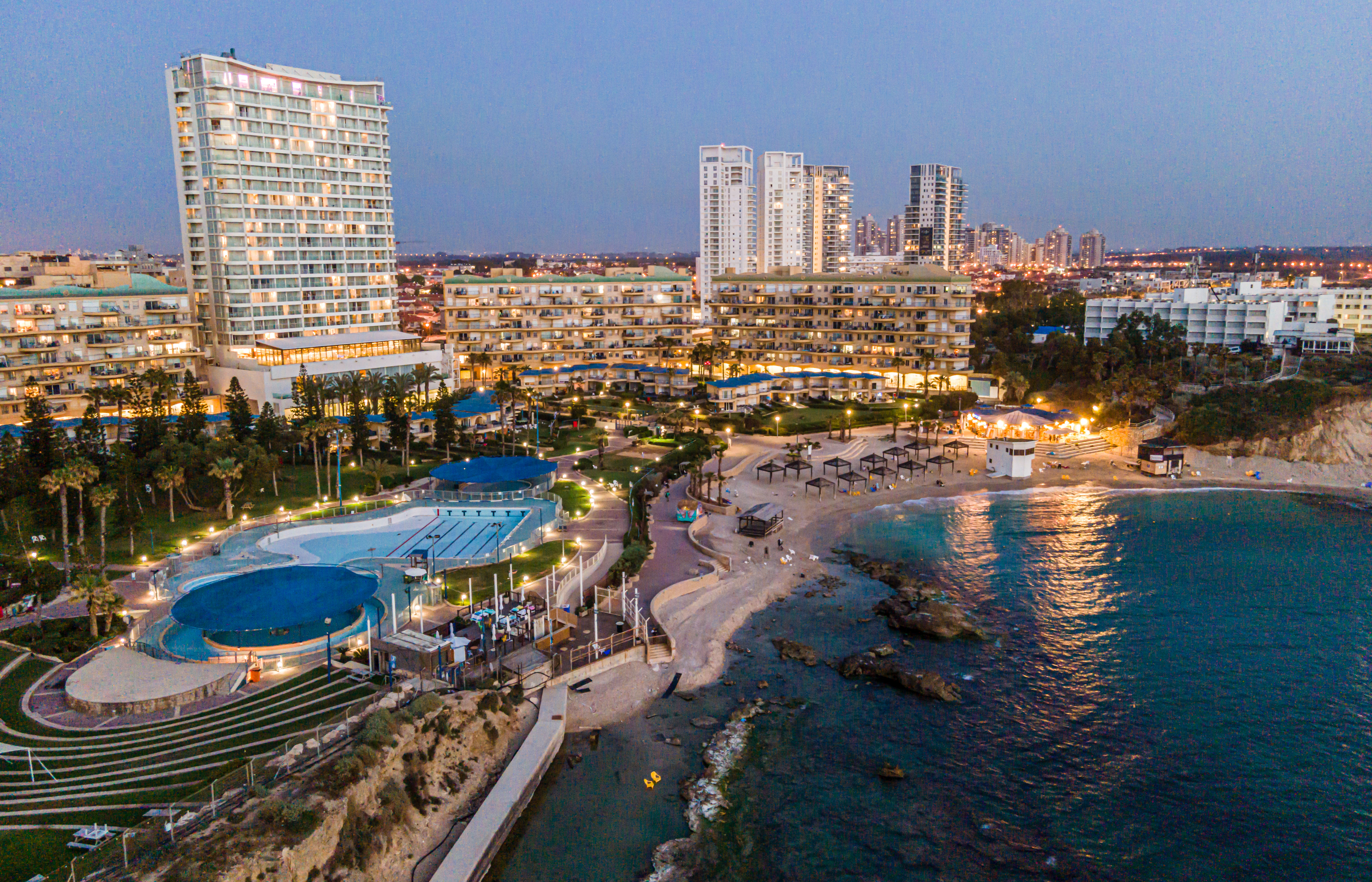
Giv'at Olga

Giv'at Olga (Hebrew: גבעת אולגה, lit. 'Olga's Hill') is a suburb of the Israeli city of Hadera. Giv'at Olga is bordered on the west by the coastal strip of the Mediterranean Sea, on the east stretches Highway 2, the new Mall Hof Village, and the Hadera West train station. The northern border of the neighborhood is Hadera River Park, and its southern border is Hasharon Park, Ein Hayam, another suburb of Hadera West, and the entrance to Tel Gador Nature Reservation and its beaches.

== History ==
The neighborhood began as a temporary settlement of the pioneers of Hadera, whose name was Kadima. In 1898, when the residents of Hadera were evacuated from their residence next to Khan Hadera, due to fever, to the Kadima place, believing that living by the sea would receive the sea breeze, and not the swampy air that existed in their surroundings. After about a year and a half, the residents realized that settling by the sea was not improving their situation, and they returned to their homes near the Khan in Hadera. They leave behind eucalyptus trees planted to dry up the swamps today in the southern part of the neighborhood.

The permanent settlement was founded in 1949. It was named after Olga Hankin, the wife of the Zionist activist Yehoshua Hankin, who built his home on a kurkar on the Sharon coastal ridge, following the Arab Revolt (1936-1939). The house was built on a hill, and from there the name of the neighborhood. In 1949, the official Giv'at Olga neighborhood was built around the house.

Giv'at Olga Neighborhood was built in stages:

First stage – housing Chinese immigrants. European immigrants who arrived in Israel via Shanghai. The housing was built by the settlers themselves, in order to reduce the cost of construction. 40 apartments were built, each 50 square meters, which included two rooms, a kitchen, and a bathroom. Date of construction: 1949–1950. Amidar then added single-story houses, with four apartments in each building. Each apartment reached 25 square meters. Over time, they added a second floor and united every two apartments for the use of one family.

Second stage – Giv'at Olga A (א) Hill (today west of the gas station). The residents were immigrants from Europe and the United States. Dated 1951–1952.

Third stage – Giv'at Olga B (ב). Built in the western part of the neighborhood. Most of the residents were immigrants from North Africa. The date 1952–1953.

Fourth stage – Giv'at Olga C (ג). Built in the northern part of the neighborhood. The residents are from Tripoli, Morocco and Romania.

Fifth stage – Giv'at Olga D (ד). Hill. This housing was intended for the last remnants of the transit. The date 1960–1964.

Sixth Stage – known as the "Eli Cohen" area. It was intended for families with many children among the residents of the neighborhood. Established between 1964 and 1965.

Seventh stage – housing "Azorim". Designed for young couples. Housing also absorbed immigrants from the Caucasus and Ethiopia. Its official name is the Ben-Gurion section. In the past, there was an absorption center on the site. Built from 1971 onwards, its structure was demolished.

Eighth stage – During the 1990s, vacation apartments were built in the northwest of the neighborhood, in a complex that bearing the name "Sea Village" (Kfar Hayam). The first hotel was built in the city of Hadera, which later became the Jacobs Resort Hotel by the Jacobs Resort.

Ninth Stage– At the beginning of the 2000s, construction began on the southern part of the neighborhood on land belonging to the founders of Chinese immigrants, who cultivated the area together with the veteran Hamdan family into a new neighborhood called Ein Hayam.

Tenth stage (planned) - According to the master plan for the city of Hadera Hadera/2020, which was deposited with the District Committee in March 2014, a residential complex with 10,000 housing units, hotels, promenades, commercial areas and five education campuses will be built north of Giv'at Olga. About 30,000 residents, which is double the size of the neighborhood in 2023.

== Landmarks ==
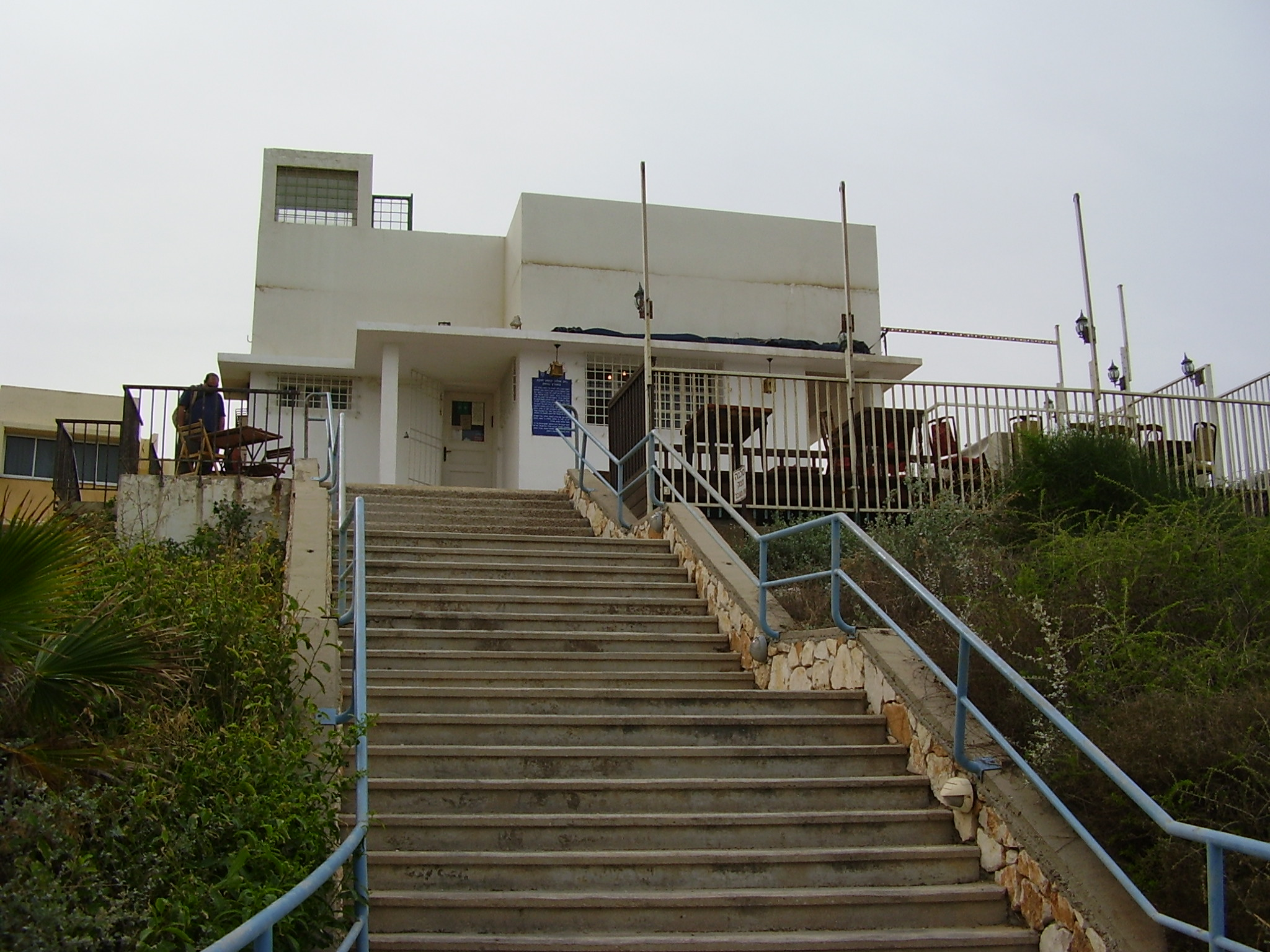
Hankin House

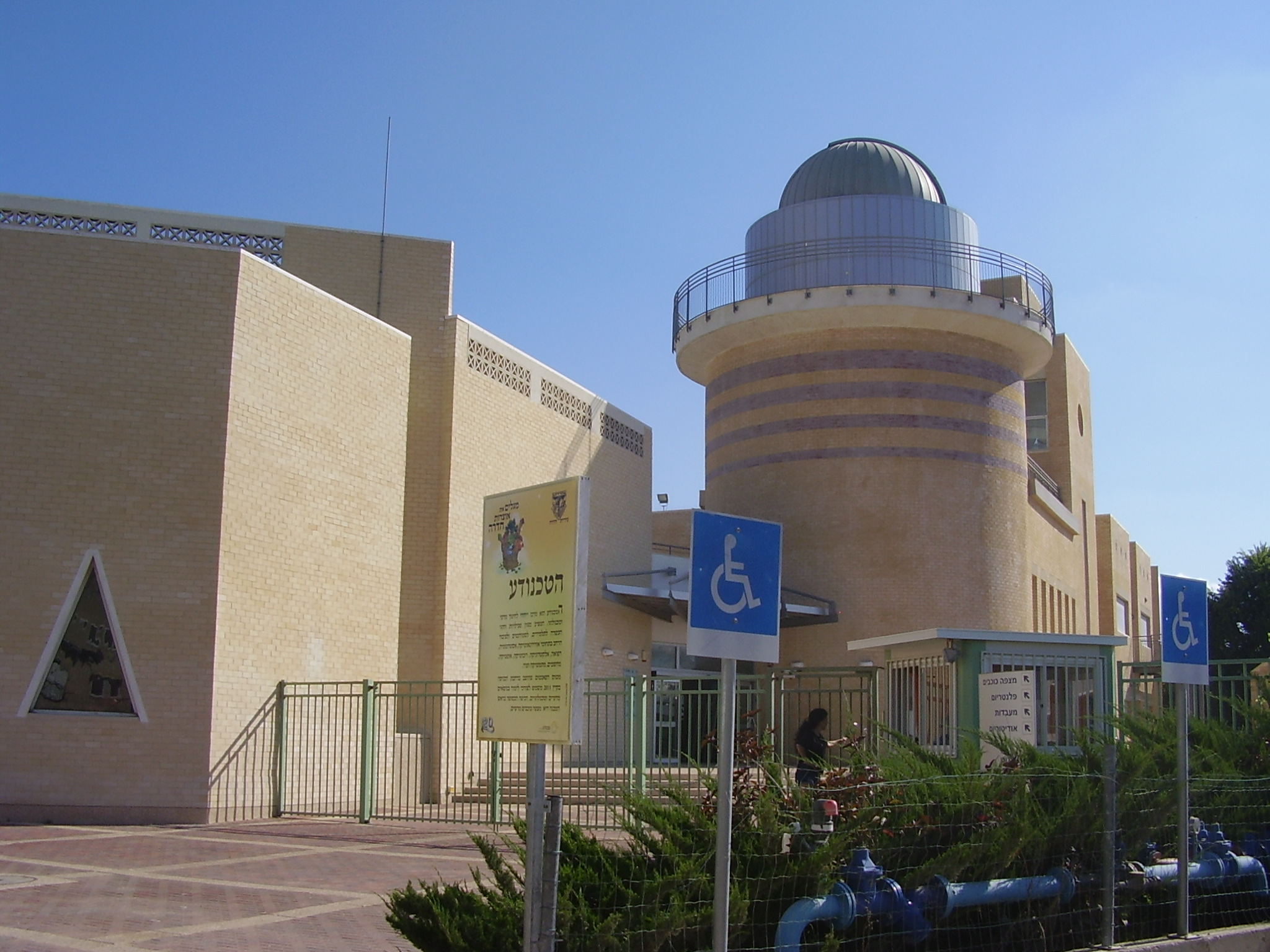
Technoda

Beit Hankin, built in the Bauhaus style, oversees Kfar Hayam beach of the Binyamin Bay. After years of neglect, a restaurant was opened there. In 2021, the site was shut down because the coastal cliff was crumbling and work began to stabilize it.

Giv'at Olga is the location of the Technoda an educational interactive museum of science, medicine and technology, equipped with a state-of-the-art telescope and planetarium.

Olga Beach and Tel Gador Nature Reserve is southwest of the neighborhood.

== Sports ==
F.C. Givat Olga was a local football club that operated in 1953–2015.

== Notable residents ==
- Yehoshua Hankin
- Olga Hankin
- Moshe Kahlon (born here in 1960), Israeli politician
- Or Kahlon (born here in 1988), Israeli dancer
- Tzuri Gueta
- Isaac Bachman

== See also ==
- Sharon Escarpment
