= Hadera Stream =

Coordinates: 32°25′31.3″N 34°59′24.76″E

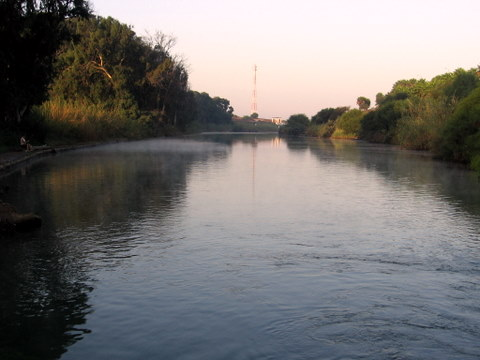
- Hadera Stream, views westward from the Israeli Coastal Highway
- Native name: נחל חדרה (Hebrew); نهر المفجر or نهر الأخضر (Arabic)

Location
- Country: Israel

Physical characteristics
- Length: 50 km (31 mi)

Basin features
- Progression: Dothan Valley → Mediterranean Sea

Hadera Stream (Hebrew: נחל חדרה, romanized: Naḥal Ḥadera), which was known as Nahr Akhdar (Arabic: نهر الأخضر, lit. 'green river'), is a seasonal watercourse in Israel. The modern names of the stream, and the Hadera city, originate from Wadi al-Khudeira (Arabic: وادي الخضيرة, lit. 'the valley of verdure'), the name of the upper portion of the river, whereas the lower portion was also known as Nahr Mafjir (Arabic: نهر المفجر, lit. 'the slowly flowing river').

The Crusaders called it the "Dead River" due to its sluggish character.

The Hadera River begins in the east in the Dothan Valley near the Bull Site in Samaria, and flows west in many twists and turns north of Mevo Dotan, between Hermesh in the north and Nazla al-Sharqiyah in the south, South of Baqa ash-Sharqiyya and Baqa al-Gharbiya and between Maor and Sde Yitzhak to the connection point between Nahal Yitzhak and Nahal Iron south of Talmei Elazar. The stream flows towards west at the north of Hadera and pours into the Mediterranean Sea within the Hadera River Park, a few dozen meters south of the Orot Rabin power station at the north of Hadera west.

The Hadera River Park, which is located between Givat Olga at Hadera-West and the Orot Rabin (Hadera) power plant, is a 750-dunam park that holds a 40-metre-wide creek banked by a 1.3-km-long promenade. A dam is being constructed where the water park meets the Coastal Highway and is supposed to prevent the rehabilitated section of the stream from being polluted by water from the watercourse itself.

== See also ==
- List of rivers of Israel
