= Kahlon =

Kahlon is a surname. Other spellings of this name include Cahlon. The name has multiple origins including Hebrew, Punjabi (Jat), Indo-Scythian, German and Irish.

== List of notable people ==
Notable people with include:

- Maharani Preneet Kaur Daughter of Sardar Gian singh Kahlon an Indian civil services officer and wife of King Amarinder Singh of Patiala (Former Chief Minister of Punjab, India)
- Moshe Kahlon (born 1960), Israeli politician
- Nirmal Singh Kahlon (1942–2022), Indian politician
- Or Kahlon, Israeli television personality
- Ravi Kahlon (born 1979), Indo-Canadian politician
- Tamir Kahlon (born 1987), Israeli soccer player
- Viki Kahlon (born 1993), Israeli soccer player

== See also ==
- Kahlon, SBS Nagar, village in Punjab, India
