= Hadera =

Hadera חֲדֵרָה
- City

Hebrew transcription(s)
  - ISO 259: Ḥdera
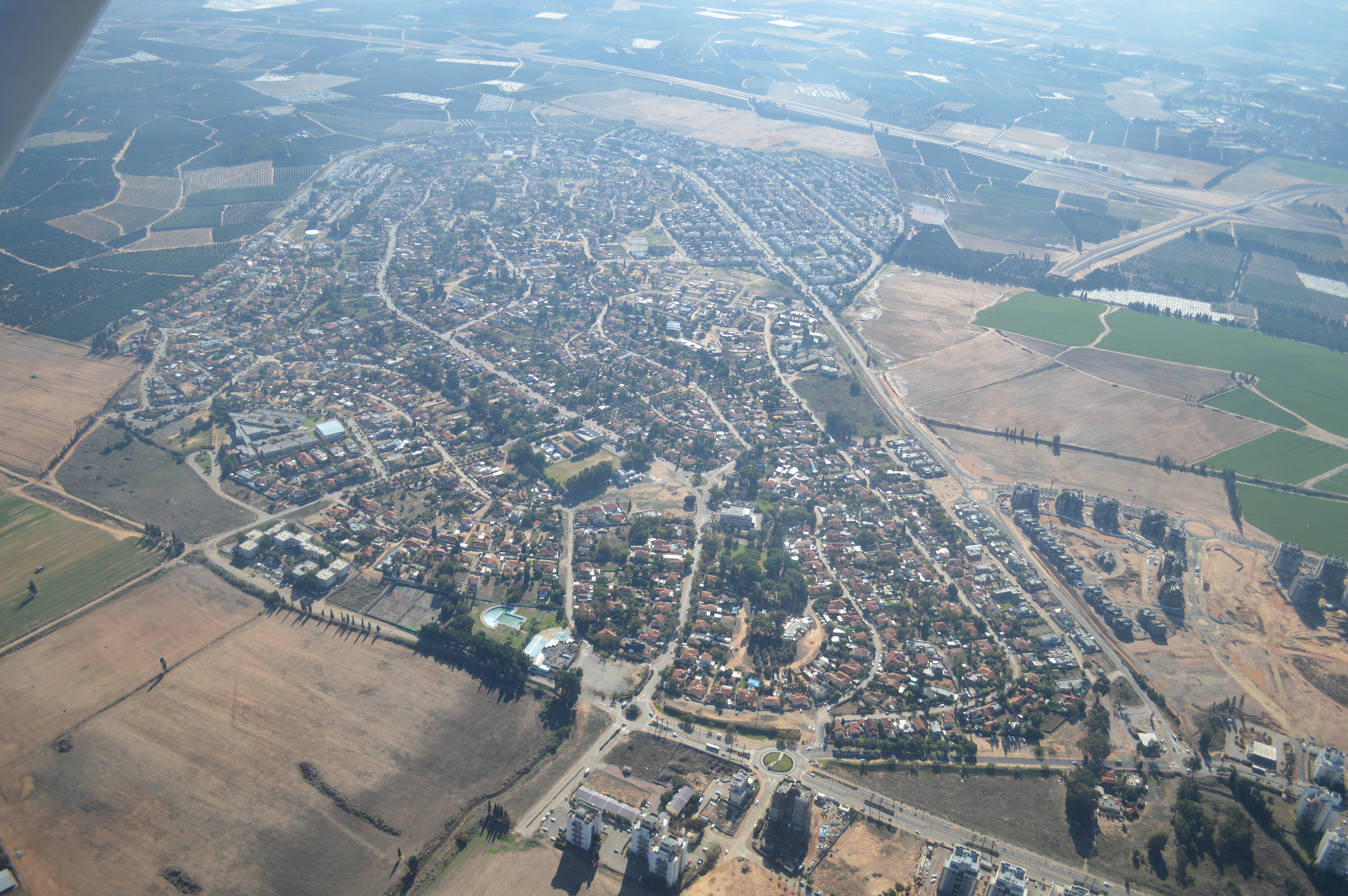
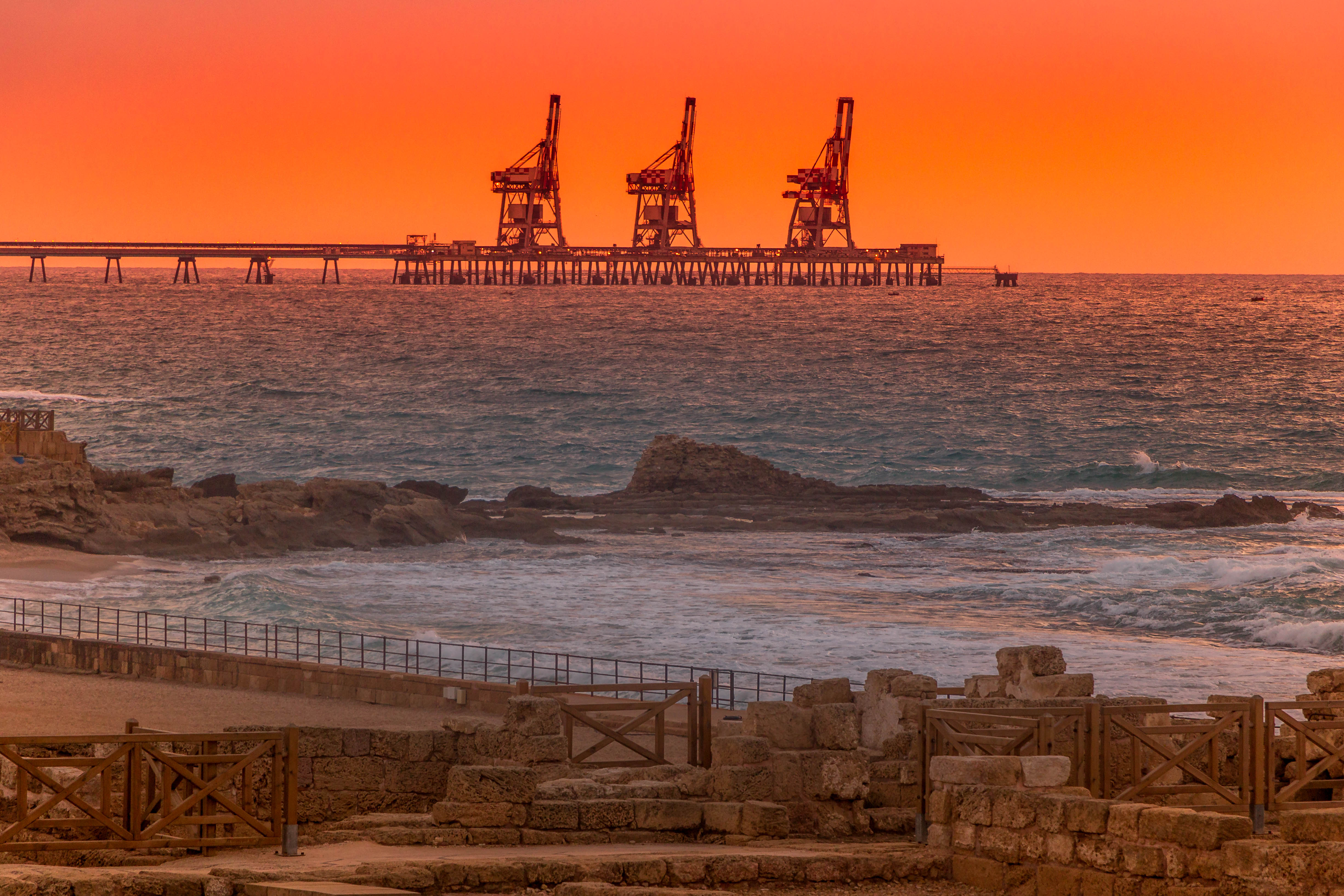
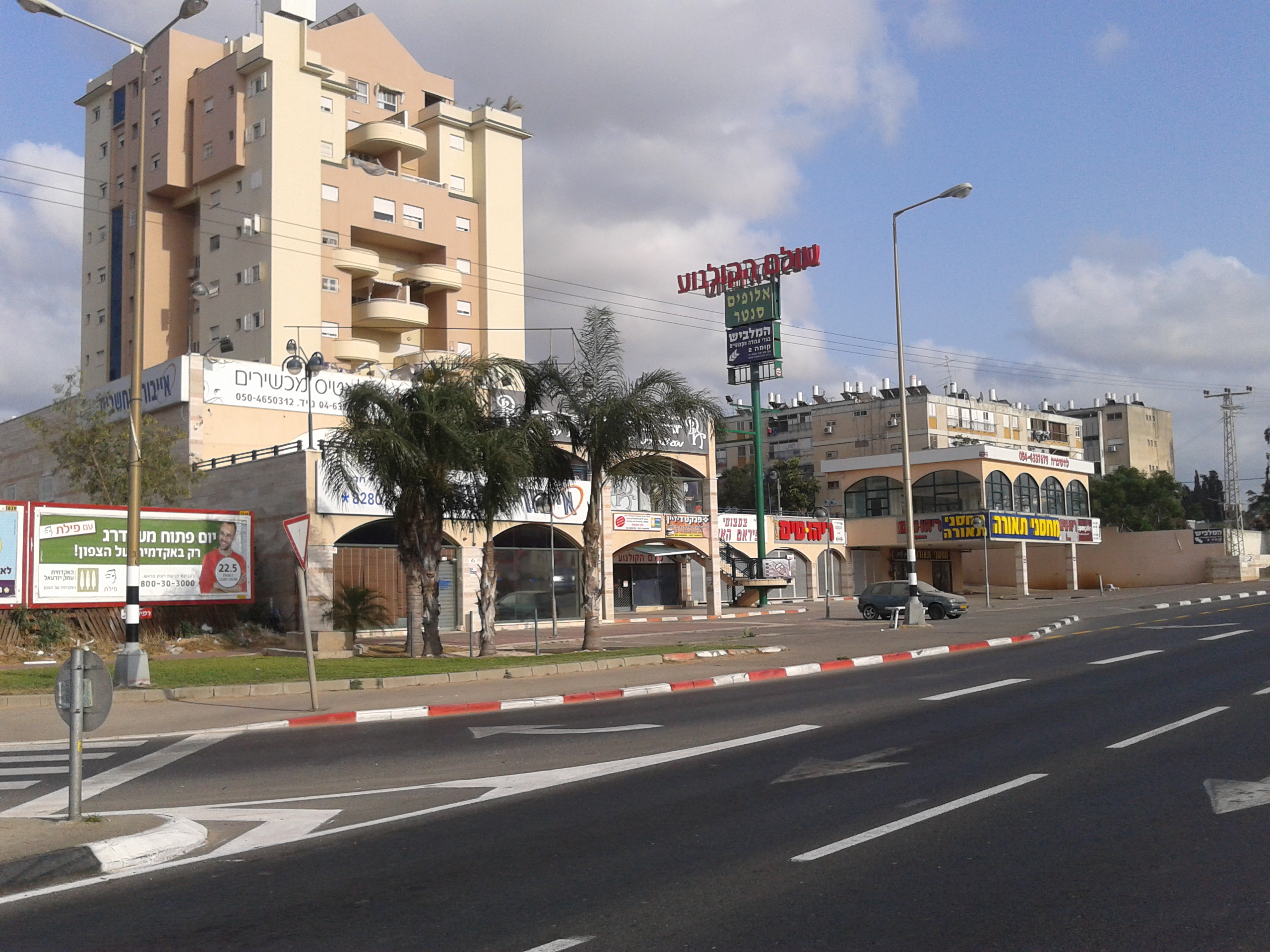
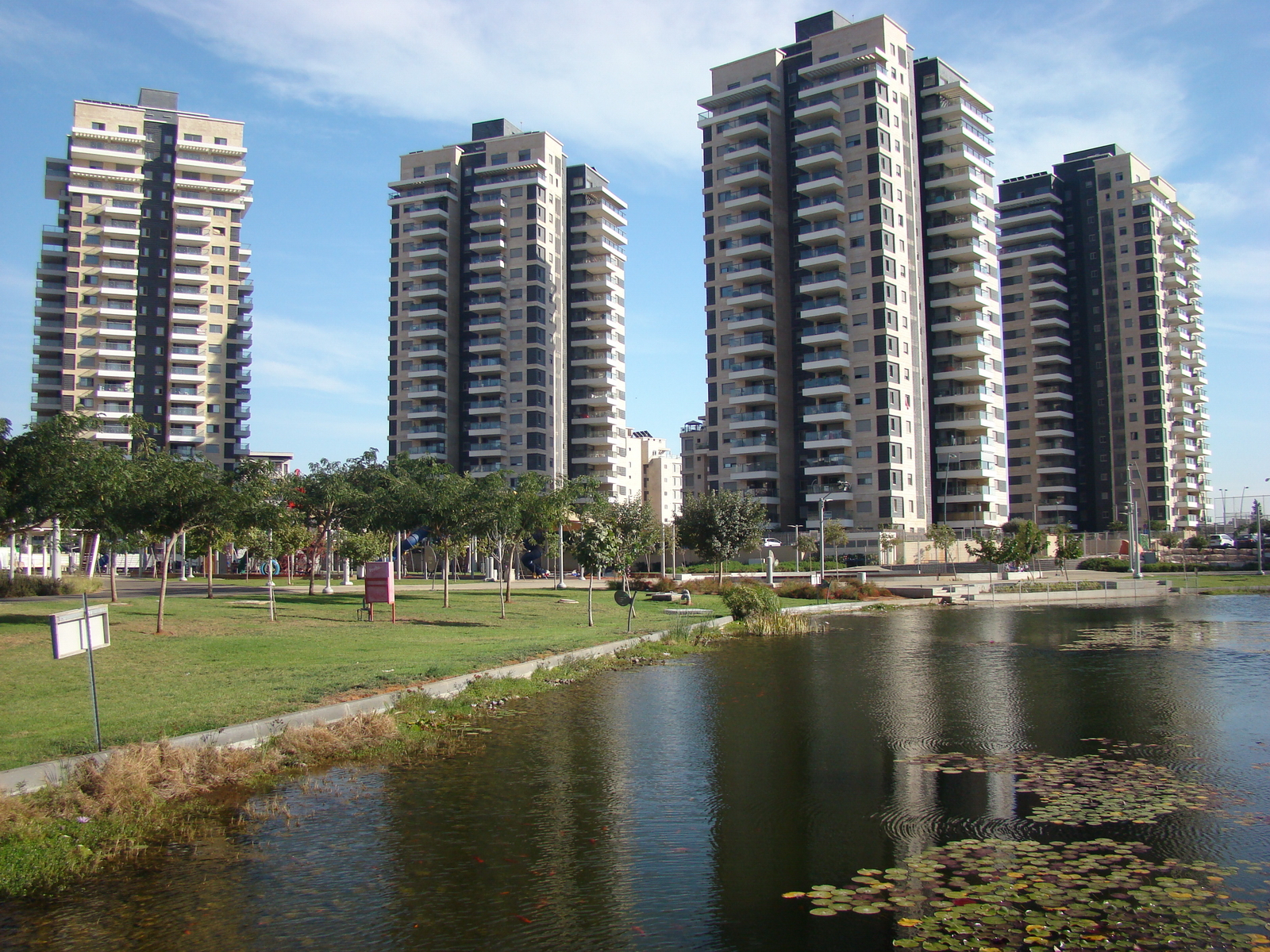
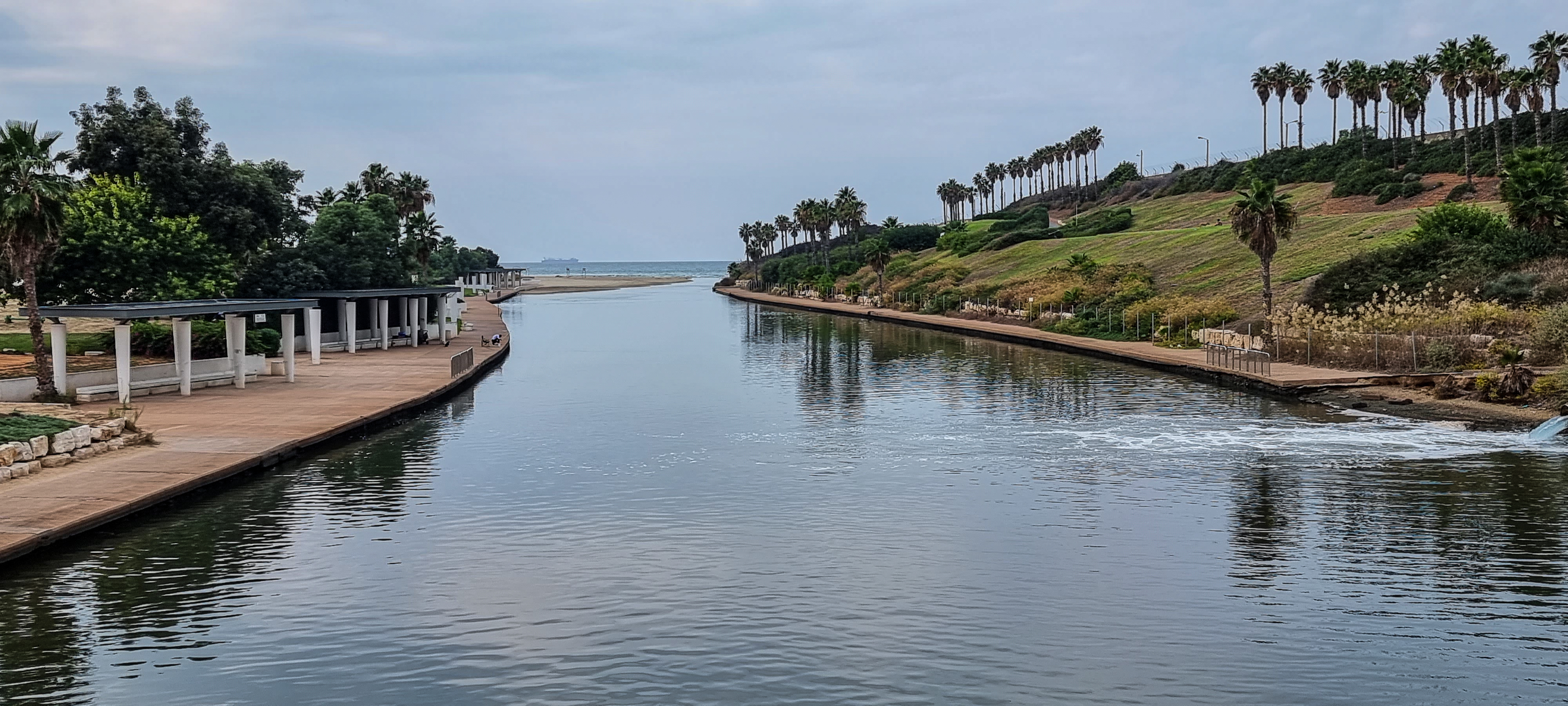

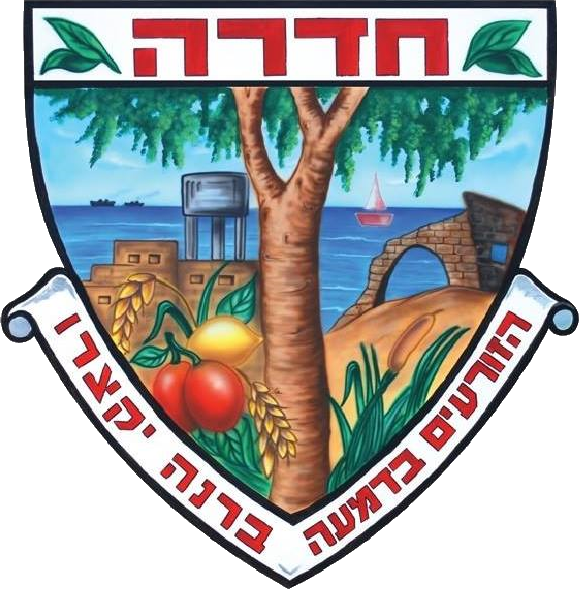
- Coat of arms

- Location within Haifa region of Israel Location within Israel
- Coordinates: 32°27′N 34°55′E
- Country: Israel
- District: Haifa
- Subdistrict: Hadera
- Natural Region: Hadera
- Founded: 1891; 135 years ago

Government
  - Mayor: Nir Ben Haim

Area
  - Total: 53,000 dunams (53 km^{2}; 20 sq mi)

Population (2024)
  - Total: 107,974
  - Density: 2,000/km^{2} (5,300/sq mi)

Ethnicity
  - Jews and others: 99%
  - Arabs: 1%
- Website: www.hadera.muni.il

Hadera (Hebrew: חדרה, pronounced [χadeˈʁa]) is a city located in the Haifa District of Israel, in the northern Sharon region, approximately 45 kilometers (28 miles) from the major cities of Tel Aviv and Haifa. The city is located along 7 km (5 mi) of the Israeli coastal plain. The city's population includes a notable community of post-Soviet and Ethiopian aliyah arrivals. In 2024 it had a population of 107,974.

Hadera was established in 1891 as a farming colony by members of the proto-Zionist group Hovevei Zion, from Lithuania and Latvia. By 1948, it was a regional center with a population of 11,800. In 1952, Hadera was declared a city, with jurisdiction over an area of 53,000 dunams. The population significantly increased during the 1990s as a result of immigration from the ex-USSR and from Ethiopia.

== History ==
=== Ottoman era ===
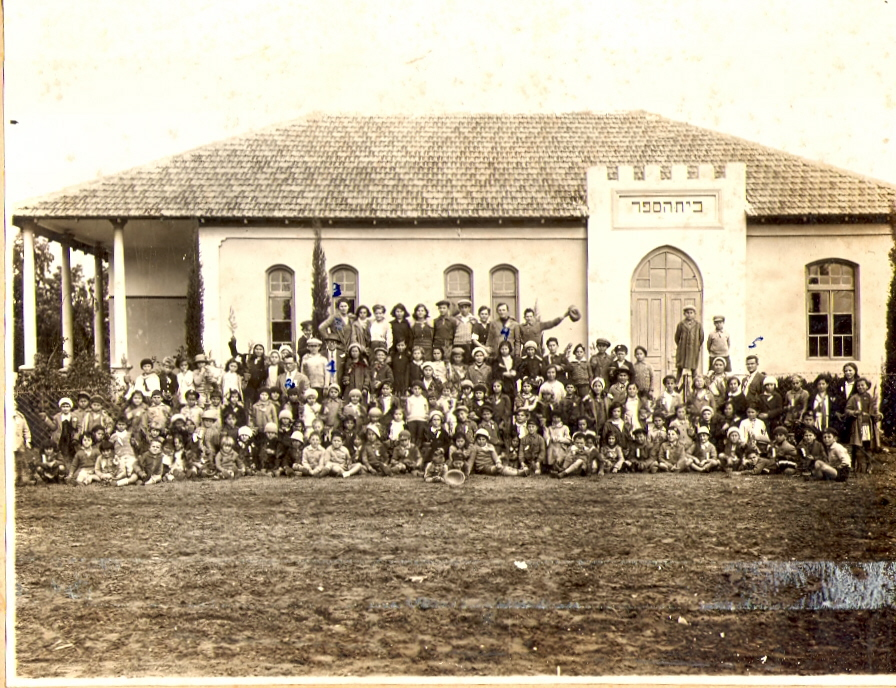
Jewish school in Hadera, 1931

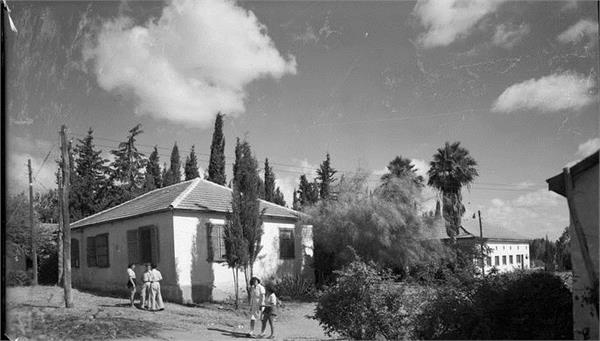
Hadera, 1940

Hadera was founded on 24 January 1891, in the early days of modern Zionism by Jewish immigrants from Lithuania and Latvia on land purchased by Yehoshua Hankin, known as the Redeemer of the Valley. The land was purchased from a Christian effendi, Selim Khuri. This was the largest purchase of land in Eretz Israel by a Zionist group, although the land was of low quality and mostly swampland. The only inhabitants prior to the purchase were a few families raising water buffaloes and selling papyrus reeds. The village was named after Wadi al-Khudeira (Arabic: وادي الخضيرة, lit. 'the valley of verdure'), as the nearby section of Hadera Stream was known. Earlier, the whole Hadera Stream had been known as Nahr Akhdar (Arabic: نهر الأخضر, lit. 'green river').

The Crusaders called the location Lictera. There is a hypothesis that this is a version of an Arabic name, el-Khudeira, but this is unproven. From the outset, attempts were made to pick instead a Hebrew name for the new settlement. About half a year after it was founded, rabbi Ya'akov Goldman reported on an event in "the moshav of Hadere, that is, Hatzor". The name Liktera was in preferential use by the British military during World War I.

In the end of the nineteenth century, the region of Hadera was populated by three immigrant groups – Circassians, Bosnians and Russian Jews. These transnational colonists joined what was, in Roy Marom's words, "a sparsely populated coastal plain inhabited by Arabic-speaking highland peasants and nomads of Turkmen, Nubian, Egyptian and of Arabian-Peninsular descent". Marom further notes that in 1871 Ottoman authorities inspected Khirbet al-Khudeira, and found it 'empty of inhabitants and lacking resident peasants who are eligible to purchase it in return for the payment of land registration fees". Selim al-Khoury, a Christian merchant from Haifa, purchased Kh. al-Khudeira, together with 3000 hectares of land, and established an agricultural estate among the ruins. In 1890, al-Khoury sold al-Khudeira to Yehoshua Hankin (1864–1945).

Baron Edmond James de Rothschild's surveyor, Yitzhak Goldhar, claimed that Hadera was founded on the site of the former town called Gedera of Caesarea (Hebrew: גדרה של קיסרין), as mentioned in Tosefta Shevi'it, ch. 7. Benjamin Mazar preferred to locate ancient Gador, formerly known as Gedera by Caesaria, at Tell Ahḍar ("green hill"), later known as Tell esh Sheikh Ziraq and currently as Tel Gador, on the coast south of Giv'at Olga. Others say that the ancient Gadera should be identified with Umm Qais or with al-Judeira.

The first Jewish settlers lived in a building known as the Khan near Hadera's main synagogue. The population consisted of ten families and four guards. In 1896 Baron Rothschild paid for "hundreds of black labourers" from Egypt "to dig the broad and deep trenches" needed to drain the swamps. They "died in scores". Old tombstones in the local cemetery reveal that out of a population of 540, 210 died of malaria. Therefore, a Bible verse from the Psalms (Tehillim) was inscribed in the city's logo: "Those who sow in tears, will reap with songs of joy." (Ps 126:5) Hashomer guards kept watch over the fields to prevent incursions by the neighboring Bedouin.

By the early twentieth century, Hadera had become the regional economic center. In 1913, the settlement included forty households, as well as fields and vineyards, stretching over 30,000 dunams.

=== British Mandate ===
In the 1922 census of Palestine conducted by the British Mandate authorities, Hadera had a total population of 540: 450 Jews, 89 Muslims, and 1 Christian. Land disputes in the area were resolved by the 1930s, and the population had grown to 2,002 in 1931. Free schooling was introduced in the city in 1937 in all schools apart from the Histadrut school.

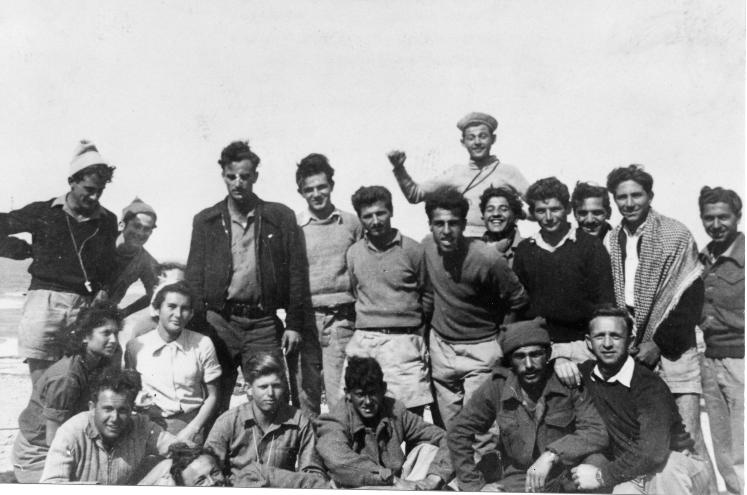
Members of Yiftach Brigade 1st Battalion, "D" company stationed at Givat Olga. 1948

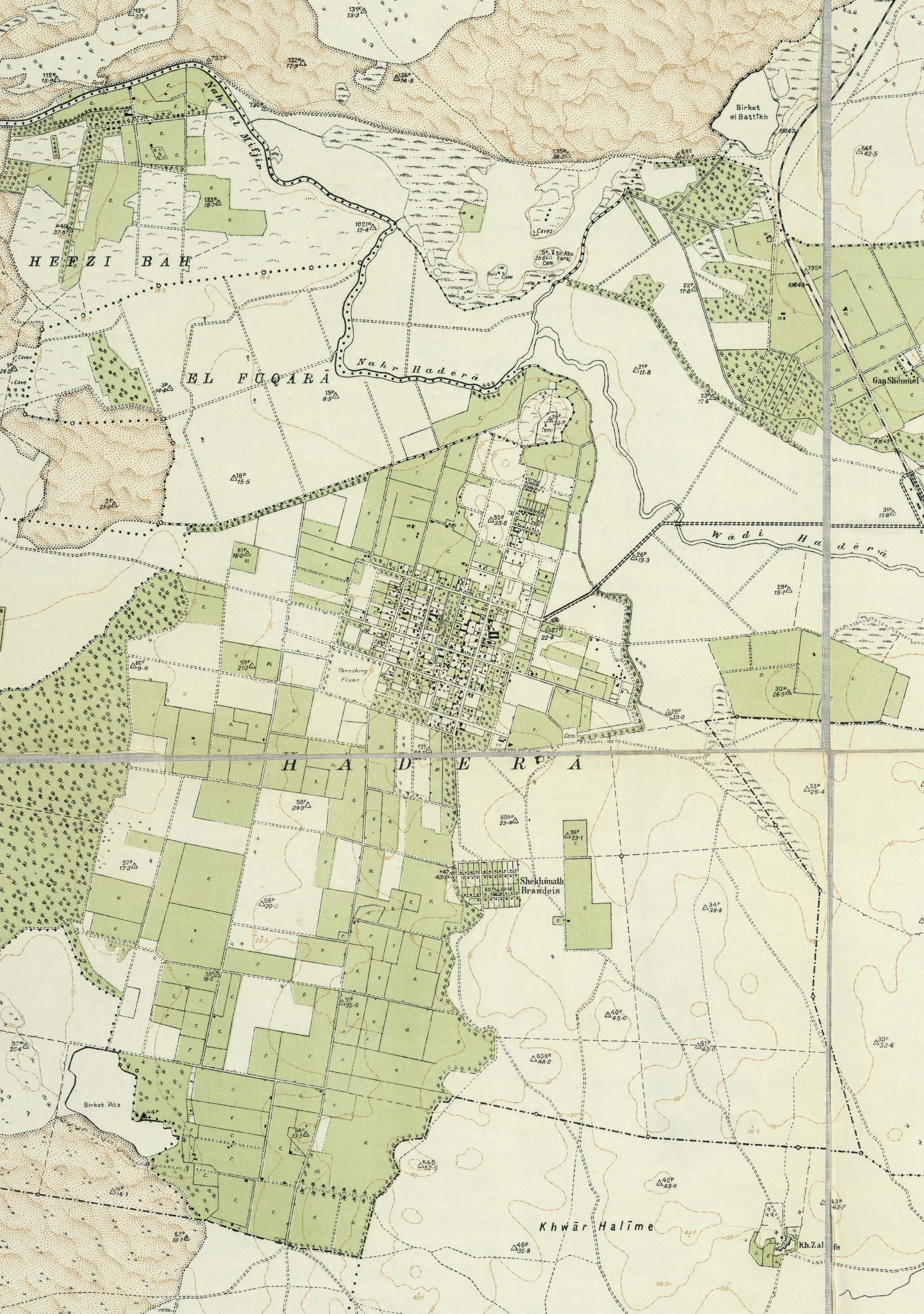
Hadera 1932 1:20,000

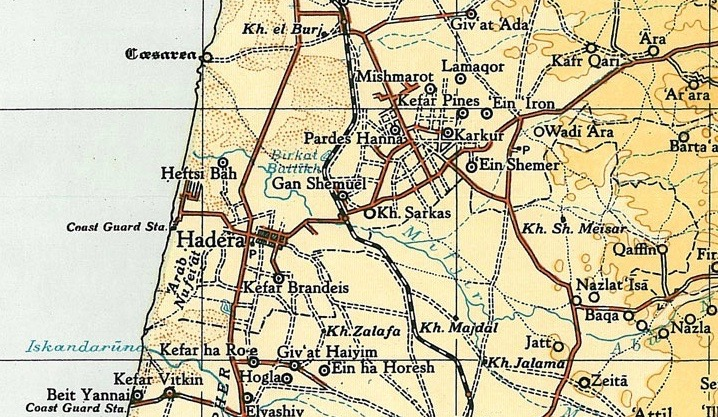
Hadera 1945 1:250,000

=== State of Israel ===
After the 1948 War, the north-western part of Hadera (including "Newe Chayyim") expanded on the land which had belonged to the depopulated Palestinian village of Arab al-Fuqara.

Hadera's population increased dramatically in 1948 as immigrants flocked to the country. Most of the newcomers were from Europe, though 40 Yemenite families settled there, too. In 1953, Israel's first paper mill opened in Hadera. Financed by investors from Israel, United States, Brazil and Australia, the mill was designed to meet all of Israel's paper needs. New neighborhoods were built, among them Givat Olga on the coast, and Beit Eliezer in the east of the city. In 1964, Hadera was declared a city.

In the 1990s, large numbers of Russian and Ethiopian immigrants settled in Hadera. Hadera, considered a safe place by its inhabitants, was jolted by several acts of terrorism during the second intifada. On October 28, 2001, four civilians were killed when a terrorist opened fire on pedestrians at a bus stop. A massacre of six civilians at a Bat Mitzvah occurred in early 2002. A suicide bomber blew himself up at a falafel stand on October 26, 2005, killing seven civilians and injuring 55, five in severe condition. During the second Lebanon War, on August 4, 2006, three rockets fired by Hezbollah hit Hadera. Hadera is 50 miles (80 km) south of the Lebanese border and marked the farthest point inside Israel hit by Hezbollah.

In the 2000s, the city center was rejuvenated, a high-tech business park was constructed, and the world's largest desalination plant was built. New neighborhoods are under construction in the underdeveloped northeastern part of the city, and plans are under way for a large park, shopping malls and hotels with a total of 1,800 rooms.

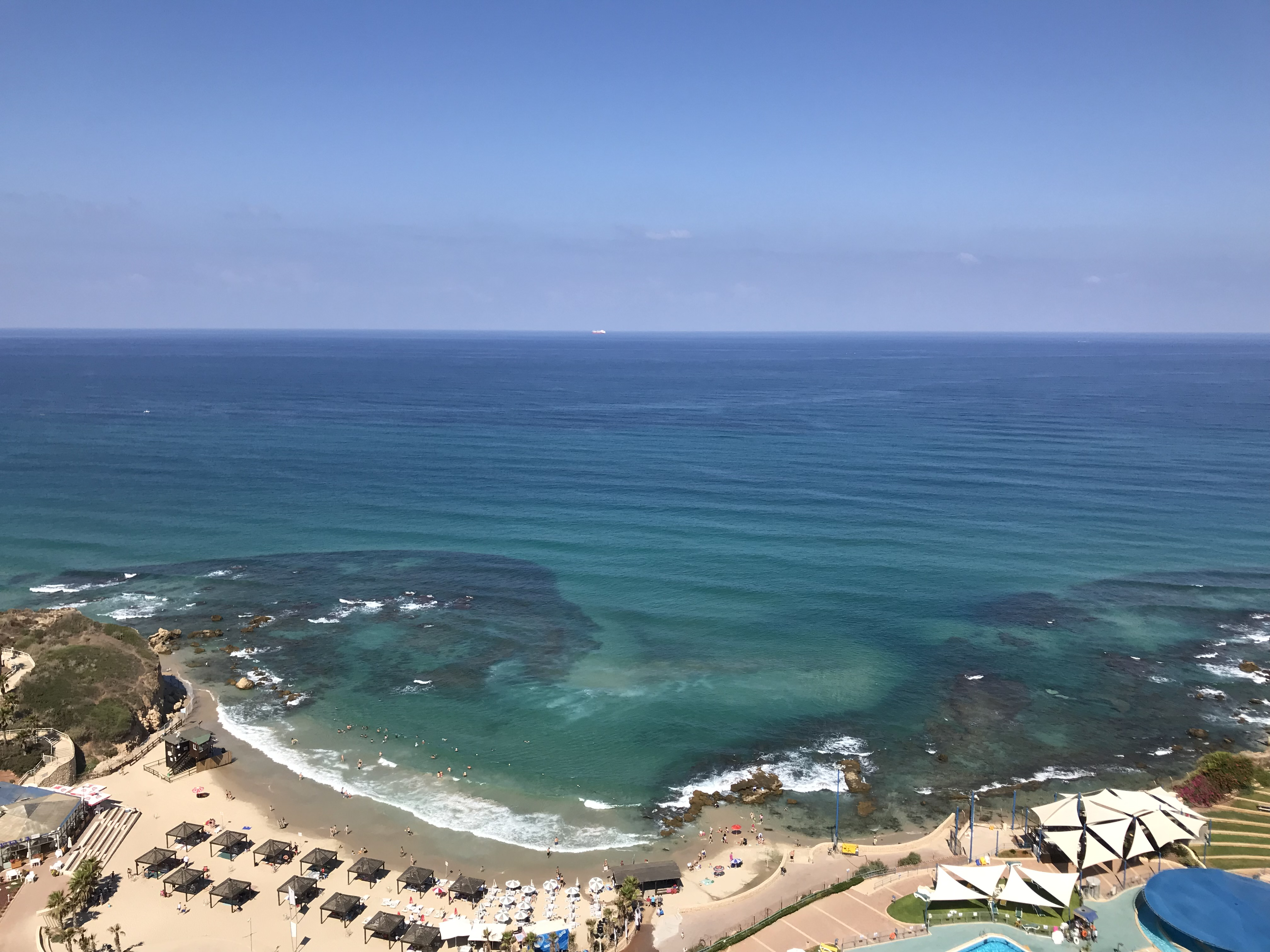
Beach in Hadera, 2017

The city is envisaged as a future vacation destination due to its closeness to the Galilee, beaches, and access to major highways.

== Geography ==
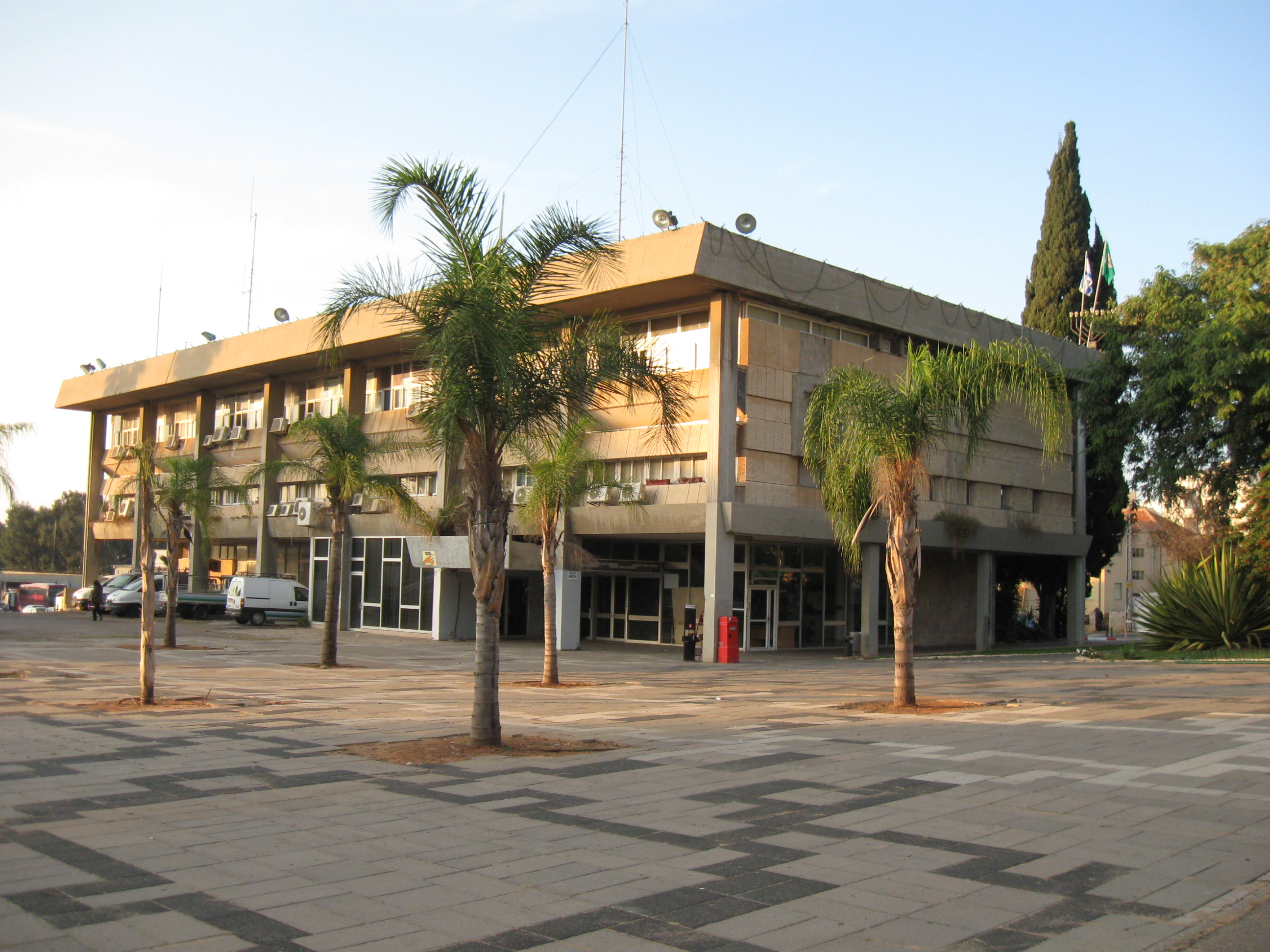
Hadera municipality building

Hadera is located on the Israeli Mediterranean coastal plain, 45 km (28 mi) north of Tel Aviv. The city's jurisdiction covers 53,000 dunams (53.0 km^{2}; 20.5 sq mi), making it the fourth largest city in the country. Nahal Hadera Park, a eucalyptus forest covering 1,300 dunams (1.3 km^{2}; 0.5 sq mi) and Hasharon Park are located on the outskirts of Hadera.

Hot water gushing from the Hadera power plant draws schools of hundreds of sandbar and dusky shark every winter from November to May, with researchers from the University of Haifa’s Morris Kahn Marine Research Station tagging some of the sharks each year. Scientists are researching the rare phenomenon, which is unknown in the vicinity. It is speculated that the water, which is ten degrees warmer than the rest of the sea, could be the attraction. On 21 April 2025, there was a shark attack resulting in the death of a swimmer in the waters off Hadera, with multiple dusky sharks involved, the collective predation in the case marking it as an extremely rare form of fatal shark attack. It was the first fatal shark attack in Israeli waters since the founding of the state in 1948, and the first occasion in the world in which dusky sharks were positively identified to have been the cause of a human fatality.

== Demographics ==
Historical population
Year	Pop.	±%
1972	32,600	—
1983	38,800	+19.0%
1995	60,400	+55.7%
2008	79,400	+31.5%
2022	103,847	+30.8%
2024	107,974	+4.0%

According to the Israel Central Bureau of Statistics, as of October 2013, Hadera had a population of 91,634 which is growing at an annual rate of 1.2%. As of 2003, the city had a population density of 1,516.6 per km^{2}. Of the city's population of 2013 of 91,634, approximately 23,407 were immigrants, many from Ethiopia.

According to a census conducted in 1922 by the British Mandate authorities, Hadera had a population of 540 inhabitants, consisting of 450 Jews, 89 Muslims and 1 Christian. Hadera has grown steadily since 1948, when the city had a population of 11,800. In 1955, the population almost doubled to 22,500. In 1961 it rose to 25,600, in 1972 to 32,200, and in 1983, to 38,700.

The median age in Hadera is 32.8, with 23,200 people 19 years of age or younger, 12.1% between 20 and 29, 14,100 between 30 and 44, 17,600 from 45 to 64, and 9,700, 65 or older. As of 2007, there were 37,500 males and 39,200 females.

In 2003, the ethnic makeup was 93.2% Jewish, 0.8% Arab and 6.0% other. In 2000, there were 27,920 salaried workers and 1,819 self-employed. The mean monthly wage in 2000 for a salaried worker was ILS 5,135, a real change of 8.0% throughout 2000. Salaried males had a mean monthly wage of ILS 6,607 (a real change of 9.0%) compared with ILS 3,598 for females (a real change of 3.1%). The mean income for the self-employed was 6,584. A total of 1,752 people received unemployment benefits and 6,753 received income supplements. In 2019, the total population was 97,334, of which 91.8% were Jewish and 0.9% were Arab.

== Education ==
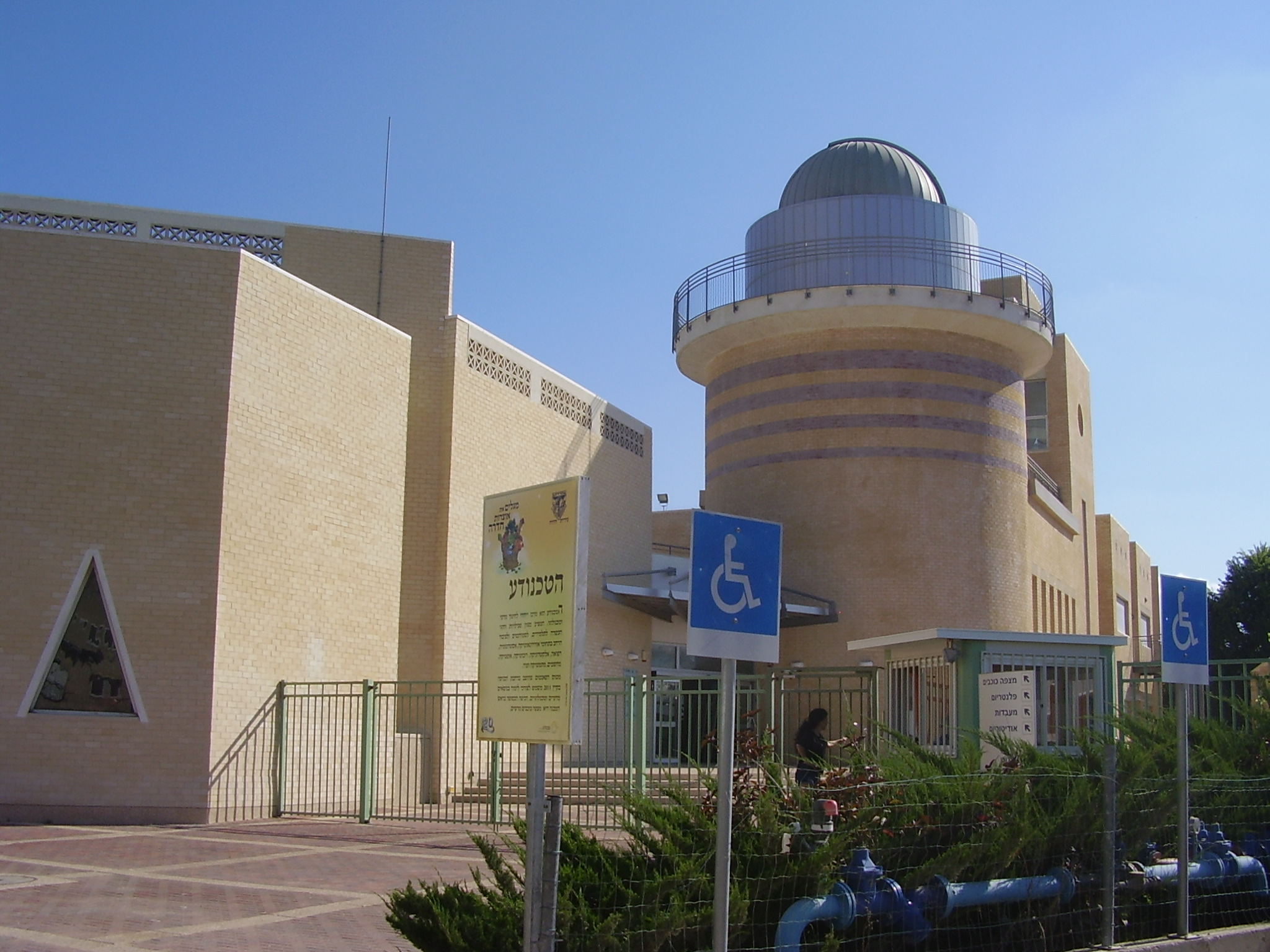
Technoda science and technology center

In 2001, 15,622 students were studying at 42 schools (24 elementary schools with 7,933 students, and 21 high schools with 7,689 students). A total of 57.5% of 12th graders were entitled to a matriculation certificate.

The Democratic School of Hadera, which opened in 1987, was the first of its kind in Israel. The Technoda, an educational center for science and technology equipped with a state-of-the-art telescope and planetarium, is located in Hadera's Givat Olga neighborhood.

== Transportation ==
Hadera lies along two main Israel Railways lines: the Coastal Line and the newly reopened Eastern Line. The Hadera West Railway Station is located in the west of the city and is on the Tel Aviv suburban line which runs between Binyamina and Ashkelon. The city's Hadera East Railway Station is located in the east of the city and is the terminus of the Eastern Railway from Rosh HaAyin–North Railway Station. The city center of Hadera is located near Israel's two main north–south highways; Highway 2, linking Tel Aviv to Haifa, and Highway 4. This made Hadera an important junction for all coastal bus transportation after 1948 and into the 1950s.

== Economy ==
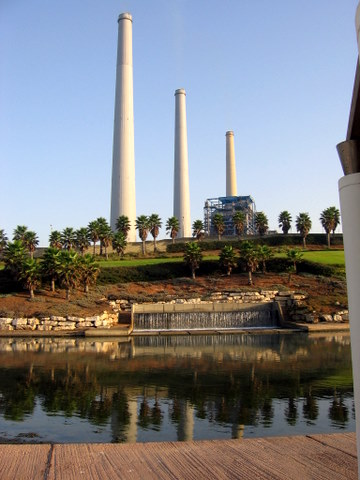
Orot Rabin power plant

Hadera Paper, established in 1953, continues to be a major employer in the city. The world's largest desalination plant of its type, was inaugurated in December 2009. Hadera is the location of the Orot Rabin Power Plant, Israel's largest power station.

== Healthcare ==
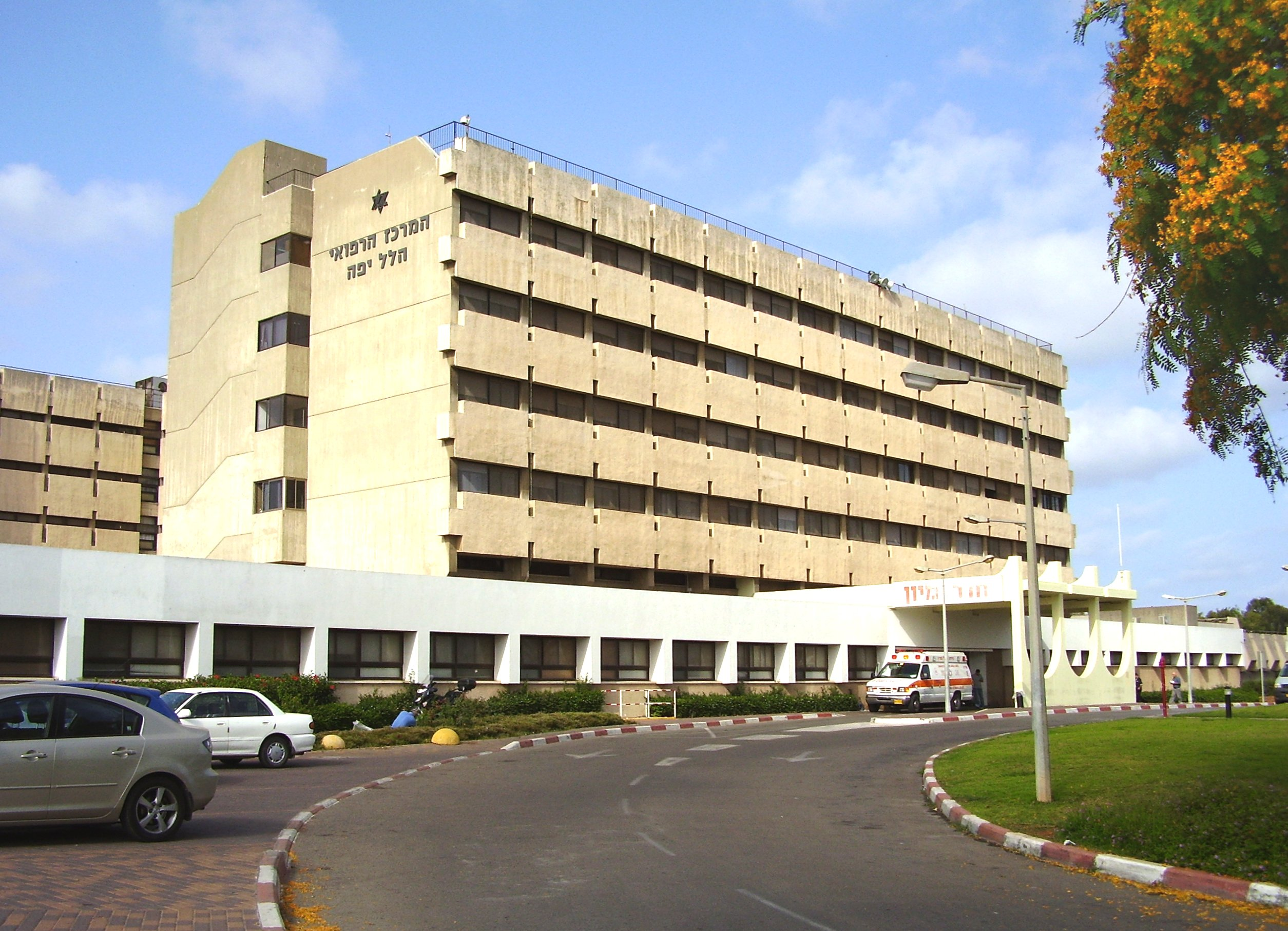
Hillel Yaffe Medical Center

Hadera is served by the Hillel Yaffe Medical Center.

== Neighborhoods ==
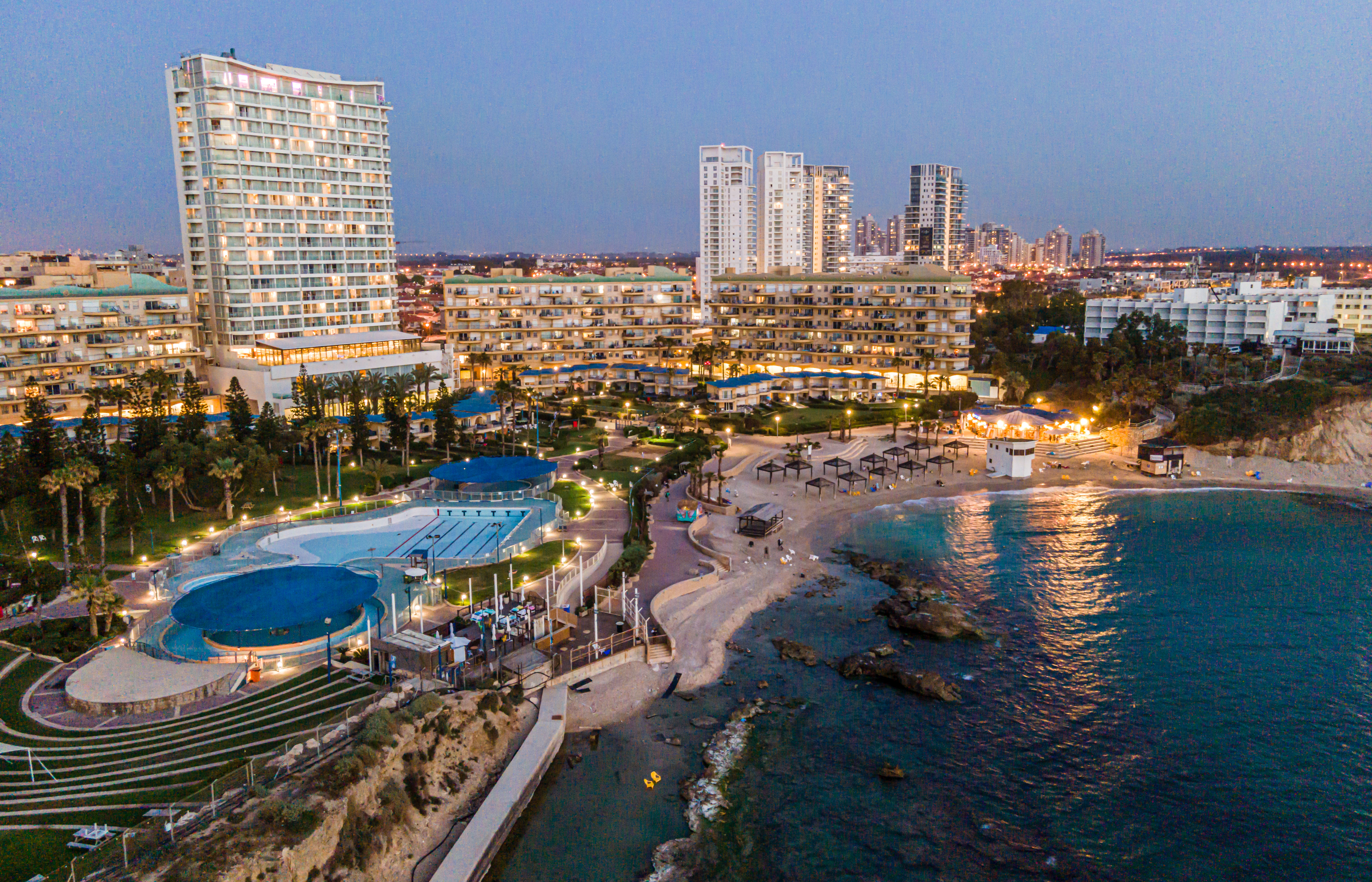
Giv'at Olga

Neighborhoods of Hadera include Givat Olga, Beit Eliezer, Kfar Brandeis, Haotzar, Hephzibah, Neve Haim, Nissan, Ephraim, Bilu, Klarin, Nahaliel, Shimshon, Shlomo, Pe'er, Bialik, Beitar and The Park.

- Beit Eliezer - named after Eliezer Kaplan, this neighborhood is in the eastern part of the city. The neighborhood was established in the 1950s. Most of the houses in the neighborhood had small farms, and the residents were mainly immigrants from Romania, Morocco and Yemen.
- Neve Haim - named after Haim Arlosoroff, this neighborhood is in the north of the city, and was founded in 1935 as a cooperative association. Most of the houses in the neighborhood had small farms. The center of the neighborhood is the water tower, which is still standing today.
- Giv'at Olga - named after Olga Hankin, the wife of the Zionist activist Yehoshua Hankin. It was founded in 1949 around the house Hankin built known as Olga Hankin's House.
- Nahaliel - a neighborhood on the northeastern side of the city center. Founded as a separate settlement by immigrants from Yemen and Aden back in 1912, and later annexed to the city.
- Ein Hayam - a new neighborhood that was established in the early 2000s in the southwest of the city, south of Givat Olga and north of the Gador nature reserve.
- Givat Bilu - a neighborhood of mainly immigrants from Yemen, who arrived after the establishment of the state in the "Operation Magic Carpet".
- Heftsiba - a small northern neighborhood, established in 1946. It was originally planned by the Palestine Land Development Company in 1939. The neighborhood is inhabited mainly by immigrants from Yemen. Near it the Heftsiba Farm is located.
- HaOtsar - its land was bought in the beginning of the 20th century by The Jewish Colonial Trust and the name of the neighborhood is derived from the Hebrew name of this trust. In the center of the neighborhood is the "Park Yehoshua" park, named Yehoshua Hankin, who bought the lands for the Trust.
- Kfar Brandeis – was founded as a rural village in 1927, and was named after Louis Brandeis. it was integrated into Hadera in 1951. The village retained its independence regarding water issues for many years but now is an integral part of the city.

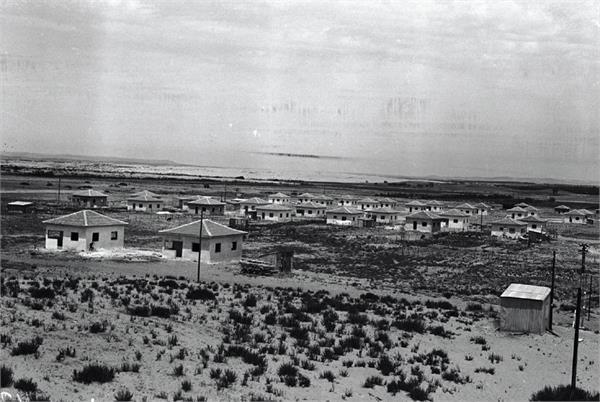
Neve Haim 1941

== Sports ==
Hadera is home to three current football clubs: Hapoel Hadera, which currently plays in Israeli Premier League after being promoted at the end of 2017/18 season. Beitar Hadera (playing in Liga Gimel Shomron) and the women's football club Maccabi Kishronot Hadera (playing in Ligat Nashim Rishona). In the past, the city was also home to Maccabi Hadera, Hapoel Nahliel and Hapoel Beit Eliezer.

The city is also represented in the Israeli Beach Soccer League. Its team, Hapoel Hadera, won the championship (under its previous name, Hadera's Princes) in 2008.

In Basketball, Maccabi Hadera's women's basketball team plays in second-tier Liga Leumit, while the club's Maccabi Hadera men's basketball team plays in third tier Liga Artzit.

== Voting Patterns ==
In the 2022 election, 58 percent of voters in Hadera voted for the parties of the right-wing coalition led by Benjamin Netanyahu, while 39 percent voted for the parties of the center-left coalition led by Yair Lapid and 0.4 percent voted for the Arab parties.

In the 2026 election, 53 percent of voters in Hadera voted for the parties of the right-wing coalition led by Benjamin Netanyahu, while 40 percent voted for the parties of the center-left coalition led by Gadi Eisenkot and 0.6 percent voted for the Arab parties. An additional 4.4 percent voted for the Reservists, and 1.6 percent voted for Amcha Yisrael. Voter turnout increased 17 percent from the 2022 election.

== Notable people ==
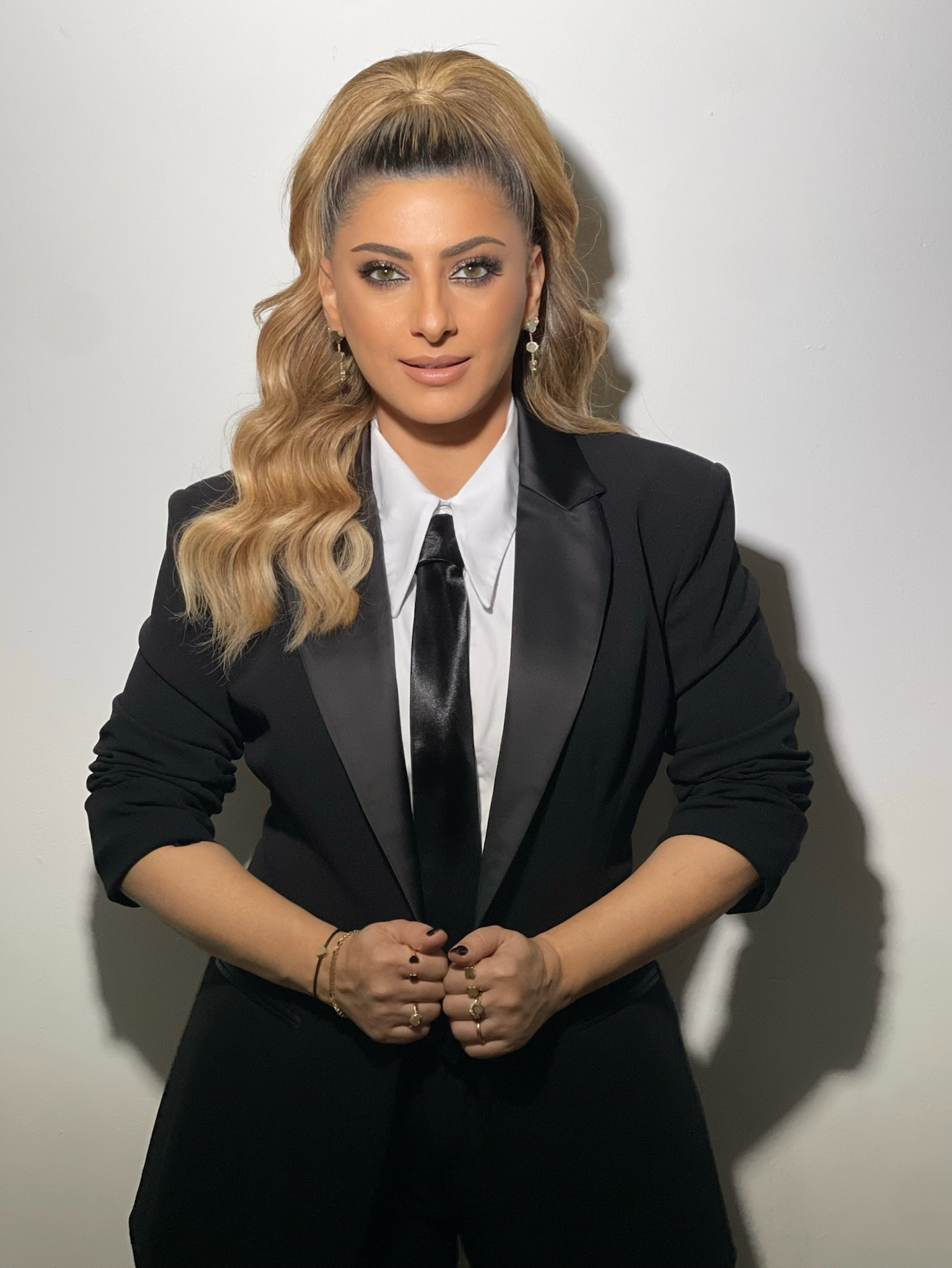
Sarit Hadad

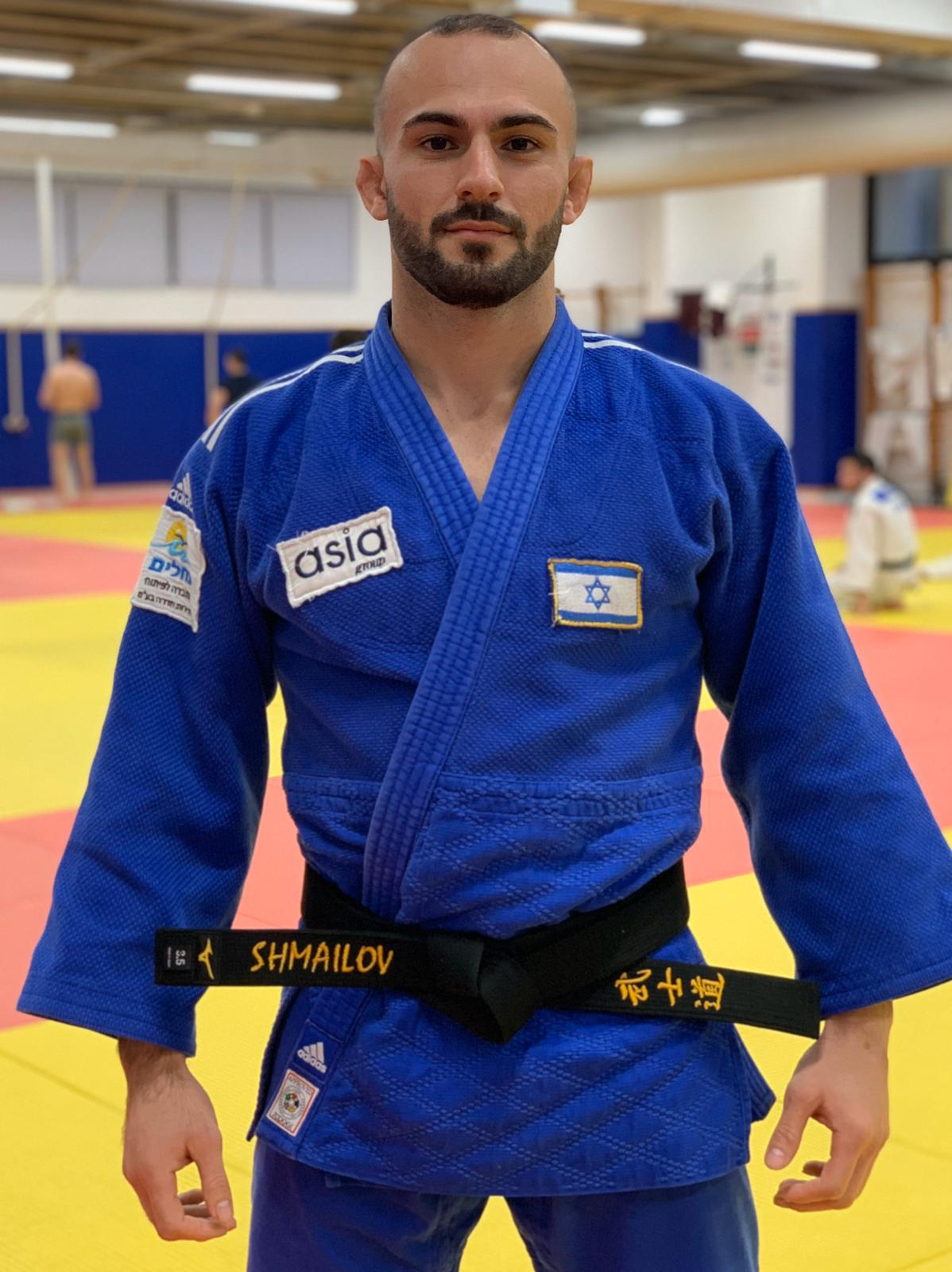
Baruch Shmailov

- Eldad Amir (born 1961), Olympic competitive sailor
- Mohamed Abu Arisha (born 1997), basketball player for Hapoel Be'er Sheva of the Israeli Basketball Premier League and the Israeli national basketball team
- Shimon Baadani (1928–2023), Sephardi rabbi, rosh kollel, and senior leader of the Shas party
- Avshalom Feinberg (1889–1917), spy
- Isaac Bachman (born 1957), diplomat
- Yossi Brodny (born 1971), politician and mayor of the city of Giv'at Shmuel
- Orna Grumberg (born 1952), computer scientist
- Yigal Carmon (born 1946), co-founder and president of MEMRI
- Amit Gershon (born 1995), basketball player
- Shlomo Bar-Aba (born 1950), comedian, actor, dubber and television host
- Aharon Gluska (born 1951), painter
- Shlomo Gronich (born 1949), singer, songwriter and pianist
- Ofra Harnoy (born 1965), Israeli-Canadian cellist
- Ilan Garibi (born 1965), origami artist and designer
- Tal Benyezri (born 1989), French-Israeli singer
- Tzuri Gueta (born 1968), designer
- Sarit Hadad (born 1978), singer, Israeli Eurovision Song Contest 2002 entrant
- Moshe Kahlon (born 1960), politician
- Shay Kakon (born 2002), Olympic sailor
- Elham Mahamid Ruzin (born 1990), Paralympic goalball player
- Yoel Sela (born 1951), Olympic competitive sailor
- Eliran Guetta (born 1975), basketball player
- Baruch Shmailov (born 1994), Olympic judoka
- Alon Stein (born 1978), basketball player and coach
- Herut Takele (born 1938), aliyah activist and prisoner of Zion from Ethiopia

== Major terrorist attacks ==
- 1994 Hadera bus station suicide bombing – Suicide bombing at a bus station, 4 killed and 30 injured.
- 2002 Hadera attack – Shooting attack, 6 killed and 33 injured.
- 2005 Hadera Market bombing – Suicide bombing in a market, 5 killed and 55 injured.
- 2022 Hadera shooting – 2 dead and 12 injured when terrorists affiliated with the Islamic State opened fire on a bus stop.
- 2024 Hadera stabbing attack – A mass stabbing left one dead, 5 in a critical condition, and 2 of the victims in a severe condition.

== Twin towns – sister cities ==
Hadera is twinned with:

- Besançon, France
- Big Spring, United States
- Charlotte, United States (2008)
- Derbent, Russia
- El Paso, United States (2015)
- Nuremberg, Germany (1995)
- Rizhao, China
- Tomar, Portugal

== See also ==
- Desalination by country#Israel
- Hadera Stream
