= Beit Eliezer =

Beit Eliezer (Hebrew: בית אליעזר) is a neighborhood in the city of Hadera, in the Haifa District of Israel. Located in the eastern part of the city, it is one of Hadera's oldest and largest residential neighborhoods.

== History ==
Beit Eliezer was established in the 1950s as a workers' neighborhood. It is named after Eliezer Kaplan, who served as Israel's first Minister of Finance. Its first residents were largely immigrants, including Jews from Yemen, Romania, and Morocco. In its early years, houses in the neighborhood were built with large plots of land that included small subsistence farms, giving parts of the neighborhood a rural character.

The neighborhood grew in stages over the following decades as further waves of immigration reached Hadera. A section known as Neve Eliezer was developed within Beit Eliezer, and in 1973 an additional area of prefabricated housing imported from Yugoslavia, locally referred to as "Yugoslav housing," was built. Following the large-scale immigration from the former Soviet Union in the 1990s, a further section known as "New House of Eliezer" was constructed; its streets were named after families associated with the founding of Hadera.

== Sports ==
The neighborhood was home to Hapoel Beit Eliezer F.C., a football club founded in 1952. The club spent most of its history in Israel's lower divisions, winning promotion to Liga Alef in 1977. It folded amid financial difficulties, was briefly revived in the 1980s, and was eventually merged into Hapoel Hadera in 2000.

== Notable buildings ==
The Beit Eliezer Community Center is a building located at a central corner of the neighborhood, constructed with sandstone facades.
