= Sharon Escarpment =

Mediterranean Sea escarpment in Israel

Coordinates: 32.400°N 34.883°E

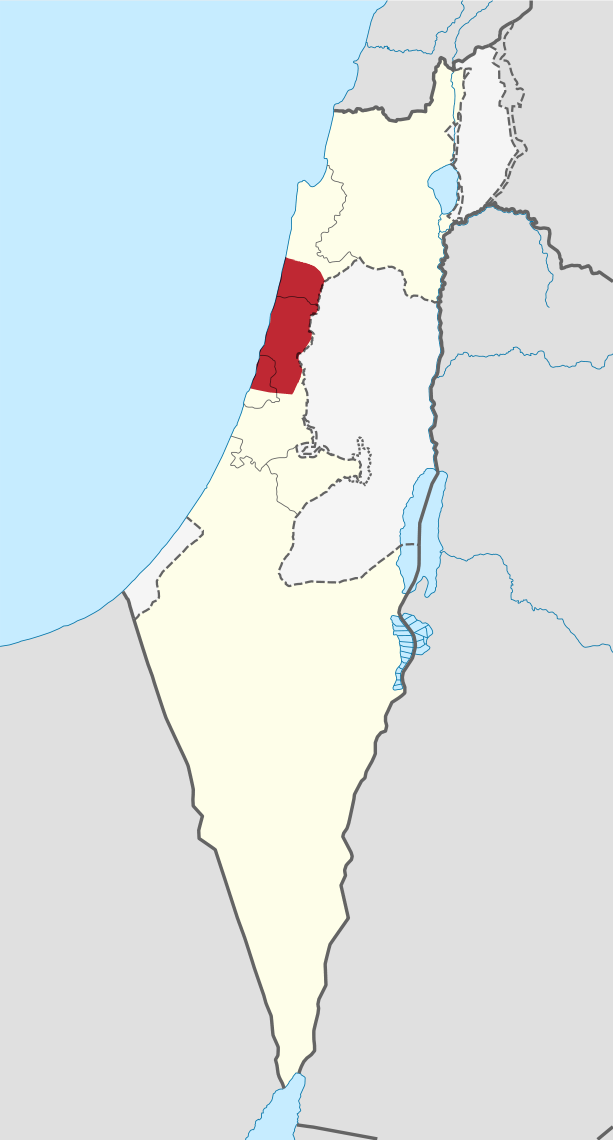
Sharon plain within the Israeli coastal plain

The Sharon Escarpment or Sharon Cliff is the escarpment in Israel that connects the level of the coastal plain with the level of the Mediterranean Sea beach and the continental shelf and stretches along the Sharon coastal ridge approximately between Giv'at Olga and Tel Aviv, i.e., along the Sharon plain.

The escarpment is up to 45m in height, of steepness 75-90°. Both the ridge and the escarpment are composed of alternating layers of kurkar (the local variety of sandstone) and loose palaeosol. The escarpment gradually moves eastward due to collapsing and slumping seawards. The separated slabs of kurkar slide downwards and crumble completely into fans of sand, swashed away by waves. The catchment area of the escarpment is visibly eroded by runoff, but this erosion is negligible compared to rockslides and slumps.

The escarpment is threatened by road building, sand quarrying, drainage, slope grading, and other uncontrolled tampering with the topography. Coastal erosion of the Israeli coastal plain endangers ancient cities, such as Ashkelon, Yavne-Yam, Jaffa, Apollonia–Arsuf, Caesarea, Atlit, Akko and Achziv.

The ridge was formed during the Late Pleistocene and the cliff developed when at about 7,500 years Before Present (BP) the sea level reached the western edge of the current ridge. Now this edge is at about 8 m. below the sea level.

Galil and Zviely suggest that over these 7,500 years the cliff retreated for about 730m, i.e., at the rate about 9.7 cm. per year.

== Gallery ==
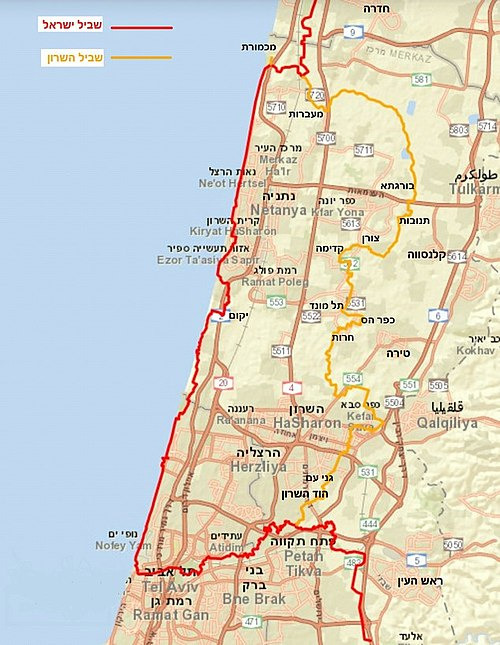
Sharon Trail

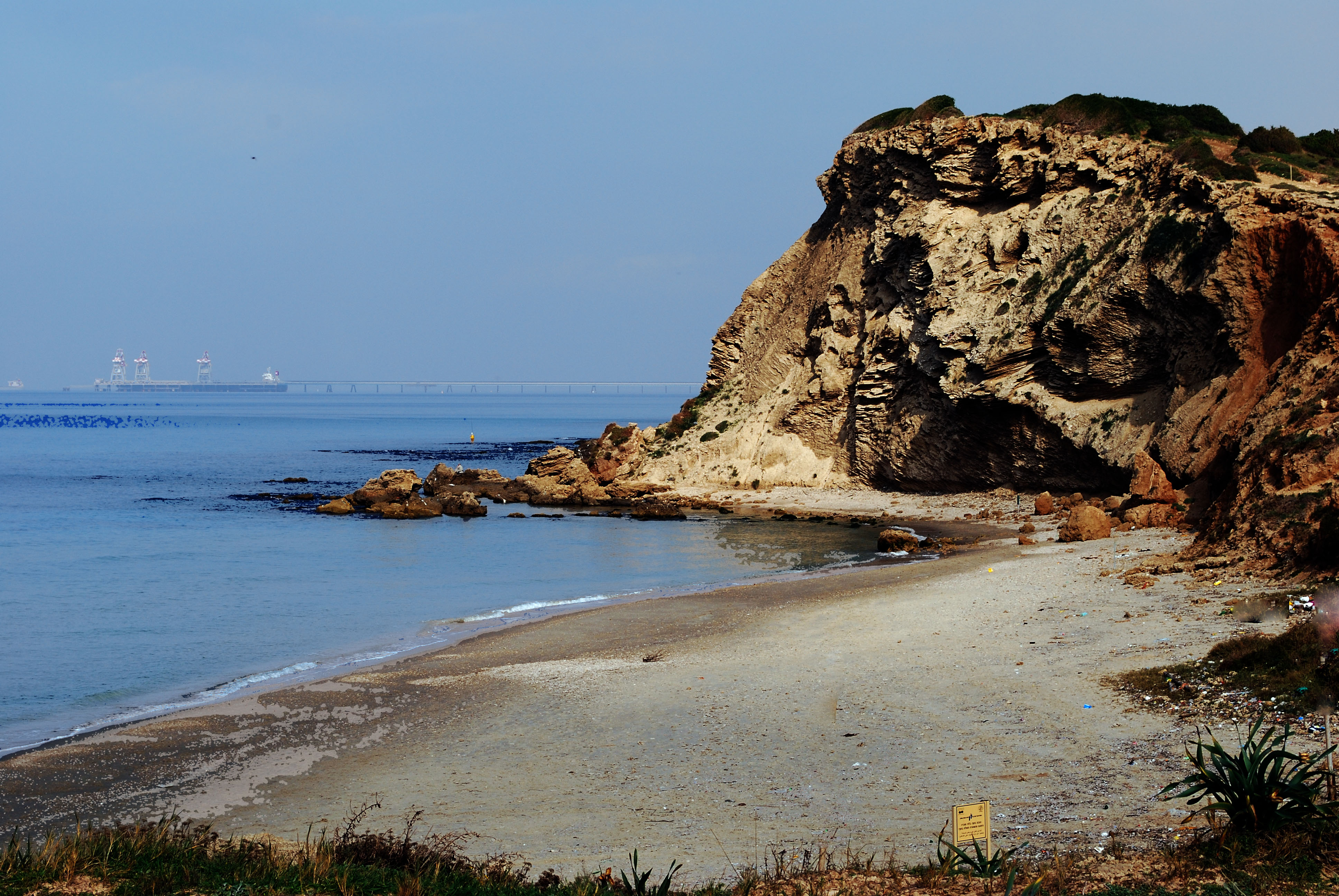
A rock in the Olga Beach Nature Reserve

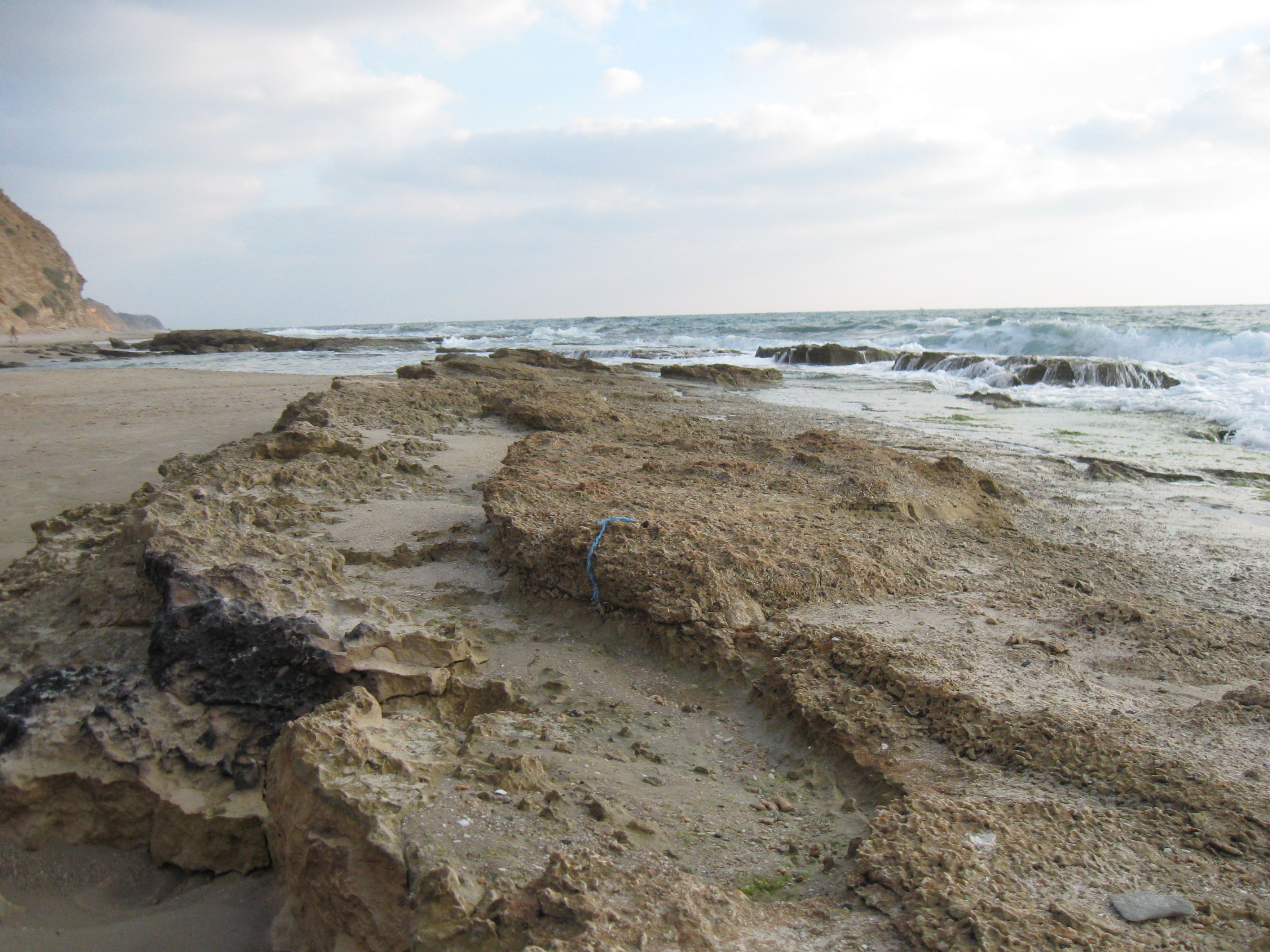
A coast near Arsuf

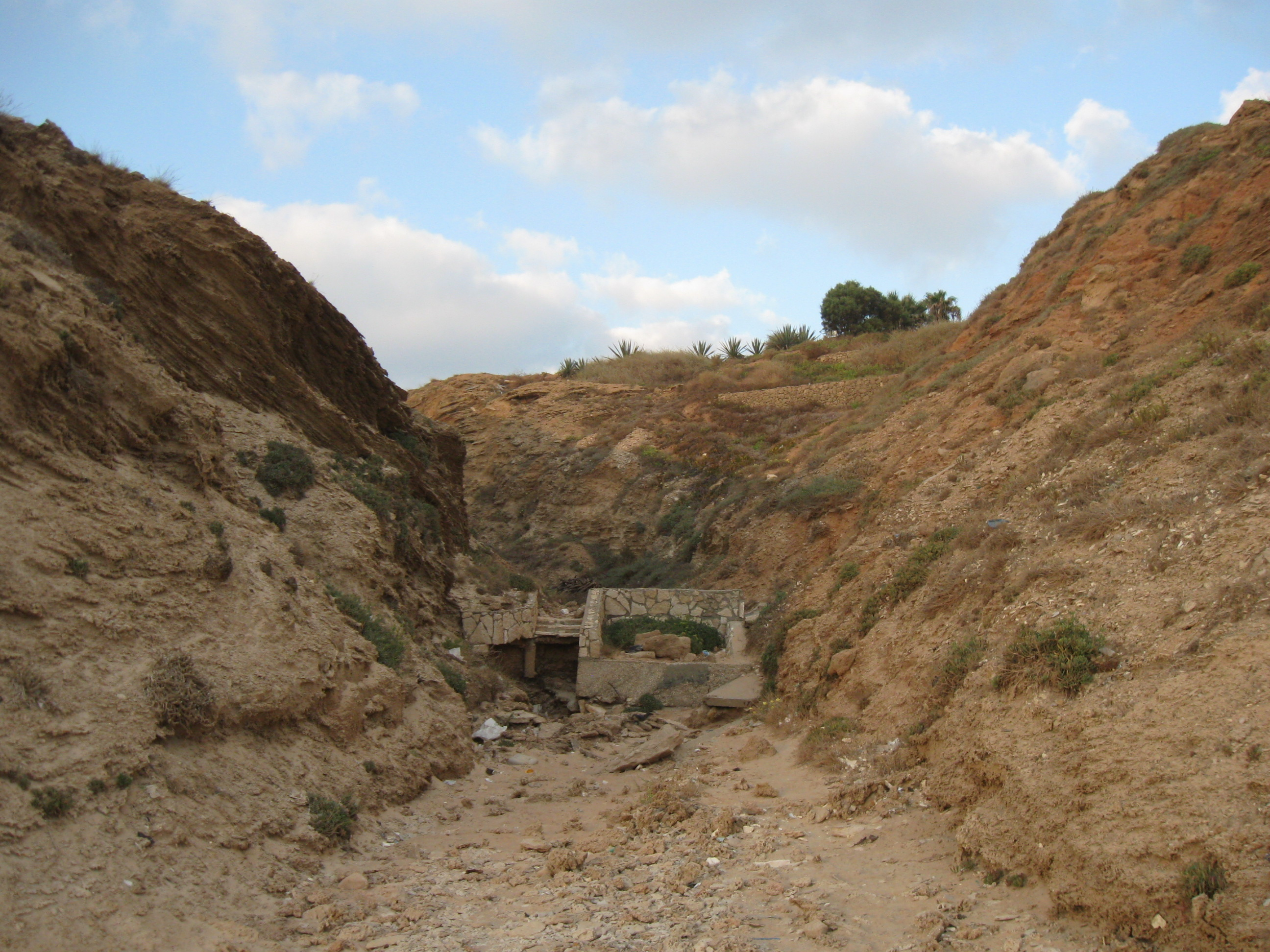
Cliffs near Arsuf

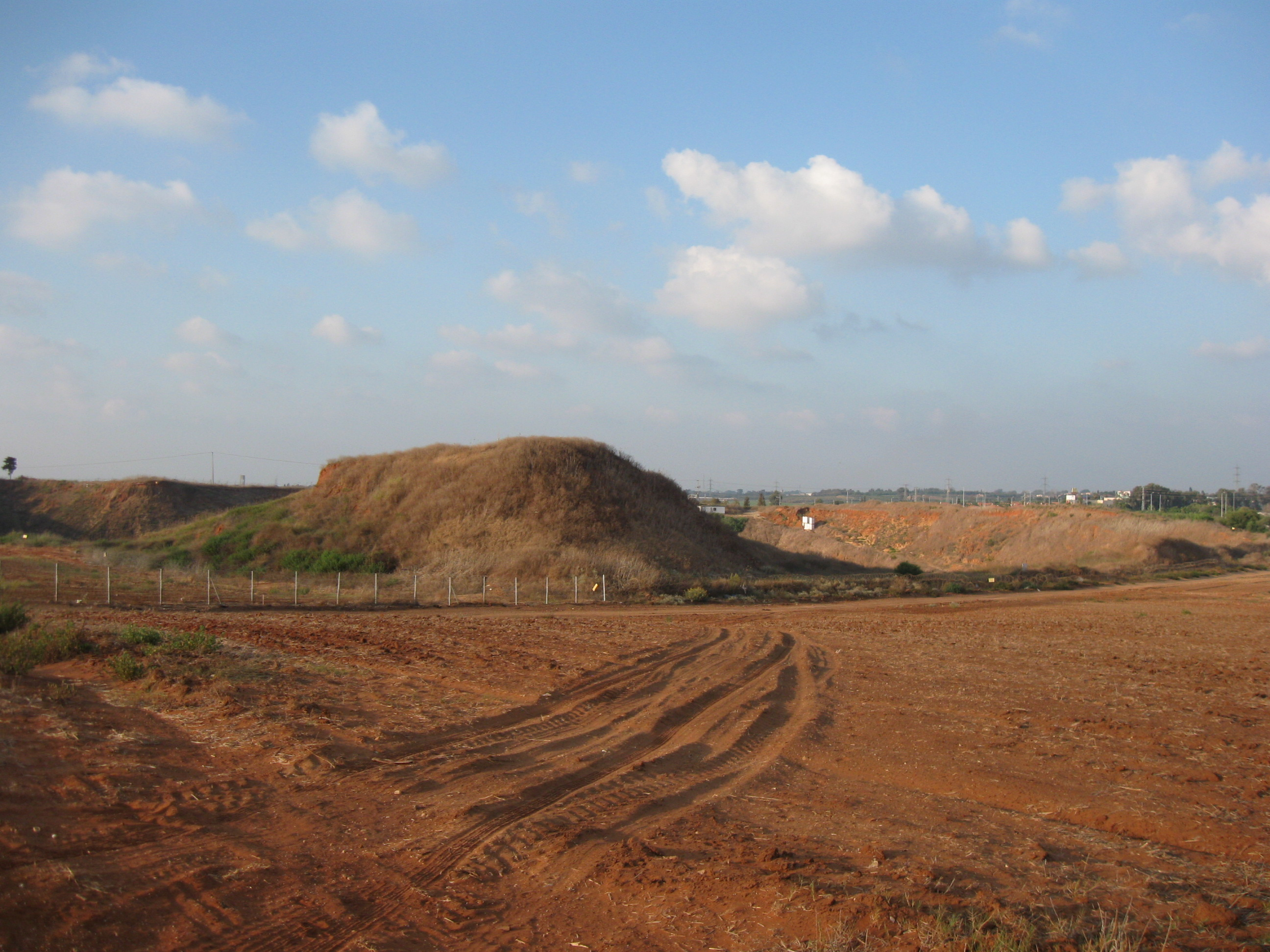
Old quarry at the edge of the Sharon plain

== See also ==
- List of escarpments
