= Technoda - Hadera =

Science museum in Hadera, Israel

- הטכנודע - מרכז לחינוך מדע וטכנולוגיה
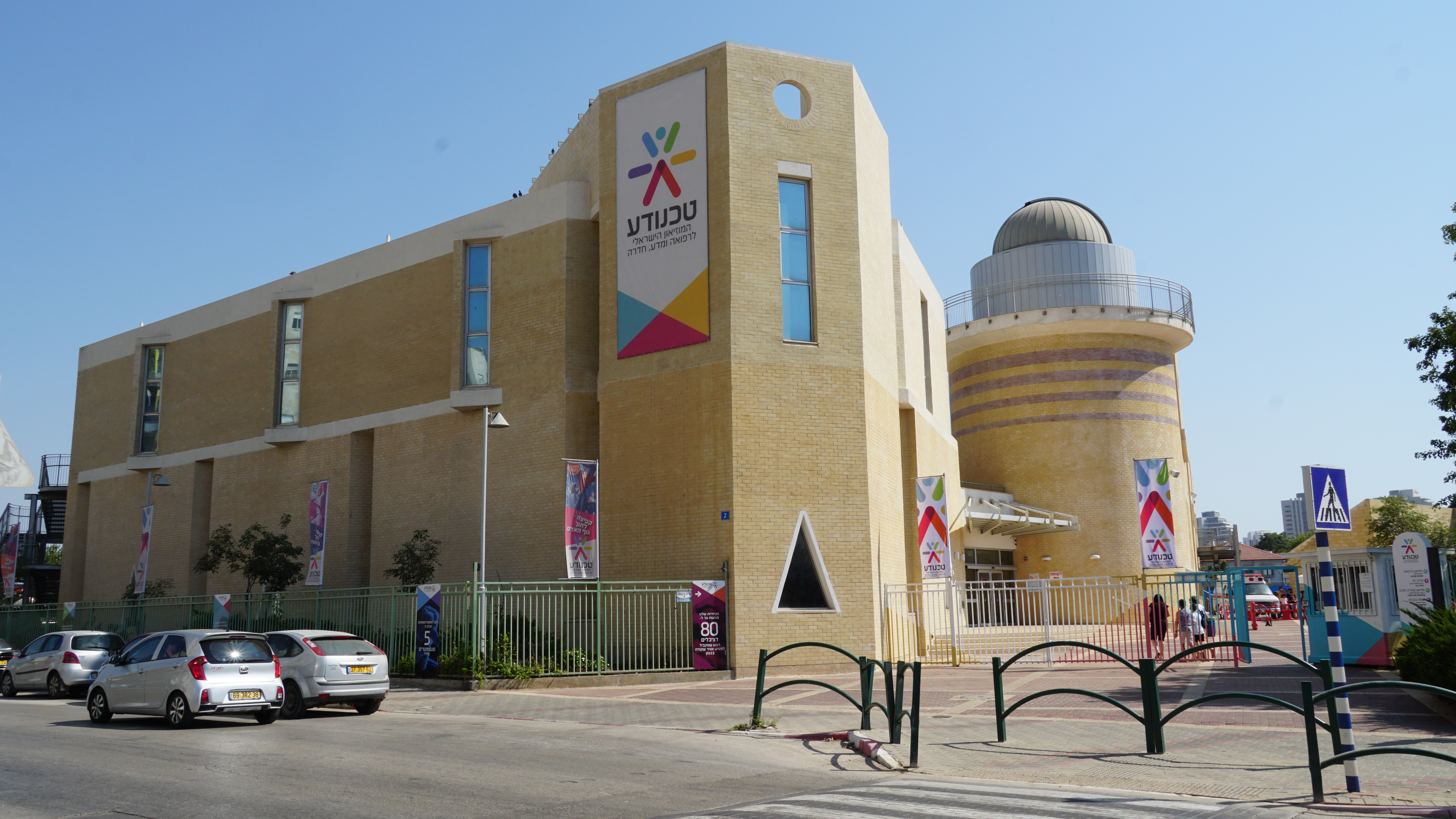

- Location within Haifa region of Israel

General information
- Location: Hadera, Israel
- Coordinates: 32°26′19″N 34°53′19″E

Website
- www.technoda.il

The Technoda (Hebrew: טכנודע) is an interactive science museum in Hadera, Israel.

== History ==
The Technoda was founded in 1986 as an extension of the Madatech Museum at the Technion, as part of the Jewish Agency's neighborhood rehabilitation project.

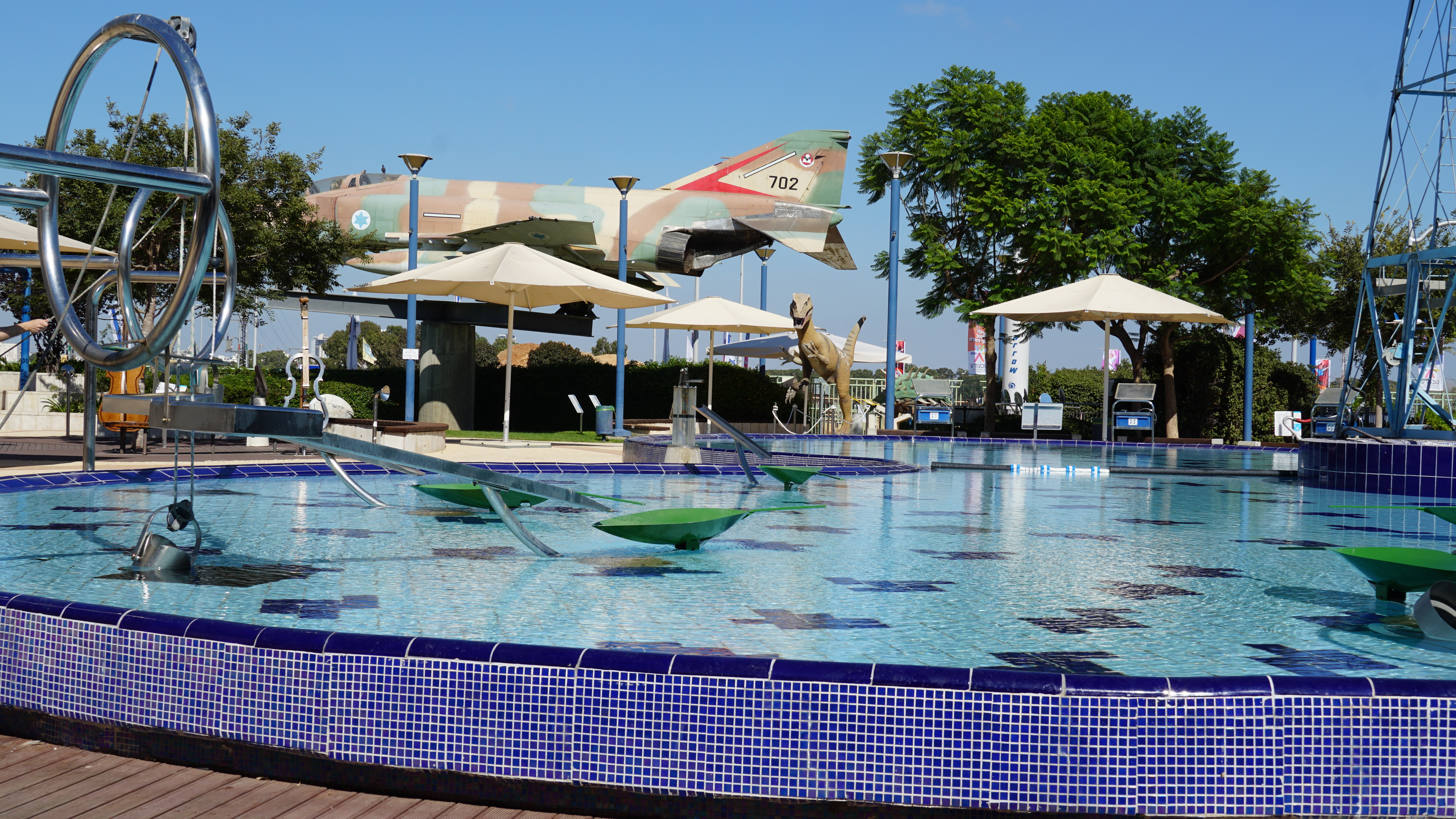
Science Park inside the Technoda-Hadera Museum

The center offers a variety of educational activities for about 20,000 children a year, from all sectors of society in Israel. The Technoda activities focus on research experience in science for kindergarten and school children as a complementary curriculum, and after-school enrichment classes in fields such as physics, biology, medicine, electronics, robotics, aeronautics, astronomy, optics, computers and mathematics. The Technoda also serves as a regional center for gifted students and as a teacher training center.

The new Technoda campus, inaugurated in September 2006, includes advanced science, technology and computer laboratories, an astronomy observatory and a planetarium. Most days of the year, there are educational and social programs such as: a special center for early childhood-technogan, early childhood science, a morning program for elementary schools, a morning program for high schools, a gifted-students' program, an excellence project, day boarding schools, a science program, astronomy lectures and more.

At the end of 2011, construction began on a large exhibition hall for an interactive scientific-technological center and Science Park.

In the Science Park, four acres of an outdoor science laboratory were built to demonstrate the answers through experience. The park has an energy complex, where one can experience exhibits powered by solar energy, heat energy, and wind energy. An audio area, where huge musical instruments are displayed, through which the visitors can learn about basic principles of acoustics and music. An aviation complex, where a Phantom aircraft, an Arrow missile, a Defender helicopter and an advanced UAV are stationed, demonstrating the progress and development in aviation.

In 2017, it was announced that a museum dedicated to medicine would also be built there. The area of the Museum of Medicine is about 1,000 square meters and the cost of its construction is about NIS 15 million. The museum was inaugurated in 2020. The Museum of Medicine has 6 exhibitions, including 120 interactive exhibits dealing with the human body and medicine. The museum also includes operations' rooms with human simulators, through which medical procedures are demonstrated.

The Technoda's telescope, about 40 cm in diameter, is based on mirror and lens optics and gives the viewer up to 800 times magnification.

== See also ==
- List of museums in Israel
