= Andrea M. Bronfman Prize for the Arts =

- Native name: The Andy
- Description: Award for Israeli decorative arts (ceramics, glass, textiles, jewelry)
- Country: Israel
- Presented by: The Andrea and Charles Bronfman Philanthropies

The Andrea M. Bronfman Prize for the Arts (the Andy,) is an annual design award given to an Israeli decorative artist working in ceramics, glass, textiles or jewellery.

== Awards ==
The prize includes a cash award of NIS 50,000, in addition to a solo exhibit at the Tel Aviv Museum of Art and a published catalogue of the exhibit. Also, two of the artist's works are purchased, one to be added to the permanent collection of the Israel Museum, and one to be added to the collection of the Tel Aviv Museum of Art.

In 2017 the prize was relaunched by Bronfman's children as The Andy, $5,000 prize awarded annually to each of three students at the Bezalel Academy of Arts and Design.

== History ==
The prize was created by Charles Bronfman in 2006 to mark Andrea Bronfman's 60th birthday; she was hit by a car and died before the first award was made.

== Winners ==
- 2006: Hadas Rosenberg-Nir.
- 2007: Itay Noy.
- 2008: Esther Knobel.
- 2010: Tzuri Gueta.
- 2012:Shirly Bar-Amotz.
- 2013:Maya Muchawsky Parnas (ceramics) and Gali Cnaani (textile design) who also won the Edmond de Rothschild Foundation Prize for Design in 2022
- 2014: Attai Chen
- 2015: Vered Kaminski (Jewelry).
