= Isaac Bachman =

Israeli diplomat

Isaac Bahman
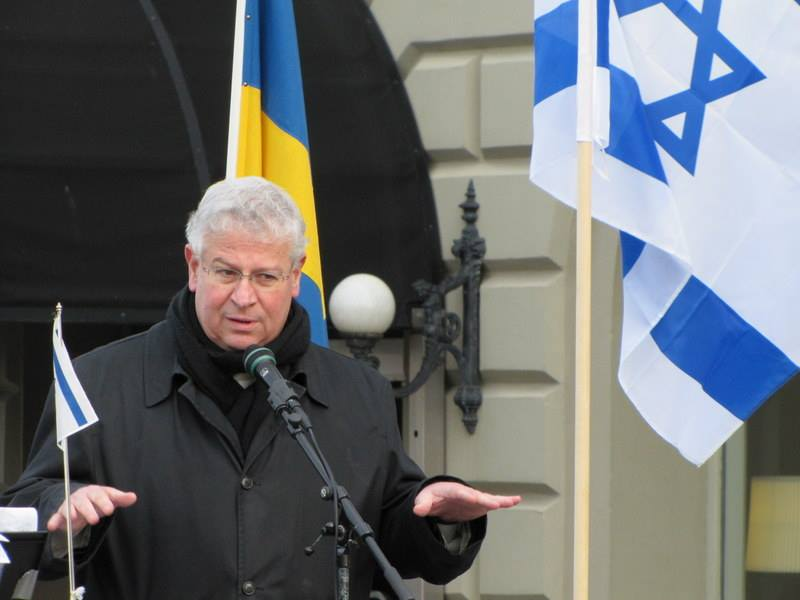
- Isaac Bachman, 2016
- Born: 1957 (age 68–69); Givat Olga, Israel
- Occupation: Diplomat

Isaac Bahman (Hebrew: יצחק בחמן; born 1957) is an Israeli diplomat who serves as ambassador, senior diplomatic advisor for the Knesset. Bachman Served as a special envoy for digital diplomacy at the Foreign Ministry of Israel, as the Chief Political advisor of the Foreign Minister, as Israel's ambassador to Sweden, to Bolivia, to Guatemala and as a non-resident ambassador to Honduras.

== Biography ==
Bachman was born in Givat Olga, Israel. He is a graduate of the Amal-Holtz vocational High School in Tel Aviv, where he studied electronics and aeronautics. After High school Bachman graduated from the Technology Reserve Studies, and enlisted in the Air Force. Bachman served throughout his regular compulsory 3 years of army service, and then for a year and a half of subsequent professional army service, as head of a Phantom Aircraft Radar Technician team. Bahman graduated law studies from Tel Aviv University in 1985, and worked as a lawyer, specializing in commercial and real estate law.

== Career ==
In 1987 Bachman joined the Foreign Ministry of The State of Israel and worked in the Foreign Minister's Bureau, as part of Minister Shimon Peres' team. In 1989 he was appointed Deputy Ambassador to Burma (Myanmar today) and in 1992 Deputy Ambassador to Uruguay.

On his return from these two back-to-back missions, he worked in the Human Rights Department of the Ministry and from 1995 to 1998 he served as Deputy Ambassador to Brazil. In 1998, he was appointed Israeli Ambassador to Bolivia and served in that position until 2001. Upon his return, he served as Head of the Department of Official Guests Visits at the Ministry of Foreign Affairs, and managed and organized in this context, and from all aspects, the official visits of presidents, foreign ministers and other guests and delegations, who came to Israel as the official guests of the State of Israel.

In 2004 Bachman was appointed Director of the South American department. In July 2006, Bachman was appointed Israeli Ambassador to Guatemala and a non-resident ambassador to Honduras, serving during the coup in Honduras in June 2009.

Immediately afterwards, he served as the head of Foreign Minister Avigdor Lieberman's political staff (2009-2012), organizing, accompanying, and participating in all the Minister's trips abroad and his various meetings on these visits, as well as the Foreign Minister's meetings in Israel, with his counterparts and other official guests from various countries.

In 2012, he was appointed Israeli Ambassador to Sweden. During his tenure, he dealt with the crisis in Israel-Sweden relations, against the background of the sanctions against Iran and the Swedish government's recognition of a Palestinian state, following which he was called back to Jerusalem for consultations. In August 2017 he ended his tenure in Sweden. During his five years as ambassador in Sweden, he was very active on social media and managed to spread responses to ongoing criticism of Israel in the context of the conflict and consequently to the willingness of the written media to publish his articles and make public the official Israeli positions on this criticism, before or after it was published.

In his next position he was appointed Ambassador, Special Envoy for digital diplomacy, in the Ministry of Foreign Affairs. Ambassador Bachman conducted the voting of all emissaries of the State of Israel abroad, from all government ministries and other eligible bodies, in the four election campaigns to the Israeli Parliament (The Knesset), from the 21st Knesset election, to the 24th Knesset.

In November he was appointed to senior diplomatic advisor for the Knesset.

== Personal life ==
Ambassador Bachman is married to Osnat, who accompanied him on all his missions abroad, and worked at the various embassies to which they have been posted, including as a cultural attaché, during his five years in Sweden. He is a father of three and a grandfather of grandchildren.
