= Tzuri Gueta =

Israeli jewelry and fabric designer

Tzuri Gueta (Hebrew: צורי גואטה; born 1968) is an Israeli jewelry and fabric designer based in Paris.

== Background and education ==
Gueta was born in Givat Olga, Israel, in 1968. His parents immigrated to Israel from Tripoli, Libya. He attended secondary school at Kibbutz Shomrat. He is the youngest of nine children. His first job was working on the production line in the kibbutz knitting factory. He studied at the Shenkar College of Engineering and Design, graduating with a degree in textile engineering. He moved to Paris in 1996.

== Career ==
The New York Times describes Gueta's jewelry as "blur(ring) the lines between craft, fashion and art."

Gueta is known for having developed a technique to infuse natural fibers with synthetic polymers, enabling him to create a lace-like, three-dimensional material that he describes as a “lace-fed silicone.” He patented the process in 2006 and founded Silka Design, producing handmade jewelry, textiles, lighting fixtures, and furniture.

In 2009, he won the Grand Prix de la Création by the City of Paris for his "cocoon" lamp.

In 2010, he won the Andrea M. Bronfman Prize for the Arts and was given a solo show at the Tel Aviv Museum of Art.

Gueta's work is in the collections of museums including the Museum of Arts and Design in New York City.
