= Dothan Valley =

Coordinates: 32°26′N 35°13′E

Dothan Valley or Sahl Arraba (Hebrew: עמק דותן Emek Dotan; Arabic: سهل عرّابة Sahl ʻArrābah, Arraba plain) is an alluvial plain in the northern West Bank. The region is about eleven kilometers long and four kilometers wide. There are several Palestinian towns located in and around the valley, including Arrabah, Bir al-Basha, Burqin, Yabad, Qabatiya and Kufeirit. There is also an Israeli settlement there - Mevo Dotan.

== In the Bible ==
Dothan Valley is mentioned in the Hebrew Bible as the site where Joseph was sold by his brothers.

== See also ==
- Dothan (ancient city)
