= Or Kahlon =

Israeli dancer and Pilates instructor (born 1988)

Or Kahlon אור כחלון
- Born: February 2, 1988 (age 38); Givat Olga, Israel
- Occupations: Dancer, Pilates instructor and entrepreneur
- Years active: 2005–present
- Dancing career
- Former groups: Spanish National Dance Company; Nederlands Dans Theater
- Dances: Contemporary dance

Or Kahlon (Hebrew: אור כחלון; born 2 February 1988) is an Israeli dancer, Pilates instructor and entrepreneur. He was a soloist with Spain's Spanish National Dance Company and Nederlands Dans Theater, and is the founder of Pilates & Or, an international ballet-inspired Pilates studio and education brand.

== Early life and education ==
Kahlon was born and raised in Givat Olga, Israel. He began dancing at the age of fourteen. He graduated from the Thelma Yellin High School of Arts in 2005 and later attended summer training programmes at the Juilliard School in New York City.

In 2006, Kahlon won the first season of the Israeli dance competition Born to Dance.

== Dance career ==
Kahlon danced with the Spanish National Dance Company from 2007 to 2009, performing as a soloist. From 2009 to 2011, he performed as a soloist with Nederlands Dans Theater.

== Pilates career ==
After his dance career, Kahlon developed a ballet-inspired, musically driven approach to reformer Pilates. His method combines ballet technique, Pilates, choreography, musicality and strength-based conditioning in flow-based classes.

Kahlon founded Pilates & Or, which operates studios in Santa Barbara, California; Boca Raton, Florida; and Polanco, Mexico City, Mexico. The company also provides online instruction and international teacher-training programs, through which Kahlon trains instructors in his movement method.

In 2025, Vogue Hong Kong featured Pilates & Or in its guide to Pilates studios around the world. The article described Kahlon's ballet-inspired reformer instruction and flow-based Pilates method.

In 2026, Kahlon was profiled by Bold Journey for his transition from professional dance to Pilates and the development of Pilates & Or as an international movement brand. He shares choreography, Pilates instruction and educational content through social media; the Pilates & Or Instagram account had more than 800,000 followers as of July 2026.
