= Mevo Dotan =

Israeli settlement in the West Bank

Mevo Dotan: מְבוֹא דּוֹתָן (Hebrew)
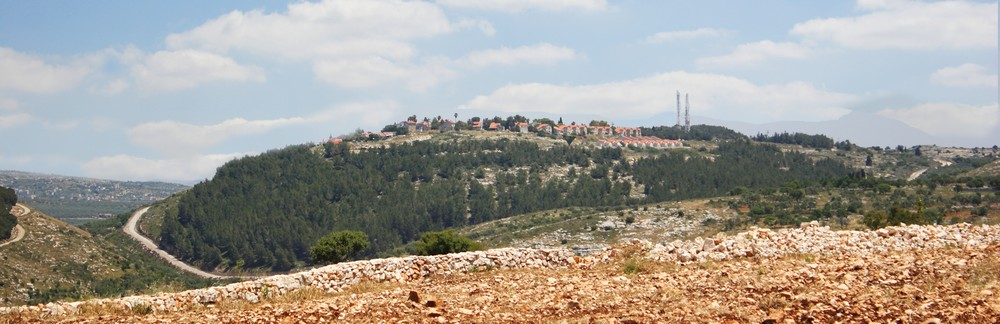

- Location within the Northern West Bank
- Coordinates: 32°25′13″N 35°10′31″E
- Country: Palestine
- District: Judea and Samaria Area
- Council: Shomron
- Region: West Bank
- Affiliation: Amana
- Founded: 1977
- Founder: Amana
- Population (2024): 776

Mevo Dotan (Hebrew: מְבוֹא דּוֹתָן, lit. 'Dothan's approach') is an Israeli settlement in the West Bank. Located in the south of the Dothan Valley east of Baqa al-Gharbiyye and adjacent to the Palestinian town of Ya'bad, it is organised as a community settlement and falls under the jurisdiction of Shomron Regional Council. In 2024 it had a population of 776.

The international community considers Israeli settlements in the West Bank illegal under international law, but the Israeli government disputes this.

== History ==
According to Wafa, Mevo Dotan is built on land belonging to the Palestinian village of Ya'bad.

In 2001, following the outbreak of the Second Intifada, and the degradation of the security level in the area, almost half the residents left the village. The heads of the village committee called for public assistance in repopulating the empty homes and in 2003, the 'Golan Yeshiva' decided to accept the challenge. Several families moved to the village, founded a kollel and rejuvenated the religious life in the village.

== Alonei Arava Nature Reserve ==
Two kilometers south of Mevo Dotan is the Alonei Arava Nature Reserve, named after the oak trees (alonim) that grow in the area and the nearby Palestinian village of Arrabeh. East of the nature reserve is Jabal al-Aqra' (326 m), and the nature reserve overlaps the hill's northwest range.
