= HaSharon Park =

Nature reserve in Israel

Coordinates: 32°25′52.3″N 34°53′44.1″E

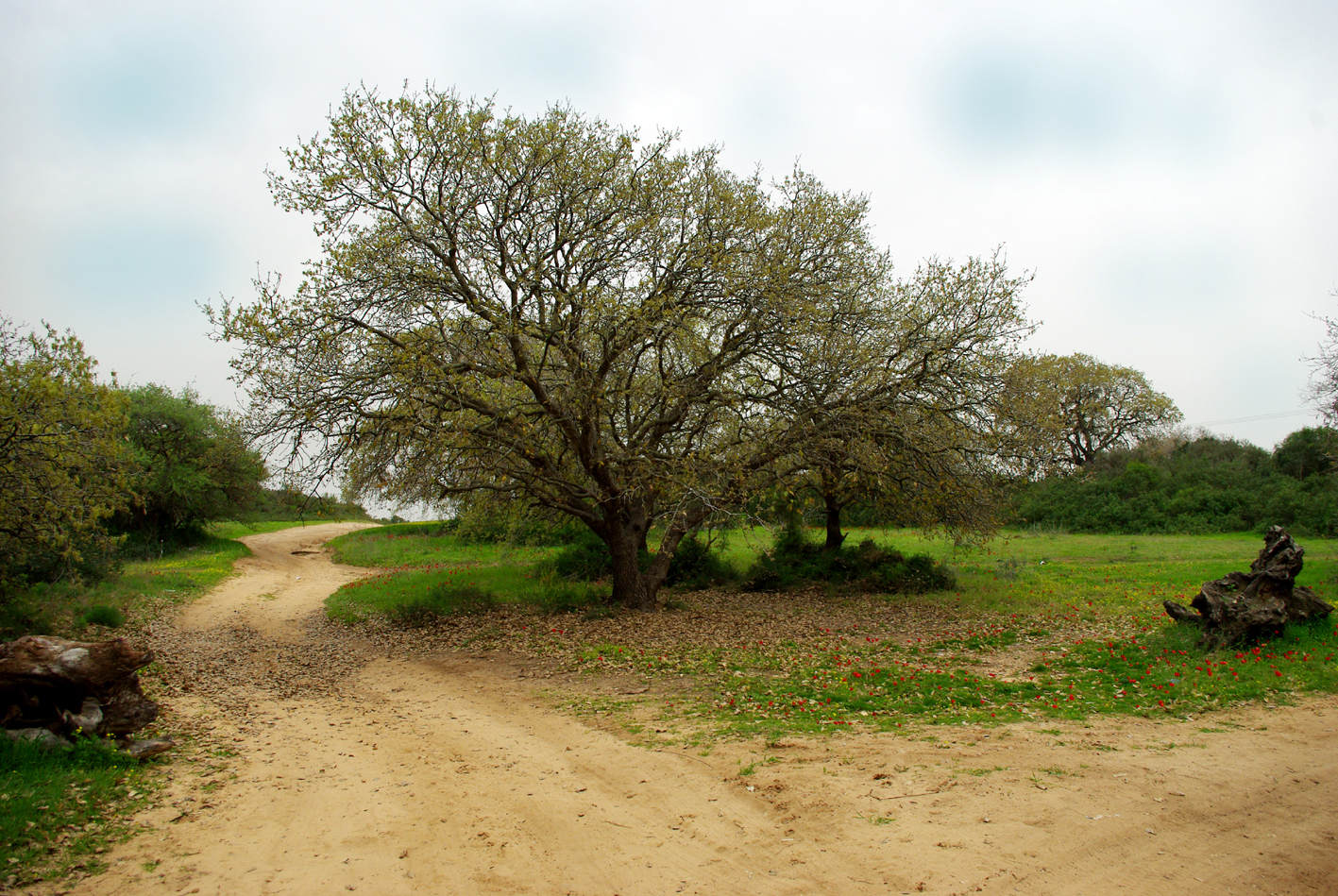
HaSharon Park

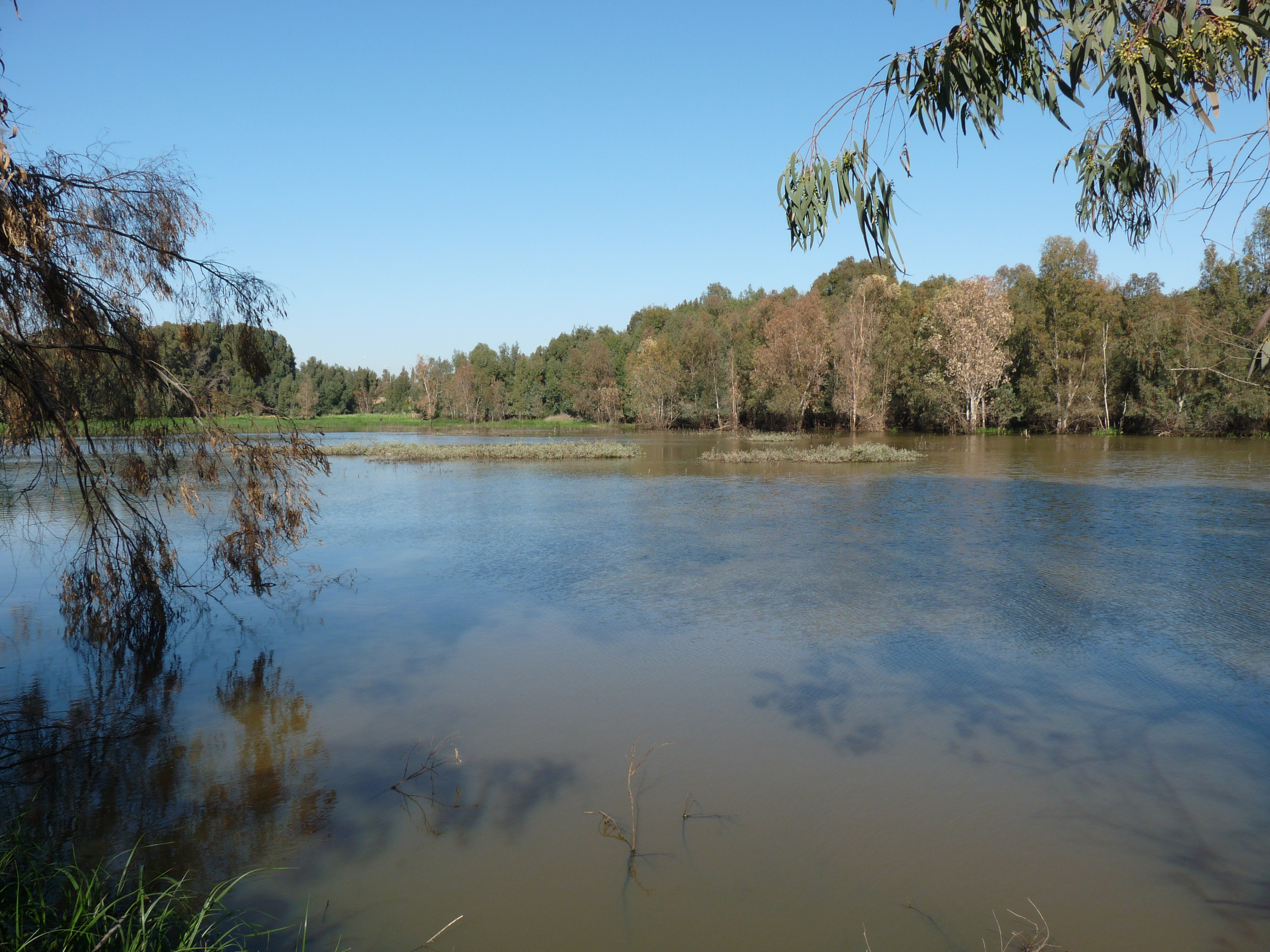
Lake in HaSharon Park

HaSharon Park (פארק השרון) is an Israeli national park located alongside Highway 4 with the entrance to it going through the Hadera West Railway Station.

== History ==
The park consists of a large forest full of carob and Mount Tabor oak trees. It is bordered by the Alexander Stream National Park.

The park also consists of a remnant of the swamps which used to cover the whole region, prevented the cultivation of the land, and caused malaria disease. These swamps were dried out. The park contains many eucalyptus trees which were planted there in the early twentieth century in order to dry out the swamps.

== See also ==
- Wildlife of Israel
