= Ma'ale Iron =

Ma'ale Iron: מעלה עירון; معاليه عيرون
- Local council (from 1996)

Hebrew transcription(s)
  - ISO 259: Maˁle ʕiron
  - Also spelled: Jabal 'Ara (official)
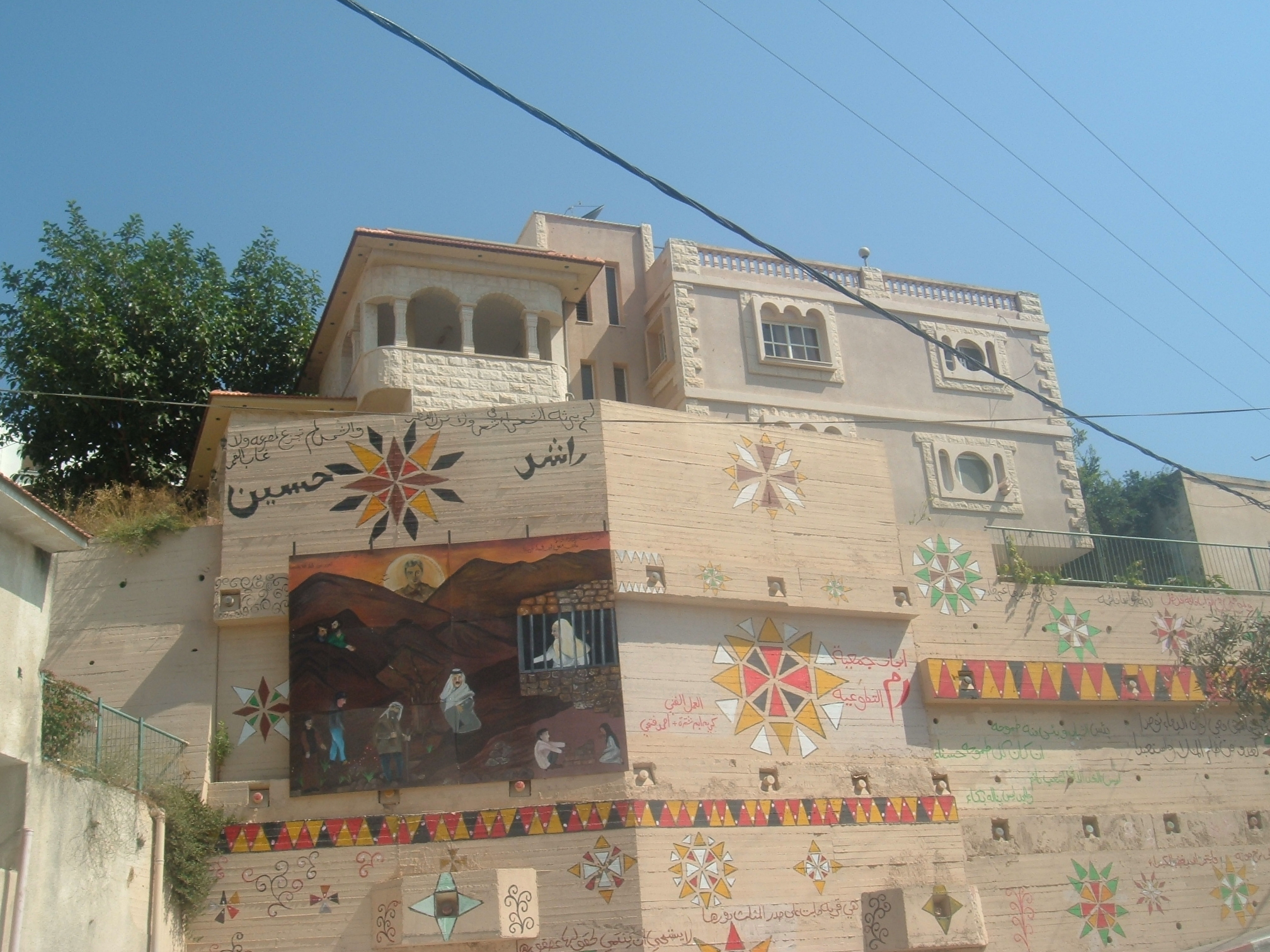

- Location within Haifa region of Israel Location within Israel
- Coordinates: 32°32′54″N 35°11′51″E
- Country: Israel
- District: Haifa
- Subdistrict: Hadera
- Natural Region: Alexander Mountain
- Founded: 1996

Government
  - Head of Municipality: Mustafa Ighbarieh

Area
  - Total: 6,300 dunams (6.3 km^{2}; 2.4 sq mi)

Population (2024)
  - Total: 15,486
  - Density: 2,500/km^{2} (6,400/sq mi)

Ma'ale Iron (Hebrew: מעלה עירון, lit. Iron Heights; Arabic: معاليه عيرون) is an Arab local council in Israel's Haifa District and is a part of the Wadi Ara region in the Triangle. The town consists of the five villages of Bayada, Musheirifa, Musmus, Salem and Zalafa. The villages were joined together in 1996 by the Interior Ministry of Israel to form the local council. In 2024 its population was 15,486, predominantly Muslims. It has an area of 6.3 km^{2}. Ma'ale Iron has four elected members and since 2013 the head of the council has been Mustafa Ighbarieh.

== History ==
=== 20th century ===
The five villages of Ma'ale Iron did not have municipal status and instead were under the administration of mukhtars (village headmen) appointed by the Interior Ministry until 1992 when the Interior Ministry established the Nahal Iron regional council. The council also included Barta'a, Ein as-Sahala and Mu'awiya in addition to the five current villages of Ma'ale Iron. Initially the council operated mainly in Bayada and Salem but in the rest of the villages the locals objected to the administrative arrangement and sought independent municipal status. To allay local concerns, the Interior Ministry established an investigative committee to examine other options, and in 1996, decided to split the regional council into two local councils: Ma'ale Iron and Basma.

Between 1996 and 2003, council meetings were held in Afula.

=== 21st century ===
In 2004 the council's headquarters moved to Zalafa. Until 2003 the council was appointed by the interior minister until elections were held in 2001 and Muhammad Fauzi Jabbarin was elected as the council head. In 2006 the Interior Ministry suspended Ma'ale Iron's budget for not reporting the wages of council workers. Because of the dispute, the Interior Ministry dissolved the council and appointed a new one, headed by Michael Iluz from the Shas party. In 2009 a plea was sent to the High Court of Justice against the current council and to hold local elections. The court instructed the interior minister to arrange elections but he decided to extend the council's term for another year. In 2010 the council's members asked to move Ma'ale Iron's headquarters back to Afula due to alleged threats made against them, but the Interior Ministry refused. In 2013 local elections were held in Ma'ale Iron and Mustafa Ighbarieh was elected as the council head.

In 2006 there were floods in the Wadi Ara region. The estimated damage in Ma'ale Iron, Umm al-Fahm and Basma was 44 million NIS. The floods damaged the sewage system of Bayada, Musmus and Musheirifa and caused the pollution of the Ba'ana River that passes through Musheirifa. The budget given by the government was insufficient and bureaucratic problems delayed the restoration. Eventually the river was cleaned in 2013.

In November 2014, Ma'ale Iron and Megiddo Regional Council started a project for cooperation between the five villages of Ma'ale Iron and the thirteen communities of Megiddo. Two teams from each council participate in sports, community and environmental work. Art galleries displaying the works of locals were opened in localities in both councils and annual activities such as planting trees in Tu BiShvat have been conducted.

== Villages ==
=== Bayada ===
Bayada lies on top of Musheirifa. It was a neighborhood of Musheirifa until it broke away. The vast majority of the residents are members of the Jabarin clan. In the 2008 census Bayada's population was counted with Musheirifa and together their population was 3,100.

=== Musmus ===
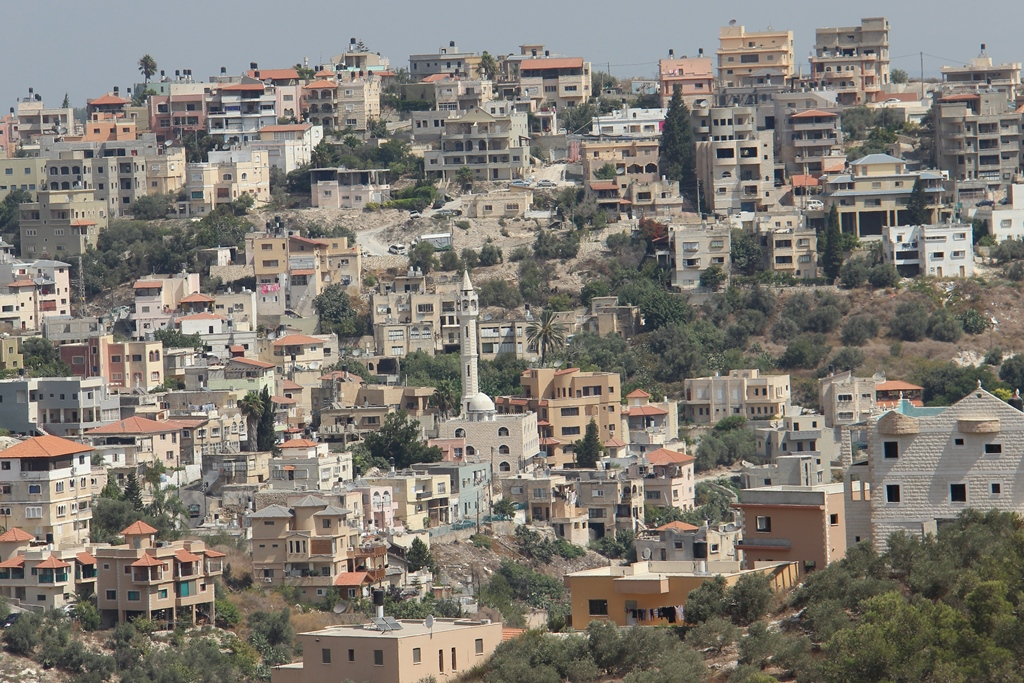
Musmus, Ma'ale Iron

Musmus lies below Musheirifa. Most of the residents belong to the Ighbarieh and Mahagna clans. The village is the birthplace of the Palestinian poet Rashid Hussein. Highway 65 passes through the village and splits it into two parts. In the 2008 census, Musmus's population was 3,900.

=== Musheirifa ===
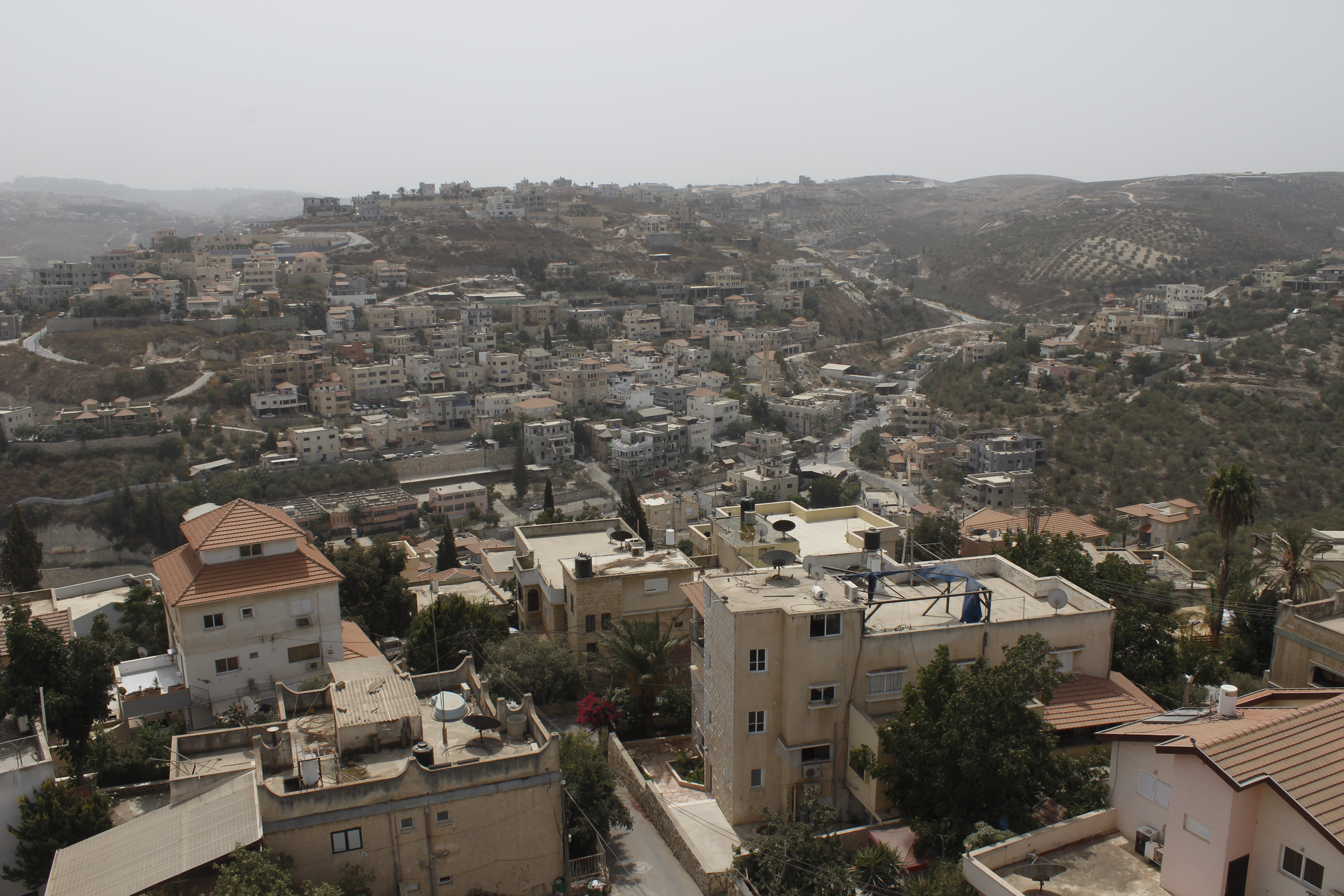
Musheirifa, Ma'ale Iron

Musheirifa lies between Musmus and Bayada. The inhabitants are largely members of the Ighbarieh clan, which inhabits the upper parts of the village, and the Jabbarin clan, which inhabit the lower parts. In the 2008 census Musheirifa's population was counted with Bayada and together their population was 3,100.

=== Salem ===
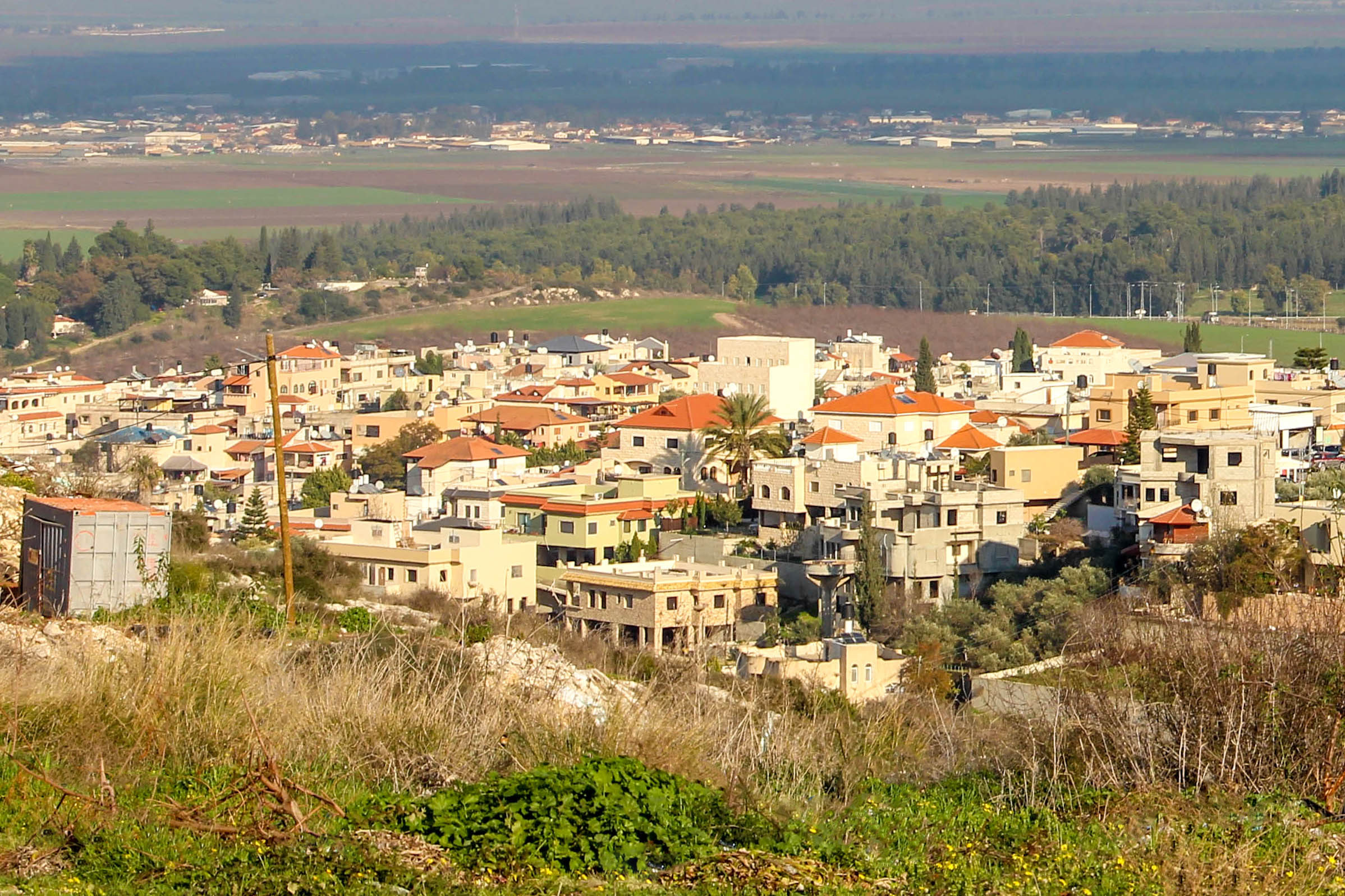
Salim, Ma'ale Iron

Salem lies near the Green Line and the separation barrier. Salem is divided into two parts. The western part is inhabited by members of the Abu Bakr clan and the Eastern part is inhabited by members of the Araf'aiya and Subaihat clans as well as some other clans. According to the 2008 census there were 1,600 residents in the village.

=== Zalafa ===
Zalafa lies between Musmus and Salem. In the 2008 census, Zalafa's population was 4,000.

== Demographics ==
In 2014 Ma'ale Iron had 15,486 residents, all of whom are Arabs and 99.9% are Muslims. In 2013, 41.9% of the residents were 17 or under, 54.2% were 18–64 and 3.9% were aged 65+. There were 2,126 families living in 2,629 households. There were 3,491 students in 7 schools: 4 elementary schools and 3 high schools. 50.8% were entitled to a Bagrut.

== Sports ==
There are three soccer groups in the villages:

- Hapoel Bnei Zalafa – plays in Liga Bet and hosts matches in a soccer field in Umm el-Fahm.
- Bnei Musheirifa Bayada – plays in Liga Gimel and hosts matches in a soccer field in Barkai.
- Hapoel Bnei Musmus – plays in Liga Gimel and hosts matches in a soccer field in Umm el-Fahm.

== Voting Patterns ==
In the 2022 election, 89 percent of voters in Ma'ale Iron voted for the Arab parties, while 6 percent voted for the parties of the right-wing coalition led by Benjamin Netanyahu and 4 percent voted for the parties of the center-left coalition led by Yair Lapid. Among the voters for the Arab parties, 49 percent voted for Balad, while 27 percent voted for the Hadash–Ta'al list and 25 percent voted for Ra'am.

In the 2026 election, 98 percent of voters in Ma'ale Iron voted for the Arab parties, while 1.3 percent voted for the parties of the center-left coalition led by Gadi Eisenkot and 0.2 percent voted for the parties of the right-wing coalition led by Benjamin Netanyahu. Among the voters for the Arab parties, 85 percent voted for the Joint List, while 15 percent voted for Ra'am. Voter turnout roughly doubled compared with the 2022 election.

== See also ==
- Arab localities in Israel
