= Salem, Ma'ale Iron =

Salem: סאלם; سالم
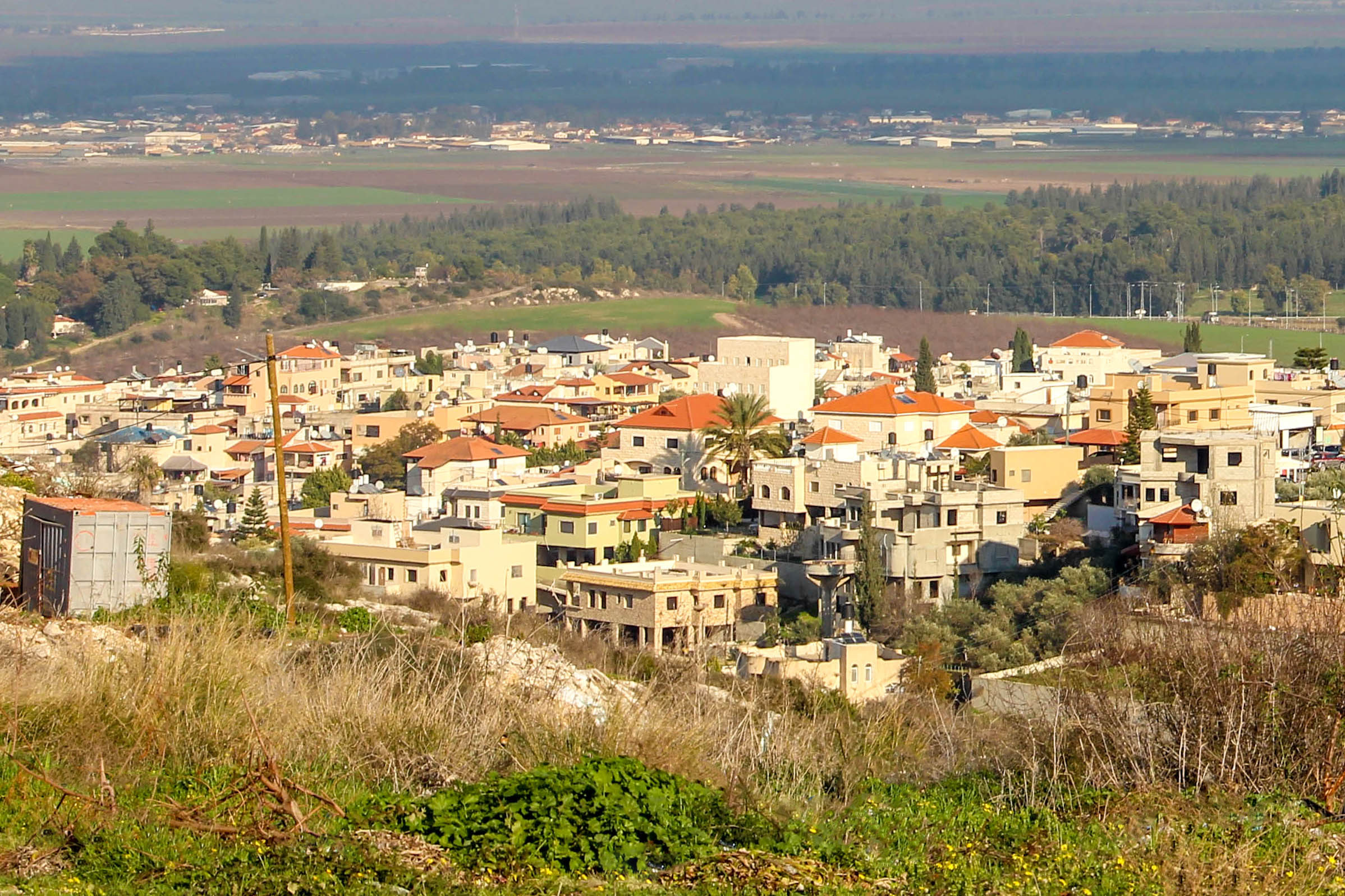
- Salem in 2016

- Location within Haifa region of Israel Location within Israel
- Coordinates: 32°32′26″N 35°12′5″E
- Grid position: 169/216 PAL
- Country: Israel
- District: Haifa
- Council: Ma'ale Iron

Population (mid-2016)
  - Total: 1,699
- Name meaning: from a personal name

Salem or Salim (Arabic: سالم, Hebrew: סאלם) is an Arab village in Israel's Haifa District. The village is in the Wadi Ara area of the northern Triangle, 4 kilometers northeast of Umm al-Fahm. Since 1996, it has been under the jurisdiction of the Ma'ale Iron local council. In mid-2016 Salem's population was 1,699, predominantly Muslims. The village is divided into five neighborhoods: Abu Bakr, Darwish, Subaihat, Ayyash and Rifa'i. Most of the adult males in the village work in manual labour.

== History ==
Pottery remains from the Iron Age I, IA II, Persian and the Hellenistic era have been found, and a rock-hewn installation has been excavated from the latter period.

Pottery and coins have been also been found from the Roman period, in addition to pottery from the Byzantine, early Islamic and Mamluk period.

=== Ottoman Empire ===
Salem, like the rest of the region of Palestine, was incorporated into the Ottoman Empire in 1517, and in the census of 1596, the village was located in the nahiya of Sha'ara in the liwa of Lajjun. It had a population of 9 households, all Muslim. It paid a fixed tax of 25% on agricultural products, including wheat, barley, olive trees, goats and beehives, in addition to occasional revenues; the taxes totalled 4,300 akçe.

French traveler Victor Guérin visited in 1870 and noted that "There are now not more than 150 residents, and it sits on a hill from which the view encompasses a considerable part of the Jezreel Valley." He further noted that there were "distinct traces" of ancient buildings.

In 1870/1871 (1288 AH), an Ottoman census listed the village in the nahiya of Shafa al-Gharby.

In 1882, the Palestine Exploration Fund's Survey of Western Palestine described Salem as a "small village standing above the road, with a well on the north".

=== British Mandate ===
In the 1922 census the population of the village was 44, all Muslim. Both in the 1931 census and in the 1945 statistics the population was counted with that of Rummanah.

=== Iraq and Jordan ===
During the 1948 Arab-Israeli War the village and the surrounding area came under Iraqi control. In March 1949 Jordanian forces replaced the Iraqi forces in Wadi Ara. On 3 April 1949 Israel and Jordan signed an armistice agreement in which Israel would receive the Wadi Ara area. During the war, 15 refugee families settled in the village.

=== Israel ===
In November 1954, a Jordanian force entered the village and attacked a squad of Magav policemen, wounding one. The incident caused outrage because the villagers did not report that the village was captured and did not oppose the force, allowing it to attack Israeli security personal. The villagers said they were in their homes and didn't see anything. The villagers had strong relations with the nearby Palestinian village of Rummanah, as two of Salem's clans originated in Rummanah. In the 1950s there was constant smuggling between the two villages. In the late 1950s, the Jewish kibbutz of Giv'at Oz established good relations with Salem as well as nearby Zalafa when a Kupat Holim clinic was built in the kibbutz which served the residents of Salem. Later the kibbutz provided water and transportation services to Salem and social contact was built up between both communities as the residents started learning Hebrew. The villagers started reporting the Israeli authorities about attacks coming from Jordan.

Salem is one of the villages of Wadi Ara that lacked municipal status after the establishment of Israel. and was under the administration of mukhtars (village headmen) who were appointed by the Interior Ministry. and salem's muckhtar was named Taleb Abu Bakr These mukhtars administrated the village until 1992, when the Interior Ministry established the Nahal Iron regional council, uniting it with seven other Arab villages. Salem was one of the two villages that cooperated with the council, while the other villages objected to the administrative arrangement and sought independent municipal status for each village. During this period most of the existing roads in Salem were paved. To allay local concerns in other villages, the Interior Ministry established an investigative committee to examine other options, and in 1996, decided to split the regional council into two local councils, one of them is Ma'ale Iron, which includes Salem and the other one is Basma.

Since 2010 the Ma'ale Iron municipality building is located in the village. In 2024, weapons were found in the village suspected for ordinary criminal activity.

== Population ==
According to the 2008 census of the Central Bureau of Statistics (CBS), Salem had 1,600 residents, 99.9% of them Muslim.
49.8% were under age 17, 48.1% were aged 18–64, and 2.1% were over 65. The median age was 18.

Development of the population
Year	1922	1961	1972	1983	1995	2008	2016
Population	44	168	248	482	675	1,600	1,699

Salem is divided into two parts. The western part is inhabited by members of the Abu Bakr clan which originated in Ya'bad; in 2001 this clan numbered 3,500, of which 3,000 lived in the West Bank and 500 lived in Israel–300 in Salem and 200 in nearby Zalafa. The eastern part is inhabited by members of the Araf'aiya and Subaihat clans, as well as some other clans.

== Economy ==
According to the 2008 CBS census, 32.5% of residents were in the annual civilian labour force; 60.4% of the men; 0.9% of the women. 49.3% of the male workforce worked in construction; 9.8% in wholesale, retail trade, and Auto Mechanism; 8.8% in manufacturing; and the rest in other sectors. 100% of the female workforce worked in education.

== See also ==
- Arab localities in Israel

== Bibliography ==
- Barron, J.B., ed. (1923). Palestine: Report and General Abstracts of the Census of 1922. Government of Palestine.
- Bernet, Michael (August 2004). The Time of the Burning Sun: Six Days of War, Twelve Weeks of Hope. Chester and West. p. 44. ISBN 0975582518.
- Cohen, Michael; Haiman, Mordechai (2008-05-29). "Salim Final Report". Hadashot Arkheologiyot – Excavations and Surveys in Israel (120).
- Conder, C.R.; Kitchener, H.H. (1882). The Survey of Western Palestine: Memoirs of the Topography, Orography, Hydrography, and Archaeology. Vol. 2. London: Committee of the Palestine Exploration Fund.
- Dauphin, C. (1998). La Palestine byzantine, Peuplement et Populations. BAR International Series 726 (in French). Vol. III : Catalogue. Oxford: Archeopress. ISBN 0-860549-05-4.
- Government of Palestine, Department of Statistics (1945). Village Statistics, April, 1945.
- Guérin, V. (1875). Description Géographique Historique et Archéologique de la Palestine (in French). Vol. 2: Samarie, pt. 2. Paris: L'Imprimerie Nationale.
- Hadawi, S. (1970). Village Statistics of 1945: A Classification of Land and Area ownership in Palestine. Palestine Liberation Organization Research Centre.
- Hütteroth, W.-D.; Abdulfattah, K. (1977). Historical Geography of Palestine, Transjordan and Southern Syria in the Late 16th Century. Erlanger Geographische Arbeiten, Sonderband 5. Erlangen, Germany: Vorstand der Fränkischen Geographischen Gesellschaft. ISBN 3-920405-41-2.
- Mahamid, Khaled; Haiman, Mordechai (2006-12-11). "Salim (East)". Hadashot Arkheologiyot – Excavations and Surveys in Israel (118).
- Mills, E., ed. (1932). Census of Palestine 1931. Population of Villages, Towns and Administrative Areas. Jerusalem: Government of Palestine.
- Morris, B. (2004). The Birth of the Palestinian Refugee Problem Revisited. Cambridge University Press. ISBN 0-521-00967-7.
- Palmer, E.H. (1881). The Survey of Western Palestine: Arabic and English Name Lists Collected During the Survey by Lieutenants Conder and Kitchener, R. E. Transliterated and Explained by E.H. Palmer. Committee of the Palestine Exploration Fund.
- Zertal, A. (2016). The Manasseh Hill Country Survey: From Nahal 'Iron to Nahal Shechem. Vol. 3. Brill. ISBN 978-9004312302.
