= Bayada, Ma'ale Iron =

Bayada: בַּיָאדָה; البياضة

Hebrew transcription(s)
  - Also spelled: בַּיָדָה (unofficial)
- Location within Haifa region of Israel Location within Israel
- Coordinates: 32°33′23″N 35°9′56″E
- Grid position: 166/217 PAL
- Country: Israel
- District: Haifa
- Council: Ma'ale Iron

Population (mid-2016)
  - Total: 486

Bayada (Arabic: البياضة, Hebrew: בַּיָאדָה) or Khirbet al-Baiyada (Arabic: خربة البياضه, Hebrew: ח'רבת אל-ביאדה) is an Arab village in Israel's Haifa District. The village is in the Wadi Ara area of the northern Triangle, 4 kilometers northeast of Umm al-Fahm. Since 1996, it has been under the jurisdiction of the Ma'ale Iron local council. In mid-2016 the population of Bayada was 486, all of whom are Muslims.

Bayada is the feminine form of the word white in Arabic. The village was so named because of the bright soil found in the area.

== Geography ==
Bayada is one of the smallest villages in the region and is located on a hill overlooking Wadi Ara. The village is located between the Umm al-Fahm mountain ridge and the Menashe Heights.

== History ==
=== Ottoman Empire and British Mandate ===
The village was originally a neighborhood of Musheirifa. The vast majority of the residents are members of the Jabbarin clan (Who also live in nearby Salim and Musheirifa). During the 19th and first half of the 20th century, Bayada was a small dependency of the Fahmawi Commonwealth established by Hebronite clans belonging to Umm al-Fahm. The Commonwealth consisted of a network of interspersed communities connected by ties of kinship, and socially, economically and politically affiliated with Umm al Fahm. The Commonwealth dominated vast sections of Bilad al-Ruha/Ramot Menashe, Wadi 'Ara and Marj Ibn 'Amir/Jezreel Valley during that time.

=== Israel ===
During the 1948 Arab–Israeli War the village and the surrounding area came under Iraqi control. In March 1949 Jordanian forces replaced the Iraqi forces in Wadi Ara. On 3 April 1949 Israel and Jordan signed an armistice agreement, in which Israel would receive the Wadi Ara area and on 20 May Israeli forces took control of the village.

Bayada is one of the villages of Wadi Ara that lacked municipal status after the establishment of Israel, under the administration of mukhtars (village headmen) who were appointed by the Interior Ministry until 1992 when the Interior Ministry established the Nahal Iron (i.e. Wadi Ara) Regional council .

The locals' objected to the administrative arrangement, and sought independent municipal status for each village. To allay local concerns, the Interior Ministry established an investigative committee to examine other options, and in 1996, decided to split the regional council into two local councils: Ma'ale Iron, which includes Bayada, and Basma. Most of the residents work in construction and other related jobs.

== Demographics ==
Development of the population
Year	1972	1983	1995	2008	2016
Population	127	185	276	N/A*	486

*In the 2008 census Bayada and Musheirifa were counted together and their population was 3,100

== Sports ==
Bayada and nearby Musheirifa have a joint football team named "Bnei Musheirifa Bayada" (Hebrew: בני מושריפה ביאדה) which participates in Liga Gimel Jezreel. The team hosts games in a football field located in Barkai.

== See also ==
- Arab localities in Israel
