= Mu'awiya (disambiguation) =

Mu'awiya I (died 680) was the founder and first caliph of the Umayyad Caliphate from 661 to 680.

== People ==
Mu'awiya (Arabic: مُعَاوِيَة, romanized: Muʿāwiya) is a male Arabic given name with a disputed meaning. Other notable bearers of this name include:

- Mu'awiya II (661–684), third Umayyad caliph from 683 to 684
- Mu'awiya ibn Hudayj, Umayyad commander and governor
- Mu'awiya ibn Hisham (died 737), Umayyad prince and commander
- Maaouya Ould Sid'Ahmed Taya (born in 1941), president of Mauritania from 1984 to 2005

== Places ==
- Mu'awiya, Basma, an Arab village in Israel
