= Musmus =

Musmus: מוסמוס; مُصمُص
- Village
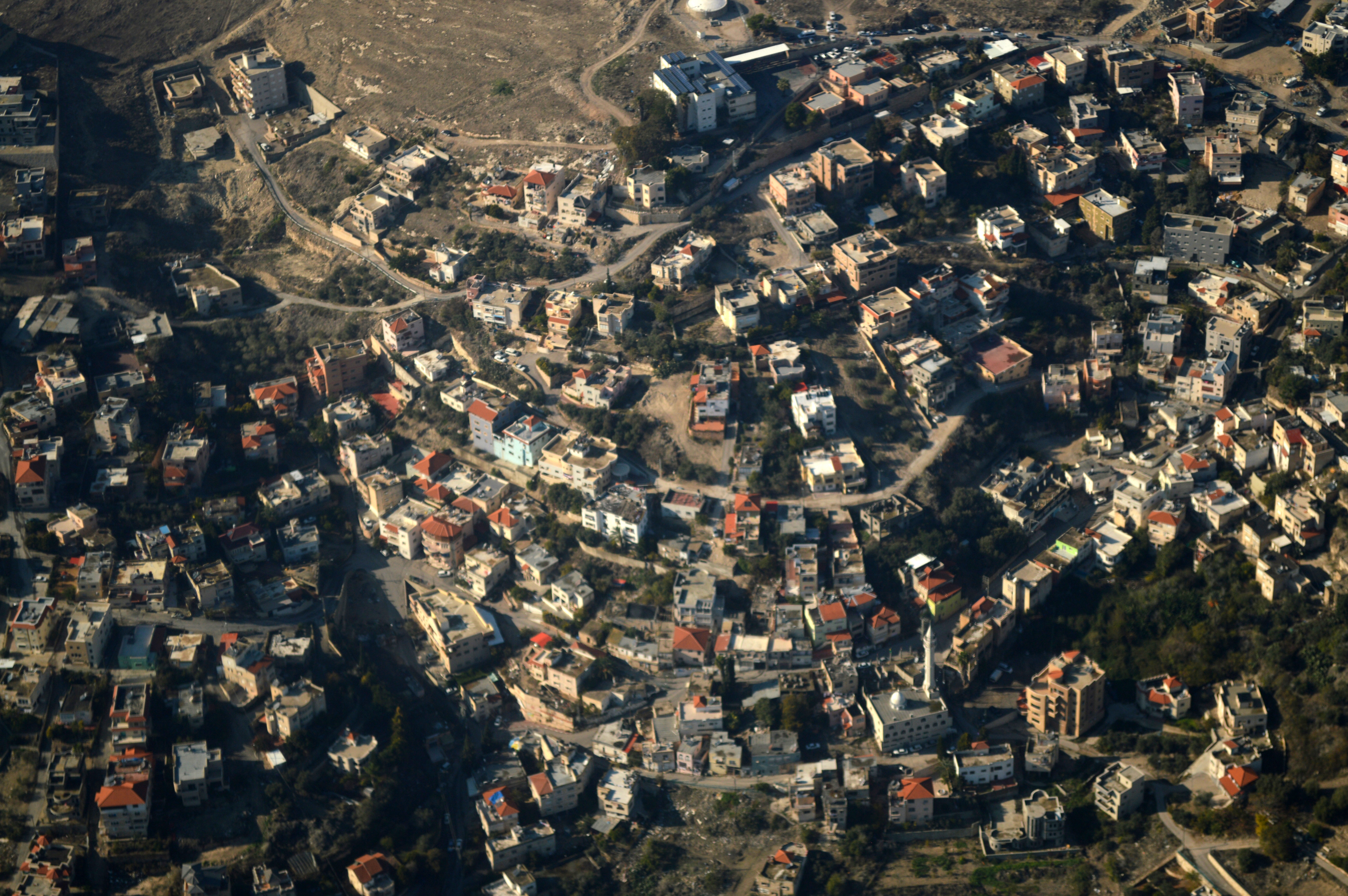
- Aerial photo of Musmus

- Location within Haifa region of Israel Location within Israel
- Coordinates: 32°32′35″N 35°09′23″E
- Grid position: 164/216 PAL
- Country: Israel
- District: Haifa
- Council: Ma'ale Iron
- Named for: Compactly built, or apricot

Population (mid-2016)
  - Total: 4,215

Musmus (Arabic: مُصمُص, Hebrew: מוצמוץ / מוסמוס) is an Arab village in Haifa District. The village is located in the Wadi Ara area of the northern Triangle, 4 kilometres (2.5 mi) northeast of Umm al-Fahm. Since 1996, it has been under the jurisdiction of the Ma'ale Iron local council. The village is divided into five neighborhoods: Abu Shehab, Ighbarieh, Southeast, Mahagna, and Sharqawi. In mid-2016, Musmus' population was 4,215, all of whom were Muslim.
Most of the villagers belong to the Ighbarieh and Mahagna clans. The village is the birthplace of the Palestinian poet Rashid Hussein. Highway 65 passes through the village and splits it into two parts.

== History ==
There are several theories for the origin of the village's name; some say it is a distortion of the name of the Pharaoh Thutmose II who conquered the land, others say that the name is that of an Egyptian village. According to a local Arab tradition, a trade caravan passed in the area and saw a man dying of thirst. They handed him a bottle of water and told him "mus, mus" ("suck" in Arabic) and saved his life. The man decided to remain in the place and build his home there and call it Musmus, and around his home the village developed. E. H. Palmer thought Musmus came from a personal name, meaning "compactly built", while Edward Robinson gave the name as Mushmush, meaning apricot.

The village was built on an ancient site from the Roman-Byzantine and early Muslim periods.

=== Ottoman Empire ===
In 1517 the village was incorporated into the Ottoman Empire with the rest of Palestine. During the 16th and 17th centuries, Musmus belonged to the Turabay Emirate (1517-1683), which encompassed also the Jezreel Valley, Haifa, Jenin, Beit She'an Valley, northern Jabal Nablus, Bilad al-Ruha/Ramot Menashe, and the northern part of the Sharon plain.

The modern village was established during the 1830s by members of the al-Bashir clan from nearby Umm al-Fahm. It was one of the oldest settlements of the so-called "Fahmawi Commonwealth" established by Hebronite clans belonging to Umm al-Fahm. The Commonwealth consisted of a network of interspersed communities connected by ties of kinship, and socially, economically and politically affiliated with Umm al Fahm. The Commonwealth dominated vast sections of Bilad al-Ruha/Ramot Menashe, Wadi 'Ara and Marj Ibn 'Amir/Jezreel Valley during that time.

The village was noted as a small hamlet by French explorer Victor Guérin in 1875. In the Palestine Exploration Fund's 1882 Survey of Western Palestine, Musmus was described as "a little village on a hillside, with springs to the south-west; the houses of stone and mud".

=== British Mandate ===
In the 1922 census the population of the village was 222, all Muslim, increasing in 1931 census to 256 residing in 50 houses.

During the British Mandate, the total land area of Musmus was around 6,000 dunams and its boundaries reached the Jezreel Valley. The village did not have a school, and the children received basic education from Sheikh Abu Farid of Umm al-Fahm, and later by Sheikh Omar Balawi, a literacy teacher from al-Butaymat who moved to Musmus in the 1930s. Toward the end of the British Mandate, the residents began building the village's first mosque, but construction was not completed.

In the 1945 statistics, the Musmus population was counted (together with other villages) under Umm al-Fahm.

In addition to agriculture, residents practiced animal husbandry which formed was an important source of income for the town. In 1943, they owned 136 heads of cattle, 50 sheep over a year old, 249 goats over a year old, 17 horses, 35 donkeys, 950 fowls, and 340 pigeons.

=== Israel ===
During the 1948 Arab-Israeli War the village and the surrounding area came under Iraqi control. In March 1949 Jordanian forces replaced the Iraqi forces in Wadi Ara. On 3 April 1949 Israel and Jordan signed the 1949 Armistice Agreements, in which Israel would receive the Wadi Ara area. On 20 April 1949, Musmus was taken by Israeli forces and was later annexed to Israel along with the rest of the Wadi Ara villages.

In 1954 the first mosque was built in the village. Musmus is one of the villages of Wadi Ara that lacked municipal status. In 1973, the Interior Ministry wanted to declare the village as a local council, but the residents rejected the proposal. Musmus remained without municipal status and was under the administration of mukhtars (village headmen) who were appointed by the Interior Ministry until 1992, when the Interior Ministry established the Nahal Iron regional council. The locals objected to the administrative arrangement and sought independent municipal status for each village. To allay local concerns, the Interior Ministry established an investigative committee to examine other options, and in 1996, decided to split the regional council into two local councils: Ma'ale Iron, which includes Musmus, and Basma.

In 2002, a suicide bombing attack on an Egged bus at the Musmus junction on Highway 65 killed seven people and wounded thirty. The Palestinian Islamic Jihad organization claimed responsibility. In 2009, an Israeli court ordered the demolition of a house that was built illegally in the village. When Interior Ministry workers arrived at Musmus with police reinforcements to carry out the demolition order, they were met with resistance from the inhabitants. The police used crowd control weapons to disperse the riot, lightly wounding five women. In 2013 the far-right wing party Otzma Yehudit held a march in the village in protest against unauthorized construction in Arab communities in Israel. No major incident was reported, but there was a large police presence at the protests. The villagers held a counter protest and called for the Jewish protesters to leave.

== Population ==
According to the 2008 census of the Central Bureau of Statistics (CBS), Musmus had 3,900 residents, 99.7% of them Muslim.
42.5% were under age 17, 54.4% were aged 18–64, and 3.2% were over 65. The median age was 22.

Development of the population
Year	1922	1931	1961	1972	1983	1995	2008	2016
Population	222	256	738	1,248	1,838	2,461	3,900	4,215

== Economy ==
According to the 2008 CBS census, 40.5% of residents were in the annual civilian labour force; 66.3% of the men and 16.1% of the women. 32.6% of the male workforce were employed in construction; 20.7% in wholesale, retail trade, and Auto Mechanism; 15.1% in education; and the rest in other sectors. 54.5% of the female workforce worked in education and 17.9% in health services, social service, and welfare service, and the rest in various other sectors.

== See also ==
- Arab localities in Israel

== Bibliography ==
- Barron, J.B., ed. (1923). Palestine: Report and General Abstracts of the Census of 1922. Government of Palestine.
- Conder, C.R.; Kitchener, H.H. (1882). The Survey of Western Palestine: Memoirs of the Topography, Orography, Hydrography, and Archaeology. Vol. 2. London: Committee of the Palestine Exploration Fund.
- Government of Palestine, Department of Statistics (1945). Village Statistics, April, 1945.
- Guérin, V. (1875). Description Géographique Historique et Archéologique de la Palestine (in French). Vol. 2: Samarie, pt. 2. Paris: L'Imprimerie Nationale.
- Hadawi, S. (1970). Village Statistics of 1945: A Classification of Land and Area ownership in Palestine. Palestine Liberation Organization Research Centre.
- Mills, E., ed. (1932). Census of Palestine 1931. Population of Villages, Towns and Administrative Areas. Jerusalem: Government of Palestine.
- Palmer, E.H. (1881). The Survey of Western Palestine: Arabic and English Name Lists Collected During the Survey by Lieutenants Conder and Kitchener, R. E. Transliterated and Explained by E.H. Palmer. Committee of the Palestine Exploration Fund.
