= Umm ar-Rihan =

Palestinian village in West Bank

Umm ar-Rehan
- Municipality type D (Village council)

Arabic transcription(s)
  - Arabic: أم الريحان
  - Latin: Khirbet Umm ar-Rehan (official)
- Location of Umm ar-Rehan within Palestine
- Coordinates: 32°29′01″N 35°08′31″E
- Palestine grid: 163/210
- State: Palestine
- Governorate: Jenin

Government
  - Type: Village council

Population (2017)
  - Total: 447
- Name meaning: "Mother of Basil"

Umm ar-Rehan (Arabic: أم الريحان, lit. 'Mother of Basil'; also transliterated Umm Rihan or Um al-Rehan) is a Palestinian village of 447 inhabitants located high on the northwestern hills of the Jenin Governorate of the State of Palestine, 14 kilometers (8.7 mi) from Jenin. It is one of a number of Palestinian villages that are now located within enclaves in the Seam Zone

Umm al-Rehan is one of seven villages that form part of the Barta'a enclave, which is named for the enclave's largest town: eastern Barta'a (pop. 3,500).

== History ==
=== British Mandate era ===
In the 1922 census of Palestine conducted by the British Mandate authorities, Kh. Umm Al-Rihan had a population of 26, all Muslims.

The wood near the village is the site of a memorial to early Palestinian militant leader Izz ad-Din al-Qassam of the Black Hand, killed in a gunfight with the British Palestine Police Force.

In the 1945 statistics, the population of Umm ar-Rihan was counted with that of Ya'bad, in an official land and population survey.

Under the 1947 United Nations partition plan for Palestine, Umm ar-Rehan was to form part of an Arab Palestinian state.

=== Post 1948 ===
After the 1948 Arab-Israeli war, Umm ar-Rehan fell under de facto Jordanian rule like other towns and villages in the West Bank, and since the 1967 Six-Day War, Umm ar-Rihan has been under Israeli occupation.

On August 27, 1998, the Israel Defense Forces (IDF) used bulldozers to uproot thousands of fruits trees on tens of dunums of land belonging to Umm ar-Rehan and az-Zawiya villages to prepare the ground for the construction of two new settlements. On October 10, 2000, more land belonging to Umm ar-Rehan was bulldozed to expand the Shaked and Hinnanit settlements.

In the months following the outbreak of the Second Intifada, Israeli checkpoints were erected on the eastern and southern roads to nearby Tura al-Gharbiya and Ya'bad, limiting access to the rest of the West Bank; the checkpoints were preserved as crossings in the Israeli West Bank barrier. Umm ar-Rehan's location in area east of the Green Line and west of the Israeli West Bank barrier is often referred to as the "Seam Zone".

== Present-day ==
Umm ar-Rehan is under the Palestinian National Authority's civil administration as per the Oslo Accords. There is one primary school run by the PNA, but no secondary school, clinic or other medical facilities. Um ar-Rehan residents can access the clinic in Barta'a Sharqiyya by way of an unpaved road. The 4,700 people who live in the Barta'a area enclave depend on this government clinic which has a pharmacy and also offers counseling on health awareness, but lacks medical specialists, laboratory testing and family planning services.

The main terminal to enter and exit the Barta'a Sharqiya-Um ar-Rehan enclave is Imreiha (Reikhan). In November 2004, it was open between 6am and 10am to Palestinians with green permits only. In August 2006, it was open between 7am and 9am between which times Israeli goods and produce enter the enclave area. Produce from the village for export to Israel is sent out only with prior coordination with the Israeli authorities.

On 30 April 2004, armed Israeli settlers entered the village and fired shots in the air before briefly taking over the primary school. They threatened to "expel" the Palestinians, urging them to go to nearby Ya'bad on the other side of the separation barrier. An official from the Education Ministry of the Palestinian National Authority and villager Faruat Zaid said they tried to contact the IDF about the raid, but there had been no response. Both the IDF and police said they had been unaware of the incident.

== Archaeology ==
Pottery remains from the Hellenistic and the Roman eras have been found here. In Roman times, the town of Umm ar-Rehan covered an area of 36-40 hectares, consisting of approximately a hundred houses, a road system, and a Roman bathhouse. Archaeological artifacts dating back to Byzantine times have also been uncovered here.

In 1882, the PEF's Survey of Western Palestine described the place as having "traces of ruins; drafted stones of good sized masonry [..] West of it in the valley is a ruined watchtower"; however, it is not clear that the PEF ever visited the site. The site was partially excavated by Zeev Yeivin in 1969, discovering a mausoleum with crypt graves, containing two decorated sarcophagi and 3rd-century pottery. A Bar-Ilan University team led by Shimon Dar performed a larger survey in 1986, mapping hundreds of roads, cisterns, silos, homes, defensive structures, towers, oil presses, and reservoirs. Dar et al. concluded that:

A. The beginning of the settlement in the area was in the 7th–6th centuries BCE. During this period two farms were built; the site itself was not yet settled, but the agricultural areas were exploited…

B. During the Persian Period the settlement itself was founded and cultivation of the surrounding lands commenced...

C. During the Hellenistic Period the settlement continued its development...and the agricultural roads were built.

D. ... During the Early Roman Period the peaceful growth of the site and building of the farms continued.

E. During the 3rd century CE the settlement was abandoned. We have no reasonable explanation for its abandonment...

Silos and/or homes for agricultural laborers were found nearby by Eyal Maharian in 1998.

In March 2024 the site was completely destroyed and overpaved by locals. The Israeli Civil Administration announced that it had arrested perpetrators and expected to charge them shortly.

== Environment ==
A 2,500 ha in the vicinity of the village, the Um Al-Reehan Nature Reserve, encompassing mainly remnant forested land, has been recognised as an Important Bird Area (IBA) by BirdLife International because it supports a resident population of Egyptian vultures.

== Bibliography ==
- Barron, J.B., ed. (1923). Palestine: Report and General Abstracts of the Census of 1922. Government of Palestine.
- Conder, C.R.; Kitchener, H.H. (1882). The Survey of Western Palestine: Memoirs of the Topography, Orography, Hydrography, and Archaeology. Vol. 2. London: Committee of the Palestine Exploration Fund.
- Dauphin, C. (1998). La Palestine byzantine, Peuplement et Populations. BAR International Series 726 (in French). Vol. III : Catalogue. Oxford: Archeopress. ISBN 0-860549-05-4.
- Department of Statistics (1945). Village Statistics, April, 1945. Government of Palestine.
- Hadawi, S. (1970). Village Statistics of 1945: A Classification of Land and Area ownership in Palestine. Palestine Liberation Organization Research Center.
- Palmer, E.H. (1881). The Survey of Western Palestine: Arabic and English Name Lists Collected During the Survey by Lieutenants Conder and Kitchener, R. E. Transliterated and Explained by E.H. Palmer. Committee of the Palestine Exploration Fund.
- Zertal, A. (2016). The Manasseh Hill Country Survey. Vol. 3. Boston: BRILL. ISBN 978-9004312302.
