= Zibda =

- Municipality type D (Village council)

Arabic transcription(s)
  - Arabic: زبده
- Location of Zibda within Palestine
- Coordinates: 32°27′00″N 35°07′45″E
- Palestine grid: 162/206
- State: State of Palestine
- Governorate: Jenin

Government
  - Type: Village council

Population (2017)
  - Total: 1,251
- Name meaning: Zebdah, Zebdah, personal name

Zibda (Arabic: زبده) is a Palestinian village in the Jenin Governorate.

== History ==
Pottery sherds from the early and late Roman eras (20% + 25%), Byzantine era (25%), and early Muslim (10%) and the Middle Ages (15%) have been found here.

Zibda is possibly the place called Zebedellum in Crusader sources in the year 1200.

=== Ottoman era ===
Zibda, like the rest of Palestine, was incorporated into the Ottoman Empire in 1517. During the 16th and 17th centuries, Zibda belonged to Turabay Emirate (1517-1683), which encompassed also the Jezreel Valley, Haifa, Jenin, Beit She'an Valley, northern Jabal Nablus, Bilad al-Ruha/Ramot Menashe, and the northern part of the Sharon plain.

In the census of 1596, the village appeared as Zabda, located in the nahiya of Sha'ara in the liwa of Lajjun. It had a population of 26 households, all Muslim. They paid a fixes tax rate of 25% on agricultural products, including wheat, barley, summer crops, goats and beehives, in addition to occasional revenues and a tax on a press for olive oil or grape syrup; a total of 6,500 akçe. Pottery remains from the early Ottoman era (5%) have also been found here.

Zibda was temporarily abandoned sometime after the 18th century due to war or blood feud between brothers, during the Qays–Yaman war of 1840–1860.

In 1838 Zebda was noted as a village in the Jenin province, also called the Haritheh esh-Shemaliyeh province.

In 1870/1871 (1288 AH), an Ottoman census listed the village in the nahiya of Shafa al-Gharby.

In 1882, the PEF's published its 1870s Survey of Western Palestine (SWP) described Zebdah as "a ruined village with a well."

=== British Mandate era ===
In the 1922 census of Palestine conducted by the British Mandate authorities, Zabdah had a population 150 Muslims, decreasing in the 1931 census to 132 Muslim, in a total of 22 houses.

In the 1945 statistics, the population of Zibda was 190 Muslims, with a total 11,924 dunams of land, according to an official land and population survey. Of this, 1,136 dunams were used for plantations and irrigable land, 1,022 dunams were for cereals, while a total of 6,591 dunams were classified as non-cultivable land.

=== Jordanian era ===
Following the 1948 Arab–Israeli War, and the subsequent 1949 Armistice Agreements, Zibda came under Jordanian rule.

The Jordanian census of 1961 found 225 inhabitants.

=== Israeli occupation ===
Since the 1967 Six-Day War, Zibda has been occupied by Israel.

The village has two tombs within it.

Zibda was temporarily abandoned sometime after the 18th century due to war or blood feud between brothers, possibly during the Qays–Yaman war of 1840–1860.

== Demography ==
The village is dominated by the Amarnah family from Ya'bad.

== Bibliography ==
- Barron, J.B., ed. (1923). Palestine: Report and General Abstracts of the Census of 1922. Government of Palestine.
- Conder, C.R.; Kitchener, H.H. (1882). The Survey of Western Palestine: Memoirs of the Topography, Orography, Hydrography, and Archaeology. Vol. 2. London: Committee of the Palestine Exploration Fund.
- Dauphin, C. (1998). La Palestine byzantine, Peuplement et Populations. BAR International Series 726 (in French). Vol. III : Catalogue. Oxford: Archeopress. ISBN 0-860549-05-4.
- Frantzman, Seth J. and Doron Bar (2013). "Mapping Muslim Sacred Tombs in Palestine During the Mandate Period". Levant. 45 (1): 96–111. doi:10.1179/0075891412Z.00000000011. S2CID 162185684. "Zibda, Umm Safa and Sinjil in the northern central highlands had two [tombs] each."
- Government of Jordan, Department of Statistics (1964). First Census of Population and Housing. Volume I: Final Tables; General Characteristics of the Population (PDF).
- Government of Palestine, Department of Statistics (1945). Village Statistics, April, 1945.
- Hadawi, S. (1970). Village Statistics of 1945: A Classification of Land and Area ownership in Palestine. Palestine Liberation Organization Research Center.
- Hütteroth, W.-D.; Abdulfattah, K. (1977). Historical Geography of Palestine, Transjordan and Southern Syria in the Late 16th Century. Erlanger Geographische Arbeiten, Sonderband 5. Erlangen, Germany: Vorstand der Fränkischen Geographischen Gesellschaft. ISBN 3-920405-41-2.
- Mills, E., ed. (1932). Census of Palestine 1931. Population of Villages, Towns and Administrative Areas. Jerusalem: Government of Palestine.
- Palmer, E.H. (1881). The Survey of Western Palestine: Arabic and English Name Lists Collected During the Survey by Lieutenants Conder and Kitchener, R. E. Transliterated and Explained by E.H. Palmer. Committee of the Palestine Exploration Fund.
- Robinson, E.; Smith, E. (1841). Biblical Researches in Palestine, Mount Sinai and Arabia Petraea: A Journal of Travels in the year 1838. Vol. 3. Boston: Crocker & Brewster.
- Zertal, A. (2016). The Manasseh Hill Country Survey. Vol. 3. Boston: BRILL. ISBN 978-9004312302. (see also Tell esh-Sheikh Ṣabar, p. 285 ff and p. 78)
