= Musheirifa =

Musheirifa: מושיירפה; المشيرفة
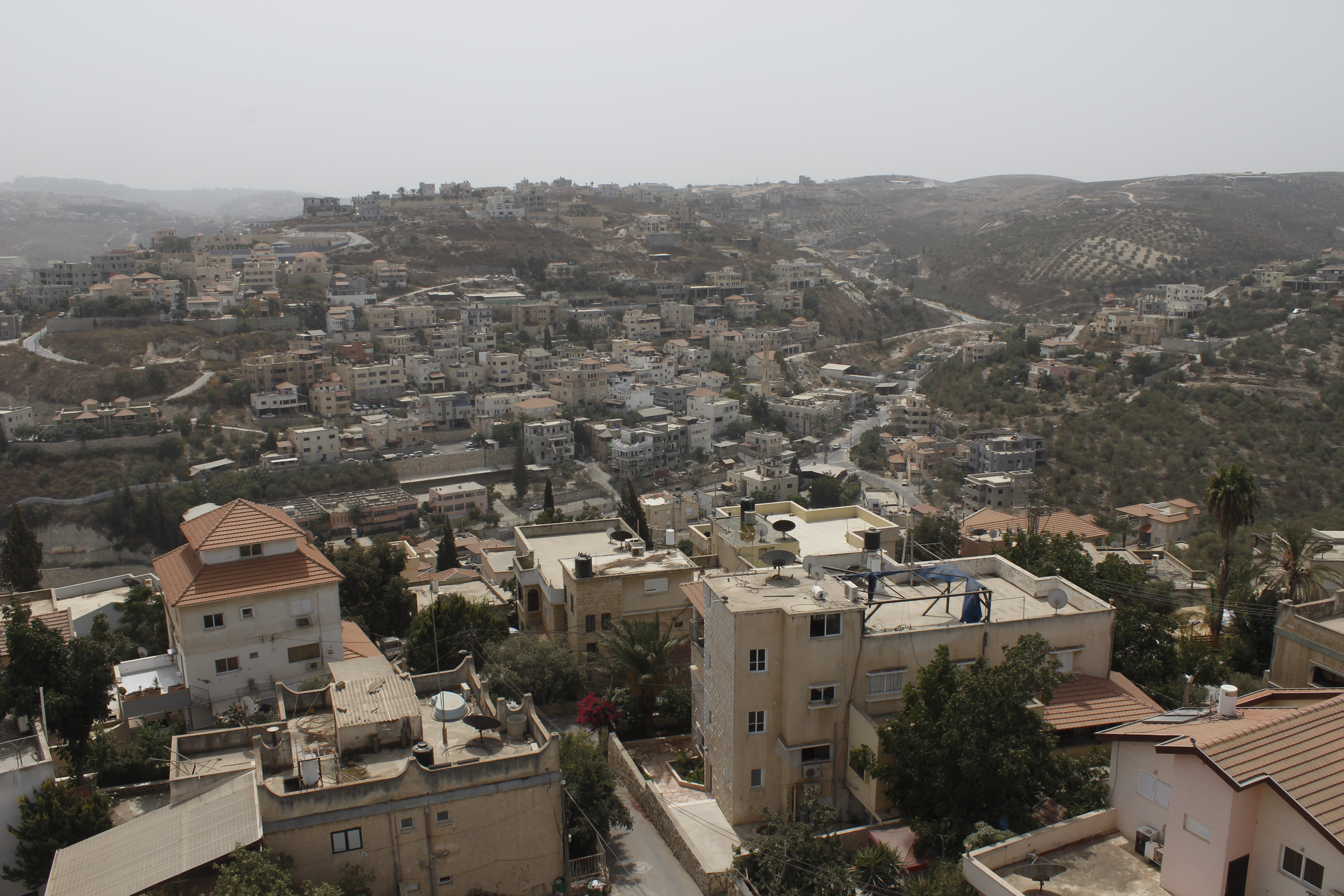
- Musheirifa in 2015

- Location within Haifa region of Israel Location within Israel
- Coordinates: 32°33′0″N 35°9′0″E
- Grid position: 164/217 PAL
- Country: Israel
- District: Haifa
- Council: Ma'ale Iron

Population (mid-2016)
  - Total: 3,472
- Name meaning: "The High Places"

Al-Musheirifa (Arabic: المشيرفة, Hebrew: מושיריפה or מושיירפה) is an Arab village in Israel's Haifa District. The village is located in the Wadi Ara area of the northern Triangle, 4 kilometres (2.5 mi) northeast of Umm al-Fahm. Since 1996, it has been under the jurisdiction of the Ma'ale Iron local council. In mid-2016 Musheirifa's population was 3472, all of whom are Muslim. The village is divided into four neighborhoods: Ighbarieh, El-Manshya, Jabbarin, and the Old Village. The inhabitants are largely members of the Ighbarieh clan, which inhabits the upper parts of the village, and the Jabbarin clan, which inhabit the lower parts. Bayada was a neighborhood of the village in the past but split from it and became a new village. The village has poor infrastructure and, like many other villages in the Wadi Ara region, lacks many social institutions and recreational areas.

== History ==
=== Ottoman Empire ===
In 1517 Musheirifa was incorporated into the Ottoman Empire with the rest of Palestine. During the 16th and 17th centuries, it belonged to the Turabay Emirate (1517-1683), which encompassed also the Jezreel Valley, Haifa, Jenin, Beit She'an Valley, northern Jabal Nablus, Bilad al-Ruha/Ramot Menashe, and the northern part of the Sharon plain.

Modern Musheirifa was established in the 1860s by people from nearby Umm al-Fahm. Partitioned into an Upper and Lower quarters, Musheirifa one of the settlements of the so-called "Fahmawi Commonwealth" established by Hebronite clans belonging to Umm al-Fahm. The Commonwealth consisted of a network of interspersed communities connected by ties of kinship, and socially, economically and politically affiliated with Umm al Fahm. The Commonwealth dominated vast sections of Bilad al-Ruha/Ramot Menashe, Wadi 'Ara and Marj Ibn 'Amir/Jezreel Valley during that time.

In the Palestine Exploration Fund's 1882 Survey of Western Palestine, Musheirifa was described as a "very small hamlet on high ground, with a well to the south".

=== British Mandate ===
In the 1922 census conducted by the British Mandate authorities, the population of the village was 203, all of whom were Muslim, increasing in the 1931 census to 233, still all Muslim, living in 45 houses.

In the 1945 statistics, Musheirifa's population was counted (together with other villages) under Umm al-Fahm.

In addition to agriculture, residents practiced animal husbandry which formed was an important source of income for the town. In 1943, they owned 166 heads of cattle, 335 goats over a year old, 4 camels, 26horses, a mule, 68 donkeys, 850 fowls, and 200 pigeons.

=== Iraq and Jordan ===
During the 1948 Arab-Israeli War the village and the surrounding area came under Iraqi control. On 15 April 1948, Jewish forces raided the village and did not capture it. In March 1949 Jordanian forces replaced the Iraqi forces in Wadi Ara. On 3 April 1949 Israel and Jordan signed an armistice agreement in which Israel would receive the Wadi Ara area.

=== Israel ===
Musheirifa is one of the villages of Wadi Ara that lacked municipal status after the establishment of Israel. It was under the administration of mukhtars (village headmen) who were appointed by the Interior Ministry until 1992, when the Interior Ministry established the Nahal Iron regional council. The locals objected to the administrative arrangement, and sought independent municipal status for each village. To allay local concerns, the Interior Ministry established an investigative committee to examine other options, and in 1996, decided to split the regional council into two local councils: Ma'ale Iron, which includes Musheirifa, and Basma.

== Demographics ==
Development of the population
Year	1922	1931	1961	1972	1983	1995	2008	2016
Population	203	233	578	982	1,523	2,049	N/A*	3,472

*In the 2008 census Musheirifa's population was counted with Bayada and together their population was 3,100.

== Geography ==
The village is located on a group of hills overlooking the Jezreel Valley, which gives it its name "The High Places". The Ba'ana river flows through the village. In the middle of the village there is a spring which used to provide water to the residents until it dried in recent years. There is another spring some 3 kilometres (1.9 mi) from the village called "Ayn AlHajar" (Arabic: عين الحجر), or "Stone Spring". It was used for irrigation and as a recreational site for the residents. The spring still flows but the amount of water decreased over the years. Around the spring are mint plants.

== See also ==
- Arab localities in Israel

== Bibliography ==
- Barron, J.B., ed. (1923). Palestine: Report and General Abstracts of the Census of 1922. Government of Palestine.
- Conder, C.R.; Kitchener, H.H. (1882). The Survey of Western Palestine: Memoirs of the Topography, Orography, Hydrography, and Archaeology. Vol. 2. London: Committee of the Palestine Exploration Fund.
- Government of Palestine, Department of Statistics (1945). Village Statistics, April, 1945.
- Hadawi, S. (1970). Village Statistics of 1945: A Classification of Land and Area ownership in Palestine. Palestine Liberation Organization Research Centre.
- Mills, E., ed. (1932). Census of Palestine 1931. Population of Villages, Towns and Administrative Areas. Jerusalem: Government of Palestine.
- Palmer, E.H. (1881). The Survey of Western Palestine: Arabic and English Name Lists Collected During the Survey by Lieutenants Conder and Kitchener, R. E. Transliterated and Explained by E.H. Palmer. Committee of the Palestine Exploration Fund.
