= Zalafa =

Zalafa: זלפה; زلفة
- Location within Haifa region of Israel Location within Israel
- Coordinates: 32°32′56″N 35°11′17″E
- Grid position: 167/217 PAL
- Country: Israel
- District: Haifa
- Council: Ma'ale Iron
- Founded: 17th century

Population (mid-2016)
  - Total: 4,639
- Name meaning: "The cisterns" or "Hard Soil"

Zalafa (Arabic: زلفة, Hebrew: זלפה) is an Arab village in Israel's Haifa District. The village is in the Wadi Ara area of the northern Triangle, 4 kilometres (2.5 mi) northeast of Umm al-Fahm. Since 1996, it has been under the jurisdiction of the Ma'ale Iron local council whose headquarters is in the village. The village is divided into three neighborhoods: East, West and al-Murtafi'a. In mid-2016, Zalafa's population was 4,639, all of whom are Muslim.

== History ==
According to archeological evidence, Zalafa location has been settled continuously since the Iron Age, but with a decline in the Ottoman era. Building foundations, burial tombs, potsherds from the Byzantine era and an ancient well can be found under the village.

=== Ottoman Empire ===
In 1870, French explorer Victor Guérin found Zalafa "almost completely deserted", and in the 1870s it was described as "a small ruined village with a well" by the PEF's Survey of Western Palestine (SWP). In 1870/1871 (1288 AH), an Ottoman census listed the village in the nahiya of Shafa al-Gharby.

During the 19th and first half of the 20th century, Zalafa was one of the settlements of the so-called "Fahmawi Commonwealth" established by Hebronite clans belonging to Umm al-Fahm. The Commonwealth consisted of a network of interspersed communities connected by ties of kinship, and socially, economically and politically affiliated with Umm al Fahm. The Commonwealth dominated vast sections of Bilad al-Ruha/Ramot Menashe, Wadi 'Ara and Marj Ibn 'Amir/Jezreel Valley during that time.

The village's clay and straw houses were built close to each other for security reasons. Clan divisions were reflected in the distribution of the houses. Zalafa's residents drew water from nearby springs and the village lacked basic services such as schools, clinics, local government, banks, etc. Following the Jewish migration to Palestine, many of Zalafa's residents worked in Jewish-owned fields and settlements. In addition to being a new source of income, this work experience instilled in the residents advanced skills that improved their way of life.

=== British Mandate ===
In the 1922 census the population of the village was 156, all of whom were Muslim. In the 1931 census there were 198 Muslim residents living in 43 houses, increasing to 340 in the 1945 statistics. In 1944/45 a total of 2,677 dunums of village land was allocated for grains, 65 dunums were irrigated or used for orchards, and 8 dunams were classified as built-up areas.

In addition to agriculture, residents practiced animal husbandry which formed was an important source of income for the town. In 1943, they owned 161 heads of cattle, 10 sheep over a year old, 220 goats over a year old, 23 horses, 2 mules, 51 donkeys, 590 fowls, and 132 pigeons.

=== Israel ===
==== 20th century ====
During the 1948 Arab-Israeli War, the village and the surrounding area came under Iraqi control. In March 1949, Jordanian forces replaced the Iraqi forces in Wadi Ara.

On 3 April 1949, Israel and Jordan signed an armistice agreement, in which Israel would receive the Wadi Ara area, including Zalafa. In 1949, Givat Oz was established near the village.

Zalafa is one of the villages of Wadi Ara that lacked municipal status after the establishment of Israel. On 16 January 1979, Interior Minister Yosef Burg offered to establish a local council for Zalafa which would have included nearby Aqqada (800 metres (2,600 ft) from Zalafa), Swisa (1,400 metres (4,600 ft) from Zalafa) and al-Murtafi'a (connected to the village), which were in the municipal boundaries of Umm al-Fahm. The residents of Aqqada and Swisa refused the arrangement and considered their villages as part of Umm al-Fahm, though they already received civil services such as water and education from Zalafa. Burg doubted that Zalafa could bear the financial and administrative burden of having a local council, since the population of Zalafa at the time was 1,700 and with the three other villages, 2,100; thus it would have been a very small local council.

Zalafa was under the administration of mukhtars (village headmen), who were appointed by the Interior Ministry until 1992, when the Interior Ministry established the Nahal Iron regional council, including seven other villages. The locals objected to the administrative arrangement and sought independent municipal status for each village. To allay local concerns, the Interior Ministry established an investigative committee to examine other options, and in 1996, decided to split the regional council into two local councils: Ma'ale Iron, which includes Zalafa, and Basma. Al-Murtafi'a is today part of Zalafa.

==== 21st century ====
Between 2004 and 2010 the seat of Ma'ale Iron has been in a building in Zalafa leased by the local council.

== Geography ==
The village is situated on a high hill, which allowed the residents to better defend themselves. It borders the Megiddo Regional Council to the north, with Givat Oz to the northeast and the municipal boundaries of Umm al-Fahm on the south. It is situated 1,600 metres (5,200 ft) west of the West Bank. Zalafa's soil is fertile with an abundance of underground water, which aided the development of agriculture, the village's primary source of income and sustenance in its early history. Wadi Zalafa, a stream of the Kishon River, flows through the center of the village, dividing it into two parts: Zalafa al-Gharbiyya (=West) and Zalafa al-Sharkiyya (=East). North of the village is another stream that flows into the Kishon River as well.

== Demographics ==
According to the 2008 census of the Central Bureau of Statistics (CBS), Zalafa had 4,000 residents, 99.8% of them Muslim.
45.0% were under age 17, 51.3% were aged 18–64 and 3.7% were over 65. The median age was 20.

Development of the population
Year	1922	1931	1945	1961	1972	1983	1995	2008	2016
Population	156	198	340	721	1,190	1,796	2,592	4,000	4,639

== Economy ==
According to the 2008 CBS census, 29% of residents were in the annual civilian labour force; 49.3% of the men and 8.2% of the women. 53.2% of the male workforce worked in construction; 9% in manufacturing; 8.2% in wholesale, retail trade, and Auto Mechanism; 7.5% in transport, storage, and communications; and the rest in other sectors. 88.9% of the female workforce worked in education and 11.1% in transport, storage, and communications.

== Sports ==
Zalafa has a local football team called "Hapoel Bnei Zalafa", participating in Liga Bet. The team hosts matches in a soccer fields located in Umm el-Fahm.

== See also ==
- Arab localities in Israel

== Bibliography ==
- Barron, J.B., ed. (1923). Palestine: Report and General Abstracts of the Census of 1922. Government of Palestine.
- Conder, C.R.; Kitchener, H.H. (1882). The Survey of Western Palestine: Memoirs of the Topography, Orography, Hydrography, and Archaeology. Vol. 2. London: Committee of the Palestine Exploration Fund.
- Government of Palestine, Department of Statistics (1945). Village Statistics, April, 1945.
- Guérin, V. (1875). Description Géographique Historique et Archéologique de la Palestine (in French). Vol. 2: Samarie, pt. 2. Paris: L'Imprimerie Nationale.
- Hadawi, S. (1970). Village Statistics of 1945: A Classification of Land and Area ownership in Palestine. Palestine Liberation Organization Research Centre.
- Mills, E., ed. (1932). Census of Palestine 1931. Population of Villages, Towns and Administrative Areas. Jerusalem: Government of Palestine.
- Morris, B. (2004). The Birth of the Palestinian Refugee Problem Revisited. Cambridge University Press. ISBN 0-521-00967-7.
- Palmer, E.H. (1881). The Survey of Western Palestine: Arabic and English Name Lists Collected During the Survey by Lieutenants Conder and Kitchener, R. E. Transliterated and Explained by E.H. Palmer. Committee of the Palestine Exploration Fund.
- Zertal, A. (2016). The Manasseh Hill Country Survey: Volume 3: From Nahal ‘Iron to Nahal Shechem'. BRILL. ISBN 9004312307.
