= Arab Israeli Dialogue =

1974 film

- Directed by: Lionel Rogosin
- Produced by: Shunmugam A. Pillay
- Starring: Rashid Hussein, Amos Kenan
- Cinematography: Louis Brigante
- Edited by: Louis Brigante
- Release date: 1974
- Running time: 39 minutes
- Country: United States
- Language: English

Arab Israeli Dialogue is the tenth and final film directed by American independent filmmaker Lionel Rogosin. It is a filmed debate between the Palestinian poet Rashid Hussein and Israeli writer Amos Kenan, shot in the basement of Rogosin's Bleecker Street Cinema by Louis Brigante. The two participants discuss the conflict between their respective peoples and the increasingly distant possibility of peace.

Though Rogosin would live until 2000, he did not complete another film in his lifetime, causing him immense personal and artistic frustration.

The movie has been restored by the Cineteca di Bologna as part of work done on all productions by Lionel Rogosin on the hundredth anniversary of his birth.

The 2022 film, Imagine Peace directed by Rosogin's son, Michael A. Rogosin, revisits the topic and explores the making of the 1974 film and the developments in the Levant that have taken place since.

== See also ==
- List of American films of 1974
