= Mu'awiya, Basma =

Mu'awiya: מועאוויה; معاوية
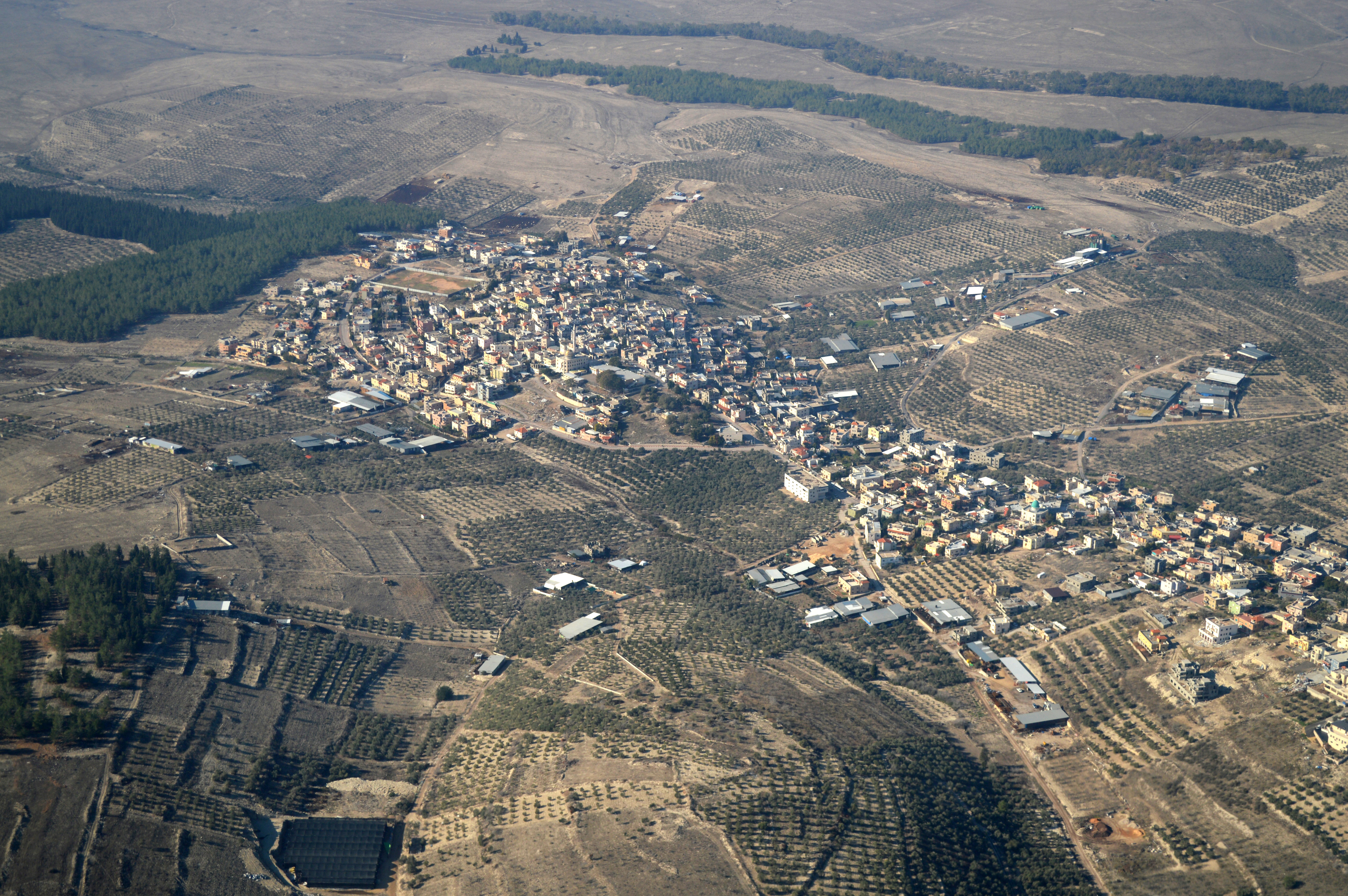
- Aerial photo of Mu'awiya

- Location within Haifa region of Israel
- Coordinates: 32°31′45″N 35°6′11″E
- Grid position: 160/215 PAL
- District: Haifa

Area
  - Total: 613 dunams (61.3 ha; 151 acres)

Population
  - Total: 3,100
  - Density: 5,100/km^{2} (13,000/sq mi)
- Name meaning: Kh. el Mâwîyeh, the ruin of the place of shelter

Mu'awiya (Arabic: معاوية, Hebrew: מועאוויה) is an Arab village in Israel's Haifa District. The village is in the Wadi Ara area of the northern Triangle and lies between Kfar Kara and Umm el-Fahm. The village has around 3,100 residents. Since 1996, it has been under the jurisdiction of the Basma local council. The village is divided into two neighborhoods: eastern and western. The residents of the village belong to two clans: Ighbarieh and Mahmid.

== History ==
=== Ottoman Empire ===
In 1517, the area of Mu'awiya was incorporated into the Ottoman Empire with the rest of Palestine. During the 16th and 17th centuries, mu'awiya was a cultivated plot of land that belonged to the Turabay Emirate (1517-1683), which encompassed also the Jezreel Valley, Haifa, Jenin, Beit She'an Valley, northern Jabal Nablus, Bilad al-Ruha/Ramot Menashe, and the northern part of the Sharon plain.

The village was named after Sheikh Mu'awiya, whose maqam lies between the two parts of the village. During the 19th and first half of the 20th century, Mu'awiya was one of the settlements of the so-called "Fahmawi Commonwealth" established by Hebronite clans belonging to Umm al-Fahm. The Commonwealth consisted of a network of interspersed communities connected by ties of kinship, and socially, economically and politically affiliated with Umm al Fahm. The Commonwealth dominated vast sections of Bilad al-Ruha/Ramot Menashe, Wadi 'Ara and Marj Ibn 'Amir/Jezreel Valley during that time.

Andrew Petersen, an archaeologist specialising in Islamic architecture, surveyed the ancient shrine at Mu'awiya in 1994. According to local tradition, Muawiya had been a soldier in the army of Saladin. He had been killed in a battle close by the village, and he and twelve of his men were buried here. The shrine, named Shaykh Muawiya, is a domed square building, with the entrance to the north. The floor of the shrine is about 0,3 meters below the surface, and contain a cenotaph, incorporating marble columns. There is a mihrab in the wall to the south, just behind the cenotaph, and the west wall has a window. According to local tradition the shrine was built about 100 years ago. However, Petersen found that the structure itself suggested it was considerably older, with rebuilding in the late nineteenth century.

In 1882, the Palestine Exploration Fund's Survey of Western Palestine described Khurbet el Mawiyeh as: "a small ruined khan, of no great antiquity, on the road, near a spring."

=== British Mandate ===
In the 1922 census of Palestine, conducted by the British Mandate authorities, Mawiyeh had a population of 112 Muslims, increasing in the 1931 census when Mu'awiya had 141 people in 30 houses.

In the 1945 statistics the population of Mu'awiya was counted with that of Umm al-Fahm.

In addition to agriculture, residents practiced animal husbandry which formed was an important source of income for the town. In 1943, they owned 227 heads of cattle, 548 sheep over a year old, 76 goats over a year old, 12 horses, 50 donkeys, 645 fowls, and 135 pigeons.

=== Israel ===
During the 1948 Arab-Israeli War the village and the surrounding area came under Iraqi control. In March 1949 Jordanian forces replaced the Iraqi forces in Wadi Ara. During the war refugees from the villages of Sabbarin, Khubbayza, Al-Kafrayn and Al-Butaymat settled in the village. On 3 April 1949 Israel and Jordan signed the 1949 Armistice Agreements, in which Israel would receive the Wadi Ara area. On 20 April 1949, Mu'awiya was occupied by Israeli forces and was later annexed to Israel along with the rest of the Wadi Ara villages. The Israeli army ordered the 500 residents to leave the village for a few hours and then demolished the entire village. The villagers appealed to the military governor of Umm El-Fahm, who said the action was illegal and that he will bring the matter to the Knesset. Although the villagers were allowed to return in mid 1950 they received no compensation for their travails; much of the village land was also expropriated. Many villagers who had lost their land had to find work outside of the village. Most of the agricultural lands were converted to olive trees.

In 1995 the village was united with Ein as-Sahala and Barta'a west, and in 1996 the Basma local council to administer the three villages.

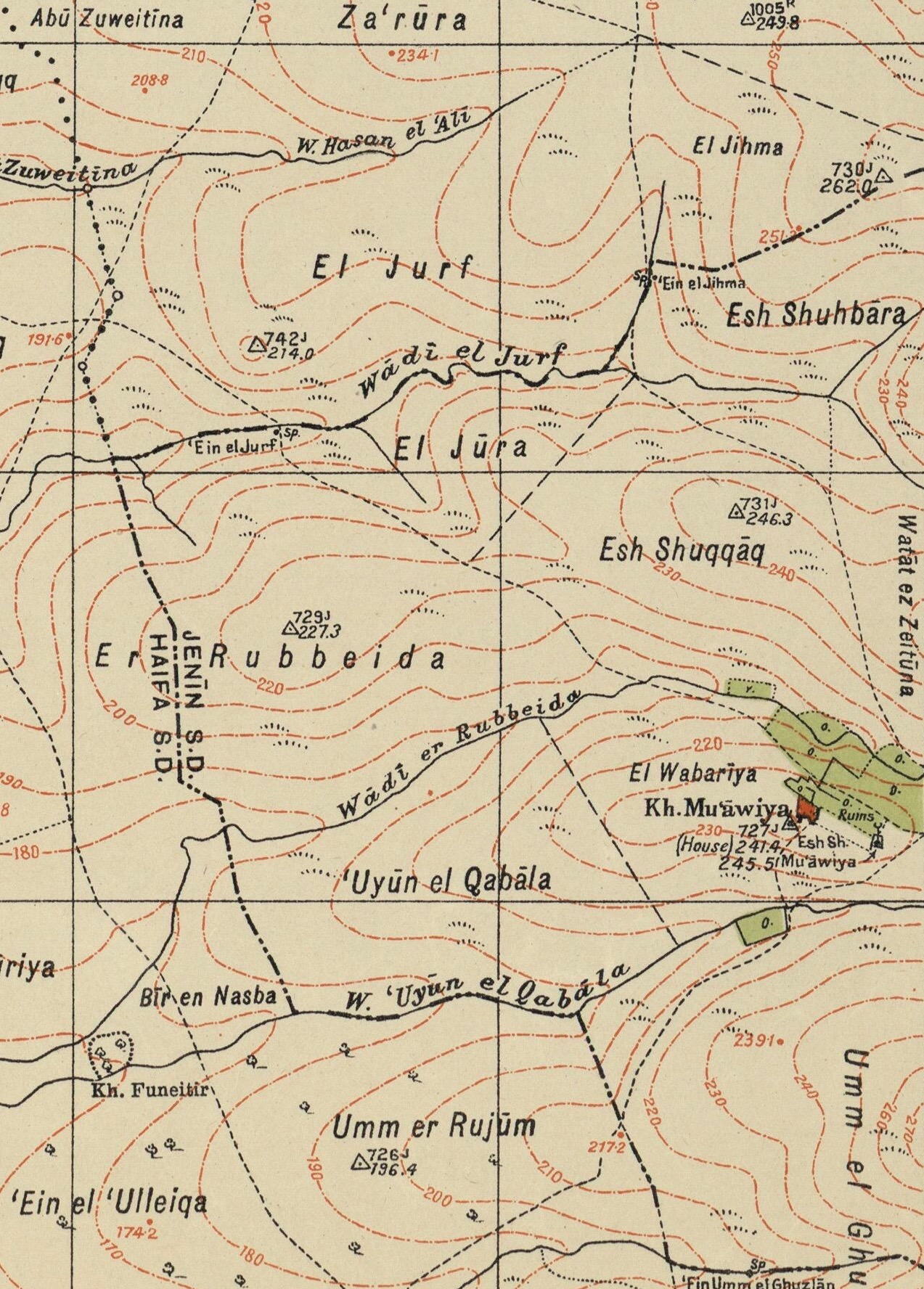
Mu'awiya 1942 1:20,000

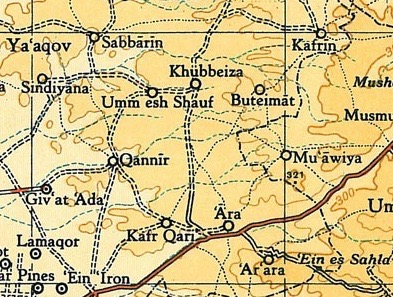
Mu'awiya 1945 1:250,000

== Geography ==
Mu'awiya lies between the Barkan and Panther rivers and is divided into two parts: Mu'awiya on the east, and Khirbet Mu'awiya on the west. Between the village's parts lies the maqam (shrine) of Sheikh Mua'wiya and next to them there are several hundred year old oak trees, that were preserved by the locals because of the sanctity of the site.

== Education ==
Mu'awiya has one high school with over 700 students, an elementary school with over 400 students and eight kindergartens.

== Sports ==
Mu'awiya has a local football club called "Hapoel Mu'awiya Ironi" with a youth team participating in Noar Alef League, which is the second tier out of four. The team hosts matches in a football field located in Barta'a.

== Bibliography ==
- Barron, J.B., ed. (1923). Palestine: Report and General Abstracts of the Census of 1922. Government of Palestine.
- Conder, C.R.; Kitchener, H.H. (1882). The Survey of Western Palestine: Memoirs of the Topography, Orography, Hydrography, and Archaeology. Vol. 2. London: Committee of the Palestine Exploration Fund.
- Government of Palestine, Department of Statistics (1945). Village Statistics, April, 1945.
- Hadawi, S. (1970). Village Statistics of 1945: A Classification of Land and Area ownership in Palestine. Palestine Liberation Organization Research Center.
- Mills, E., ed. (1932). Census of Palestine 1931. Population of Villages, Towns and Administrative Areas. Jerusalem: Government of Palestine.
- Palmer, E.H. (1881). The Survey of Western Palestine: Arabic and English Name Lists Collected During the Survey by Lieutenants Conder and Kitchener, R. E. Transliterated and Explained by E.H. Palmer. Committee of the Palestine Exploration Fund.
- Petersen, Andrew (2001). A Gazetteer of Buildings in Muslim Palestine (British Academy Monographs in Archaeology). Vol. 1. Oxford University Press. ISBN 978-0-19-727011-0.
