= Giv'at Oz =

Place in Northern Israel

Giv'at Oz: גִּבְעַת עֹז, גבעת עוז (Hebrew)
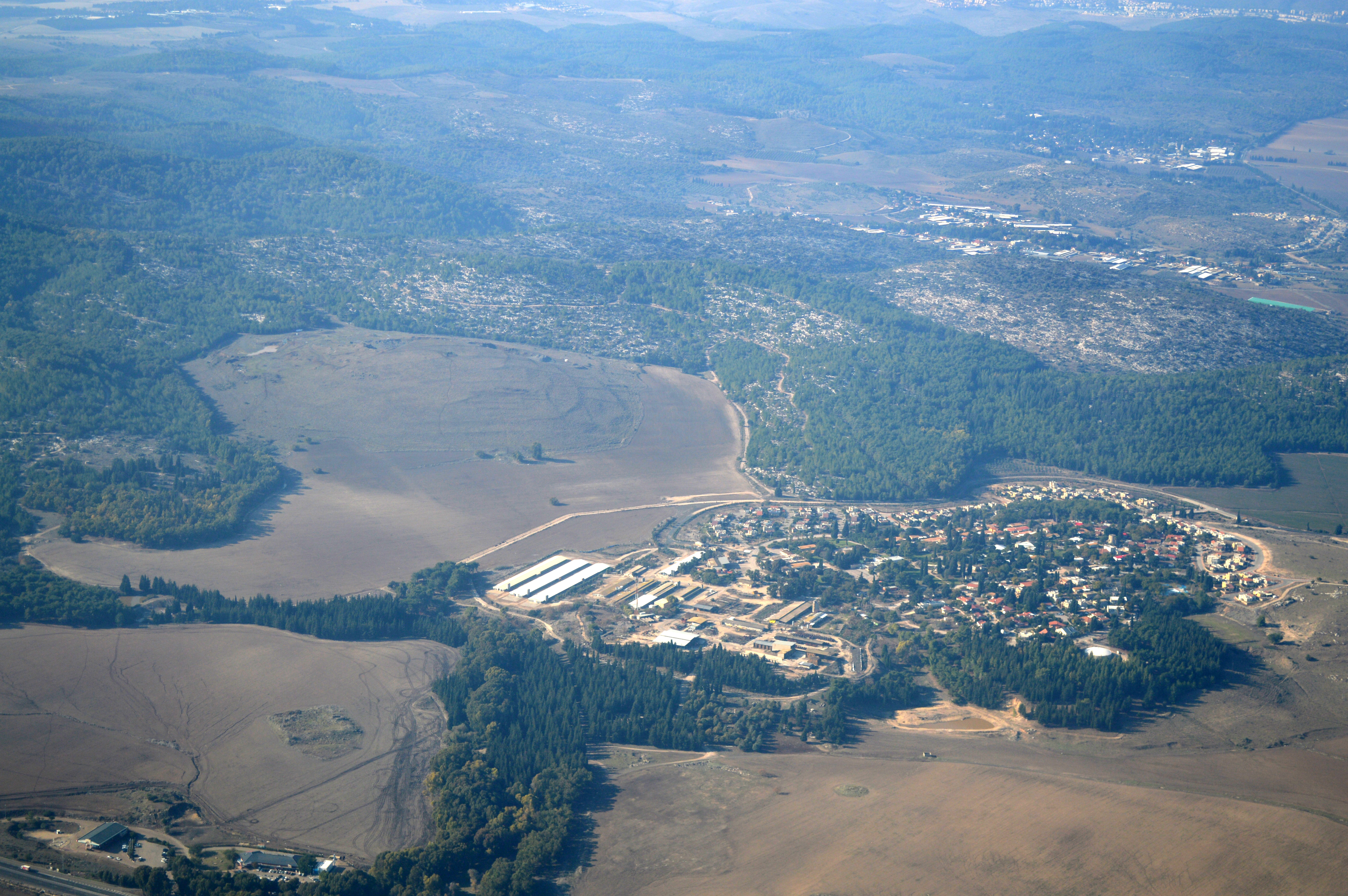
- Aerial photo of Giv'at Oz and its surrounding area

- Location within Jezreel Valley region of Israel
- Coordinates: 32°33′20″N 35°12′1″E
- Country: Israel
- District: Northern
- Subdistrict: Jezreel
- Council: Megiddo
- Affiliation: Kibbutz Movement
- Founded: 20 September 1949
- Founder: Hungarian Jews
- Population (2024): 470

Giv'at Oz (Hebrew: גִּבְעַת עֹז, lit. 'Hill of Strength') is a kibbutz in northern Israel. Located in the Jezreel Valley between Umm al-Fahm and Afula, it falls under the jurisdiction of Megiddo Regional Council. In 2024 it had a population of 470. The kibbutz lies north to Zalafa and Salem and Highway 66 runs near it.

== Etymology ==
Giv'at Oz was named after the Battle of Mishmar HaEmek which occurred during the 1947–1948 Civil War in Mandatory Palestine.

== History ==
The territory on which Giv'at Oz was built was transferred from Transjordan to Israel as part of the Israeli–Jordanian Armistice Agreement of 1949.

In 1948 Holocaust survivors from Hungary, members of Hashomer Hatzair, established a gar'in named "Yas'ur". The members received training in Hungary and in some kibbutzim in Israel. On 20 September 1949, the gar'in members established the kibbutz near the Arab village of Zalafa. In its early years the kibbutz suffered from a lack of water, which was brought in tankers from Afula. In 1953 the water company Mekorot connected the kibbutz to a water system, allowing the agriculture sector to develop. In later years, Jewish immigrants from Brazil and members of various youth movements joined the kibbutz. In the kibbutz's first year, Jordanian forces stole a flock of five hundred sheep from the kibbutz after a brief fight. Most of the sheep were brought back thanks to the UN intervention. Until 1967 Giv'at Oz had the legal status of a border settlement, which gave it the right to have war reparations as it was built near the West Bank which was then controlled by Jordan.

In the late 1950s Giv'at Oz established good relations with the nearby Arab villages Zalafa and Salem when a Kupat Holim health clinic was built in the kibbutz and also served the nearby villages. Later the kibbutz provided water and transportation services to the villages and social contact was built up between both communities as the Arab villagers started learning Hebrew.

Towards the Six-Day War in 1967, trucks and tractors as well as many of the residents were conscripted to the army in May of that year. Youth from cities volunteered to help the kibbutzim that lay near the border in bringing the harvest and villagers from Zalafa and Salem also helped the kibbutz when many of its men were conscripted. In the first hours of the war, the Jordanian army shelled the kibbutz, which suffered from minor damage, as well as other kibbutzim near the Jordanian border. Israeli forces later passed through the kibbutz and entered the Jordanian-controlled West Bank to capture Jenin. Three Jordanian hunter jets attacked an Israeli convoy in the kibbutz; the workshop was damaged and an Israeli lieutenant was injured.

The kibbutz remains cooperative and offers welfare services to the residents.

== Economy ==
In the early 1980s, the "Aromor" fragrance factory was established in order to reduce the kibbutz's dependency on agriculture. By 2011 the factory provided 40% of the local budget. In 2014 it was sold to the American Company International Flavors & Fragrances.

== Bibliography ==
- Bernet, Michael (August 2004). The Time of the Burning Sun: Six Days of War, Twelve Weeks of Hope. Chester and West. p. 44. ISBN 0975582518.
