= Ein as-Sahla =

Ein as-Sahla: עין א-סהלה; عين السهلة
- Location within Haifa region of Israel
- Coordinates: 32°29′25″N 35°07′02″E
- Grid position: 161/210 PAL
- District: Haifa
- Founded: 19th century

Population
  - Total: ~2,000
- Name meaning: "Spring of the Plain"

Ein as-Sahla (Arabic: عين السهلة, Hebrew: עין א-סהלה) is an Arab village in Haifa District, Israel. The village is located in the Wadi Ara area of the northern Triangle. The village has about 2,000 residents. Since 1996, it has been under the jurisdiction of the Basma local council. The vast majority of the residents in Ein as-Sahla adhere to Islam.

== History ==
Flint tools from the Epipalaeolithic (possibly Kebarrian) and Neolithic eras have been found here, as has pottery sherds from the Persian and Hellenistic eras.

=== Ottoman Empire ===
According to oral tradition of the residents, the founder of the Kabha clan moved from Bayt Jibrin to Ya'bad in the 18th century. Some of the clan members left Ya'bad in the mid-19th century searching for sources of living, and they found a spring with pastures for their cattle and bought the lands around it and established Barta'a. Ein as-Sahla was established as a daughter village of Barta'a in the 19th century.

=== British Mandate ===
During the British Mandate rule, the village was within the boundaries of Ar'ara.

=== Israel ===
During the 1948 Arab–Israeli War the village and the surrounding area came under Iraqi control. In March 1949 Jordanian forces replaced the Iraqi forces in Wadi Ara. On 3 April 1949 Israel and Jordan signed an armistice agreement, in which Israel would receive the Wadi Ara area.

After Israeli independence, the population of the village increased and martial law was implemented, which led to the settlement becoming a separate village in 1963. In 1973 the first mosque, named Abu Bakr Al-sidik, was built and in 1989 the second one, named Al-Huda Mosque, was built.

Ein as-Sahla lacked municipal status after the establishment of Israel and was under the administration of mukhtars (village headmen) appointed by the Interior Ministry. In 1992, the Interior Ministry established the Nahal Iron regional council, which included Ein as-Sahla and seven other villages. The locals objected to this administrative arrangement, and sought independent municipal status for each village. To allay local concerns, the Interior Ministry established an investigative committee to examine other options, and in 1996, decided to split the regional council into two local councils, Ma'ale Iron and Basma, which includes Ein as-Sahala.

== Education ==
Ein as-Sahla has five kindergartens and an elementary school with 19 classes.

== Geography ==
Ein as-Sahla occupies Mount Al-Khataf, which overlooks Wadi Ara. In the middle of the village there is a spring which gives it its name "Spring of the Plain". The village has a neighbourhood on the foot of the hill which has 350 residents. The village is surrounded by nature, which attracts tourists. The only established entrance to the village is through Ar'ara.

== Sports ==
Ein as-Sahla has a local football club called "Hapoel Ein Sahla", participating in Liga Bet. The club has an adult and a youth team and they host matches in a soccer fields located in Barta'a.

== Bibliography ==
- Palmer, E. H. (1881). The Survey of Western Palestine: Arabic and English Name Lists Collected During the Survey by Lieutenants Conder and Kitchener, R. E. Transliterated and Explained by E.H. Palmer. Committee of the Palestine Exploration Fund.
- Zertal, Adam (2016). The Manasseh Hill Country Survey. Vol. 3. Boston: BRILL. ISBN 9004312307.
