= Rashid Hussein =

Palestinian poet (1936–1977)

- راشد حسين
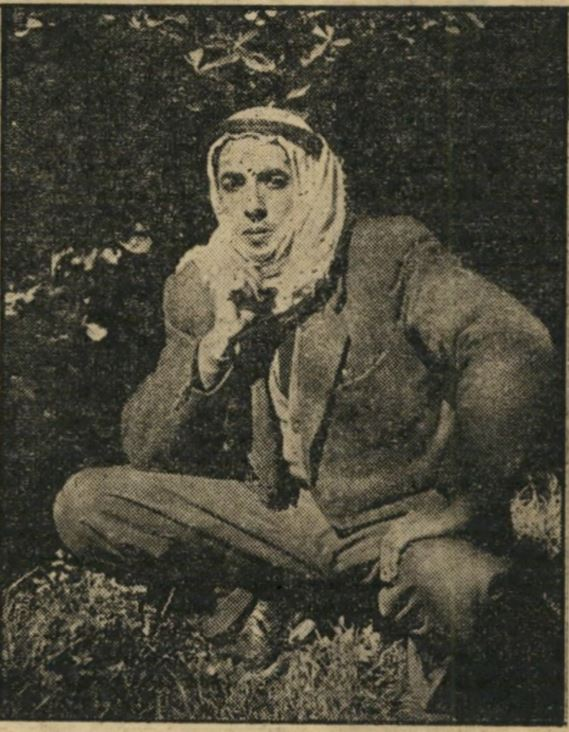
- Rashid Hussein, March 1958
- Born: 28 December 1936; Musmus, British Mandate of Palestine
- Died: 2 February 1977 (aged 41); New York City, United States
- Resting place: Musmus, Palestine
- Occupations: Poet, translator and orator
- Writing career
- Period: 1957–1977
- Genre: Arabic poetry

Rashid Hussein Mahmoud (Arabic: راشد حسين, Hebrew: ראשד חוסיין; 28 December 1936 – 2 February 1977) was a Palestinian poet, orator, journalist and Arabic-Hebrew translator. He was born in Musmus, Mandatory Palestine. He published his first collection in 1957. He was the first prominent poet to appear on the Israeli Arab stage. Palestinian poet Mahmoud Darwish called him "the star", who wrote about "human things" like bread, hunger and anger.

== Biography ==
=== Early life and teaching career ===
Hussein was born to a Muslim Fellah family in Musmus in 1936, during British Mandatory rule in Palestine. He attended elementary school in Umm al-Fahm, a town near his home village. He was educated in Nazareth, where he graduated from Nazareth Secondary School. Hussein described himself as a "lax Muslim", once writing in 1961, "I do not pray and I do not go to the mosque and I know that in this I am disobeying the will of God ... thousands of people like me are lax in fulfilling the divine precepts. But these disobedient thousands did not keep silent about what our pious judges who pray and fast, have kept silent".

In 1955 he worked as a teacher in Nazareth, a career which British critic Emile Marmorstein described as "stormy". He taught poor, rural Arabs in dilapidated schoolrooms lacking sufficient textbooks. During his teaching career, he had ongoing struggles with the Zionist supervisors of Arab education in Israel and with the Arab section of the national teachers' union.

=== Literary career ===
In 1952, Hussein began writing poetry. Two years later, he published his first poetry collection. In 1957, he published a small volume in Nazareth called Ma'a al-Fajr ("At Dawn"). In 1958, he became the literary editor of Al Fajr, a monthly Arabic-language newspaper of the Histadrut labor union and Al Musawwar, a weekly newspaper. At the time, the Iraqi Jewish critic Eliahu Khazum described Hussein as "the most promising Arab poet in Israel", the "only one interested in the study of Hebrew" and who surprised an audience of Jewish and Arab writers by "reciting his first poem he wrote in Hebrew". That year he published another Arabic volume called Sawarikh ("Missiles").

By 1959, he had translated numerous Arabic poems to Hebrew and vice versa, and also translated the works of German poet Bertolt Brecht, Turkish poet Nâzım Hikmet, Congolese leader Patrice Lumumba, and the Persian poet Ashub into Arabic. Hussein was also a member of the left-wing Israeli political party, Mapam, and edited its social weekly Al Mirsad. In the spring of 1961, Al Mirsad became a daily, but soon after the August 1961 Knesset election, it reverted to its former weekly format. Al Fajr and Al Musawwar were both discontinued for lack of funds in 1962, but the former circulated again in 1964. At that time, Hussein began translating the Hebrew works of Israeli poet Hayim Nahman Bialik into Arabic.

Hussein collaborated with Jewish poet Nathan Zach as a co-editor and translator of Palms and Dates, an anthology of Arab folk songs. In the foreword of Palms and Dates, published soon after the 1967 Six-Day War, they noted the difference between the nostalgia of past "days of greater liberalism and empathy" with the present "days of hatred and violence". Moreover, they expressed their hope that the anthology would foster dialogue between the communities and appreciation of each culture's literature.

=== Political activism ===
Hussein wrote that humiliation, discrimination and arbitrary decision-making characterized the conditions of Arabs at the hands of the Israeli state, and often criticized David Ben-Gurion, various Israeli governments, the upper echelons of the bureaucracy and Arabs he considered collaborators with the authorities. At the same time, he made appeals to his "Jewish compatriots", particularly those in the workers' parties to adhere to the universal principles of their progressive movements and to fight against Arab inequality in Israel.

While much of Hussein's writing was in agreement with Mapam's ideology and platform, he diverged significantly with the party through his public support for Egypt's pan-Arabist president, Gamal Abdel Nasser. He accused the Voice of Israel radio's Arabic-language service of being strongly biased against Nasser, while positive towards Nasser's Arab rivals, including Abd al-Karim Qasim of Iraq, Habib Bourguiba of Tunisia and the Saudi royal family. He asserted that while all of the latter opposed Zionism, only Nasser consistently developed his country, combated imperialism and made strides toward Arab unity. As a Zionist party, Mapam opposed all of the aforementioned Arab figures. In the 1959 Knesset election, the conflict between Nasser and Qasim was a major issue in Israel's Arab community, dividing Nasser's Arab nationalist supporters and Qasim's communist sympathizers. Hussein's articles in Al Fajr at the time condemned Qasim and praised Nasser, so much so that one of his articles appeared in the Egyptian weekly Akher Sa'a.

Hussein decried the morale of those in his generation who sought to simply make a living instead of fighting for their rights. However, he did not blame this perceived submissiveness and aimlessness solely on the Arab youth themselves, but to the environment in which they grew up, with many having lived through the 1948 Arab-Israeli War and the 1948 Palestinian expulsion and flight. According to Hussein, the neighboring Arab states reacted to the Palestinian Arab calamity by replacing their old leadership. However, in the case of the Palestinians in Israel, the old leadership was restored to control the Arab community on behalf of the state.

In 1962, Hussein was expelled from Mapam, and his application to once again become a teacher was rejected. In 1965, Hussein moved to Paris, and two years later, he became a member of the Palestine Liberation Organization (PLO), and was stationed at its New York City office, where he worked as a Hebrew-Arabic translator. He moved to Damascus four years later, where he co-founded al-Ard, also known as the Palestinian Research Center. In 1973, he served as a broadcaster in the Syrian Broadcasting Service's Hebrew-language program. Later in the 1970s, he moved back to New York to serve as the PLO's correspondent to the United Nations.

In 197Os in New-York he collaborated with friend and director Lionel Rogosin, in particular debating with Amos Kenan in the film Arab Israeli Dialogue.

== Death and legacy ==
On 2 February 1977, Hussein died in a fire at his New York apartment. On 8 February, he was buried in Musmus, where his tomb has since served as a Palestinian nationalist symbol. Many of Hussein's works were published in a volume edited by Kamel Ballouta called The World of Rashid Hussein: A Palestinian Poet in Exile (Detroit, 1979). In Shefa-'Amr in 1980, a commemorative volume of Hussein's poems and other literary works was published, including Qasa'id Filastiniyya. Another Arabic collection of his poems, Palestinian Poems, was published in 1982. In a 1986 poem, Mahmoud Darwish, who had encountered Hussein in Cairo, commemorated his death as a sudden loss of a charismatic figure who could invigorate the Palestinian people, writing:

He came to us a blade of wine
And left, a prayer's end
He flung out poems
At Christo's Restaurant
And all of Acre would rise from sleep
To walk upon the sea
— Mahmoud Darwish, On Fifth Avenue he greeted me (1986)

In 2006, the Palestinian singer and musicologist Reem Kelani set one of Rashid’s poems to music in her song Yearning. The track was published on her album Sprinting Gazelle – Palestinian Songs from the Motherland and the Diaspora. According to Kelani, the title of Husain’s poem translates literally as 'Thoughts and Echoes', but she 'chose the English title to reflect my own yearning, and probably that of Husain, for freedom from our personal and collective sense of siege.'

The sky cried in rain, giving solace to the burnt-out man;
It made him more impassioned.

Can one drowning in the open sea ask for a helping hand from the sky?
Does he want rain to freeze his body and add to his torments?

No! I ask the sky. Stop your tears!

This broken-hearted man is at the end of his tether…
This broken-hearted man is at the end of his tether.

== Poetry and influences ==
Hussein's poetry was influenced by the 11th-century Arab skeptic al-Ma'arri and the early 20th-century Lebanese American poet Elia Abu Madi. Marmorstein wrote:

The choice of these two mentors is clearly relevant to the experience of those Palestinian Muslims who found themselves reduced from majority to minority status. For the scepticism and pessimism of Abu'l-'Ala al-Ma'arri reflect an age of social decay and political anarchy in Islam while Iliya Abu Madi who emigrated in 1911 to the U.S.A., represents the capacity of Arabic literature both to survive in and to be enriched by a non-Arab environment.

His earlier works were of an austere, classical Arabic variety, but gradually Hussein introduced more freedom to his use of the classical metres and his poetry became more satirical. In his prose, Hussein used the traditional gallows humor of German Jews and Syrian Arabs from the Ottoman era as introductions to his rhetorical descriptions of Arab suffering in Israel.

== Bibliography ==
- Boullata, Kamal; Ghossein, Mirène, eds. (1979). The World of Rashid Hussein, a Palestinian Poet in Exile. Detroit: Association of Arab-American University Graduates. ISBN 9780937694077.
- Marmorstein, Emile (October 1964). "Rāshid Husain: Portrait of an Angry Young Arab". Middle Eastern Studies. 1 (1): 3–20. doi:10.1080/00263206408700002. JSTOR 4282100.
- Somekh, Sasson (Spring 1999). ""Reconciling Two Great Loves" the First Jewish-Arab Literary Encounter in Israel". Israel Studies. 4 (1): 1–21. JSTOR 30245725.
