= Tura al-Gharbiya =

Tura al Gharbiya
- Municipality type D (Village council)

Arabic transcription(s)
  - Arabic: طوره الغربيه
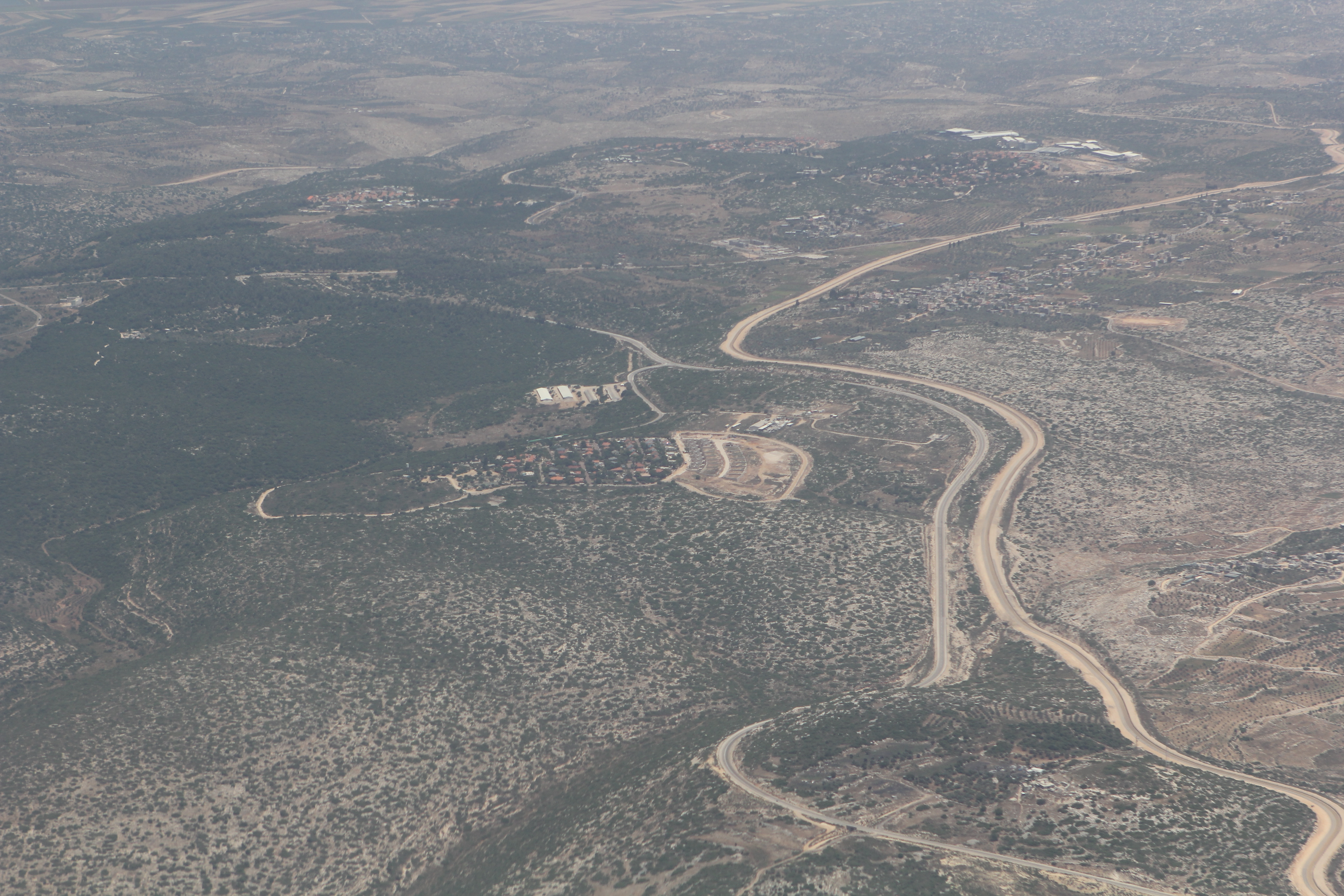
- Tura al Gharbiya, in the distance

- Location of Tura al Gharbiya within Palestine
- Coordinates: 32°28′07″N 35°09′07″E
- Palestine grid: 164/208
- State: State of Palestine
- Governorate: Jenin

Government
  - Type: Village council

Population (2017)
  - Total: 1,053

Tura al Gharbiya (Arabic: طوره الغربيه) is a Palestinian town in the Jenin Governorate in the Northern area of the West Bank, located 14 kilometers West of Jenin close to the separation barrier. According to the Palestinian Central Bureau of Statistics, the town had a population of over 1,110 inhabitants in mid-year 2006 and 1,053 in 2017. The healthcare facilities for the surrounding villages are based in Tura al Gharbiya, the facilities are designated as MOH level 1.

== History ==
In the 1945 census, during the British Mandate era, Khirbat Tura el Gharbiya was counted with Barta'a, and together they had a population of 1,000 Muslims with 20,499 dunams of land, according to an official land and population survey. 464 dunams were used for plantations and irrigable land, 1,957 dunams for cereals, while 1,900 dunams were non-cultivable land.

=== Jordanian era ===
In the wake of the 1948 Arab–Israeli War, and after the 1949 Armistice Agreements, Tura al-Gharbiya came under Jordanian rule.

The Jordanian census of 1961 found 336 inhabitants in Tura Gharbiya.

=== Post 1967 ===
Since the Six-Day War in 1967, Tura al-Gharbiya has been under Israeli occupation.

== Bibliography ==
- Government of Jordan, Department of Statistics (1964). First Census of Population and Housing. Volume I: Final Tables; General Characteristics of the Population (PDF).
- Government of Palestine, Department of Statistics (1945). Village Statistics, April, 1945.
- Hadawi, S. (1970). Village Statistics of 1945: A Classification of Land and Area ownership in Palestine. Palestine Liberation Organization Research Center.
