= Barta'a =

Coordinates: 32°28′28″N 35°05′32″E

Barta'a برطعة
- Town
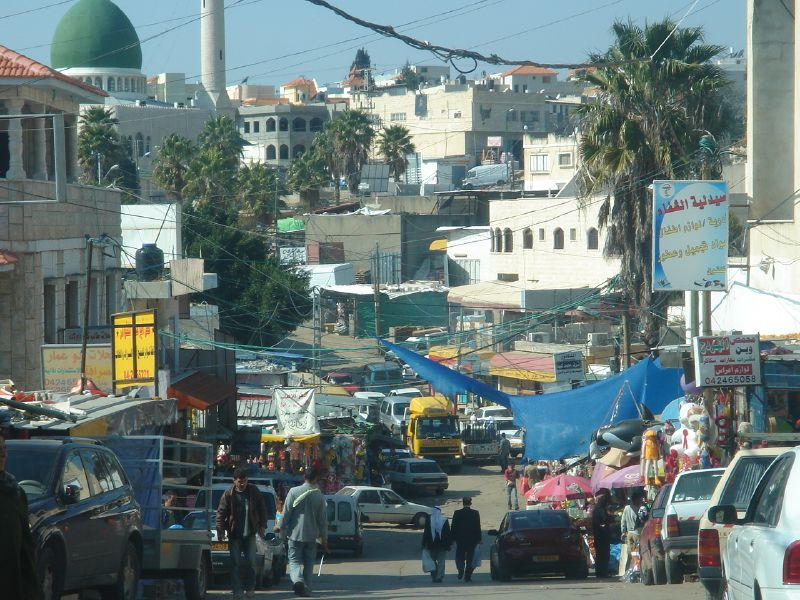
- Interactive map of Barta'a
- Location within Haifa region of Israel
- Country: Israel (Western); Palestine (Eastern)
- District / Governorate: Haifa / Jenin
- Control: Israel

Area
  - Total: 4.3 km^{2} (1.7 sq mi)

Population (2006)
  - Total: 8,300
- Time zone: UTC+2 (IST)
  - Summer (DST): UTC+3 (IDT)

Barta'a (Arabic: برطعة) is an Arab village located in the northern triangle area and Nahal Iron. The Green Line separating Israel and the West Bank splits the village into two parts. Historically, the residents of Barta'a faced challenges related to this bifurcation, impacting their social and economic interactions. In recent years, efforts have been made to reunify the village, facilitating the integration of its eastern and western sections.

== History ==
Ceramics from the Byzantine era have been found in Barta'a.

=== Ottoman Empire ===
In 1517 Barta'a was incorporated into the Ottoman Empire with the rest of Palestine. During the 16th and 17th centuries, it belonged to the Turabay Emirate (1517–1683), which encompassed also the Jezreel Valley, Haifa, Jenin, Beit She'an Valley, northern Jabal Nablus, Bilad al-Ruha/Ramot Menashe, and the northern part of the Sharon plain.

In 1882, the PEF's Survey of Western Palestine described it as "a ruined Arabic village on a high hill, with a spring in the valley to the north 400 feet below." The village of Barta'a was established in the middle of the 19th century by members of the Kabha tribe. According to oral traditions, the tribe moved in the middle of the 18th century from Bayt Jibrin to Ya'bad. In the middle of the 19th century, some of the Kabhaites left Ya'bad in search of a living area and purchased the land of Barta'a, where they found a spring and grazing land. In time, Barta'a developed and was built around it by satellite villages, also belonging to the sons of Kabha: Umm al-Qutuf, 'Ein al-Sahala, Wadi' Ara and Tura al-Arabiya.

=== British Mandate ===
In the 1922 census of Palestine, conducted by the British Mandate authorities, Barta'a had a population of 468, all Muslim, increasing in the 1931 census to 692, still all Muslims, in 94 houses.

In the 1945 estimates, the village plus Khirbat Tura el Gharbiya had a population of 1,000 Muslims with 20,499 dunams of land, according to an official land and population survey. 464 dunams were used for plantations and irrigable land, 1,957 dunams for cereals, while 1,900 dunams were non-cultivable land.

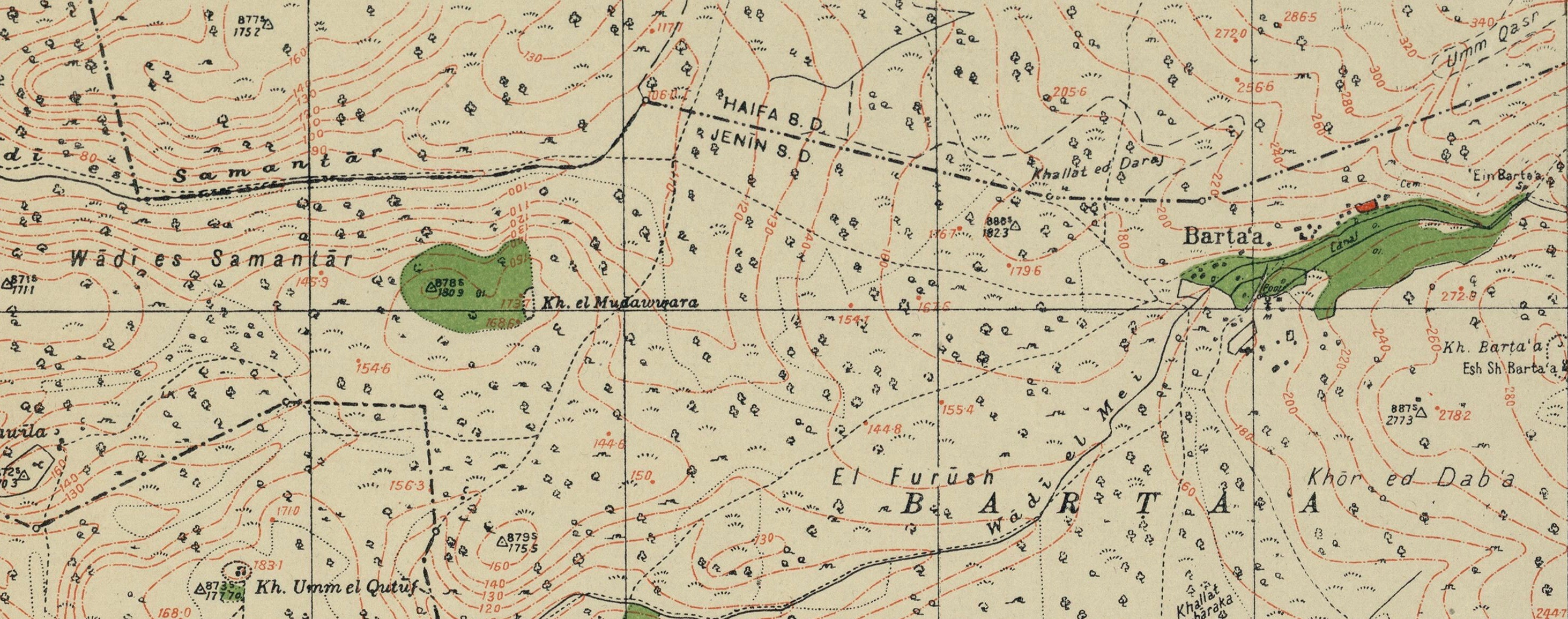
Barta'a 1942 1:20,000

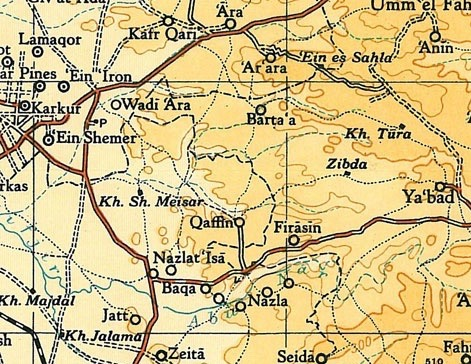
Barta'a 1945 1:250,000

=== Israel ===
==== 20th century ====
After the 1948 Arab-Israeli War, the village of Barta'a was divided by the 1949 armistice into eastern and western parts. The western part fell under Israeli control, while the eastern part fell under Jordanian control. From 1949 to 1967, travel between the two halves was practically impossible. In the armistice agreements at the end of the War of Independence, the village was divided into two, on the basis of the Wadi al-Umiya outline, which crosses the village and constitutes a convenient natural border. Its north-western part was transferred to Israel with about a third of the population (500 people), while its eastern-southern part, which is located on the hilltop, was incorporated into Jordan with about 1,000 residents. The distance between the houses of Barta'a in Israel and the houses of Barta'a in Jordan was a few dozen meters and in some places only a few meters. In the first years after the 1948 War the villagers moved almost freely between the two parts of the village. The residents of Barta'a used to go to the mosque in the Jordanian section, and the mukhtar was in charge of the two parts of the village. As a result, the village was a convenient place for meetings between Israeli Arabs and their relatives who lived in Jordan. In May 1955, the Jordanian authorities evacuated the refugees who settled in East Barta'a from the area, in order to make it difficult to smuggle into Israel. In March 1956, a serious border incident occurred in which an Israeli policeman and four Arabs from Jordan were killed. During the incident, most residents of East Barta'a fled their homes.

Following the 1967 Six-Day War, Israel captured the West Bank and the two parts of the town were informally reunited, operating as one municipal unit. Since many of the residents in both parts of the town belong to the same extended family (the Kabha family), the de facto "reunification" was viewed positively by town residents. Residents of East Barta'a began to work in Israel and agriculture became a source of secondary income. Thanks to the proximity to Israel, the standard of living in East Barta'a rose faster than in the rest of the West Bank. In 1978, East Barta'a was connected to electricity from generators, and in 1984, it was connected to the Israeli electricity grid. Barta'a students study at high schools in Ya'bed and Jenin. In 1995, an outline plan for East Barta'a, intended to meet the expansion needs of East Barta'a by 2015, came into effect.

==== 21st century ====
Following the Second Intifada, the village of Barta'a became an important commercial center for the residents of Wadi Ara and a large part of the Galilee residents to buy cheap goods at the prices of the Palestinian Authority after the entry of Israelis into the West Bank. Many businessmen from the West Bank relocated their businesses to East Barta'a as part of the Palestinian Authority but have access to and proximity to the target market for goods in the Wadi Ara area. With the construction of the separation fence, East Barta'a was included in an enclave located on the Israeli side of the fence, and the trend of Israelis traveling to Barta'a for cheap shopping increased. Many of the houses in the village became stores and warehouses for merchandise, and many of the villagers became rich. However, there were also allegations of harm to residents of the village who are forced to move to the towns of Ya'bed and Jenin via an IDF checkpoint.

The development of Barta'a into an important commercial center resulted in many workers' from the West Bank settling in the village regularly. This led to social tension between foreign workers and residents, who saw workers as a threat to their livelihood. In addition, the prolonged stay of workers, most of whom are young without families, has long been viewed by many as a threat to the conservative customs of the residents. In the absence of recreation and welfare centers in the village, workers tend to spend their free time on the streets of the village and next to the residential areas of the local residents. The proximity between parts of Barta'a was exploited by the terrorist organizations to smuggle people into the State of Israel. For example, the perpetrator of the Maxim restaurant suicide bombing crossed the Green Line in Barta'a.

== Barta'a enclave ==
The Israeli West Bank barrier passes east of Barta'a, separating the town from the rest of the West Bank. The portion of the town lying outside Israeli territory (Eastern Barta'a) is in what is known as the Seam Zone, an area between the Green Line and the barrier. Other towns and villages in this enclave include Umm ar-Rihan, Khirbet 'Abdallah al-Yunis, Khirbet Ash-Sheikh Sa'eed, Khirbet al-Muntar al-Gharbiya, Khirbet al-Muntar ash-Sharqiyya, and Dhaher al-Malik. There are no checkpoints to the west on the border with Israel, but long-term residents of the Barta'a enclave who do not have Israeli citizenship face fines if they leave the enclave to venture into Israel.

Access from the Barta'a enclave to the West Bank is through two entry/exit gates: Barta'a and Shaked. People who want to enter the enclave must also apply for a permit.

The market in the Barta'a enclave has become a hotspot for customers from Israel. Because the residents do not live under Israeli social system, products are cheaper than in Israel. The area is accessible for Palestinians and Israelis, and thus has become a kind of free-trade zone.

== Holy sites ==
In the Palestinian area of Barta'a, the shrine known as ash-Seikh Barta'a, or Muhammad al-Barta'wi, stands without a domed structure or gravestone. Instead, it features two prominent stone blocks, the foremost of which is marked by four rock-cut steps. Adjacent to this shrine is a sacred tree, under which the villagers traditionally performed their rituals. Legend holds that the sheikh was a warrior under Saladin, acting as a lookout during battles with the Crusaders along the coastal plain. Several traditions exist concerning the origin of the saint's name, alongside reports of miraculous events at the site.

== See also ==
- West Bank closures

== Bibliography ==
- Amara, Muhammad Hasan (1999). Politics and sociolinguistic reflexes: Palestinian border villages. John Benjamins Publishing Company.
- Barron, J. B., ed. (1923). Palestine: Report and General Abstracts of the Census of 1922. Government of Palestine.
- Conder, C.R.; Kitchener, H. H. (1882). The Survey of Western Palestine: Memoirs of the Topography, Orography, Hydrography, and Archaeology. Vol. 2. London: Committee of the Palestine Exploration Fund.
- Dauphin, C. (1998). La Palestine byzantine, Peuplement et Populations. BAR International Series 726 (in French). Vol. III : Catalogue. Oxford: Archeopress. ISBN 0-860549-05-4.
- Department of Statistics (1945). Village Statistics, April, 1945. Government of Palestine.
- Hadawi, S. (1970). Village Statistics of 1945: A Classification of Land and Area ownership in Palestine. Palestine Liberation Organization Research Center.
- Mills, E., ed. (1932). Census of Palestine 1931. Population of Villages, Towns and Administrative Areas. Jerusalem: Government of Palestine.
- Palmer, E. H. (1881). The Survey of Western Palestine: Arabic and English Name Lists Collected During the Survey by Lieutenants Conder and Kitchener, R. E. Transliterated and Explained by E.H. Palmer. Committee of the Palestine Exploration Fund.
