= Basma =

Basma: בסמ"ה; بسمة
- Local council

Hebrew transcription(s)
  - ISO 259: Basma
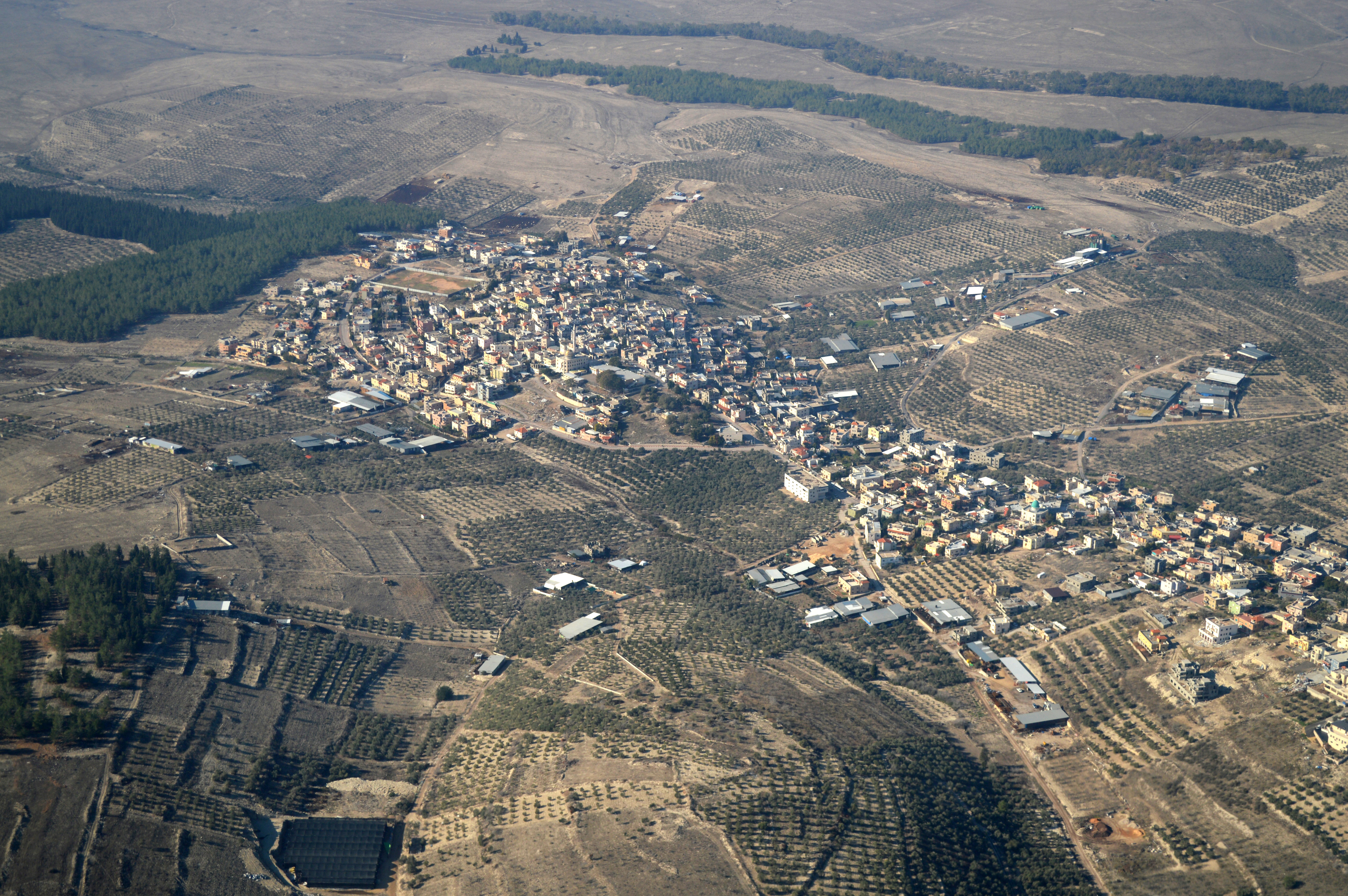
- Basma, from the air

- Location within Haifa region of Israel Location within Israel
- Coordinates: 32°30′8″N 35°6′14″E
- Country: Israel
- District: Haifa
- Subdistrict: Hadera
- Natural Region: Alexander Mountain
- Founded: 1995

Population (2024)
  - Total: 12,002

Basma (Arabic: بسمة, Hebrew: בסמ"ה) is an Israeli Arab local council in the Wadi Ara area of Haifa District. The local council was formed in 1995 through the consolidation of the villages of Barta'a West, Ein as-Sahala, and Muawiya; Basma is an acronym of the villages' names. In 2024 it had a population of 12,002. Basma's jurisdiction area covers 3,956 dunams.

== History ==
Each of Basma's villages were under the administration of a Mukhtar (village headman), who was appointed by the Interior Ministry until 1992, when the Interior Ministry established the Nahal Iron regional council, including Basma's villages and five others. The locals objected to the administrative arrangement, claiming that the council was established without consulting the locals and their wishes were not considered. Some of the villages had already sought an independent municipal status but were rejected. Most of the agricultural land was not included in the council's jurisdiction area, all of the council members were Jewish and it was given a Hebrew name. Following an appeal to the High Court of Justice, the state promised to dismantle the council and establish a regular regional council, where each village had an elected local committee. The appeal was cancelled but the locals appealed again, demanding an independent status for each village. The Ministry of Interior declared that the local concerns had been considered, but were not consistent with the ministry's policy of not creating local councils for small villages in fear of spending public money, and the High Court of Justice rejected the appeal. Eventually, in order to allay local concerns, the Interior Ministry established an investigative committee to examine other options, and in 1996, decided to split the regional council into two local councils: Ma'ale Iron, and Basma.

In 2003, Basma was included in a wide plan of the Interior Ministry to merge local and regional councils in the region of Hadera. According to the plan, Basma was to be united with Arara and Kfar Qara, while Mu'awiya will be moved to Ma'ale Iron. The plan was rejected by all councils.

== Education ==
Basma has three elementary schools for each village and two middle schools and high schools in Barta'a and Mu'awiya. There are 23 kindergartens in the council: 10 in Barta'a, 8 in Mu'awiya and 5 in Ein a-Sahala.

== Voting Patterns ==
In the 2022 election, 91 percent of voters in Basma voted for the Arab parties, while 6 percent voted for the parties of the center-left coalition led by Yair Lapid and 2 percent voted for the parties of the right-wing coalition led by Benjamin Netanyahu. Among the voters for the Arab parties, 37 percent voted for Balad, while 33 percent voted for Ra'am and 30 percent voted for the Hadash–Ta'al list.

In the 2026 election, 97 percent of voters in Basma voted for the Arab parties, while 3 percent voted for the parties of the center-left coalition led by Gadi Eisenkot and 0.2 percent voted for the parties of the right-wing coalition led by Benjamin Netanyahu. Among the voters for the Arab parties, 83 percent voted for the Joint List, while 17 percent voted for Ra'am. Voter turnout roughly doubled compared to the 2022 election.

== See also ==
- Arab localities in Israel
