= Ya'bad =

Ya'bad يعبد
- Municipality type B

Arabic transcription(s)
  - Arabic: يعبد
  - Latin: Yabad (official)
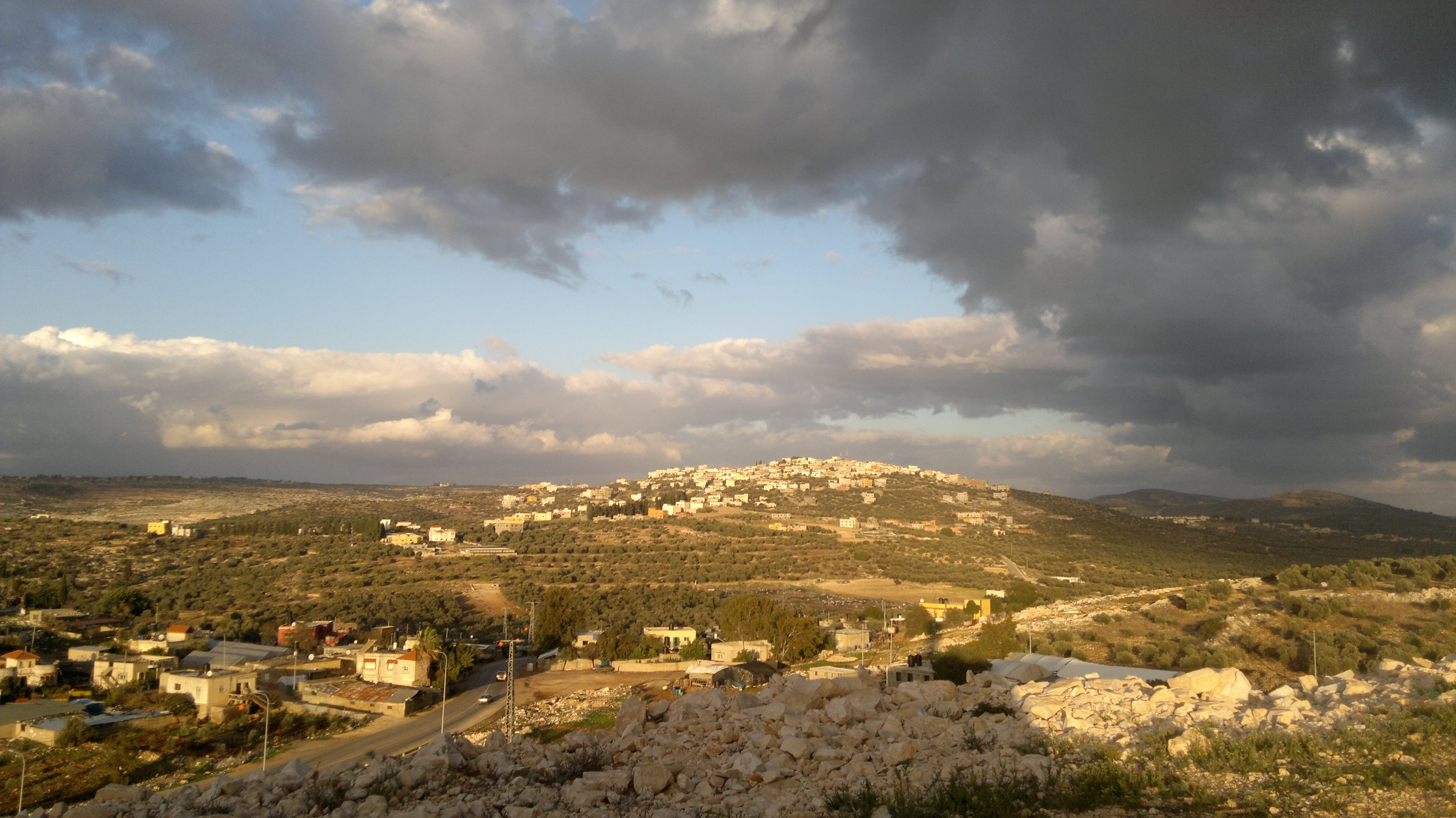
- Skyline of Ya'bad, Palestine

- Location of Ya'bad within Palestine
- Coordinates: 32°26′48″N 35°10′13″E
- Palestine grid: 166/205
- State: State of Palestine
- Governorate: Jenin

Government
  - Type: Municipality
  - Head of Municipality: Samer Abu Baker

Area
  - Total: 21.6 km^{2} (8.3 sq mi)

Population (2017)
  - Total: 16,012
  - Density: 741/km^{2} (1,920/sq mi)
- Name meaning: Yabid, p.n.

Ya'bad (Arabic: يعبد) is a Palestinian town in the northern West Bank, 20 kilometers west of Jenin, in the Jenin Governorate of Palestine. It is a major agricultural town, with most of its land covered with olive groves and grain fields. According to the Palestinian Central Bureau of Statistics, the town had a population of 13,640 in 2007 and 16,012 in 2017. Its mayor is Samer Abu Baker who was elected in 2005. The Israeli settlement of Mevo Dotan is built on Ya'bad's land.

== History ==
Pottery sherds from the Persian, Hellenistic, early Roman, Byzantine, early Muslim and the Medieval eras have been found here.

=== Ottoman era ===
In 1596 Ya'bad appeared in the defter (Ottoman tax registers) as being in the nahiya of Jabal Sami in the liwa of Nablus. It had a population of 62 households, all Muslim. They paid a tax rate of 33.3% on agricultural products, including wheat, barley, summer crops, occasional revenues, goats and beehives, and a press for olives or grapes, amounting to 18,085 akçe. Half of the revenue went to a waqf dedicated to Halil ar-Rahman.

In 1694, Abd al-Ghani al-Nabulsi, a Muslim traveler, passed by Ya'bad and noted it as "a village between Jenin and Arrabeh". Nabulsi noted that it had a local majdhūb (ascetic Muslim practitioner), a Black former slave known as "Sheikh Zā’id," who lived in a cave as a hermit and was noted for his love of coffee.

In the 17th-18th centuries, Ya'bad was renowned for producing the finest cheese in Jabal Nablus. Politically, it was ruled by the Qadri clan, which was allied with the powerful Abd al-Hadi clan of Arrabeh. In 1838, it was noted as a Muslim village, Ya'bud, located in the esh–Sha'rawiyeh esh–Shurkiyeh District.

In 1870 Victor Guérin noted Ya'bad was situated "on a hill", while in the PEF's Survey of Western Palestine (1882), Yabid was described as "a good-sized stone village, with some Christian families and two factions of Moslems, called respectively the 'Abd el Hady and the Beni Tokan, living in separate quarters. The village stands on a ridge, with a well to the south and a small separate quarter on the east, in which is a small Mukam."

=== British Mandate era ===
In the 1922 census of Palestine, conducted by the British Mandate authorities, Yabid had a population of 1,733, all Muslims, increasing in the 1931 census to a population of 2,383, still all Muslim, in 418 occupied houses.

In 1935 the prominent Arab resistance leader Izz ad-Din al-Qassam and a few of his men were killed in a cave near Ya'bad during a firefight with the British.

In the 1945 statistics the population of Ya'bad (including Khirbat el Khuljan, Khirbat et Tarim, Khirbat Tura ash Sharqiya, Nazlat Sheik Zeid and Khirbat Umm Rihan) was 3,480, all Muslims, with 37,805 dunams of land, according to an official land and population survey. 6,035 dunams were used for plantations and irrigable land, 9,955 dunams for cereals, while 92 dunams were built-up (urban) land.

=== Jordanian era ===
In the wake of the 1948 Arab–Israeli War, and after the 1949 Armistice Agreements, Ya’bad came under Jordanian rule.

The Jordanian census of 1961 found 4,709 inhabitants in Ya'bad.

=== Post-1967 ===
Since the 1967 Six-Day War, Ya'bad has been under Israeli occupation. The population of Ya'bad in the 1967 census conducted by Israel was 4,857, of whom 581 originated from the Israeli territory.

In May 1985 five village women set up a Women's Work Committee which opened a kindergarten for 60 children and started a sewing course with 32 young women.

A major charcoal mine is located near Ya'bad and most of its workers come from the town. Since the establishment of "closed-off areas" and the construction of the West Bank Barrier in the northern West Bank, Ya'bad and surrounding cities and towns have seen an increase in unemployment which reached to 88% in 2006. The annual average income has dropped "dramatically" by one-third according to the World Bank.

== Demography ==
Residents of Ya'bad originated from various locations, such as Egypt, Iraq, the area of Jerusalem, and neighboring villages.

== See also ==
- List of cities in Palestine

== Bibliography ==
- Barron, J.B., ed. (1923). Palestine: Report and General Abstracts of the Census of 1922. Government of Palestine.
- Conder, C.R.; Kitchener, H.H. (1882). The Survey of Western Palestine: Memoirs of the Topography, Orography, Hydrography, and Archaeology. Vol. 2. London: Committee of the Palestine Exploration Fund.
- Doumani, B. (1995). Rediscovering Palestine: Merchants and Peasants in Jabal Nablus. University of California Press.
- Government of Jordan, Department of Statistics (1964). First Census of Population and Housing. Volume I: Final Tables; General Characteristics of the Population (PDF).
- Government of Palestine, Department of Statistics (1945). Village Statistics, April, 1945.
- Guérin, V. (1875). Description Géographique Historique et Archéologique de la Palestine (in French). Vol. 2: Samarie, pt. 2. Paris: L'Imprimerie Nationale.
- Hadawi, S. (1970). Village Statistics of 1945: A Classification of Land and Area ownership in Palestine. Palestine Liberation Organization Research Center.
- Hütteroth, W.-D.; Abdulfattah, K. (1977). Historical Geography of Palestine, Transjordan and Southern Syria in the Late 16th Century. Erlanger Geographische Arbeiten, Sonderband 5. Erlangen, Germany: Vorstand der Fränkischen Geographischen Gesellschaft. ISBN 3-920405-41-2.
- Mills, E., ed. (1932). Census of Palestine 1931. Population of Villages, Towns and Administrative Areas. Jerusalem: Government of Palestine.
- Palmer, E.H. (1881). The Survey of Western Palestine: Arabic and English Name Lists Collected During the Survey by Lieutenants Conder and Kitchener, R. E. Transliterated and Explained by E.H. Palmer. Committee of the Palestine Exploration Fund.
- Robinson, E.; Smith, E. (1841). Biblical Researches in Palestine, Mount Sinai and Arabia Petraea: A Journal of Travels in the year 1838. Vol. 3. Boston: Crocker & Brewster.
- Segev, T. (2013). One Palestine Complete: Jews and Arabs Under the British Mandate. London: Macmillan. ISBN 978-1466843509.
- Zertal, A. (2004). The Manasseh Hill Country Survey. Vol. 1. Boston: BRILL. ISBN 9004137564.
