= Turkish Jews in Israel =

Turkish Jews who reside in Israel

Total population
- 100,000–150,000

Regions with significant populations
- Avital, Burgata, Geva Carmel, Givat Nili, Gvulot, HaGoshrim, Nahsholim, Tal Shahar, Yehud-Monosson

Languages
- Hebrew (Main language for all generations); Older generation: Ladino, French, Turkish

Religion
- Judaism

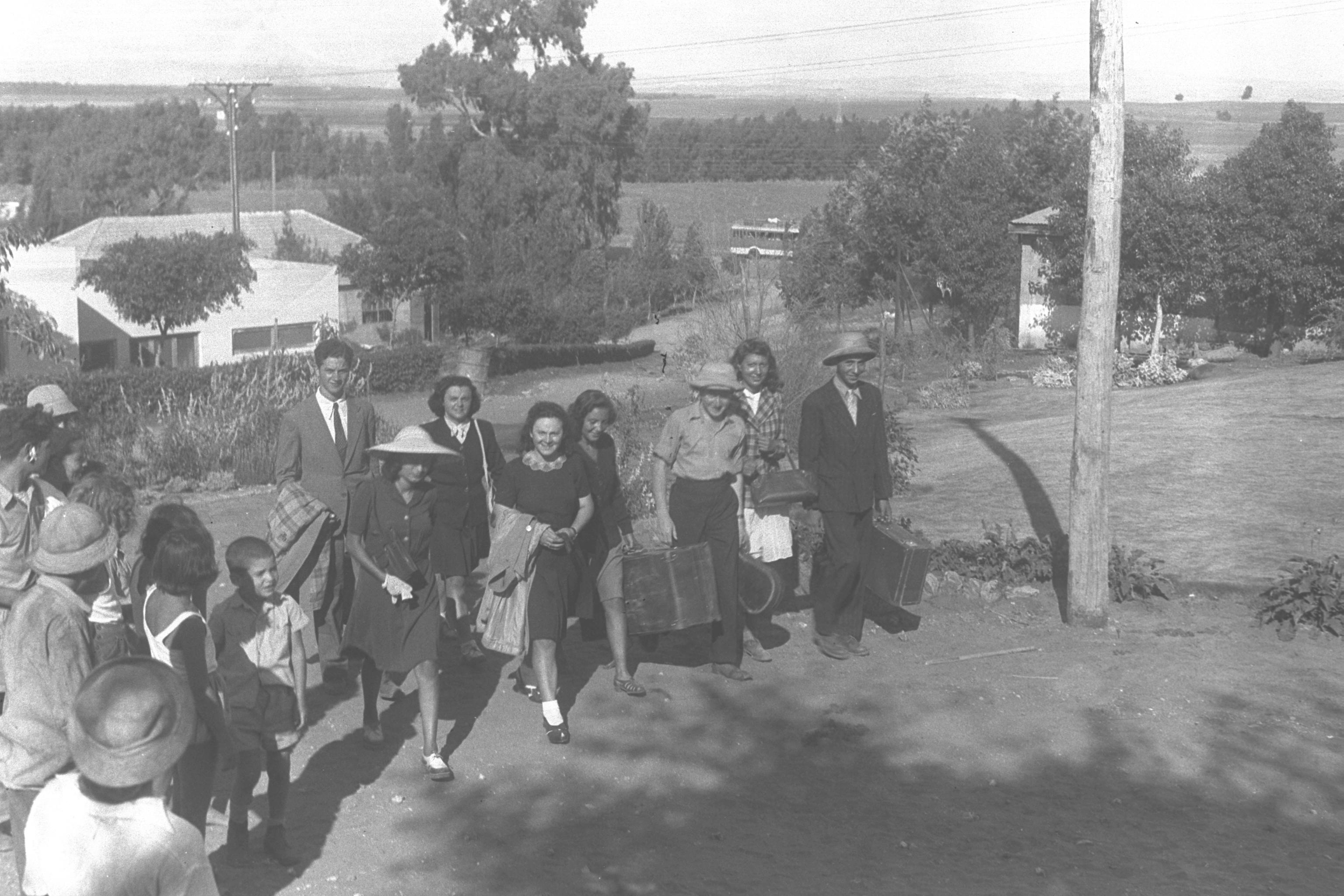
A group of new immigrants from Turkey arriving at Kibbutz Maabarot in 1943

Turkish Jews in Israel are immigrants and descendants of the immigrants of the Turkish Jewish communities, who now reside within the State of Israel. They number around 100,000–150,000.

== History ==
=== Ottoman Palestine ===
For centuries, the Jewish population of Ottoman Palestine was divided between two groups: Jewish subjects of the Turkish Sultan, who formed their own legal entity, and foreign pilgrims who lived largely on alms. During Ottoman times, the Jewish presence was concentrated to four cities.

=== Immigration history from Republic of Turkey ===
The immigration history of the Turkish Jews in Israel when the Republic of Turkey was established in 1923, Aliyah was not particularly popular amongst Turkish Jewry; migration from Turkey to Palestine was minimal in the 1920s.

Between 1923 and 1948, approximately 7,300 Jews emigrated from Turkey to Mandatory Palestine. After the 1934 Thrace pogroms following the 1934 Turkish Resettlement Law, immigration to Palestine increased; it is estimated that 521 Jews left for Palestine from Turkey in 1934 and 1,445 left in 1935. Immigration to Palestine was organized by the Jewish Agency and the Palestine Aliya Anoar Organization. The Varlık Vergisi, a capital tax which occurred in 1942, was also significant in encouraging emigration from Turkey to Palestine; between 1943 and 1944, 4,000 Jews emigrated.

The Jews of Turkey reacted very favorably to the creation of the State of Israel. Between 1948 and 1951, 34,547 Jews immigrated to Israel, nearly 40% of the Jewish population at the time. Immigration was stunted for several months in November 1948, when Turkey suspended migration permits as a result of pressure from neighboring Arab countries.

In March 1949, the suspension was removed when Turkey officially recognized Israel, and emigration continued, with 26,000 emigrating within the same year. The migration was entirely voluntary, and was primary driven by economic factors given the majority of emigrants were from the lower classes. In fact, the migration of Jews to Israel is the second largest mass emigration wave out of Turkey, the first being the Population exchange between Greece and Turkey. When most of them arrived to Israel as with many other Jews from the Middle east and North Africa they were put into Transit camps or Ma'abarot.

After 1951, emigration of Jews from Turkey to Israel slowed materially.

In the mid-1950s, 10% of those who had moved to Israel returned to Turkey. A new synagogue, the Neve Şalom was constructed in Istanbul in 1951. Generally, Turkish Jews in Israel have integrated well into society and are not distinguishable from other Israelis. However, they maintain their Turkish culture and connection to Turkey, and are strong supporters of close relations between Israel and Turkey.

In recent years during the rule of Recep Tayyip Erdogan and deteriorating relations between Turkey and Israel, rising anti-Semitism, perceived threats to the personal security of Jews in Turkey and rising anti-Jewish discrimination from Turkish society caused a new wave of emigration from Turkey to Israel.

== Settlements ==
- Avital (moshav)
- Burgata
- Florentin, Tel Aviv
- Geva Carmel
- Givat Nili
- Gvulot
- HaGoshrim
- Kerem Ben Zimra
- Nahsholim
- Tal Shahar

== Notable people ==
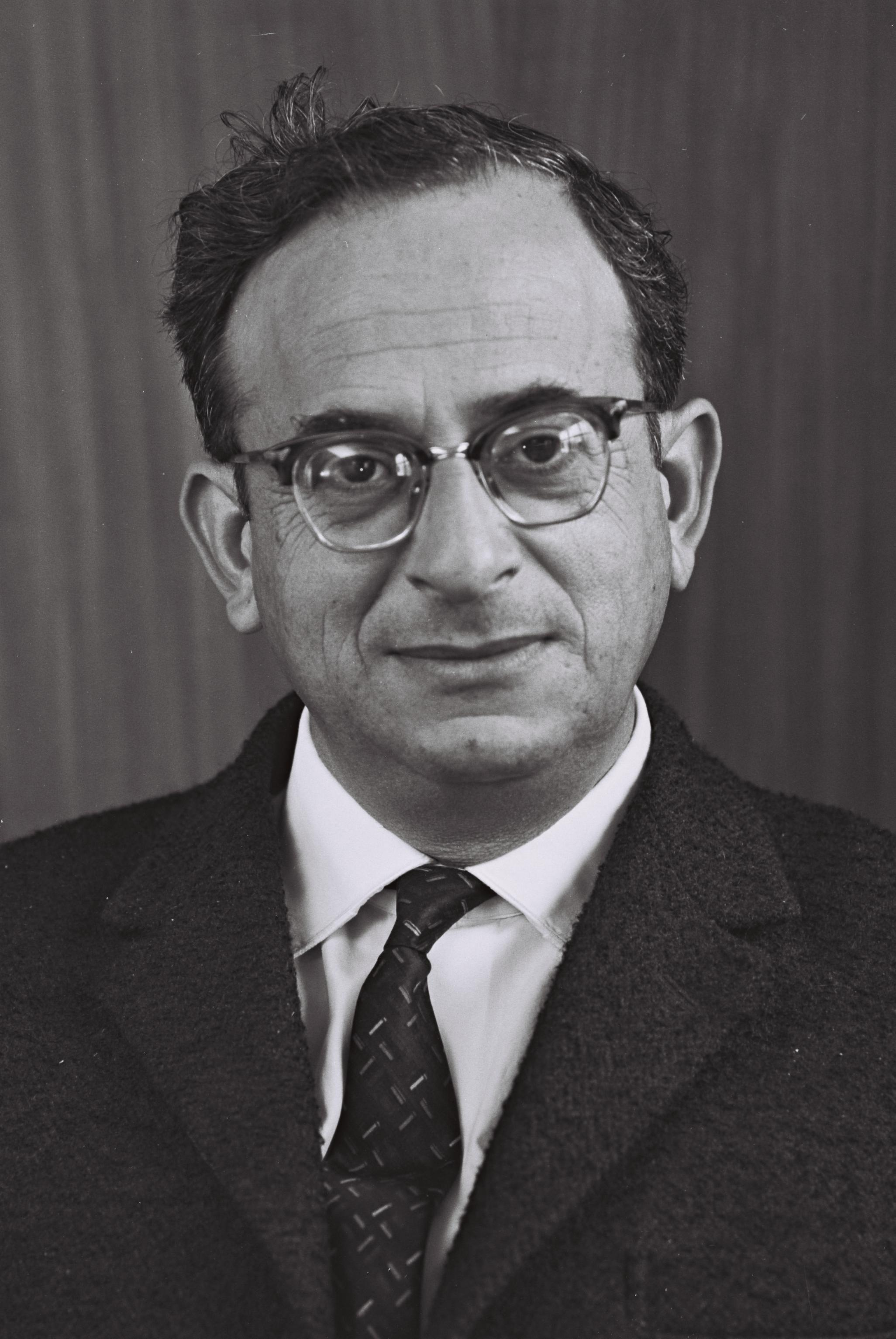
Yitzhak Navon, President of Israel (1978 to 1983)

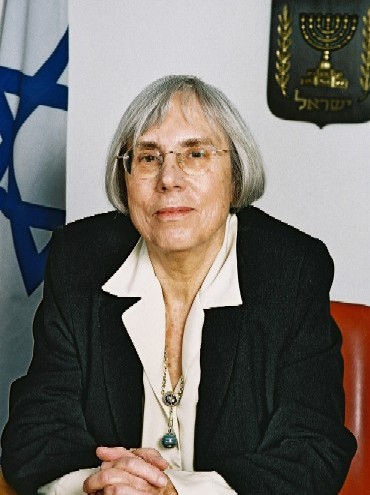
Dalia Dorner, justice of the Supreme Court of Israel (1993–2004)

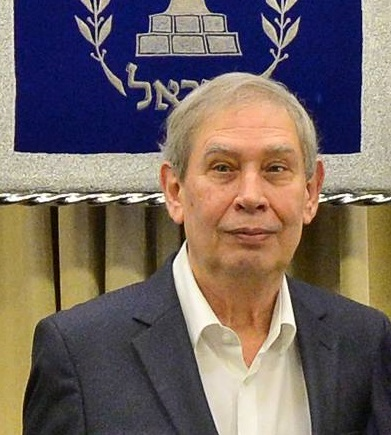
Tamir Pardo, 11th chief of Mossad

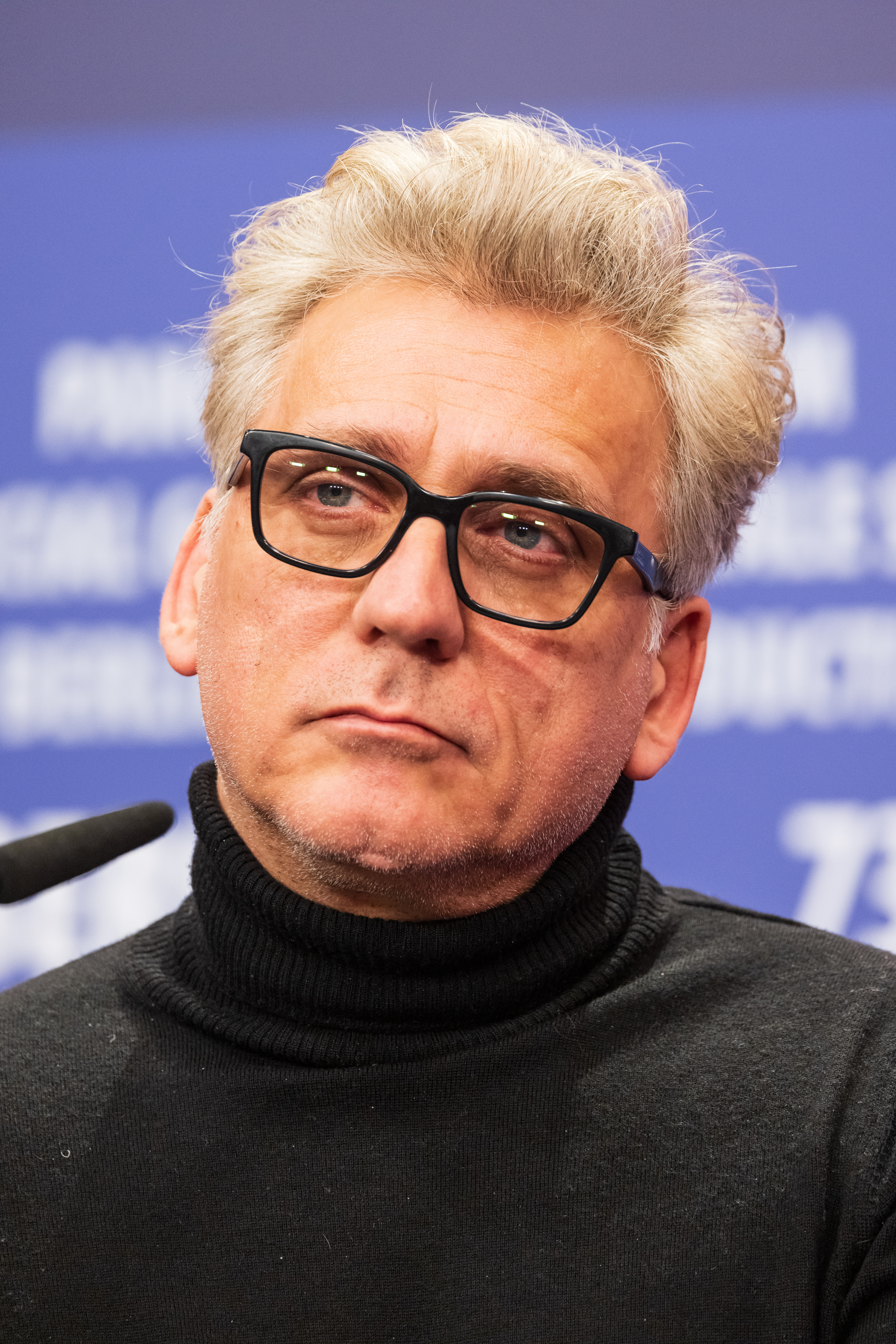
Lior Ashkenazi, actor, comedian and television presenter

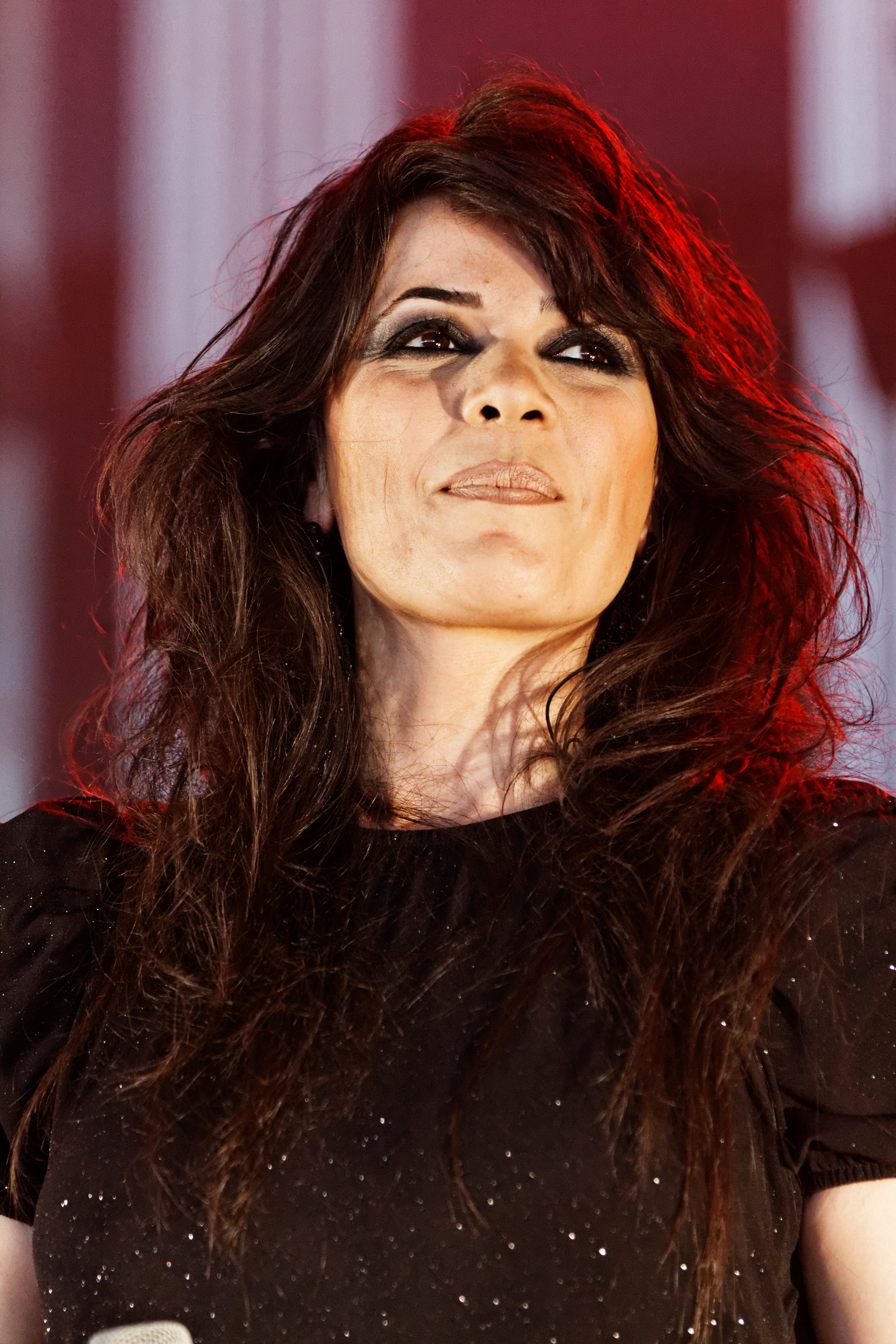
Yasmin Levy, Ladino singer

- Eli Abarbanel (born 1976), Israeli football player
- Avichay Adraee (born 1982), Israeli military officer; head of the Arab media division of the IDF Spokesperson's Unit
- Adi Ashkenazi (born 1975), Israeli actress, screenwriter and stand-up comedian
- Lior Ashkenazi (born 1968), Israeli actor, voice actor, comedian and television presenter
- Mili Avital (born 1972), Israeli actress
- Aki Avni (born 1967), Israeli actor, entertainer and television host
- Ruhama Avraham (born 1964), Israeli politician who served as a member of the Knesset
- Barak Bakhar (born 1979), Israeli former player and the current manager of Maccabi Haifa
- Pini Balili (born 1979), Israeli former football manager and former football player
- Albert Beger (born 1959), Istanbul-born Israeli saxophonist and flutist
- Avraham Ben-Shoshan (born 1940), Israeli military officer; Commander of the Israeli Navy (1985–1989)
- Arik Benado (born 1973), Israeli football manager and former player
- Assi Cohen (born 1974), Israeli comedian and actor
- Eliezer Cohen (born 1934), Israeli politician who served as a member of the Knesset
- Geulah Cohen (1925–2019), Israeli politician and activist
- Nechemya Cohen (1943–1967), Israeli soldier; the most decorated soldier in the history of the IDF
- Dalia Dorner (born 1934), Israeli-Turkish judge; justice of the Supreme Court of Israel (1993–2004)
- Edit Doron (1951–2019), Israeli linguist; professor at Hebrew University of Jerusalem
- Savi Gabizon (born 1960), Israeli filmmaker, screenwriter and producer
- Yehoram Gaon (born 1939), Israeli singer, actor, director, comedian, producer, television and radio host
- Miki Gavrielov (born 1949), Israeli composer
- Shlomo Gazit (1926–2020), Israeli military officer and academic; major general in the Israel Defense Forces, head of the Military Intelligence Directorate
- Mordechai Gazit (1922–2016), Israeli diplomat; adviser to Israeli Prime Minister Golda Meir; ambassador to France; and Director-General of the Israeli Foreign Ministry
- Erol Güney (1914–2009), Turkish-Israeli journalist, translator and author
- Umut Güzelses (born 1987), Turkish-Israeli football player
- Yolande Harmer (1913–1959), Israeli intelligence officer who operated in Egypt
- Israel Hanukoglu (born 1952), Turkish-born Israeli biochemist; professor at Ariel University; former science and technology adviser to the prime minister of Israel (1996–1999)
- Yossef H. Hatzor (born 1959), Israeli professor of Earth and Environmental Sciences at the Ben-Gurion University of the Negev
- Yaakov Hagoel (born 1971), Chairman of the World Zionist Organization
- Hila Klein (born 1987), Israeli-American YouTuber
- Liran Kohener (born 1988), Israeli model; Miss Israel 2007
- Kohava Levy (born 1946), Israeli singer, songwriter, composer and poet in Ladino
- Shabtai Levy (1876–1956), first Jewish mayor of Haifa (1940–1951)
- Yasmin Levy (born 1975), Israeli Ladino singer and songwriter
- Yitzhak Levy (1919–1977), Israeli singer, songwriter, musicologist and composer in Ladino
- Linet (born 1975), Turkish-Israeli singer
- Miriam Lichtheim (1914–2004), Turkish-born American-Israeli Egyptologist, academic, librarian and translator
- Shaily Lipa (born 1974), Israeli cookbook author, content creator and TV cookery show host
- Eliad Nachum (born 1990), Israeli singer, songwriter and television actor
- Yitzhak Navon (1921–2015), Israeli politician, diplomat, playwright, and author; 5th President of Israel; first Israeli president born in Jerusalem and the first Sephardi Jew to serve in that office
- Tamir Pardo (born 1953), Israeli intelligence officer; 11th Director of Mossad
- Rona Ramon (1964–2018), Israeli public activist and STEM influencer; widow of first Israeli astronaut Ilan Ramon
- Berry Sakharof (born 1957), Israeli rock guitarist, singer, songwriter and producer
- Ishak Saporta (born 1957), Israeli professor of business ethics at Tel Aviv University
- Moshe Sardines (1917–1984), Israeli politician who served as a member of the Knesset
- Rotem Sela (born 1953), Israeli actress best known for starring in the Israeli television series Beauty and the Baker (2013–2021)
- Shlomi Shabat (born 1954), Israeli vocalist and musician
- Moshe Shaul (1929–2023), Israeli journalist, writer and researcher of the culture of Sephardi Jews
- Moshe Bar Siman Tov (born 1976), Israeli economist and the Director-General of the Ministry of Health
- Adi Soffer (born 1987), Israeli footballer
- Avi Soffer (born 1986), Israeli football player
- Alona Tal (born 1983), Israeli actress and singer
- Roy Gokay Wol (born 1984), Turkish-Israeli film producer and director
- David Tzur (born 1959), Israeli politician and former policeman; member of the Knesset
- Benny Ziffer (born 1953), Israeli author and journalist

== See also ==
- Israel–Turkey relations
- History of the Jews in Turkey
- Maccabi S.K.
- Aliyah
- Turkish Jews
- History of the Jews in the Ottoman Empire
- History of the Jews in İzmir
- Old Yishuv
- Pre-Zionist Aliyah
- Kurdish Jews in Israel
- Arkadaş Association
- Jewish ethnic divisions
- Israeli Turkmen
