= Al-Sindiyana =

Village in Haifa subdistrict, Mandatory Palestine

Al-Sindiyana السنديانة Sindiyana, Sindianeh
- Village
- Etymology: "the evergreen oak"
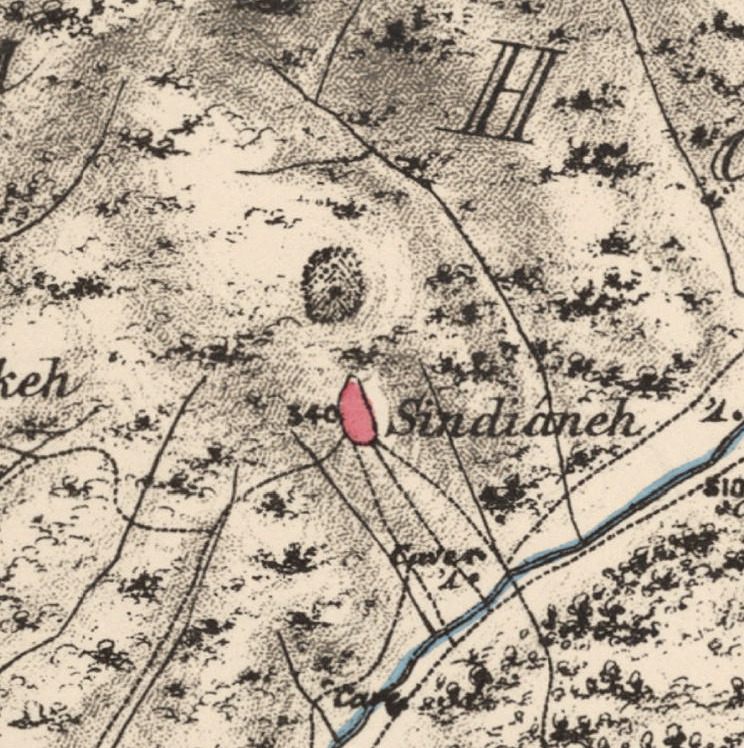
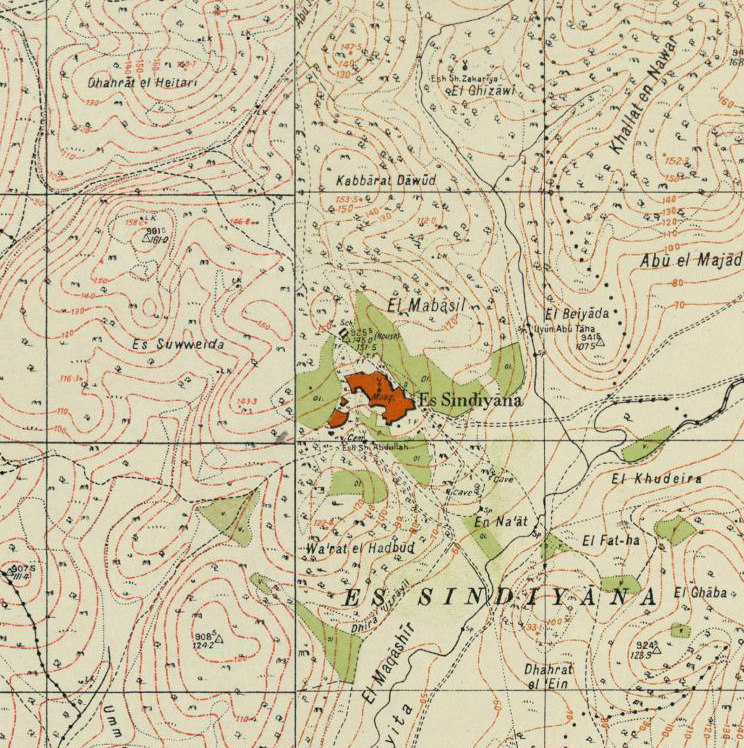
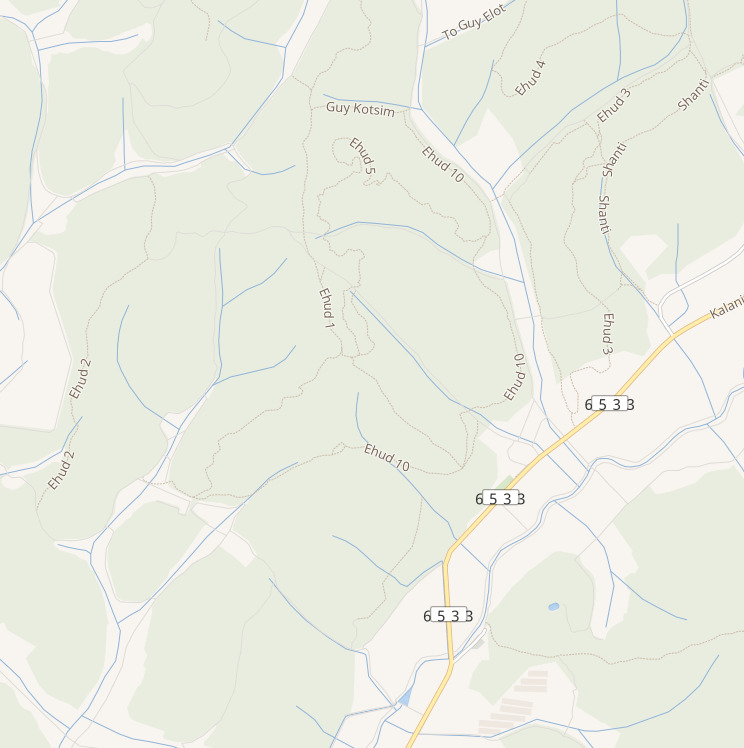
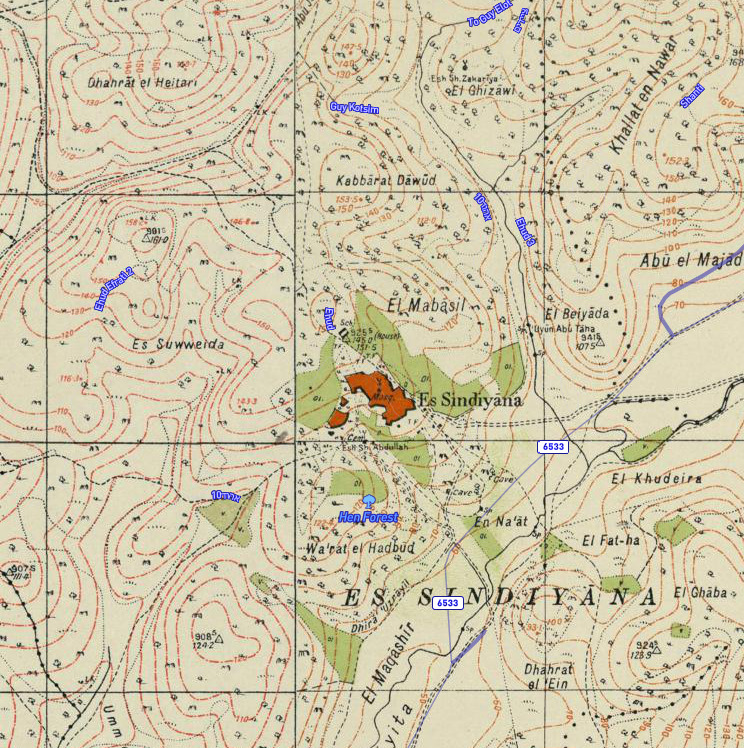
- 1870s map 1940s map modern map 1940s with modern overlay map A series of historical maps of the area around Al-Sindiyana (click the buttons)

- Location within Mandatory Palestine
- Coordinates: 32°33′31″N 35°0′2″E
- Palestine grid: 150/218
- Geopolitical entity: Mandatory Palestine
- Subdistrict: Haifa
- Date of depopulation: May 12–14, 1948

Area
  - Total: 15,172 dunams (15.172 km^{2}; 5.858 sq mi)

Population (1945)
  - Total: 1,250
- Cause(s) of depopulation: Ethnic cleansing by Yishuv forces
- Current Localities: Aviel

Al-Sindiyana (Arabic: السنديانة, Es Sindiyâna) was a Palestinian Arab village in the Haifa Subdistrict. It was depopulated during the 1947–1948 Civil War in Mandatory Palestine on May 12, 1948. It was located 29 km south of Haifa.

== History ==
=== Antiquity ===
A Samaritan inscription on a stone lintel was discovered in Al-Sindiyana, featuring 12 lines of Samaritan script, referencing the initial section of the Shema prayer, following the Samaritan version of Deuteronomy 6:4-9, with notable variations from the Masoretic text.

The stone, measuring 25 cm in height and 40 cm in width, was found inserted into a wall above the entrance of a modern house in Al-Sindiyana. The inscription, written in dots-separated words, includes a mention of the city's name "Geva" in Jewish script. The inscription concludes with lines suggesting a possible date, mentioning the "reign of Ishmael" (reference to Arab rule), potentially dating the text to shortly after the Muslim conquest in the seventh century AD.

=== Ottoman era ===
On 16 March 1799, during the Ottoman era, Napoleon had a battle here just north of the village.

In 1859, the population was estimated to be 300, who cultivated 22 feddans of land.

Victor Guérin visited the village in 1863. Transcribing its name as Sendianeh, he notes there are 400 inhabitants and that its name must derive from the Arabic word sendian, meaning "evergreen oak", as these abound on the hills flanking the village.

In 1882, the PEF's Survey of Western Palestine described Sindianeh as a "village of moderate size on high ground, with a spring below it, and a cave; it was here that the tunnel of the Cæsarea aqueduct is said to have broken into by women digging for clay".

A population list from about 1887 showed that Al-Sindiyana had about 520 inhabitants; all Muslims.

=== British Mandate era ===
In the 1922 census of Palestine, conducted by the British Mandate authorities, Al Sendianeh had a population of 576; all Muslims, increasing in the 1931 census to 923; 922 Muslim and 1 Jew, in a total of 217 houses.

Al-Sindiyana had an elementary school for boys, which by 1942-1943 had 200 students. The village had several wells and springs.

In the 1945 statistics it had a population of 1,250 Muslims, with a total of 15,172 dunams of land. Of this, a total of 8,177 dunums of land was allocated to cereals; 225 dunums were irrigated or used for orchards, while 24 dunams were built-up (urban) land.

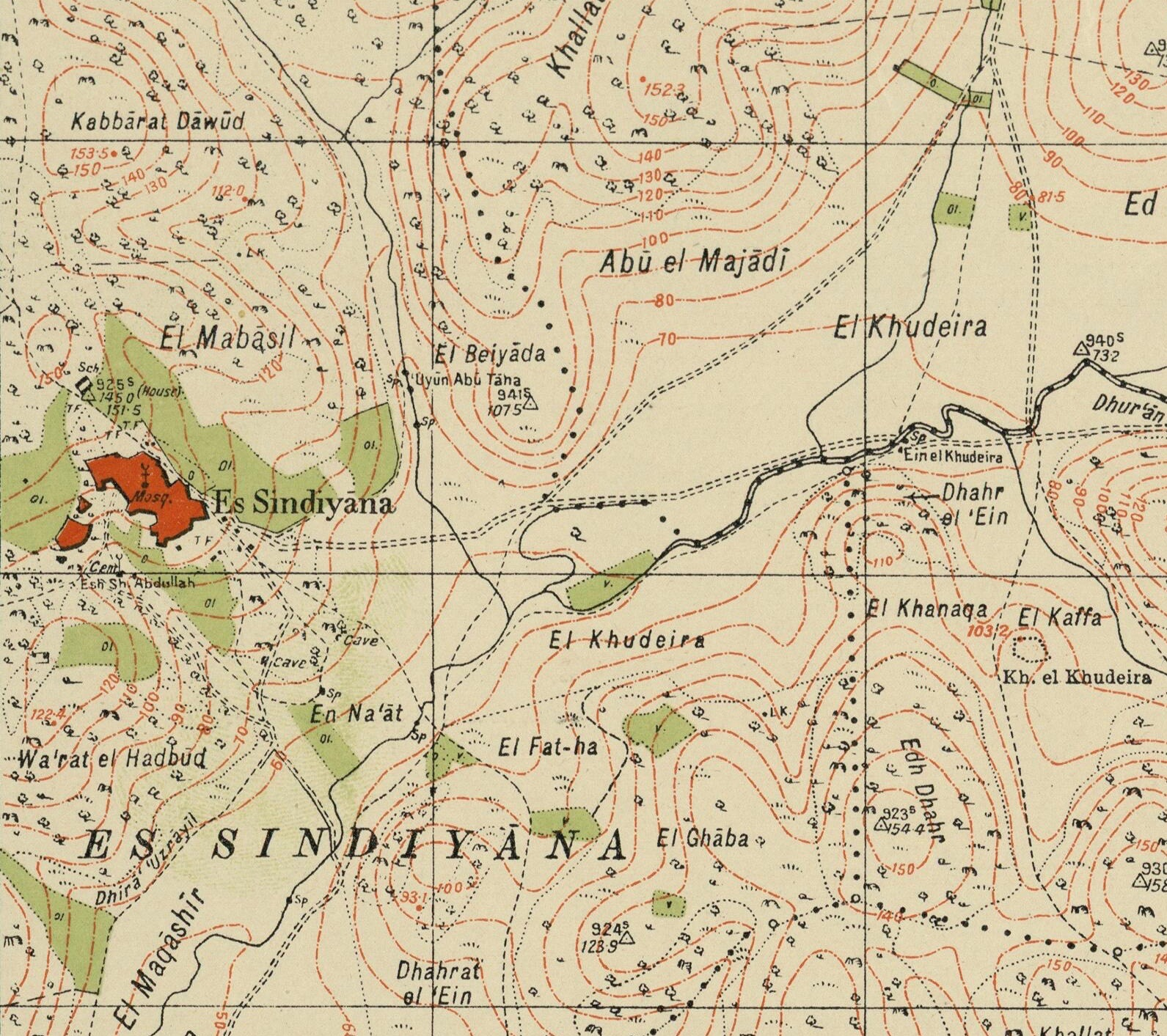
Al-Sindiyana 1942 1:20,000

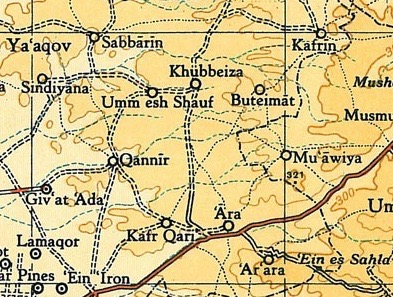
Al-Sindiyana 1945 1:250,000

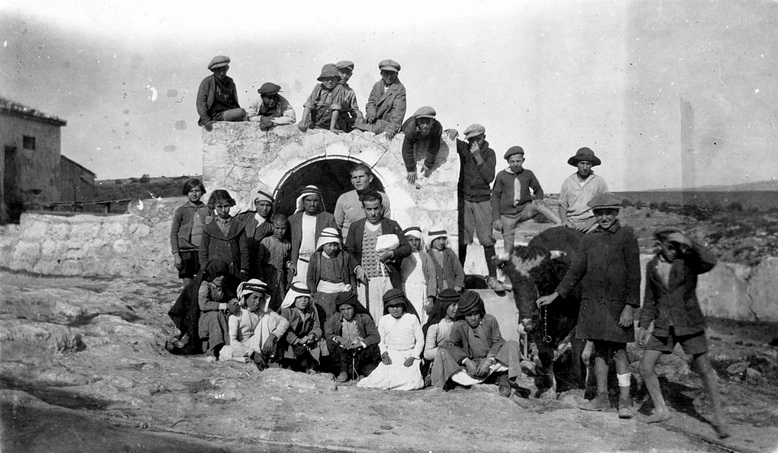
Children from Al-Sindiyana and Meir Shfeya (Jewish youth village) playing together, 1931

=== Post 1948 ===
In 1992 the village site was described: "The site is fenced in with barbed wire. Scattered piles of stones, the debris of destroyed houses, are visible among thorns, cactuses and fig, olive, and palm trees. The surrounding lands are used by Israelis as a grazing area."

== Bibliography ==
- Barron, J.B., ed. (1923). Palestine: Report and General Abstracts of the Census of 1922. Government of Palestine.
- Conder, C.R.; Kitchener, H.H. (1882). The Survey of Western Palestine: Memoirs of the Topography, Orography, Hydrography, and Archaeology. Vol. 2. London: Committee of the Palestine Exploration Fund.
- Department of Statistics (1945). Village Statistics, April, 1945. Government of Palestine.
- Guérin, V. (1875). Description Géographique Historique et Archéologique de la Palestine (in French). Vol. 2: Samarie, pt. 2. Paris: L'Imprimerie Nationale.
- Hadawi, S. (1970). Village Statistics of 1945: A Classification of Land and Area ownership in Palestine. Palestine Liberation Organization Research Center. Archived from the original on 2018-12-08.
- Khalidi, W. (1992). All That Remains: The Palestinian Villages Occupied and Depopulated by Israel in 1948. Washington D.C.: Institute for Palestine Studies. ISBN 0-88728-224-5.
- Khaṭīb, Muḥammad Kāmil; Barakat, Maher; Hartman, Michelle (2003). Just like a river. Interlink Books. ISBN 978-1-56656-475-5.
- Mills, E., ed. (1932). Census of Palestine 1931. Population of Villages, Towns and Administrative Areas. Jerusalem: Government of Palestine.
- Morris, B. (2004). The Birth of the Palestinian Refugee Problem Revisited. Cambridge University Press. ISBN 978-0-521-00967-6.
- Palmer, E.H. (1881). The Survey of Western Palestine: Arabic and English Name Lists Collected During the Survey by Lieutenants Conder and Kitchener, R. E. Transliterated and Explained by E.H. Palmer. Committee of the Palestine Exploration Fund.
- Schumacher, G. (1888). "Population list of the Liwa of Akka". Quarterly Statement - Palestine Exploration Fund. 20: 169–191.
- Velde, van de, C.W.M. (1854). Narrative of a journey through Syria and Palestine in 1851 and 1852. Vol. 1. William Blackwood and son.
