= Sabbarin =

Sabbarin صبارين Sabarin Sabbarim
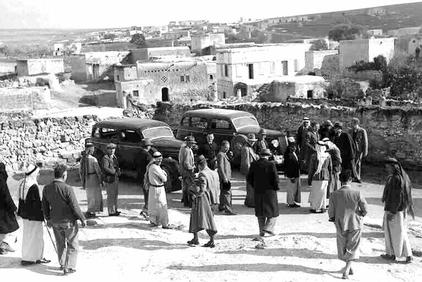
- Sabbarin, 1940
- Etymology: "rough ground"
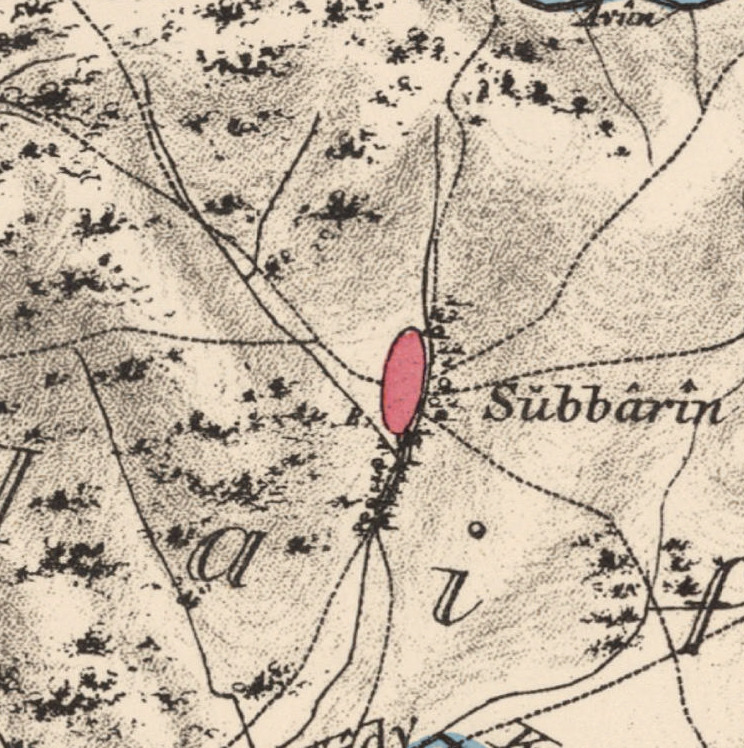
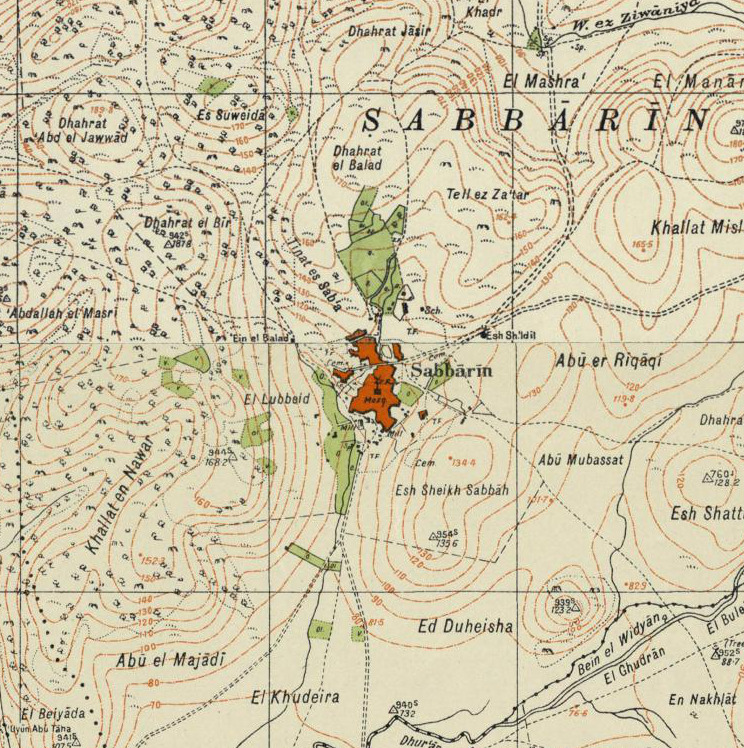
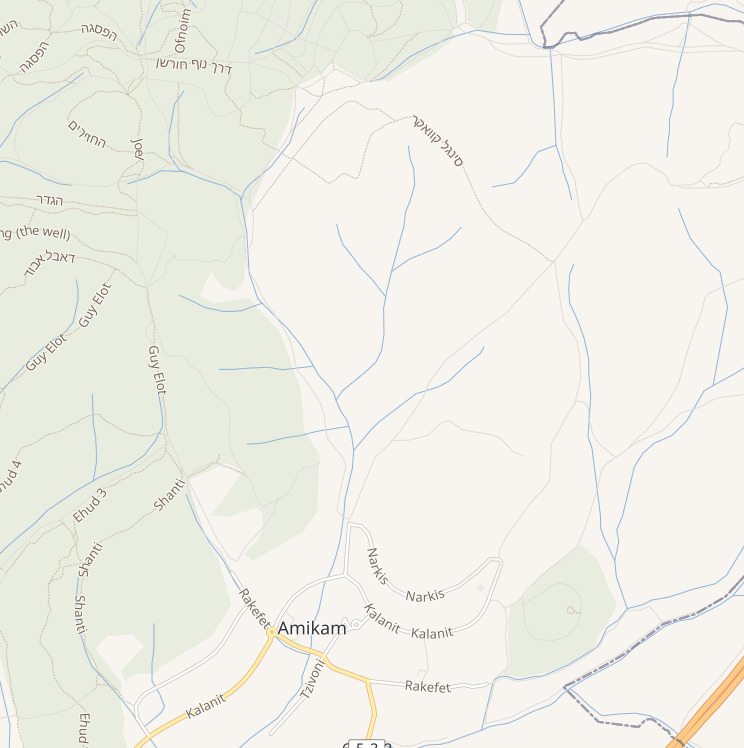
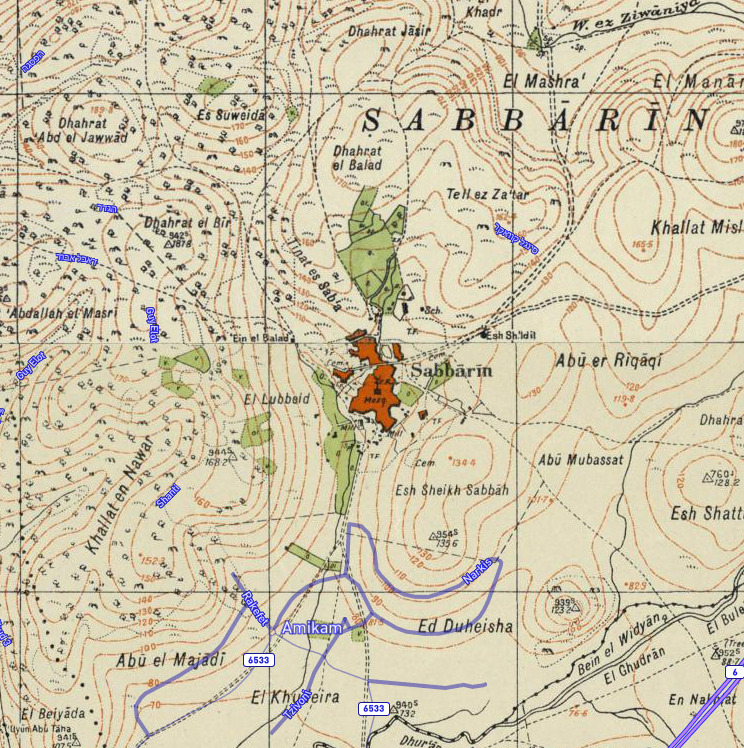
- 1870s map 1940s map modern map 1940s with modern overlay map A series of historical maps of the area around Sabbarin (click the buttons)

- Location within Mandatory Palestine
- Coordinates: 32°34′23″N 35°1′23″E
- Palestine grid: 152/219
- Geopolitical entity: Mandatory Palestine
- Subdistrict: Haifa
- Date of depopulation: 12–14 May 1948

Area
  - Total: 25,307 dunams (25.307 km^{2}; 9.771 sq mi)

Population (1945)
  - Total: 1,700
- Cause(s) of depopulation: Military assault by Yishuv forces
- Current Localities: Ramot Menashe, Amikam

Sabbarin or Subbarin (Arabic: صبارين), was a Palestinian Arab village located 28 kilometers south of Haifa. It was depopulated and destroyed during the 1948 Palestine war as part of the 1948 Palestinian expulsion and the Nakba.

== History ==
=== Late Ottoman period ===
In 1859 Subbarin had about 600 inhabitants, who cultivated 55 faddans (1 faddan =100-250 dunums) of land.

The French explorer Victor Guérin visited the village in 1870, and noted that the villagers cultivated sesame. A well, called Bir Sabbarin, appeared well built. The village had an estimated 1000 inhabitants, with homes constructed of stones or adobe.

In the 1882, the PEF's Survey of Western Palestine described Sabbarin as a "large" village, situated on a slope. The well was said to be the head of the Caesarea aqueduct. The oval well was 15 feet diameter and 15 feet deep.

A population list from about 1887 showed that Subbarin had about 1,160 inhabitants; all Muslims.

=== British Mandate period ===
In the 1922 census of Palestine, conducted by the British Mandate authorities, Sabbarin had a population of 845; 833 Muslims and 12 Christian, where the Christians were all Roman Catholics. The population had increased in the 1931 census to 1,108; 18 Christians and the rest Muslim, in a total of 256 houses.

In the 1945 statistics, the village had a population of 1,700; 1,670 Muslims and 30 Christians and the village's lands spanned 25,307 dunams. 12,773 dunums of land used for cereals; 45 dunums were irrigated or used for orchards, while 179 dunams were built-up (urban) land.

=== 1948 war and destruction ===
Sabbarin was captured by Israeli forces on May 12, 1948, during the 1947–1948 civil war in Mandatory Palestine in Operation Coastal Clearing. It was defended by a local militia and possibly the Arab Liberation Army. According to Benny Morris, the Irgun (IZL) encountered resistance there and the majority of the villagers fled after 20 of them were killed in a firefight, with an IZL armoured car firing on the villagers as they fled. More than one hundred people who had not fled, including the elderly, women, and children, were held behind barbed wire for a few days before being expelled to nearby Umm al-Fahm. (Note: Morris 2004, "At Sabbarin, where the IZL met resistance, the villagers fled after 20 died in the fire-fight; an IZL armoured car fired at the fleeing villagers. More than one hundred old people, women and children, who had stayed, were held for a few days behind barbed wire, and then expelled to Umm al Fahm, in Arab-held territory to the southeast.") Others who had fled earlier ended up in refugee camps in the Jenin area.

Historian Saleh Abdel Jawad writes that a massacre was committed by the Irgun in the village on 12-14 May. (Note: Saleh Abdel Jawad, 2007, Zionist Massacres: the Creation of the Palestinian Refugee Problem in the 1948 War. "12-14 May 1948: Sabbarin: Indiscriminate killings occur. A section of the IZL attack four villages (see Khubbeiza above). Civilians who flee are massacred after a short battle. About 20 people die. Over 100 people remain. All or a part of the elderly, women and children are forced into a house, which is blown up by troops.")

Following the war the area was incorporated into the State of Israel. Kibbutz Ramot Menashe was established northeast of the site in 1948, and Moshav Amikam was founded in 1950, 1 km south of the village site.

Khalidi described the remains of the village in 1992:

The large site, strewn with the stone debris of houses, is overgrown with wild thorns. The thorns are interspersed with cactuses and pine, fig, olive and mulberry trees. Some of the surrounding lands are used by Israelis as pasture and growing fruit trees.

Sabbarin is among the Palestinian villages for which commemorative Marches of Return have taken place, such as those organized by the Association for the Defence of the Rights of the Internally Displaced.

== Families from Sabbarin ==
From Palestineremembered.com.

1. Hamidi (Arabic: حميدي)
2. Al-Abhari (Arabic: العبهري )
3. Al-Abdallah (Arabic: ال عبدالله )
4. Al-Hajj Mahmud (Arabic: الحج محمود )
5. Al-De'emeh (Arabic: الدعمة )
6. Abu Libdi (Arabic: ابو لبده )
7. Ghnima (Arabic: غنيمه )
8. Hatab (Arabic: حطاب )
9. Al-Samada'a (Arabic: الصمادعة )
10. Abu Diab (Arabic: ابو ذياب)
11. Al Mallah (Arabic: الملاح)
12. Al-Hmedih
13. Al-Masri (Arabic: المصري)
14. Abu Kabir
15. Abu Sammen (Arabic: أبو سمن )
16. Faraj (Arabic: فرج )
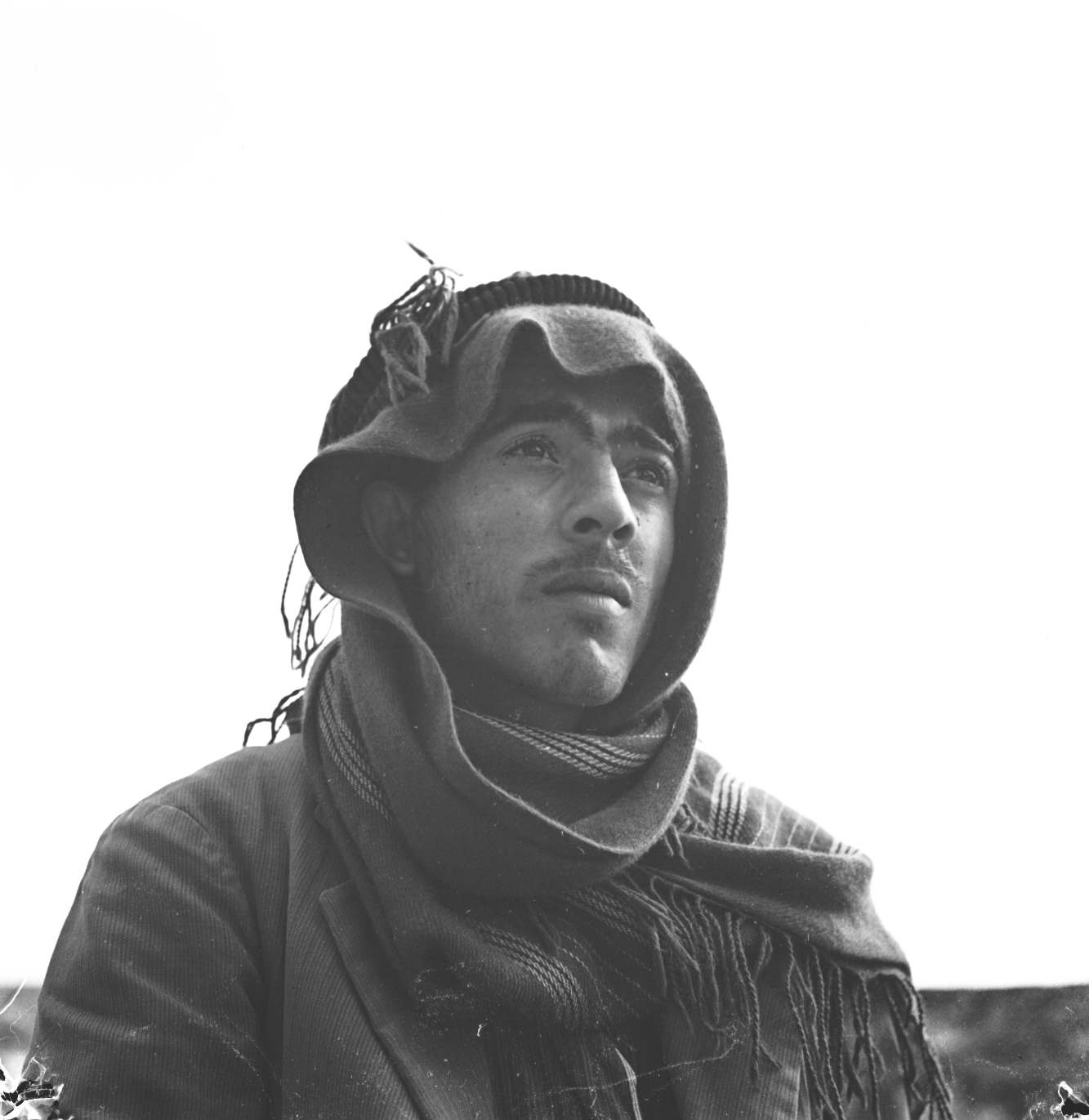
Villager of Sabbarin in 1940

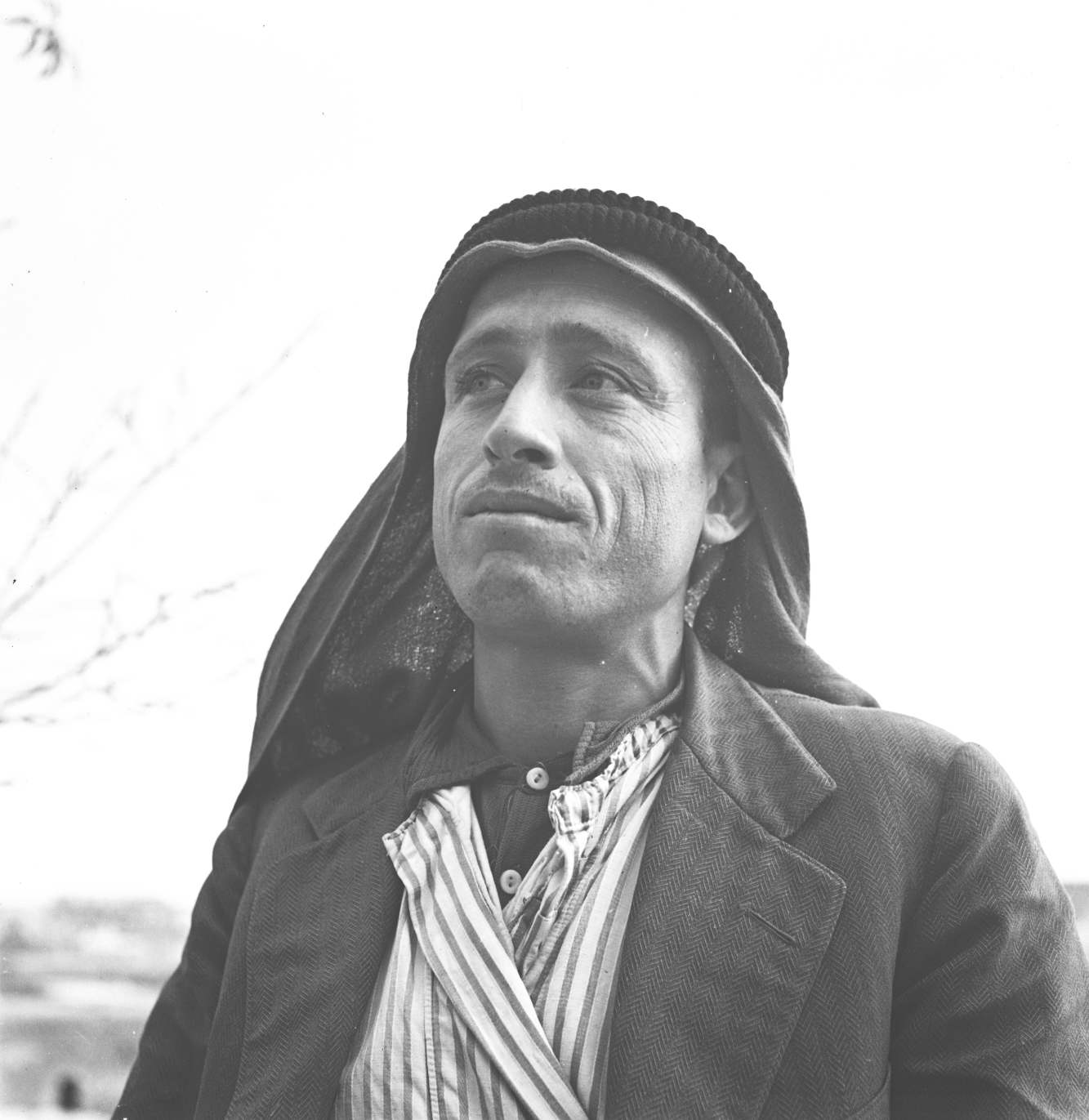
Villager of Sabbarin in 1940

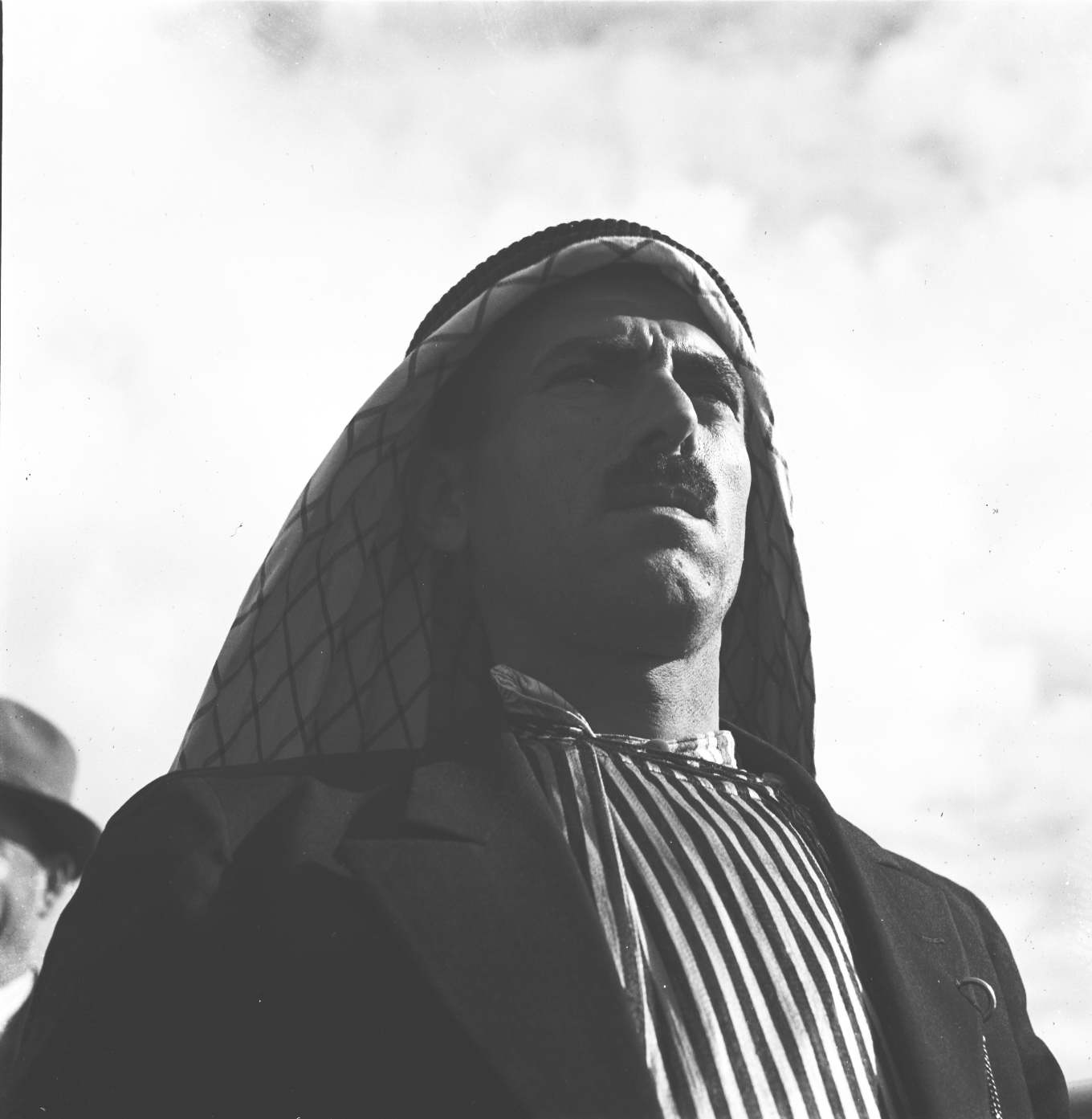
Villager of Sabbarin in 1940

== Bibliography ==
- Barron, J.B., ed. (1923). Palestine: Report and General Abstracts of the Census of 1922. Government of Palestine.
- Conder, C.R.; Kitchener, H.H. (1882). The Survey of Western Palestine: Memoirs of the Topography, Orography, Hydrography, and Archaeology. Vol. 2. London: Committee of the Palestine Exploration Fund.
- Department of Statistics (1945). Village Statistics, April, 1945. Government of Palestine.
- Guérin, V. (1875). Description Géographique Historique et Archéologique de la Palestine (in French). Vol. 2: Samarie, pt. 2. Paris: L'Imprimerie Nationale.
- Hadawi, S. (1970). Village Statistics of 1945: A Classification of Land and Area ownership in Palestine. Palestine Liberation Organization Research Center.
- Khalidi, W. (1992). All That Remains: The Palestinian Villages Occupied and Depopulated by Israel in 1948. Washington D.C.: Institute for Palestine Studies. ISBN 0-88728-224-5.
- Mills, E., ed. (1932). Census of Palestine 1931. Population of Villages, Towns and Administrative Areas. Jerusalem: Government of Palestine.
- Morris, B. (2004). The Birth of the Palestinian Refugee Problem Revisited. Cambridge University Press. ISBN 978-0-521-00967-6.
- Palmer, E.H. (1881). The Survey of Western Palestine: Arabic and English Name Lists Collected During the Survey by Lieutenants Conder and Kitchener, R. E. Transliterated and Explained by E.H. Palmer. Committee of the Palestine Exploration Fund.
- Schumacher, G. (1888). "Population list of the Liwa of Akka". Quarterly Statement - Palestine Exploration Fund. 20: 169–191.
