= Alona Regional Council =

Regional council in Israel

Coordinates: 32.529°N 34.993°E

Alona אלונה
- Regional council (from 1953)
- Interactive map of Alona
- Country: Israel
- District: Haifa
- Subdistrict: Hadera
- Natural region: Alexander Mountain, Hadera

Government
  - Head of Municipality: Aryeh Sharon

Area
  - Total: 27,070 dunams (27.07 km^{2}; 10.45 sq mi)

Population (2024)
  - Total: 2,161
  - Density: 79.83/km^{2} (206.8/sq mi)

Alona Regional Council (Hebrew: מועצה אזורית אלונה, Mo'atza Azorit Alona) is a regional council in northern Israel. It is part of Haifa District and covers three moshavim, Amikam, Aviel and Givat Nili. The council's headquarters are located in Amikam.

== History ==
The council was created for the three Mishkei Herut Beitar-affiliated moshavim due to ideological differences with other settlements, most of which were affiliated with Labor Zionism movements.

== Demographics ==
Historical population
| Year | Pop. | ±% |
|---|---|---|
| 1972 | 500 | — |
| 1983 | 700 | +40.0% |
| 1995 | 900 | +28.6% |
| 2008 | 1,700 | +88.9% |
| 2022 | 2,195 | +29.1% |
| 2024 | 2,161 | −1.5% |
