= Aviel =

Moshav in northern Israel

Aviel: אֲבִיאֵל (Hebrew); أڤيئل, السنديانة (Arabic)
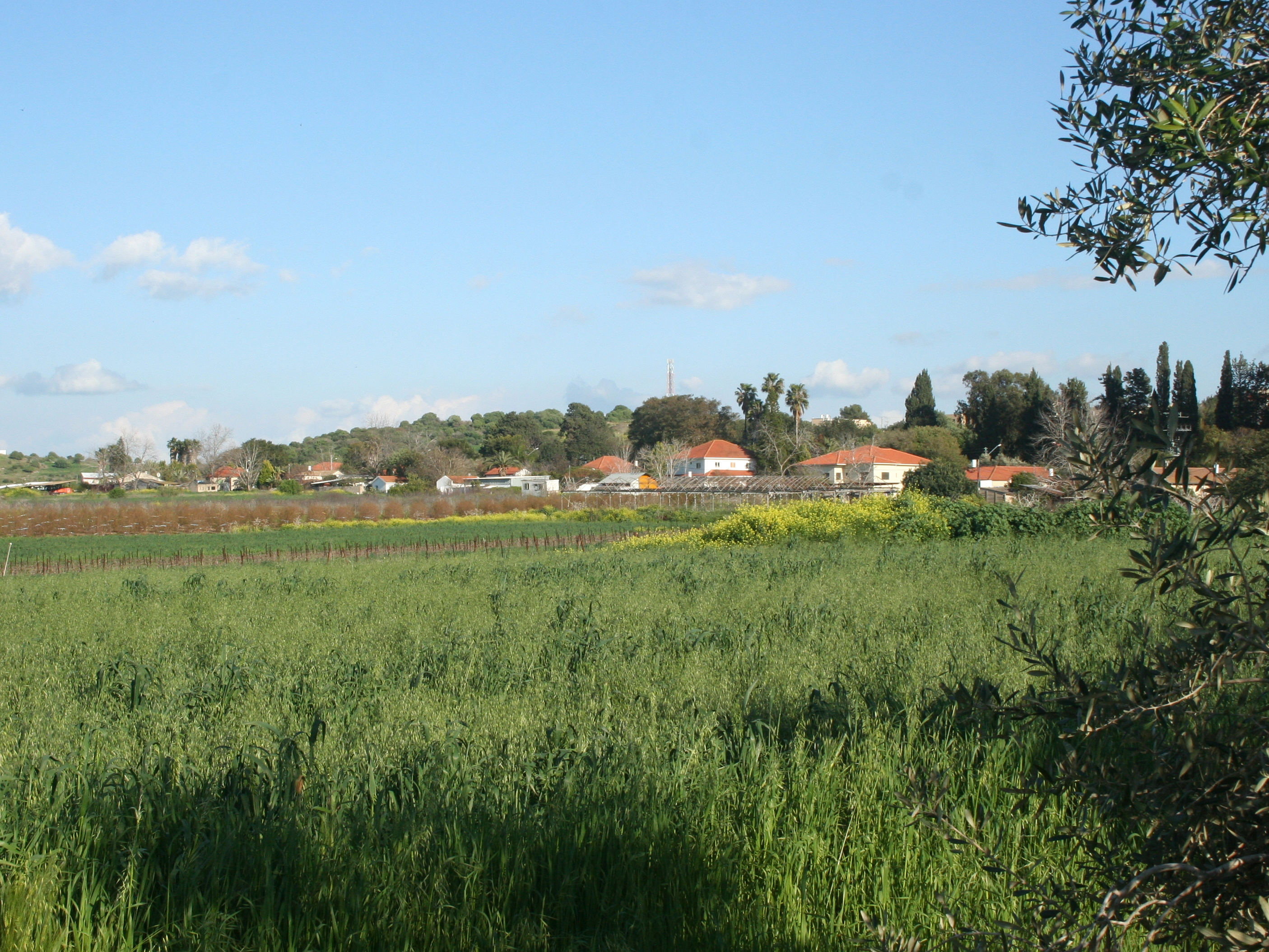

- Location within Haifa region of Israel
- Coordinates: 32°31′57″N 34°59′30″E
- Country: Israel
- District: Haifa
- Subdistrict: Hadera
- Council: Alona
- Affiliation: Mishkei Herut Beitar
- Founded: 1949
- Founder: Former Irgun Members
- Population (2024): 779

Aviel (Hebrew: אֲבִיאֵל) is a moshav in northern Israel. It is located south of Haifa within Alona Regional Council, near Zikhron Yaakov and Binyamina-Giv'at Ada. It had a population of 779 in 2024.

== History ==
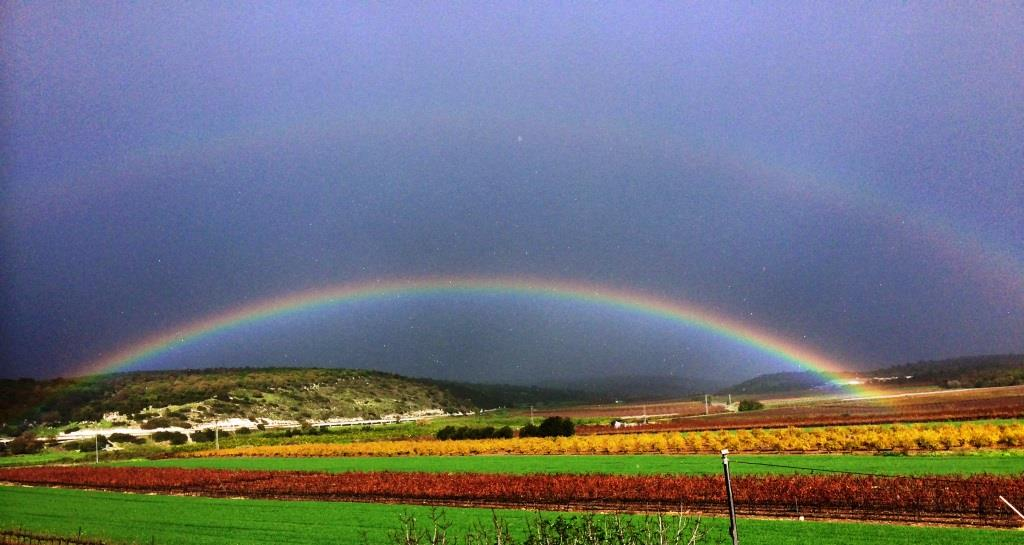
Rainbow over the fields of Moshav Aviel

The moshav was established by the Herut party in 1949 and named after Israel "Aviel" Epstein, an Irgun envoy to Rome, who was killed in Italy on 28 December 1946. Its original name was Yad HaYod-Daled, after the fourteen Irgun members who died fighting the British.

It is located on land near the depopulated Palestinian village of Al-Sindiyana, southwest of the village site.

== Election Results ==
About 80% of Aviel's eligible voters voted in the 2026 Israeli legislative elections, compared with a 78% national voter turnout. Yashar received about 37% of Aviel's votes, followed by The Democrats with 21% and Together with 13%.
