= Geva Carmel =

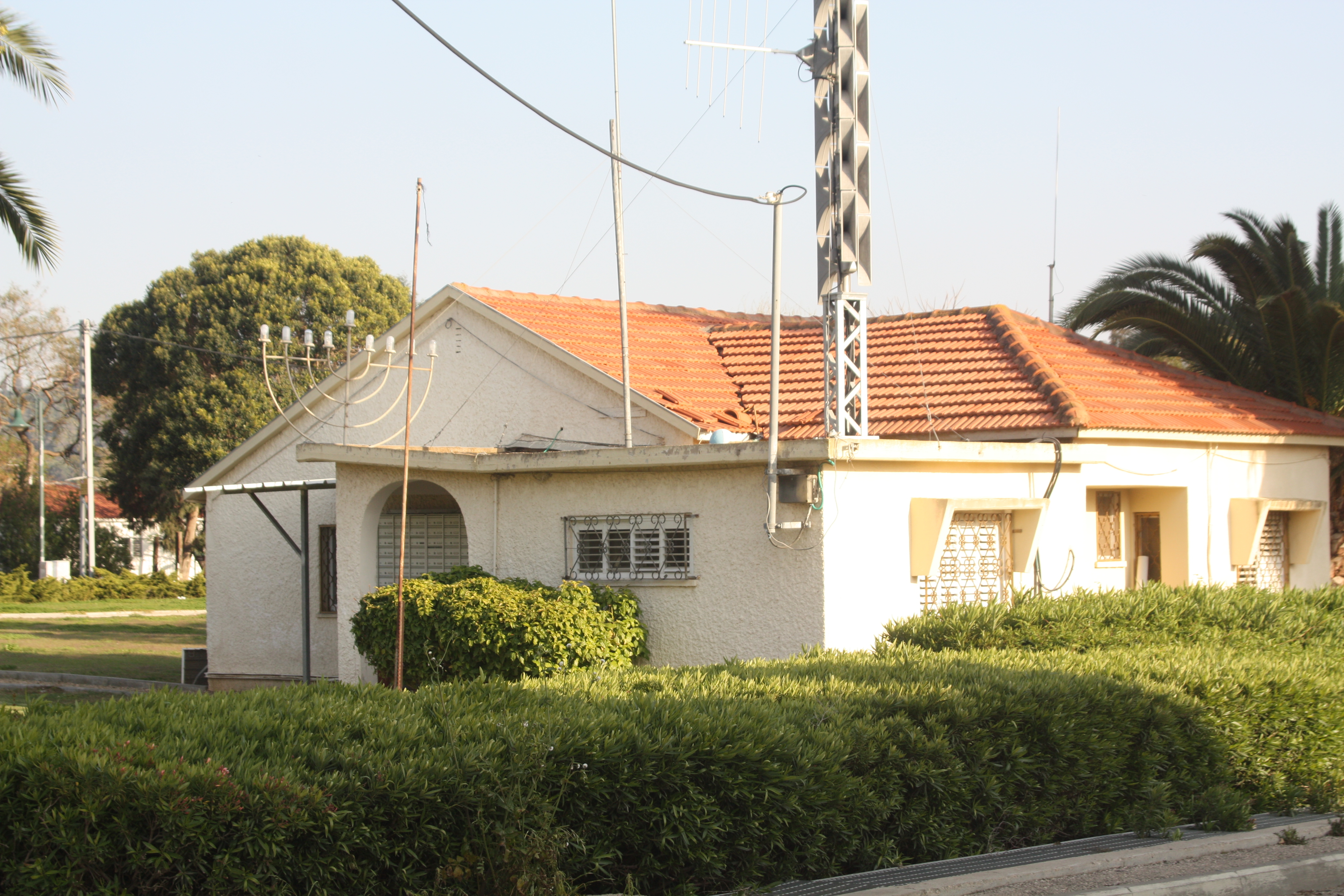

- Location within Haifa region of Israel
- Coordinates: 32°39′43″N 34°57′16″E
- Country: Israel
- District: Haifa
- Subdistrict: Hadera
- Council: Hof HaCarmel
- Affiliation: Moshavim Movement
- Founded: 1949
- Founder: Tunisian and Turkish Jews
- Population (2024): 1,179

Geva Carmel (Hebrew: גֶּבַע כַּרְמֶל, lit. 'Carmel Hill') is a moshav in northern Israel. Located near Atlit, it falls under the jurisdiction of Hof HaCarmel Regional Council. In 2024 it had a population of 1,179.

== Etymology ==
The moshav takes its name from the Hellenistic Jewish city of Geba, which according to Josephus was situated in a large plain near Galilee and Mount Carmel. It is also mentioned in Pliny the Elder's Natural History.

== History ==
Geva Carmel was established in 1949 by immigrants from Tunisia and Turkey, including Moshe Sardines, who later served as a member of the Knesset for Mapai. According to Walid Khalidi, it was built east of the former village of al-Sarafand, while according to Benny Morris, it was named for and built on land near the depopulated Palestinian village of Jaba', about 1/2 km northwest of the village site.

== See also ==
- Nahal Me'arot Nature Reserve
