= Umm ash Shauf =

Umm al-Shawf أُم الشوف Umm al Shauf
- Village
- Etymology: The place with the harrow
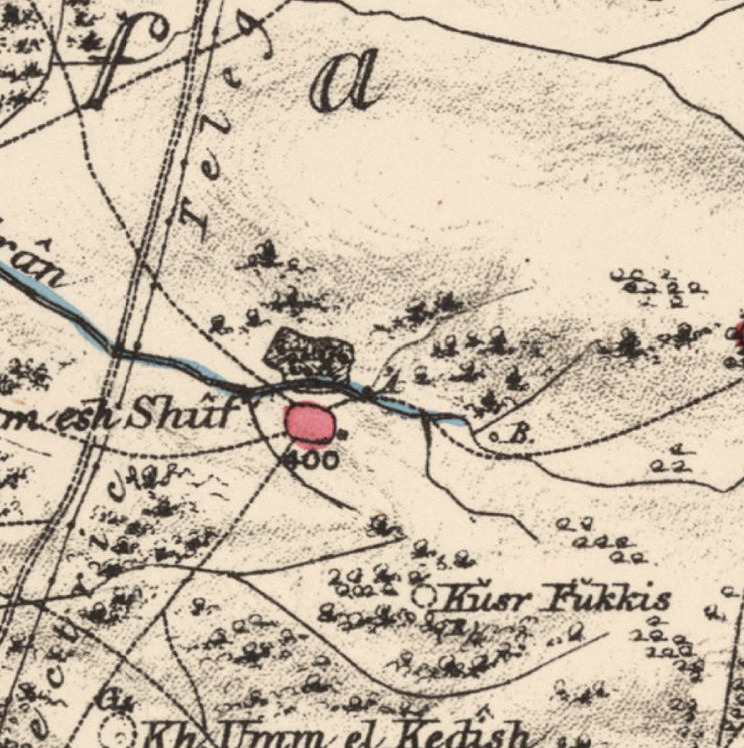
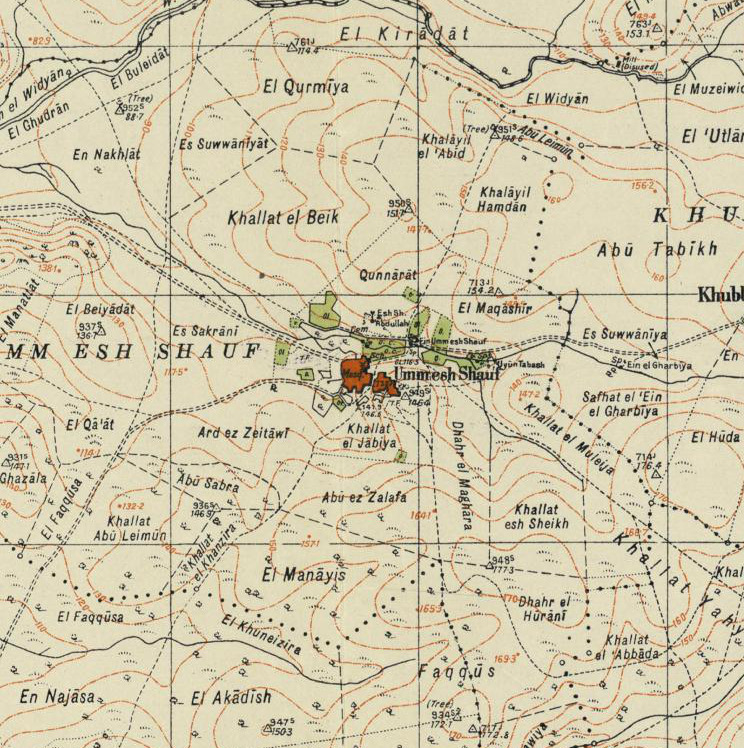
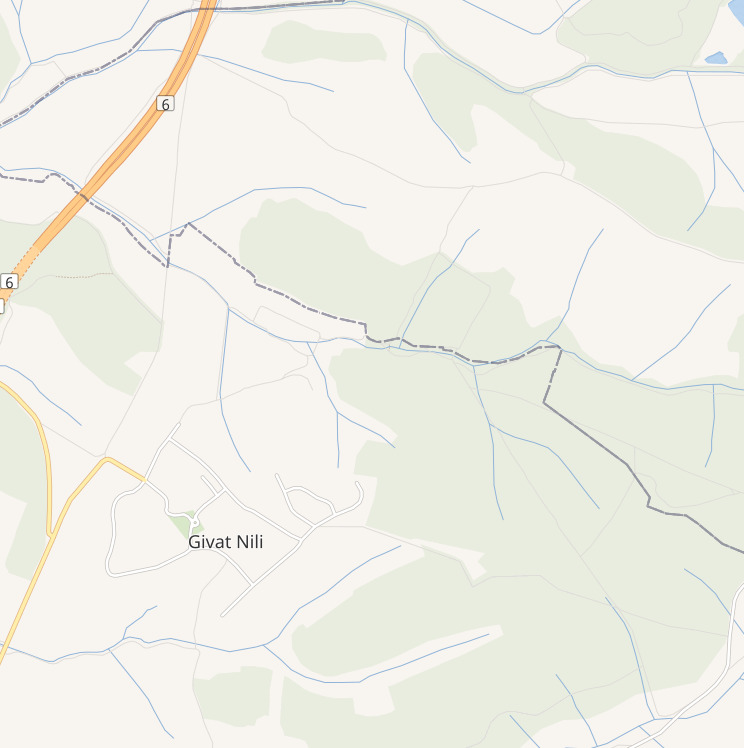
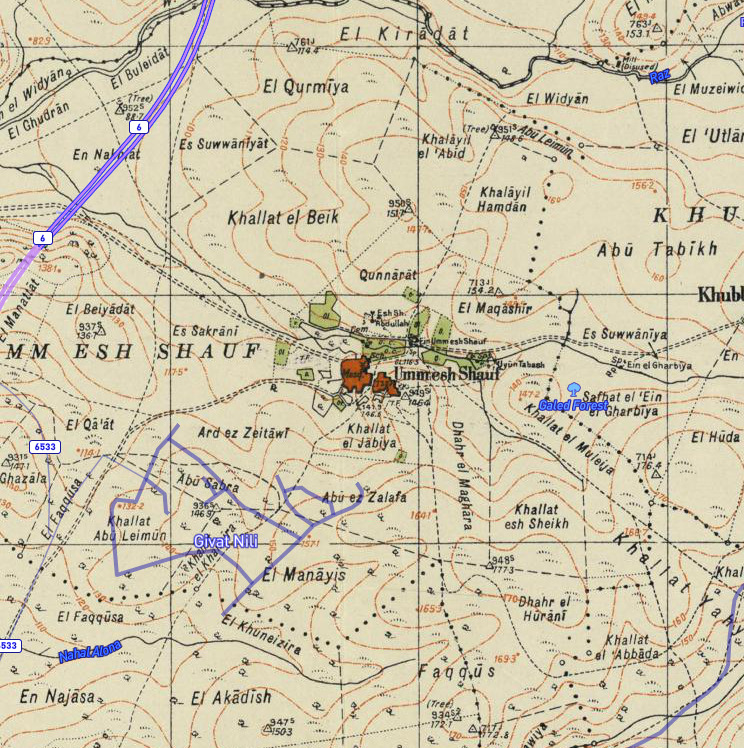
- 1870s map 1940s map modern map 1940s with modern overlay map A series of historical maps of the area around Umm ash Shauf (click the buttons)

- Location within Mandatory Palestine
- Coordinates: 32°33′12″N 35°02′55″E
- Palestine grid: 154/217
- Geopolitical entity: Mandatory Palestine
- Subdistrict: Haifa
- Date of depopulation: May 12–14, 1948

Area
  - Total: 7,426 dunams (7.426 km^{2}; 2.867 sq mi)

Population (1945)
  - Total: 480
- Cause(s) of depopulation: Military assault by Yishuv forces
- Current Localities: Givat Nili

Umm al-Shawf or Umm ash Shauf (Arabic: أُم الشوف, Umm esh Shauf) was a Palestinian Arab village located 29.5 km south of Haifa, on the sloping section of Wadi al-Marah. It was depopulated as a result of a military assault between May 12–14, just before the outbreak of the 1948 Arab-Israeli war.

== History ==
In 1859 the population was 150, and the cultivation was 21 feddans.

In 1882, the PEF's Survey of Western Palestine described Umm ash Shuf as: "a small village well supplied with water from two springs on the north, on which side is a little garden."

A population list from about 1887 showed that Umm esh Shuf had about 375 inhabitants, all Muslim.

=== British Mandate era ===
In the 1922 census of Palestine, conducted by the British Mandate authorities, Umm al-Shuf had a population of 252 Muslims, increasing in the 1931 census to 353 Muslims, in a total of 73 houses.

In 1945, it had a population of 480 Muslim inhabitants, with 7,426 dunams of land. Of this, 107 dunums of land were for plantations and irrigable land, 6,175 for cereals, while 31 dunams were classified as built-up land.

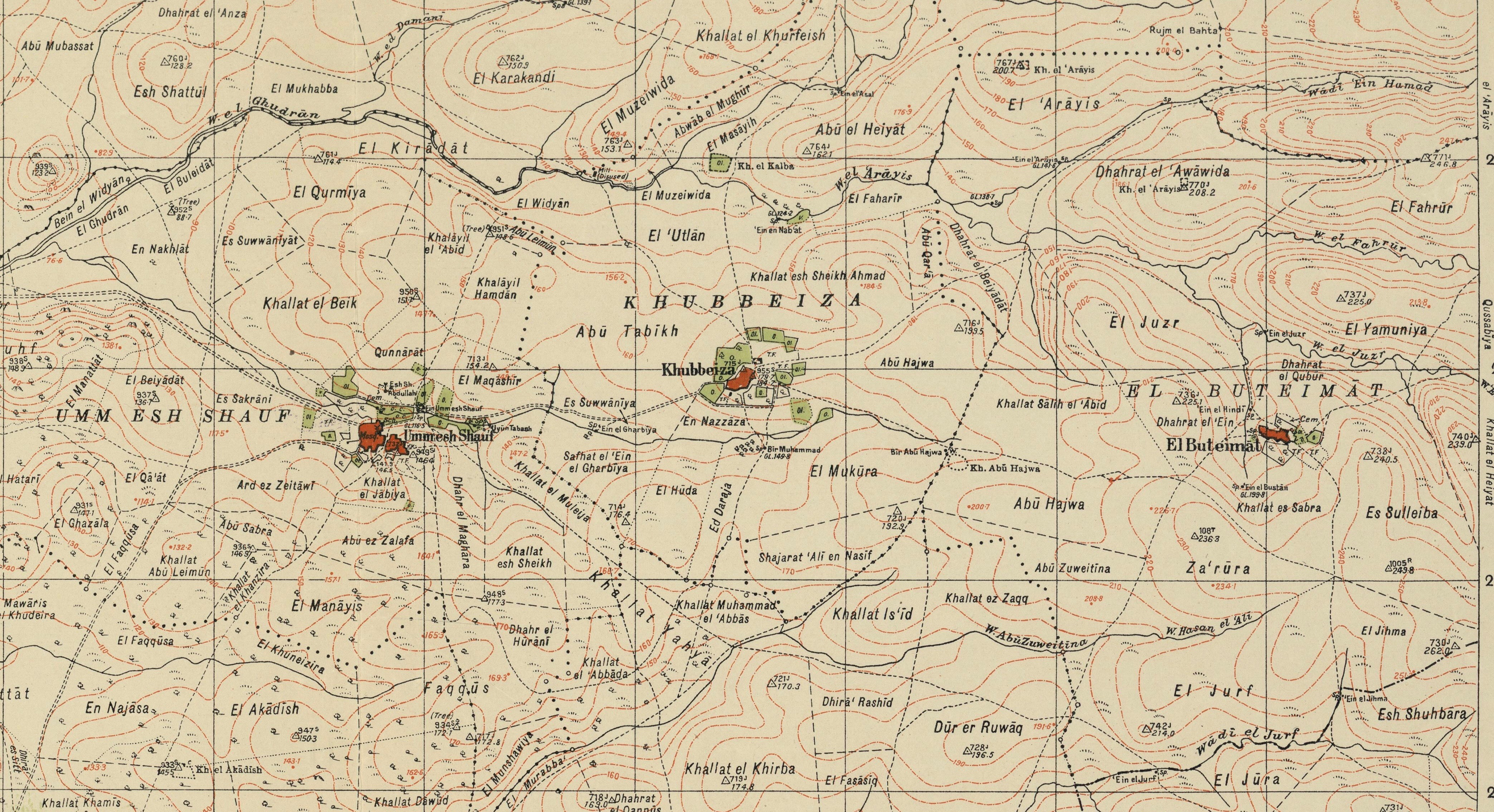
Umm ash Shauf 1942 1:20,000

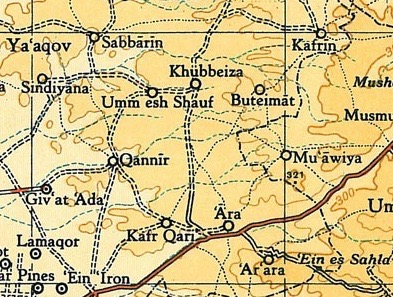
Umm ash Shauf 1945 1:250,000

=== 1948 and aftermath ===
Umm ash Shauf became depopulated after an assault from IZL troops in early May, 1948.

IZL troops searched some refugees from Umm ash Shauf, and found one pistol and one rifle. They took seven young men from the refugees aside, and when none of them admitted to owning the weapons, they were all executed.

Following the war the area was incorporated into the State of Israel and the moshav of Givat Nili was founded in 1953 on the village's land, south of the village site.

In 1992 the village site was described: "Piles of stone debris from the houses are scattered about the site, which is overgrown with cactuses, thorns, and bushes. The shrine of Shaykh 'Abd Allah still stands."

== Bibliography ==
- Barron, J.B., ed. (1923). Palestine: Report and General Abstracts of the Census of 1922. Government of Palestine.
- Conder, C.R.; Kitchener, H.H. (1882). The Survey of Western Palestine: Memoirs of the Topography, Orography, Hydrography, and Archaeology. Vol. 2. London: Committee of the Palestine Exploration Fund.
- Department of Statistics (1945). Village Statistics, April, 1945. Government of Palestine.
- Hadawi, S. (1970). Village Statistics of 1945: A Classification of Land and Area ownership in Palestine. Palestine Liberation Organization Research Center.
- Khalidi, W. (1992). All That Remains: The Palestinian Villages Occupied and Depopulated by Israel in 1948. Washington D.C.: Institute for Palestine Studies. ISBN 0-88728-224-5.
- Mills, E., ed. (1932). Census of Palestine 1931. Population of Villages, Towns and Administrative Areas. Jerusalem: Government of Palestine.
- Morris, B. (2004). The Birth of the Palestinian Refugee Problem Revisited. Cambridge University Press. ISBN 978-0-521-00967-6.
- Palmer, E.H. (1881). The Survey of Western Palestine: Arabic and English Name Lists Collected During the Survey by Lieutenants Conder and Kitchener, R. E. Transliterated and Explained by E.H. Palmer. Committee of the Palestine Exploration Fund.
- Schumacher, G. (1888). "Population list of the Liwa of Akka". Quarterly Statement - Palestine Exploration Fund. 20: 169–191.
