= Moshe Bar Siman Tov =

Israeli economist and health official

- משה בר סימן טוב
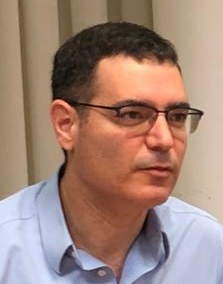
- Bar Siman Tov in January 2020

Director-General of the Ministry of Health
- Incumbent
- Assumed office 2015

Personal details
- Education: Hebrew University of Jerusalem

Moshe Bar Siman Tov (Hebrew: משה בר סימן טוב) is an Israeli economist and the Director-General of the Ministry of Health. In November 2026, he announced that he intends to step down from his position as Director-General in the next few weeks.

== Early life ==
Moshe Bar Siman Tov was born on 21 October 1976, in Yehud, Israel to a family of Turkish descent.

== Ministry of Health ==
=== First term ===
Bar Siman Tov was appointed Director-General of the Ministry of Health in 2015 and was the first non-doctor to hold the position.

=== Second term ===
Bar Siman Tov's order to evacuate Soroka Medical Center during the Twelve-Day War was credited with saving several lives. In November 2026, he announced that he intends to step down from his position as Director-General in the next few weeks.
