= Burgata =

Moshav in central Israel

Burgata: בורגתה, בּוּרְגְתָא (Hebrew); بورجتا (Arabic)
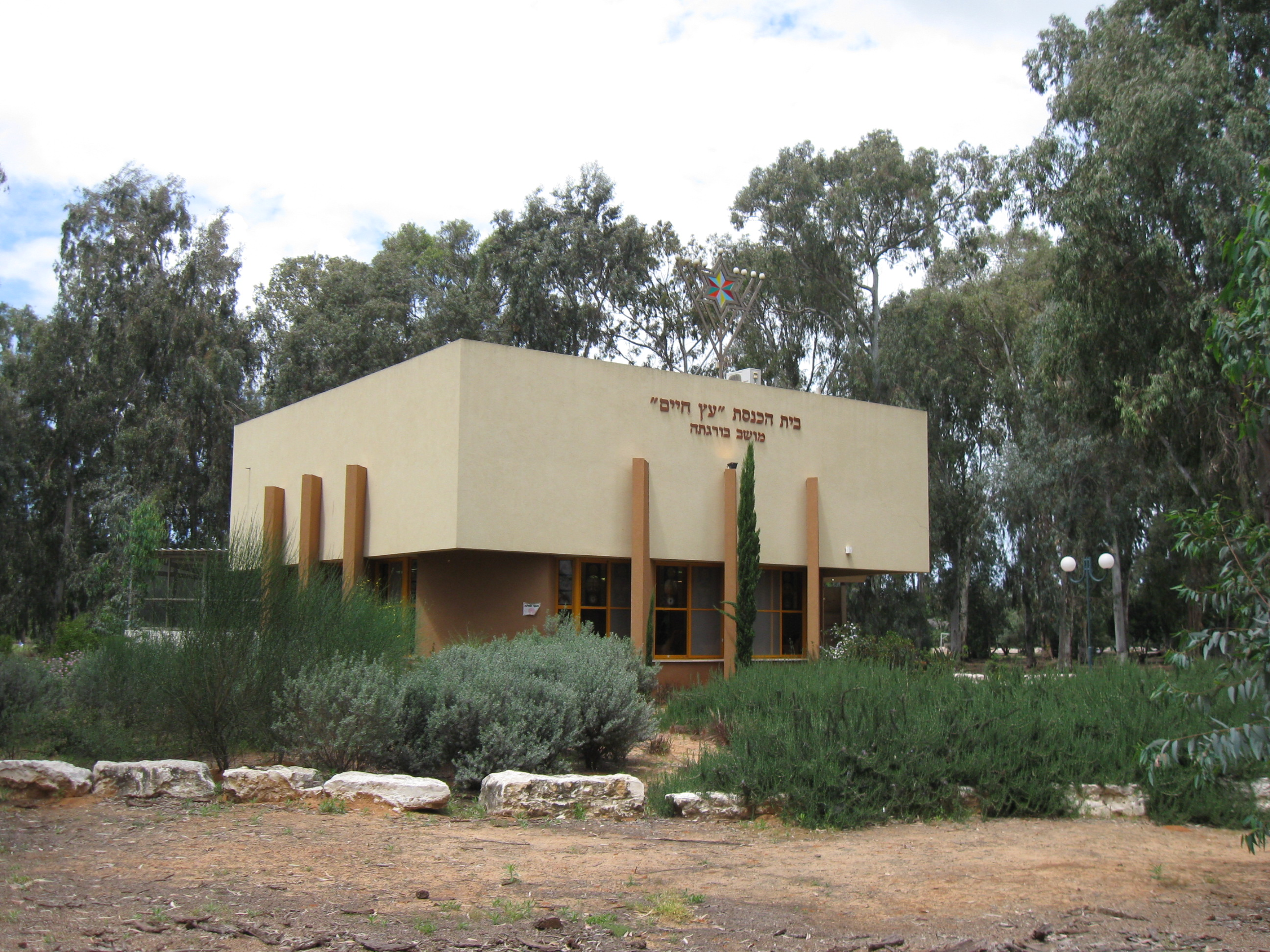

- Location within Central Israel
- Coordinates: 32°19′36″N 34°57′44″E
- Country: Israel
- District: Central
- Subdistrict: HaSharon
- Council: Hefer Valley
- Affiliation: Moshavim Movement
- Founded: 1949
- Founder: Moroccan and Turkish Jews
- Population (2024): 1,130

Burgata (Hebrew: בורגתה, בּוּרְגְתָא), also Burgeta, is a moshav in central Israel. Located in the Sharon plain on Highway 57 between Netanya and Tulkarm, it falls under the jurisdiction of Hefer Valley Regional Council. In 2024 it had a population of 1,130.

== History ==
=== Crusader period ===
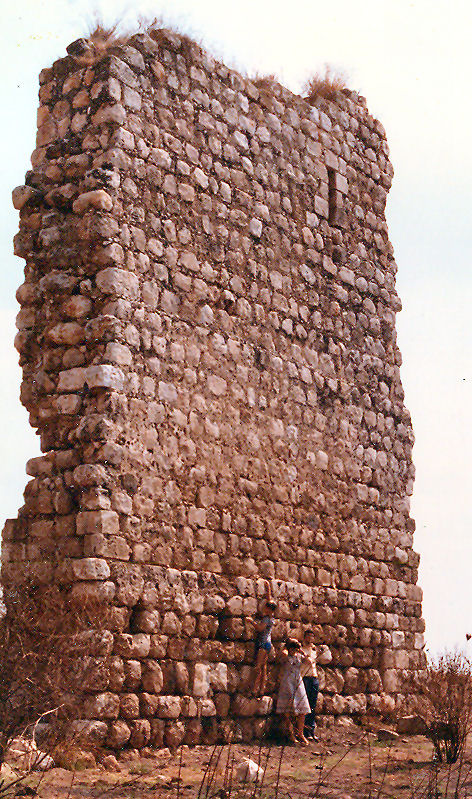
Ruins of Burj al-'Atut, the Crusaders' Turris Rubea, on the outskirts of Burgata

The date of the construction of the fort is unknown. Until 1189, it was property of the Knights Templar. The "Maria Latin" convent, erected on the site, was acquired by the Knights Hospitallers in 1248.

=== Moshav Burgata ===
The modern moshav was founded in 1949 by immigrants from Morocco and Turkey, and was named after the town of Burgata from the Amoraim era. Like many moshavim in Israel, the original homesteads now have given way to new neighbourhoods on the "b" lands, formally known as "Habanim", or in English, the lands belonging to the children. Originally these lands were cultivated mostly but it was forbidden to build on them. Since the regulations were relaxed, many of the "moshavniks" began building villas on the extended acreage in order to compensate for lost revenues in the ever depressing agricultural sector. Whole new neighbourhoods have sprung up in many moshavim, sometimes with better municipal services then the original homesteads, due to newer building codes.
