= Khirbat Bayt Far =

Khirbat Bayt Far خربة بيت فار
- Village
- Etymology: the ruin of the house of the mouse
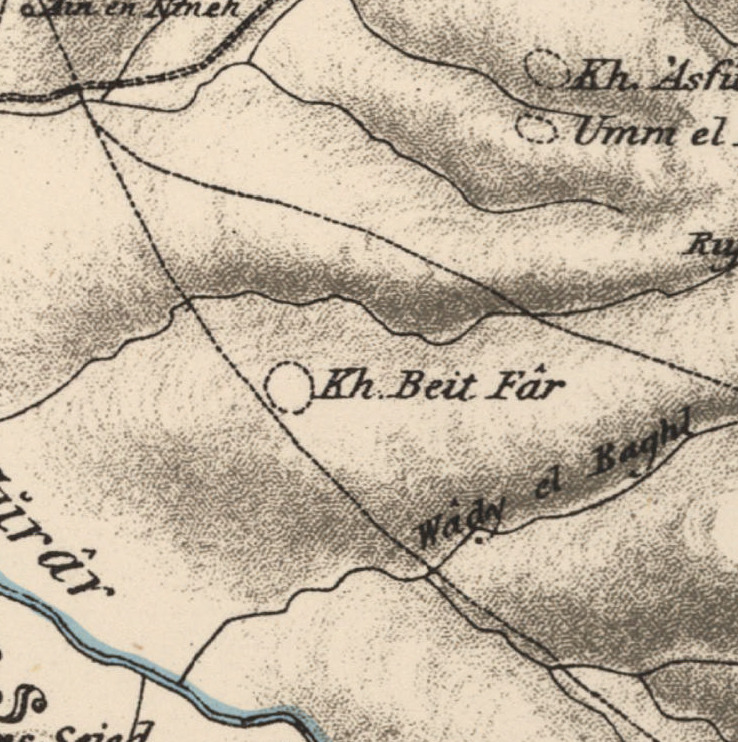
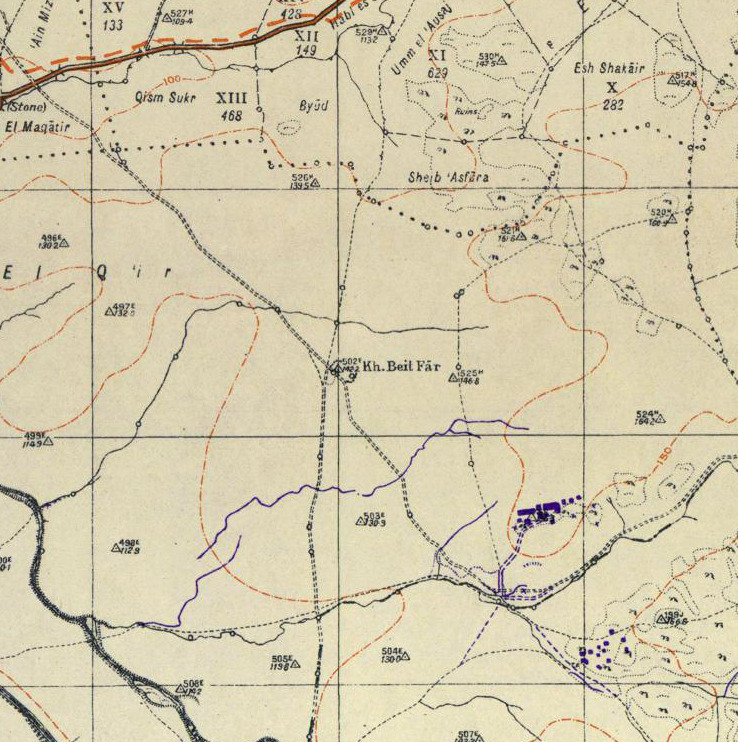
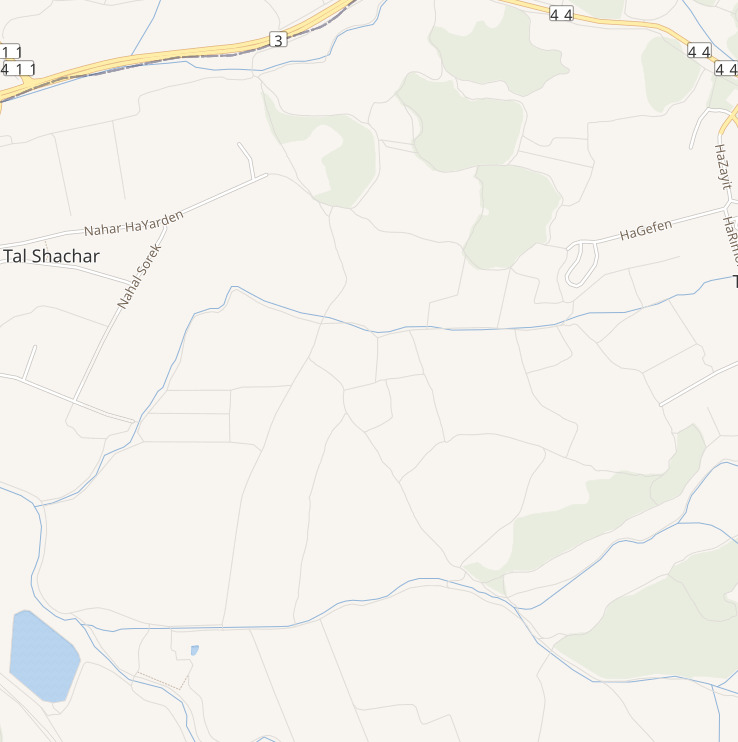
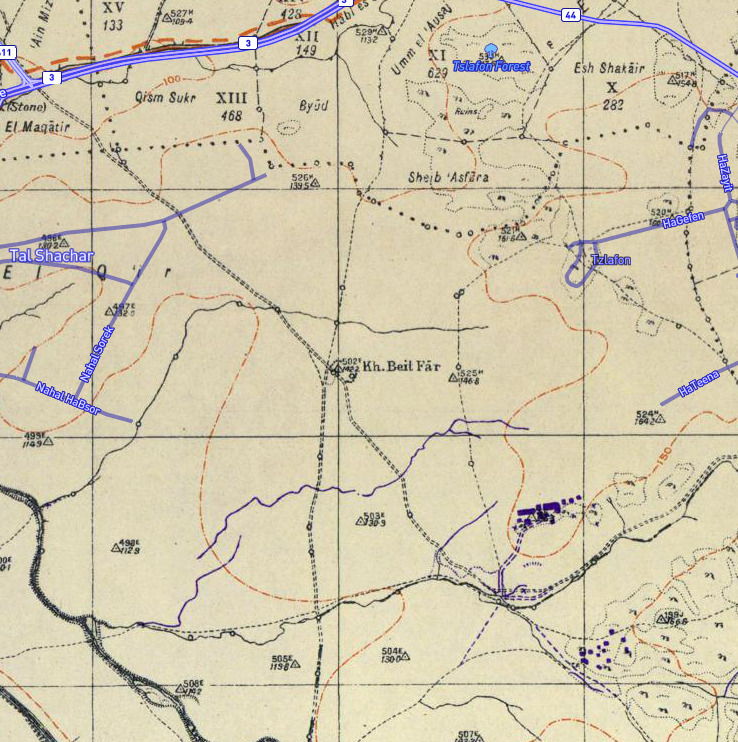
- 1870s map 1940s map modern map 1940s with modern overlay map A series of historical maps of the area around Khirbat Bayt Far (click the buttons)

- Location within Mandatory Palestine
- Coordinates: 31°48′03″N 34°54′57″E
- Palestine grid: 142/134
- Geopolitical entity: Mandatory Palestine
- Subdistrict: Ramle
- Date of depopulation: April 7, 1948

Population (1945)
  - Total: 300
- Current Localities: Tal Shahar

Khirbat Bayt Far was a Palestinian village in the Ramle Subdistrict of Mandatory Palestine, located 14 km south of Ramla. It was depopulated during the 1947–48 Civil War in Mandatory Palestine on April 7, 1948.

== History ==
Ceramics from the Byzantine era have been found here.

=== Ottoman era ===
In 1838, in the late Ottoman era, it was noted as a village in ruins.

In 1863 Victor Guérin noted "important ruins" here. "There once stood a hamlet, the ruins of which are scattered over a feeble mound amid the bushes and tall grass."

In 1882, the PEF's Survey of Western Palestine (SWP) found here: "Walls and foundations, apparently modern, with caves and a spring."

=== British Mandate era ===
In the 1922 census of Palestine conducted by the British Mandate authorities, Bait Far had a population of 28 Muslims, decreasing in the 1931 census to 26 Muslims, in a total of 11 houses.

In the 1945 statistics the village had a population of 300 Muslims with a total of 5,604 dunums of land. Of this, 19 dunums were for plantations and irrigable land, 5,337 dunums were for cereals, while a total of 248 dunams were classified as non-cultivable areas.

=== 1948, aftermath ===
On 11 January 1948, Kfar Uriah was attacked by Arabs who came from neighboring Beit Jiz and Khirbet Beit Far.

In 1948, Beyt Pe'er was founded on village land, it later changed its name into Tal Shahar.

In 1992 the village site was described: "All that is left of the village are debris and girders heaped together in a small area. The site is ringed by carob trees. The remains of an uprooted olive grove lies to the north and east."

== Bibliography ==
- Barron, J. B., ed. (1923). Palestine: Report and General Abstracts of the Census of 1922. Government of Palestine.
- Conder, C.R.; Kitchener, H.H. (1882). The Survey of Western Palestine: Memoirs of the Topography, Orography, Hydrography, and Archaeology. Vol. 2. London: Committee of the Palestine Exploration Fund.
- Dauphin, C. (1998). La Palestine byzantine, Peuplement et Populations. BAR International Series 726 (in French). Vol. III : Catalogue. Oxford: Archeopress. ISBN 0-860549-05-4.
- Department of Statistics (1945). Village Statistics, April, 1945. Government of Palestine.
- Guérin, V. (1869). Description Géographique Historique et Archéologique de la Palestine (in French). Vol. 1: Judee, pt. 2. Paris: L'Imprimerie Nationale.
- Hadawi, S. (1970). Village Statistics of 1945: A Classification of Land and Area ownership in Palestine. Palestine Liberation Organization Research Center. Archived from the original on 2018-12-08.
- Khalidi, W. (1992). All That Remains:The Palestinian Villages Occupied and Depopulated by Israel in 1948. Washington D.C.: Institute for Palestine Studies. ISBN 0-88728-224-5.
- Mills, E., ed. (1932). Census of Palestine 1931. Population of Villages, Towns and Administrative Areas. Jerusalem: Government of Palestine.
- Morris, B. (2004). The Birth of the Palestinian Refugee Problem Revisited. Cambridge University Press. ISBN 978-0-521-00967-6. (p. 376)
- Morris, B. (2008). 1948: a history of the first Arab-Israeli war. Yale University Press. ISBN 9780300126969.
- Palmer, E.H. (1881). The Survey of Western Palestine: Arabic and English Name Lists Collected During the Survey by Lieutenants Conder and Kitchener, R. E. Transliterated and Explained by E.H. Palmer. Committee of the Palestine Exploration Fund.
- Robinson, E.; Smith, E. (1841). Biblical Researches in Palestine, Mount Sinai and Arabia Petraea: A Journal of Travels in the year 1838. Vol. 3. Boston: Crocker & Brewster.
