= Amikam =

Amikam: עַמִּיקָם (Hebrew)

Hebrew transcription(s)
  - Official: Ammiqam
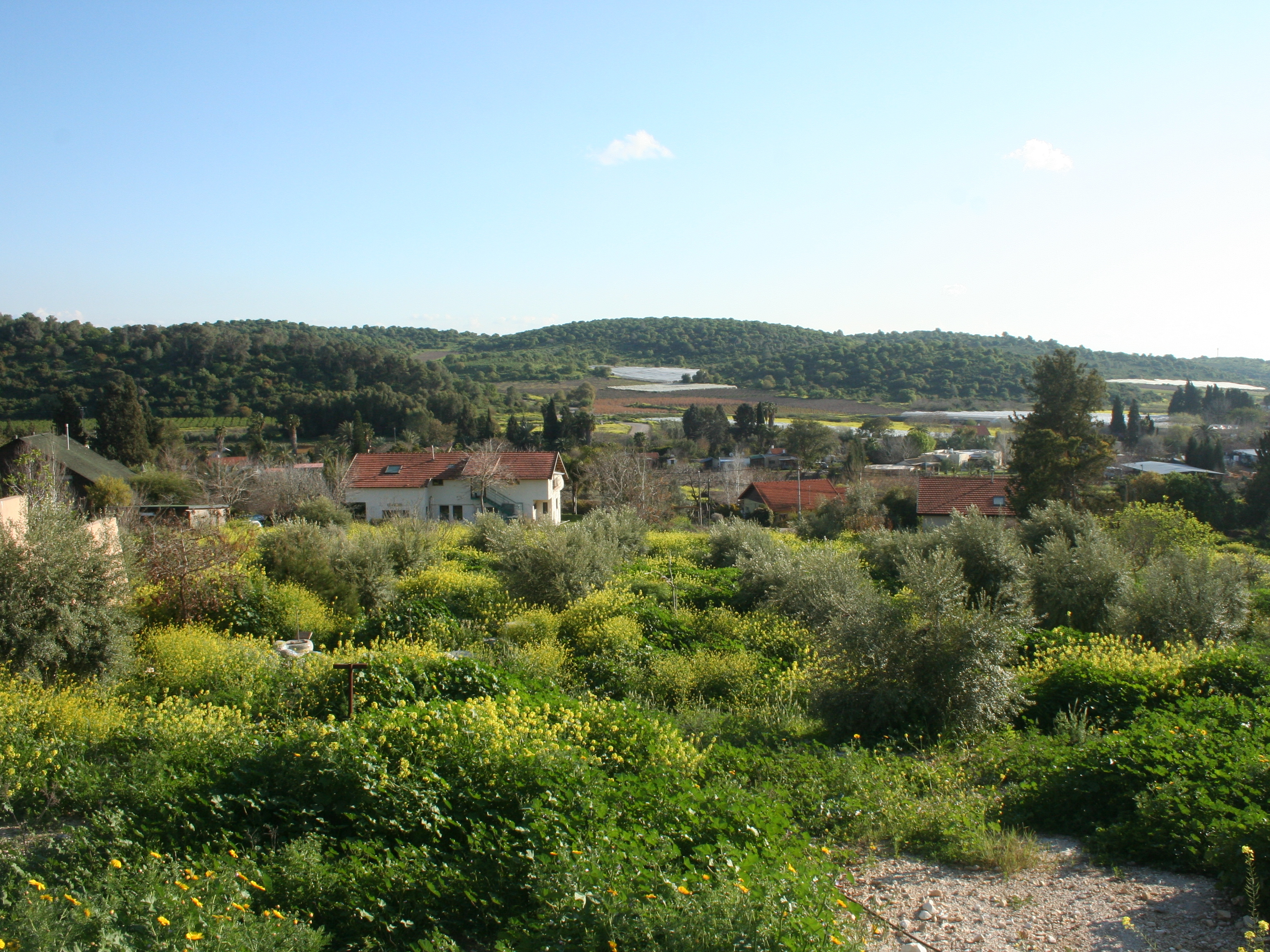

- Location within Haifa region of Israel Location within Israel
- Coordinates: 32°33′49″N 35°1′15″E
- Country: Israel
- District: Haifa
- Subdistrict: Hadera
- Council: Alona
- Affiliation: Mishkei Herut Beitar
- Founded: 1950
- Founder: Immigrants from China
- Population (2024): 751

Amikam (Hebrew: עַמִּיקָם) is a moshav in northern Israel. Located near Zikhron Ya'akov, it falls under the jurisdiction of Alona Regional Council, whose headquarters are located in the moshav. In 2024, it had a population of 751. West of the moshav is the Alona Park with the archaeological site Mey Kedem near the coastal city of Caesarea.

== History ==
The moshav was established in 1950 by Jewish refugees from Harbin, Manchuria and Shanghai, China, who had fled the Chinese Civil War. The land was part of the village lands of the depopulated Palestinian village of Sabbarin before 1948.

The founders were later joined by Jews from the Cyprus concentration camps, and followed by Yemenite Jews. In 1956, a group of Polish Jewish immigrants settled on the moshav. Some of the families engage in fruit farming, raising peaches, plums, nectarines and loquats.

Children attend the local Tali Alona elementary school.

== Agriculture ==
A rare variety of peach was grown on Moshav Amikam and named for the moshav. Pits from this variety were found on Masada. Now the one remaining tree is in Kfar Kara.

== Notable residents ==
- Yoav Gallant (born 1958), Israeli Minister of Defense and former army general
