= Givat Nili =

Moshav in northern Israel

Givat Nili: גִּבְעַת נִילִ״י (Hebrew)
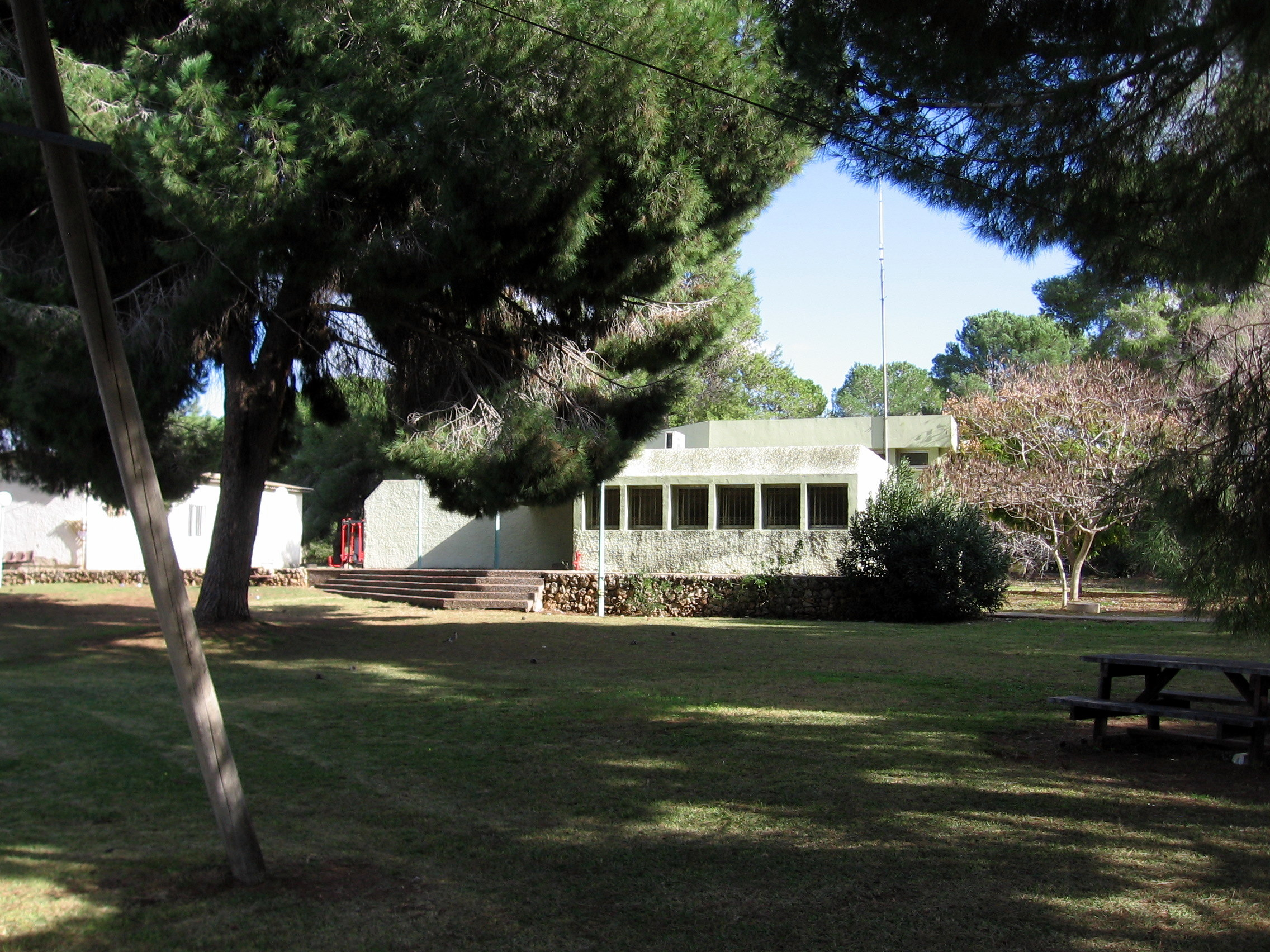

- Location within Haifa region of Israel
- Coordinates: 32°32′49″N 35°2′28″E
- Country: Israel
- District: Haifa
- Subdistrict: Hadera
- Council: Alona Regional Council
- Affiliation: Mishkei Herut Beitar
- Founded: 1953
- Founder: Iraqi, Turkish and Tunisian immigrants
- Population (2024): 631

Givat Nili (Hebrew: גִּבְעַת נִילִ״י, lit. 'Nili Hill') is a moshav in northern Israel. Located near Zikhron Ya'akov and Wadi Ara, it falls under the jurisdiction of Alona Regional Council. In 2024 it had a population of 631.

== History ==
The moshav was established in 1953 by Jewish immigrants from Iraq, Turkey and Tunisia on land near the depopulated Palestinian village of Umm ash Shauf. It was named after the Nili underground organisation.

== See also ==
- Israeli wine
