= Tal Shahar =

Village in central Israel

Tal Shahar: טל שחר (Hebrew)
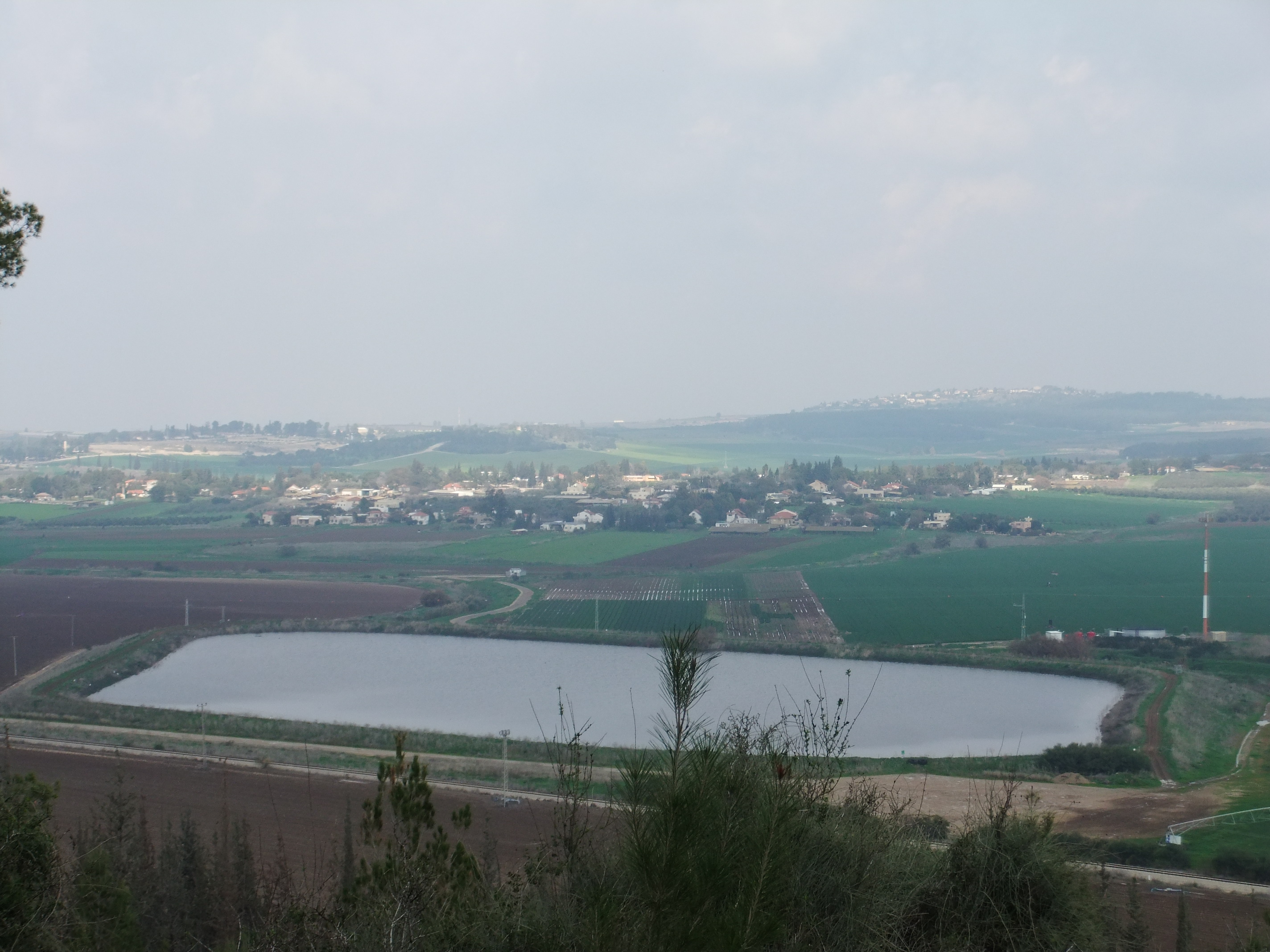

- Location within Jerusalem District
- Coordinates: 31°48′22″N 34°54′13″E
- Country: Israel
- District: Jerusalem
- Council: Mateh Yehuda
- Affiliation: Moshavim Movement
- Founded: 1948
- Founder: Greek, Polish and Turkish Jews
- Population (2024): 1,321
- Website: www.tal-shahar.org.il

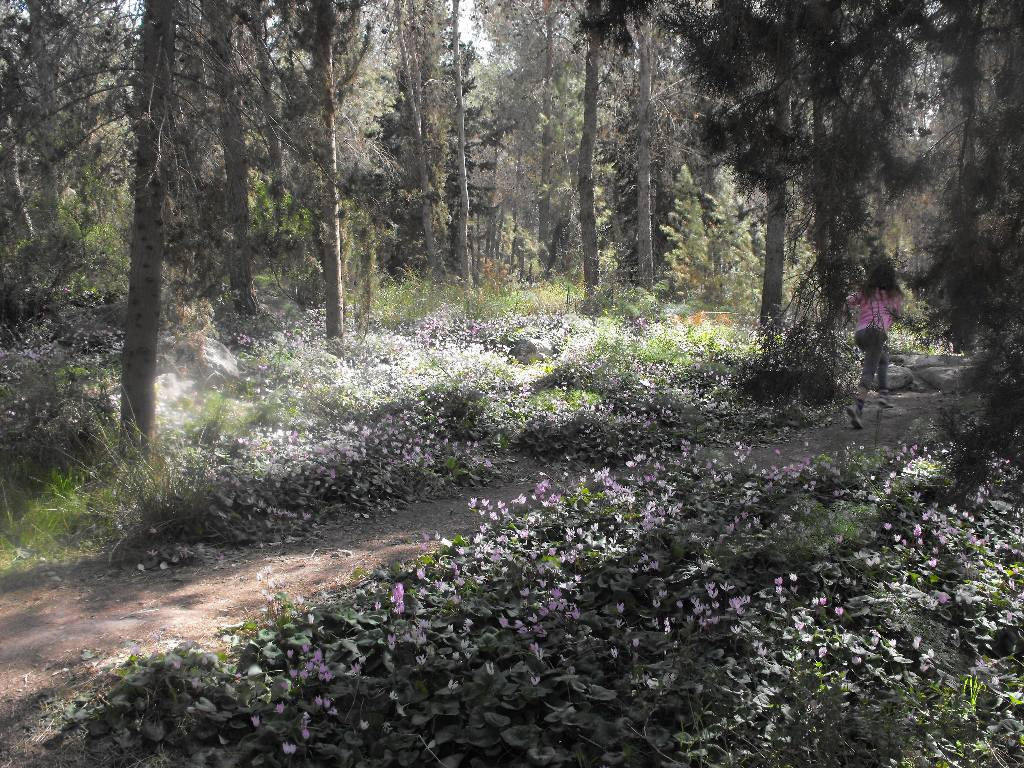
Cyclamen persicum flowers on Cyclamen Hill

Tal Shahar (Hebrew: טַל שַׁחַר, lit. 'Dawn Dew') is a moshav in central Israel. Located between Gedera and Latrun, it falls under the jurisdiction of Mateh Yehuda Regional Council. In 2024, it had a population of 1,321.

== History ==
The village was established in 1948 by immigrants from Greece, Poland and Turkey on agricultural lands along the Burma Road. The site had previously belonged to the depopulated Arab village of Khirbat Bayt Far before the 1948 Arab-Israeli War, and was chosen in order to prevent Jerusalem being separated from the rest of Israel. It was named after Henry Morgenthau Jr. (Morgentau is German for Morning Dew).

== Economy ==
Shvil Izim, a goat farm and cafe, is located on the moshav, whose hen houses and cowsheds have been turned into artisanal cheese workshops and boutique wineries. The moshav also operates a banquet hall. The moshav had a tofu factory, considered "the largest and most significant in Israel", owned by the Weiler farm. In 2017, it expanded and relocated to Netivot.
