= Moshe Sardines =

Israeli politician (1917–1984)

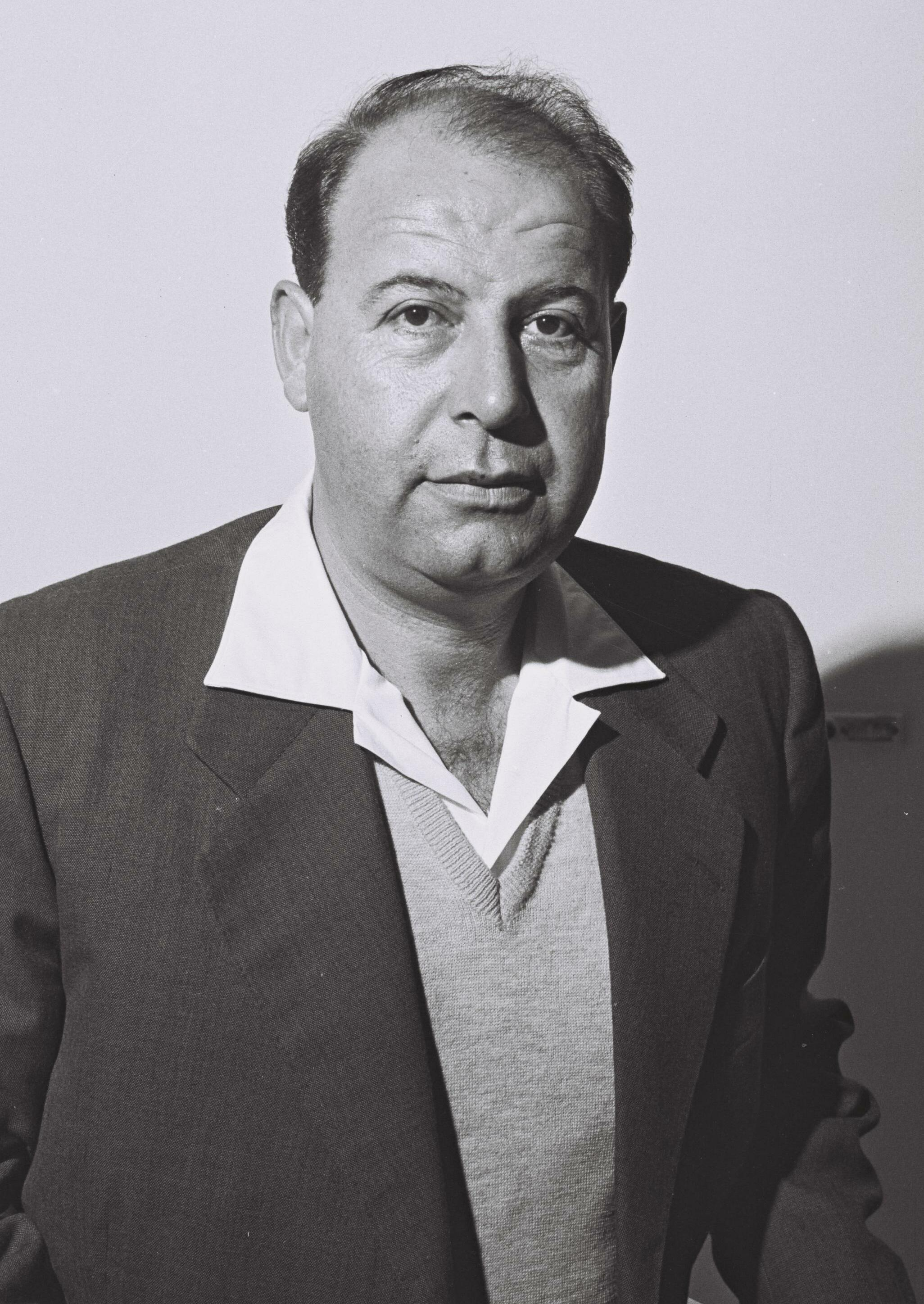
- Sardines in 1959

Faction represented in the Knesset
- 1959–1965: Mapai
- 1965–1968: Alignment
- 1968–1969: Labor Party
- 1969: Alignment

Personal details
- Born: 21 June 1917; Smyrna, Ottoman Empire
- Died: 24 March 1984 (aged 66)

Moshe Sardines (Hebrew: משה סרדינס; 21 June 1917 – 24 March 1984) was an Israeli politician who served as a member of the Knesset for Mapai and its successors from 1959 until 1969. He was born in Smyrna in 1917, and made aliyah to Israel in 1949, where he became a leader of the Moshavim Movement.

== Biography ==
Born in Smyrna in the Ottoman Empire (now İzmir in Turkey), Sardines emigrated to Israel in 1949. He was amongst the founders of a moshav Geva Carmel, and headed its committee. He was also amongst the leadership of the Moshavim Movement, and managed its purchasing organisation.

A member of Mapai, he was placed 28th on the party's list for the 1959 Knesset elections, and was elected as the party won 47 seats. He was re-elected in 1961 in 27th place, and 1965 (in 30th place), by which time Mapai had formed the Labour Alignment alliance. He did not stand in the 1969 elections. During his last term, he served as a Deputy Speaker.

Sardines died in 1984 at the age of 66.
