= Wadi Rabah culture =

Archaeological culture of the Southern Levant

- Wadi Rabah (Levant)
- Geographical range: Southern Levant
- Period: Late Neolithic
- Dates: c. 5500 BC – 4500 BC
- Major sites: Sepphoris
- Preceded by: Yarmukian; Lodian; Nizzanim
- Followed by: Ghassulian

The Wadi Rabah culture is a Pottery Neolithic/Early Chalcolithic archaeological culture of the Southern Levant, dating to the middle of the 5th millennium BCE.

== Research ==
This period was first identified at the ancient site of Jericho (Tell es-Sultan) by British archaeologists John Garstang and Kathleen Kenyon in separate excavations. Kenyon has named this period in Jericho "Pottery Neolithic B", a name now regarded as synonymous with the modernly defined Early Chalcolithic. The name "Wadi Rabah" was since used in archaeologic literature thanks to the works of Israeli archaeologist Jacob Kaplan at the site of Wadi Rabah.

== Settlements ==
This culture is known from a small amount of sites, in some of which remains of small rectangular structures were discovered. Some larger structures were found in Munhata, Wadi Rabah and Ein el-Jarba, though Israeli archaeologist Yosef Garfinkel suggests that large courtyard structures were erected in that period, like the ones found at Sha'ar HaGolan of the preceding Yarmukian culture (c. 6400–6000 BCE) and Tel Tsaf of the following Early/Middle Chalcolithic period (c. 5300–4500 BCE).

== Sites ==
- Wadi Rabah
- Baysamun
- Dan
- Kfar Giladi
- HaGoshrim
- Nahal Betzet
- Tel Teo
- Kabri
- Horvat Uza
- Kiryat Ata
- Sepphoris
- Tel Ali
- Yizre'el
- Tel Yosef
- Abu Zurayq
- Ein el-Jarba
- Munhata
- Nahal Zehora
- Al-Shuna al-Shamalyah
- En Esur
- Abu Hamid
- Habashan street
- Lod
- Tell es-Sultan
- Kidron Valley
- Atlit Yam
- Teluliot Batashi

== See also ==
- Yarmukian culture
- Lodian culture
