= Lodian culture =

Late Neolithic archaeological culture of the Southern Levant

- Late Neolithic cultures in the Southern Levant: Yarmukian; Lodian; Nizzanim
- Alternative names: Jericho IX
- Geographical range: Southern Levant
- Period: Late Neolithic
- Type site: Lod
- Major sites: Tel Lachish
- Preceded by: Khiamian
- Followed by: Wadi Rabah

The Lodian culture or Jericho IX culture is a Pottery Neolithic archaeological culture of the Southern Levant dating from the first half of the 5th millennium BC, existing alongside the Yarmukian and Nizzanim cultures. The Lodian culture appears mainly in areas south of the territory of the Yarmukian culture, in the Shfela and the beginning of the Israeli coastal plain; the Judaean Mountains, and in the desert regions around the Dead Sea and south of it.

The Jericho IX culture is defined by its distinctive pottery. It was first identified by John Garstang during his excavations of the eponymous Layer IX at Jericho. Thomas Levy later coined the term Lodian, shifting the type site to that of Lod, first excavated by Jacob Kaplan in the 1950s. The relationship between the Lodian culture and the two other Southern Levantine Pottery Neolithic cultures, the Yarmoukian and the Wadi Raba culture, has been debated for many years. Levy argued that it was a short-lived but distinct tradition that emerged after the Yarmoukian and before the Wadi Raba.

== Settlements ==
Most known settlements associated with the Lodian culture were small and ephemeral. From the few sites remains of architecture have been found, it appears the inhabitants lived in circular, semi-subterranean rounded structures, 2–3 m (6 ft 7 in – 9 ft 10 in) in diameter, made from mudbrick. Next to the structures were many pits dug by these inhabitants. They kept domestic animals, including sheep, goats, cattle and pigs, and also fished and hunted wild gazelle. It is assumed that they also grew the typical Neolithic crops, e.g. cereals and legumes, but no archaeobotanical evidence has been recovered from Lodian sites to confirm this.

Sites with Lodian material include Jericho, Lod, Tel Megiddo, Ghrubba, Yesodot, Teluliot Batashi, Tel Lachish, Tel Ali, Abu Zurayq, Wadi Shueib, Dhra′, Khirbet ed-Dharih, Nizzanim, and En Esur.

Very few burials have been found at Lodian sites. The inhabitants may have disposed of their dead in other ways, or used dedicated cemeteries away from settlements, as the later Wadi Raba culture was known to do.

== Tools ==
Lodian pottery slightly differs in shape to the Yarmukian pottery and in decoration. One of the noted differences is more complexity in paste preparation and another being in its variety of vessel forms. The typical Lodian pottery vessels are painted and burnished, with distinctive geometric motifs. One of these types is the Jericho IX Jar, which possesses distinction by its more common appearance in Lodian culture. It usually has a rounded rim, flared neck, and 2 thick looped handles from the upper neck to its shoulders.

Its lithic industry is dominated by flake tools, including several characteristic types of arrowheads (Haparsa, Nizzanim, and Herzlia points) and sickle blades. Bipolar cores, common in preceding cultures, disappeared during the Lodian. Figurines and other ritual objects are notably rare in Lodian assemblages, unlike the Yarmoukian. The flint tools area also similar to those of the Yarmukian. One distinctive type of flint tool that is unique to the Lodian culture is a rectangular sickle, shaped with pressure flaking.
