= Nomadic pastoralism =

Form of pastoralism

Nomadic pastoralism, also known as nomadic herding or pastoral nomadism, is a form of pastoralism in which livestock are herded in order to seek for fresh pastures on which to graze. True nomads follow an irregular pattern of movement, in contrast with transhumance, where seasonal pastures are fixed. However, this distinction is often not observed and the term 'nomad' used for both—and in historical cases the regularity of movements is often unknown in any case. The herded livestock include cattle, water buffalo, yaks, llamas, sheep, goats, reindeer, horses, donkeys or camels, or mixtures of species. Nomadic pastoralism is commonly practiced in regions with little arable land, typically in the developing world, especially in the steppe lands north of the agricultural zone of Eurasia. Pastoralists often trade with sedentary agrarians, exchanging meat for grains; however, they have been known to raid.

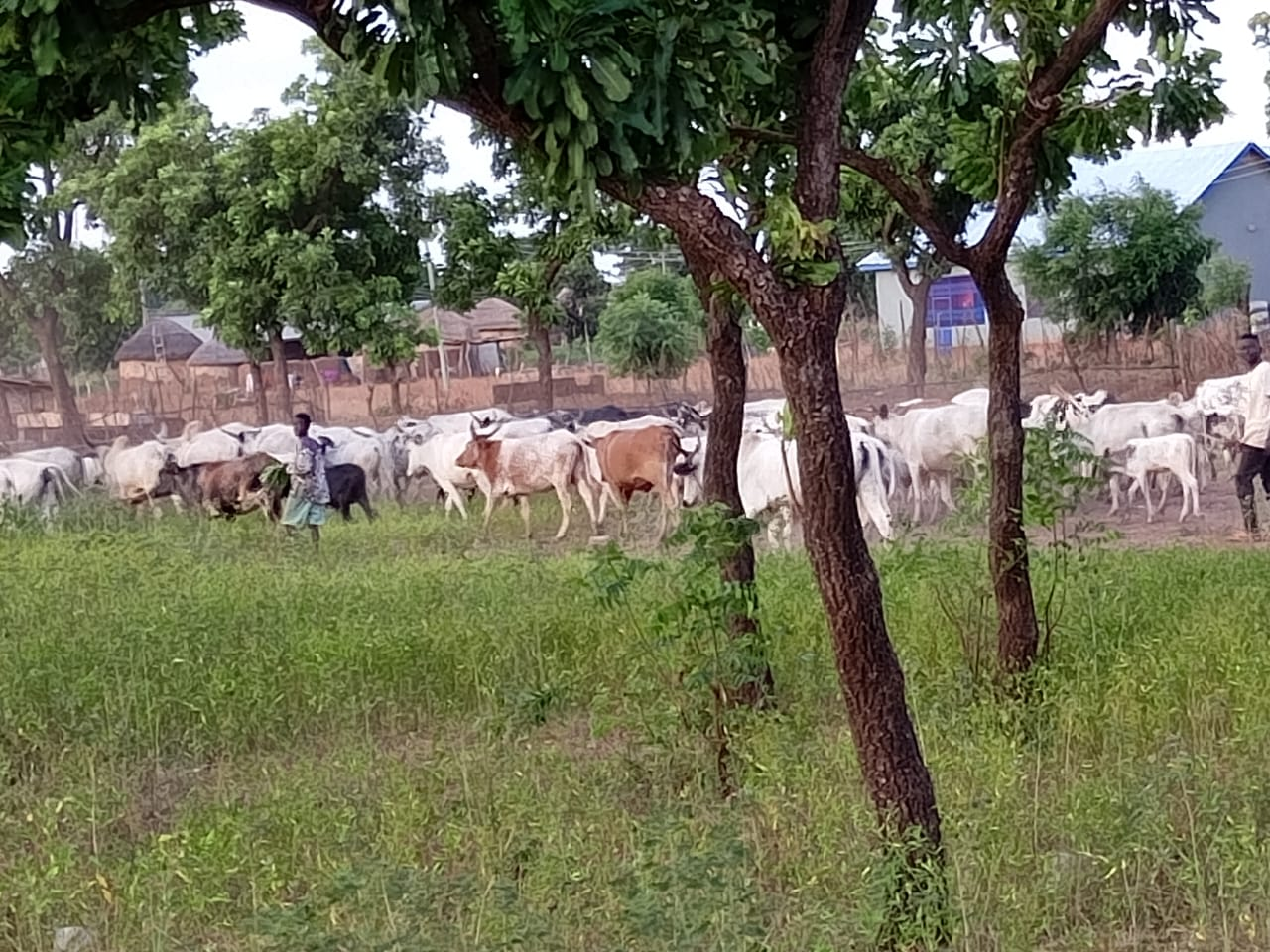
Nomadic Herders Grazing Livestock in Nigeria.

Of the estimated 30–40 million nomadic pastoralists worldwide, most are found in central Asia and the Sahel region of North and West Africa, such as Fulani, Tuaregs, and Toubou, with some also in the Middle East, such as traditionally Bedouins, and in other parts of Africa, such as Nigeria and Somalia. Increasing numbers of stock may lead to overgrazing of the area and desertification if lands are not allowed to fully recover between one grazing period and the next. Increased enclosure and fencing of land has reduced the amount of land for this practice.

There is substantive uncertainty over the extent to which the various causes for degradation affect grassland. Different causes have been identified which include overgrazing, mining, agricultural reclamation, pests and rodents, soil properties, tectonic activity, and climate change. Simultaneously, it is maintained that some, such as overgrazing and overstocking, may be overstated while others, such as climate change, mining and agricultural reclamation, may be under reported. In this context, there is also uncertainty as to the long-term effect of human behavior on the grassland as compared to non-biotic factors.

== Origin and history ==
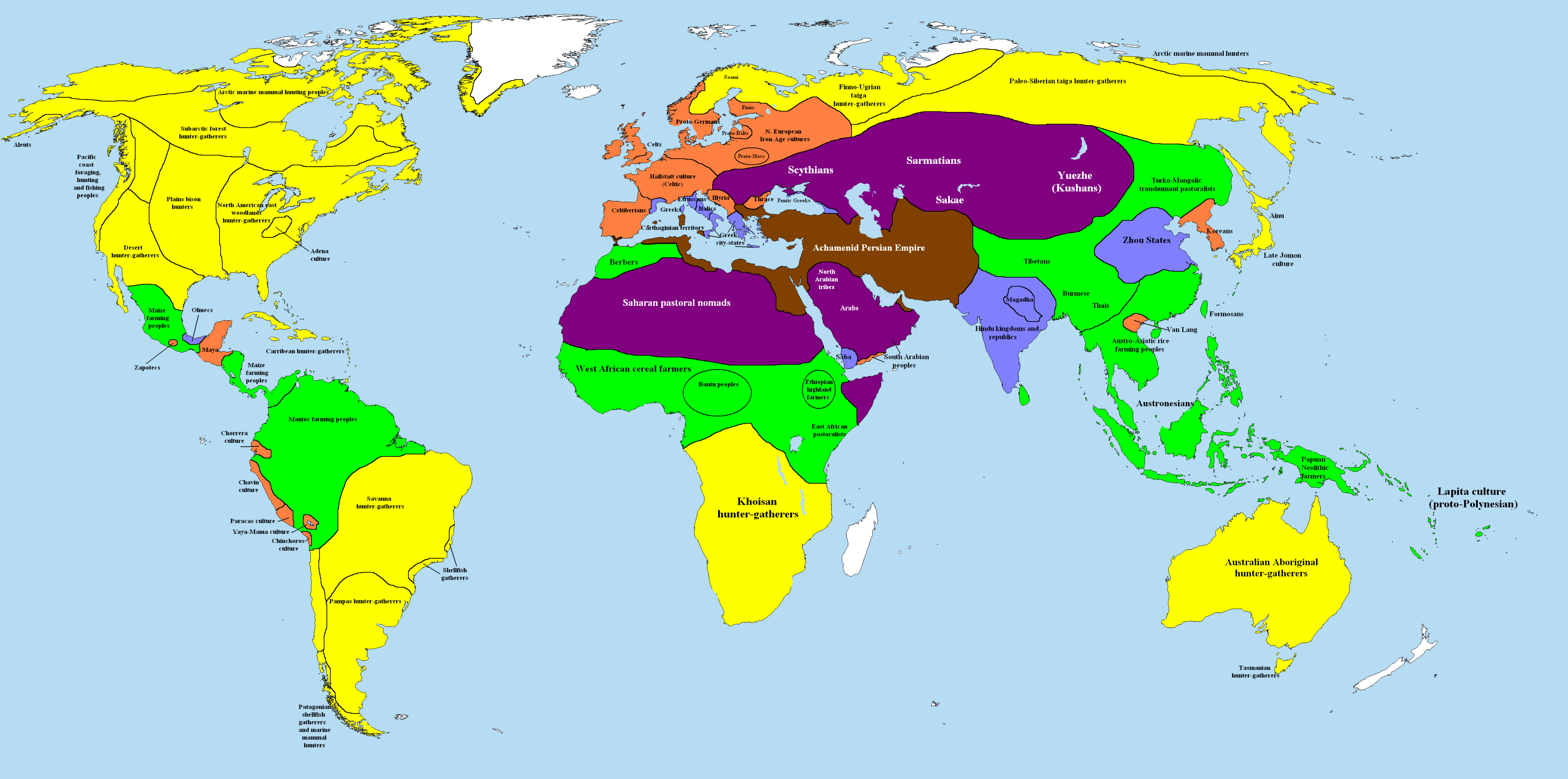
Overview map of the world in the mid 1st millennium BC: nomadic pastoralists

Nomadic pastoralism was a result of the Neolithic Revolution and the rise of agriculture. During that revolution, humans began domesticating animals and plants for food and started forming cities. Nomadism generally has existed in symbiosis with such settled cultures trading animal products (meat, hides, wool, cheese and other animal products) for manufactured items not produced by the nomadic herders. Henri Fleisch tentatively suggested the Shepherd Neolithic industry of Lebanon may date to the Epipaleolithic and that it may have been used by one of the first cultures of nomadic shepherds in the Beqaa Valley. Andrew Sherratt demonstrates that "early farming populations used livestock mainly for meat, and that other applications were explored as agriculturalists adapted to new conditions, especially in the semi‐arid zone."

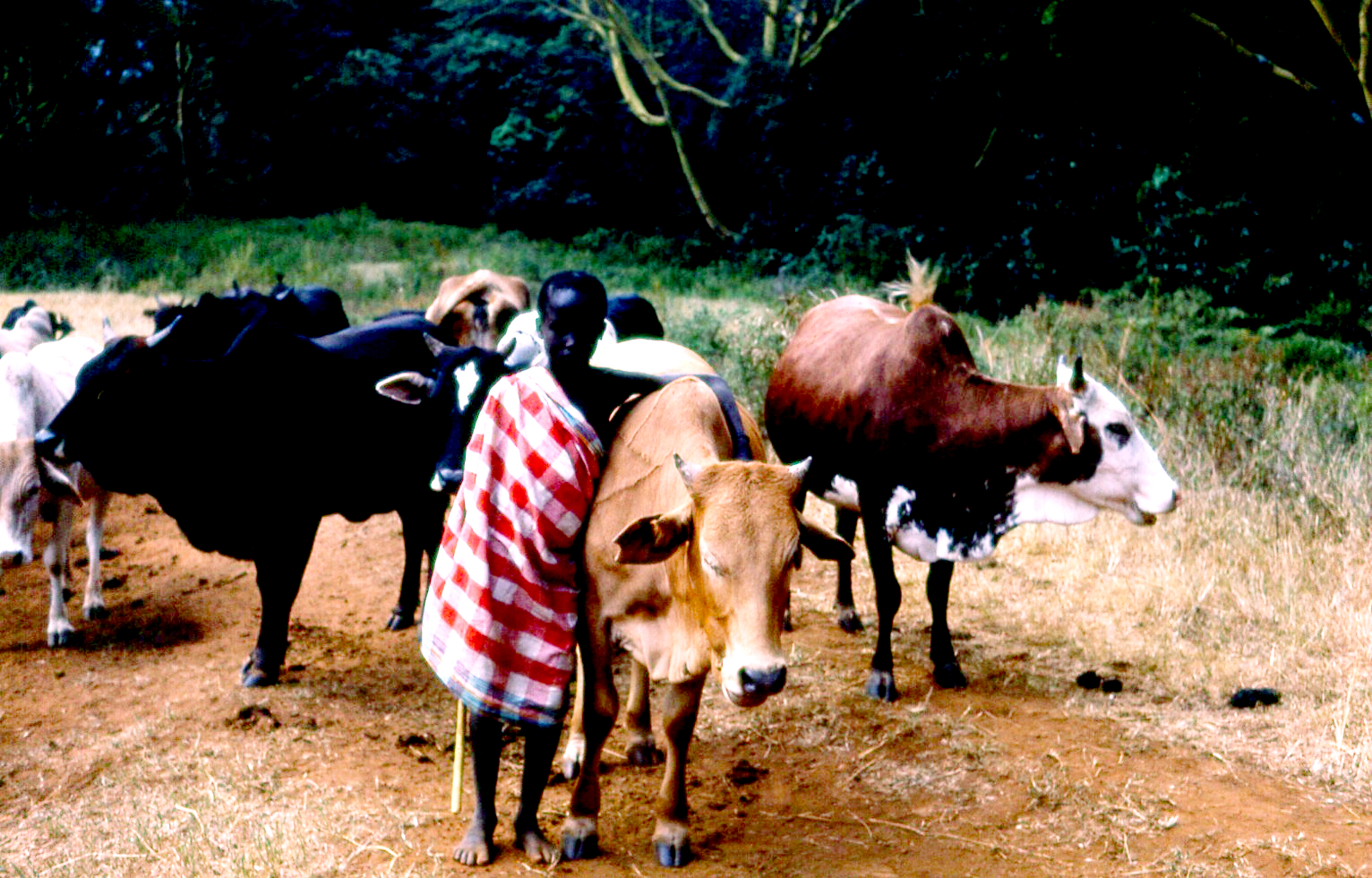
A young Maasai cattle herder in Kenya.

In the past it was asserted that pastoral nomads left no presence archaeologically or were impoverished, but this has now been challenged, and was clearly not so for many ancient Eurasian nomads, who have left very rich kurgan burial sites. Pastoral nomadic sites are identified based on their location outside the zone of agriculture, the absence of grains or grain-processing equipment, limited and characteristic architecture, a predominance of sheep and goat bones, and by ethnographic analogy to modern pastoral nomadic peoples. Juris Zarins has proposed that pastoral nomadism began as a cultural lifestyle in the wake of the 6200 BC climatic crisis when Harifian pottery making hunter-gatherers in the Sinai fused with Pre-Pottery Neolithic B agriculturalists to produce the Munhata culture, a nomadic lifestyle based on animal domestication, developing into the Yarmoukian and thence into a circum-Arabian nomadic pastoral complex, and spreading Proto-Semitic languages.

In Bronze Age Central Asia, nomadic populations are associated with the earliest transmissions of millet and wheat grains through the region that eventually became central for the Silk Road. Early Indo-European migrations from the Pontic–Caspian steppe spread Yamnaya Steppe pastoralist ancestry and Indo-European languages across large parts of Eurasia. By the medieval period in Central Asia, nomadic communities exhibited isotopically diverse diets, suggesting a multitude of subsistence strategies.

== Nomadic pattern in season ==
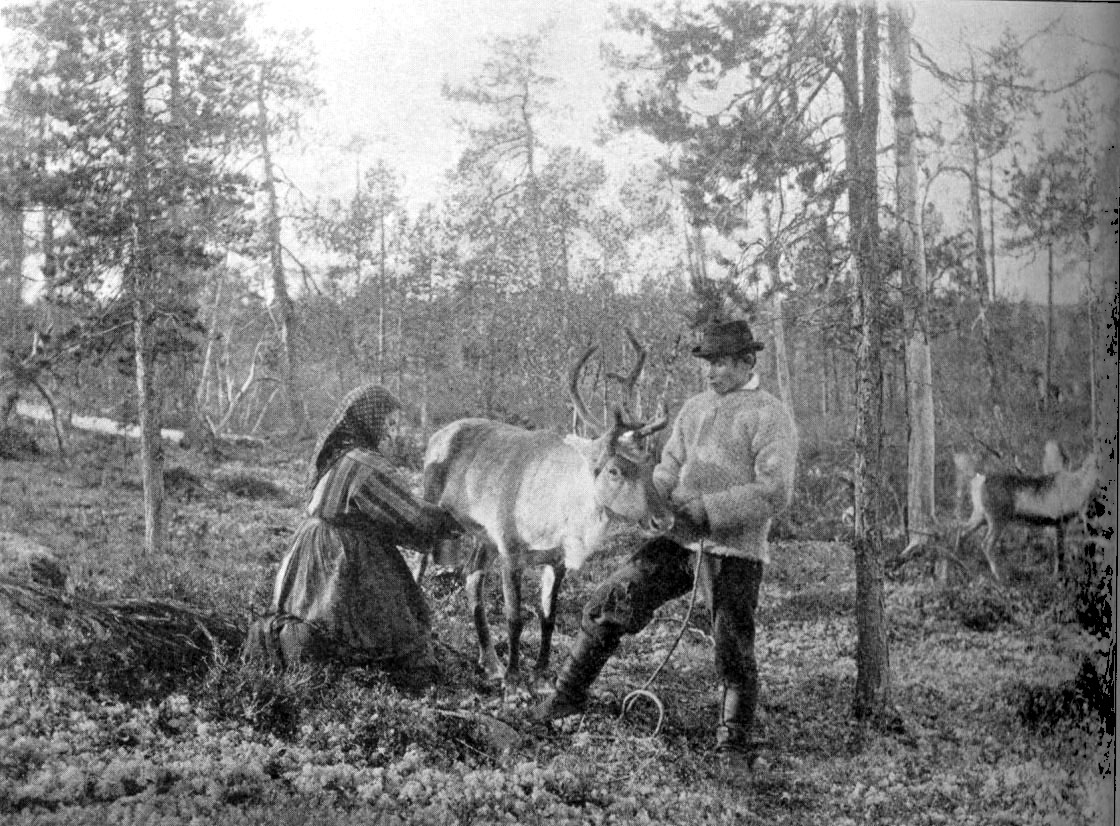
Reindeer milking in a forest; western Finnmark, late 1800s

Often traditional nomadic groups settle into a regular seasonal pattern of transhumance. An example of a normal nomadic cycle in the northern hemisphere is:

- Spring (early April to the end of June) – transition
- Summer (end of June to late September) – a higher plateau
- Autumn (mid-September to end of November) – transition
- Winter (from December to the end of March) – desert plains.

The movements in this example are approximately 180 to 200 km. Camps are established in the same place each year; often, semi-permanent shelters are built in at least one place on this migration route.

In sub-regions, such as in Chad, the nomadic pastoralist cycle is as follows:

- In the rainy season, the groups live in a village intended for a comfortable stay. The villages are often made of sturdy materials such as clay. Old men and women remain in this village when the other people move the herds in the dry season.
- In the dry season, the people move their herds to southern villages with a more temporary character. They then move inland, where they stay in tent camps.

In Chad, the sturdy villages are called hillé, the less sturdy villages are called dankhout and the tents ferik.

== David Christian's account ==
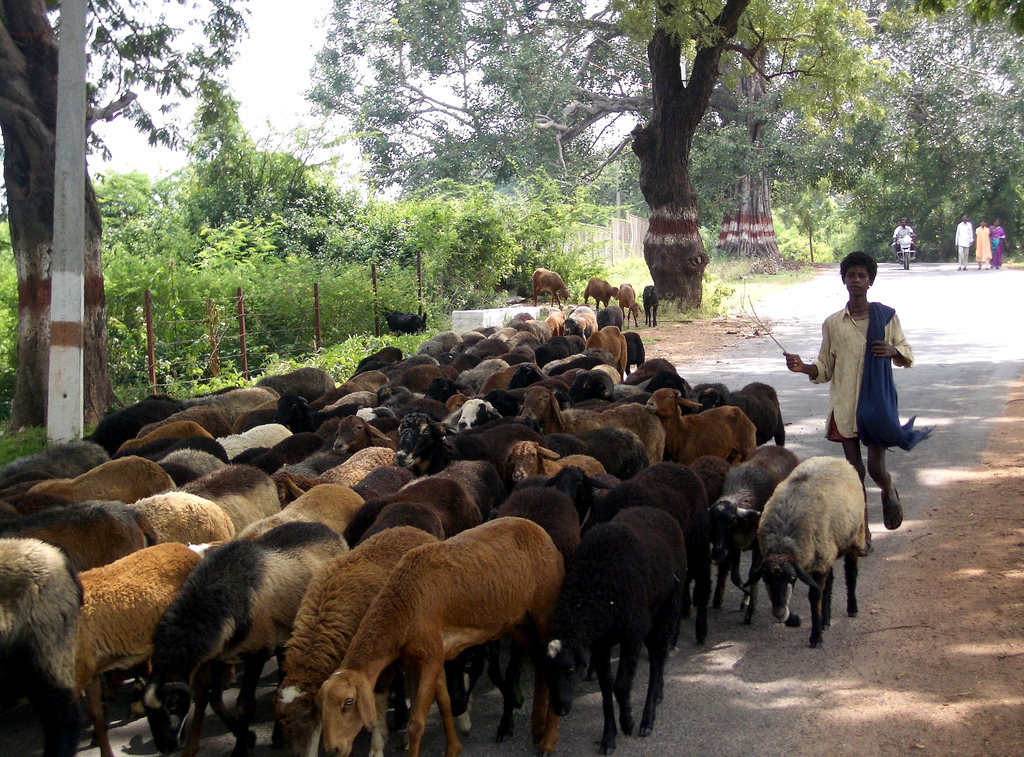
A boy herding a flock of sheep in India

David Christian made the following observations about pastoralism. The agriculturist lives from domesticated plants and the pastoralist lives from domesticated animals. Since animals are higher on the food chain, pastoralism supports a thinner population than agriculture. Pastoralism predominates where low rainfall makes farming impractical. Full pastoralism required the Secondary products revolution when animals began to be used for wool, milk, riding and traction as well as meat. Where grass is poor herds must be moved, which leads to nomadism. Some peoples are fully nomadic while others live in sheltered winter camps and lead their herds into the steppe in summer. Some nomads travel long distances, usually north in summer and south in winter. Near mountains, herds are led uphill in summer and downhill in winter (transhumance). Pastoralists often trade with or raid their agrarian neighbors.

Christian distinguished 'Inner Eurasia', which was pastoral with a few hunter-gatherers in the far north, from 'Outer Eurasia', a crescent of agrarian civilizations from Europe through India to China. High civilization is based on agriculture where tax-paying peasants support landed aristocrats, kings, cities, literacy and scholars. Pastoral societies are less developed and as a result, according to Christian, more egalitarian. One tribe would often dominate its neighbors, but these 'empires' usually broke up after a hundred years or so. The heartland of pastoralism is the Eurasian steppe. In the center of Eurasia pastoralism extended south to Iran and surrounded agrarian oasis cities. When pastoral and agrarian societies went to war, horse-borne mobility counterbalanced greater numbers. Attempts by agrarian civilizations to conquer the steppe usually failed until the last few centuries. Pastoralists frequently raided and sometimes collected regular tribute from their farming neighbors. Especially in north China and Iran, they would sometimes conquer agricultural societies, but these dynasties were usually short-lived and broke up when the nomads became 'civilized' and lost their warlike virtues.

== Around the world ==
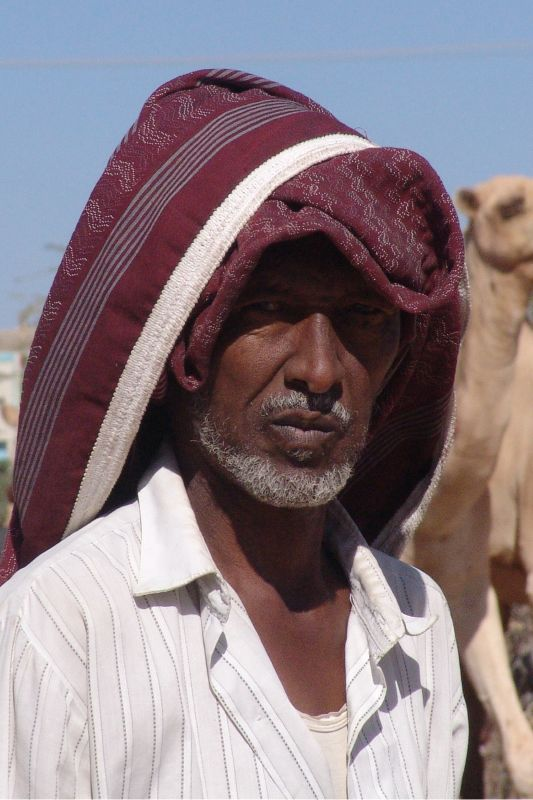
A camel trader in Hargeisa, Somaliland.

Nomadic pastoralism was historically widespread throughout less fertile regions of Earth. It is found in areas of low rainfall such as Arabian Peninsula (except Yemen) inhabited by Bedouins, as well as Northeast Africa inhabited, among other ethnic groups, by Somalis (where camel, cattle, sheep and goat nomadic pastoralism is especially common). Nomadic transhumance is also common in areas of harsh climate, such as Northern Europe and Russia inhabited by the indigenous Sami people, Nenets people and Chukchis. There are an estimated 30–40 million nomads in the world. Pastoral nomads and semi-nomadic pastoralists form a significant but declining minority in such countries as Saudi Arabia (probably less than 3%), Iran (4%), and Afghanistan (at most 10%). They comprise less than 2% of the population in the countries of North Africa except Libya and Mauritania.

The Eurasian steppe has been largely populated by pastoralist nomads since the late prehistoric times, with a succession of peoples known by the names given to them by surrounding literate sedentary societies, including the Bronze Age Proto-Indo-Europeans, and later Proto-Indo-Iranians, Scythians, Sarmatians, Cimmerians, Massagetae, Alans, Pechenegs, Cumans, Kipchaks, Karluks, Saka, Yuezhi, Wusun, Jie, Xiongnu, Xianbei, Khitan, Pannonian Avars, Huns, Mongols, Dzungars and various Turkics.

The Mongols in what is now Mongolia, Russia and China, and the Tatars or Turkic people of Eastern Europe and Central Asia were nomadic people who practiced nomadic transhumance on harsh Asian steppes. Some remnants of these populations are nomadic to this day. In Mongolia, about 40% of the population continues to live a traditional nomadic lifestyle. In China, it is estimated that a little over five million herders are dispersed over the pastoral counties, and more than 11 million over the semi-pastoral counties. This brings the total of the (semi)nomadic herder population to over 16 million, in general living in remote, scattered and resource-poor communities.

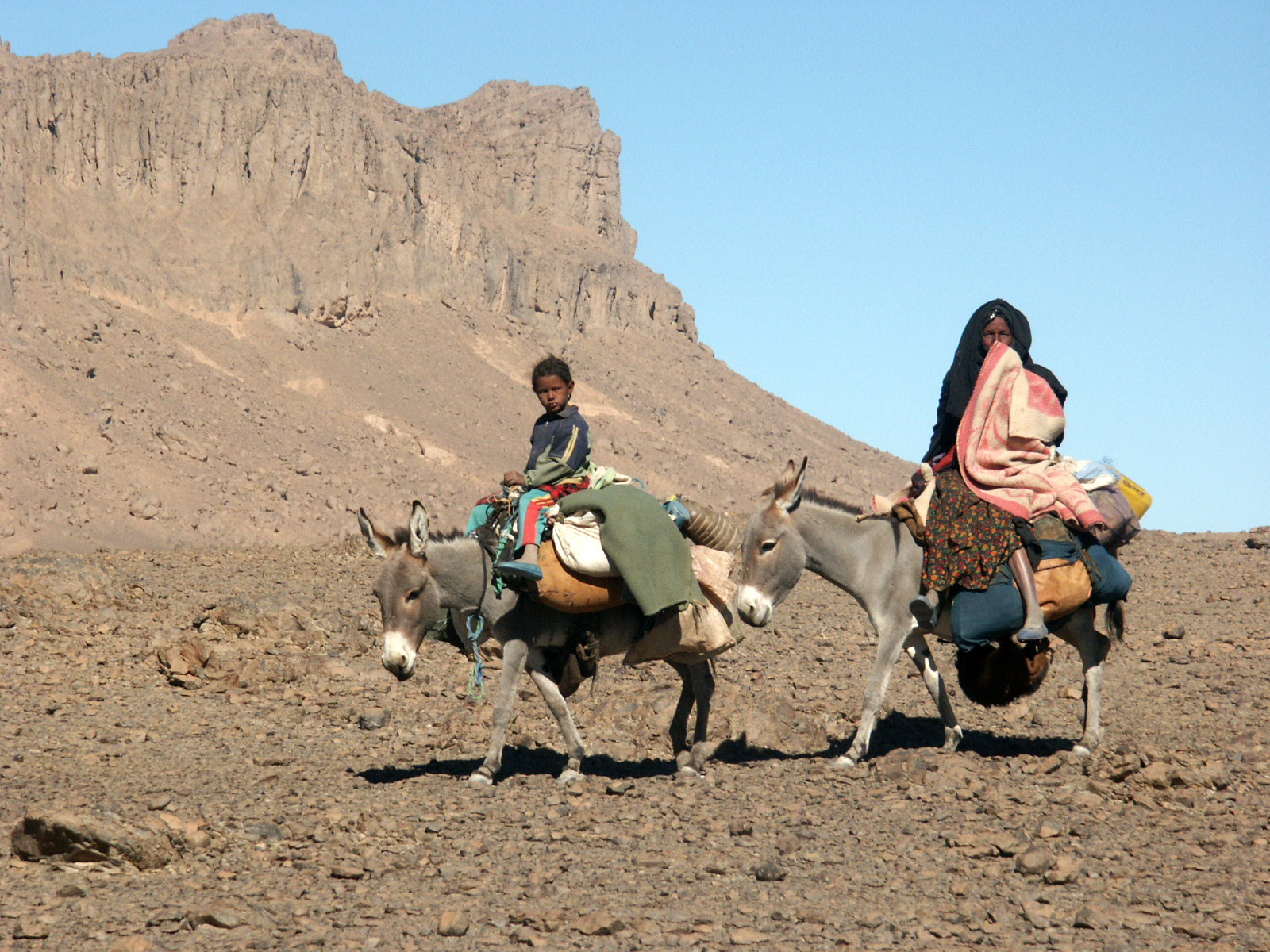
Tuareg nomads in southern Algeria

In the Middle Hills and Himalaya of Nepal, people living above about 2,000 m practise transhumance and nomadic pastoralism because settled agriculture becomes less productive due to steep slopes, cooler temperatures and limited irrigation possibilities. Distances between summer and winter pasture may be short, for example in the vicinity of Pokhara where a valley at about 800 meters elevation is less than 20 km. from alpine pastures just below the Annapurna Himalaya, or distances may be 100 km or more. For example, in Rapti zone some 100 km west of Pokhara the Kham Magar move their herds between winter pastures just north of India and summer pastures on the southern slopes of Dhaulagiri Himalaya. In far western Nepal, ethnic Tibetans living in Dolpo and other valleys north among the high Himalaya moved their herds north to winter on the plains of the upper Brahmaputra basin in Tibet proper, until this practice was prohibited after China took over Tibet in 1950–51.

The nomadic Sami people, an indigenous people of northern Finland, Sweden, Norway, and the Kola Peninsula of Russia, practise a form of nomadic transhumance based on reindeer. In the 14th and 15th century, when reindeer population was sufficiently reduced that Sami could not subsist on hunting alone, some Sami, organized along family lines, became reindeer herders. Each family has traditional territories on which they herd, arriving at roughly the same time each season. Only a small fraction of Sami have subsisted on reindeer herding over the past century; as the most colorful part of the population, they are well known. But as elsewhere in Europe, transhumance is dying out.

The Mesta was an association of sheep owners, (Spanish nobility and religious orders) that had an important economic and political role in medieval Castile. To preserve the rights of way of its transhumant herds through cañadas, the Mesta acted against small peasants.

In Chad, nomadic pastoralists include the Zaghawa, Kreda, and Mimi. Farther north in Egypt and western Libya, the Bedouins also practice pastoralism.

== Cross-border pastoralism ==
Sometimes nomadic pastoralists move their herds across international borders in search of new grazing terrain or for trade. This cross-border activity can occasionally lead to tensions with national governments as this activity is often informal and beyond their control and regulation. In East Africa, for example, over 95% of cross-border trade is through unofficial channels and the unofficial trade of live cattle, camels, sheep and goats from Ethiopia sold to Somalia, Kenya and Djibouti generates an estimated total value of between US$250 and US$300 million annually (100 times more than the official figure). This trade helps lower food prices, increase food security, relieve border tensions and promote regional integration. However, the unregulated and undocumented nature of this trade runs risks, such as allowing disease to spread more easily across national borders. Furthermore, governments are unhappy with lost tax revenue and foreign exchange revenues.

There have been initiatives seeking to promote cross-border trade and also document it, in order to both stimulate regional growth and food security, but also to allow the effective vaccination of livestock. Initiatives include Regional Resilience Enhancement Against Drought (RREAD), the Enhanced Livelihoods in Mandera Triangle/Enhanced Livelihoods in Southern Ethiopia (ELMT/ELSE) as part of the Regional Enhanced Livelihoods in Pastoral Areas (RELPA) programme in East Africa, and the Regional Livelihoods Advocacy Project (REGLAP) funded by the European Commission Humanitarian Aid Office (ECHO).

== See also ==
- Holistic management
