= 'En Esur =

Large Chalcolithic village and Early Bronze Age city, Israel

- עין אֵסוּר (Hebrew)
- 'Ein Asawir
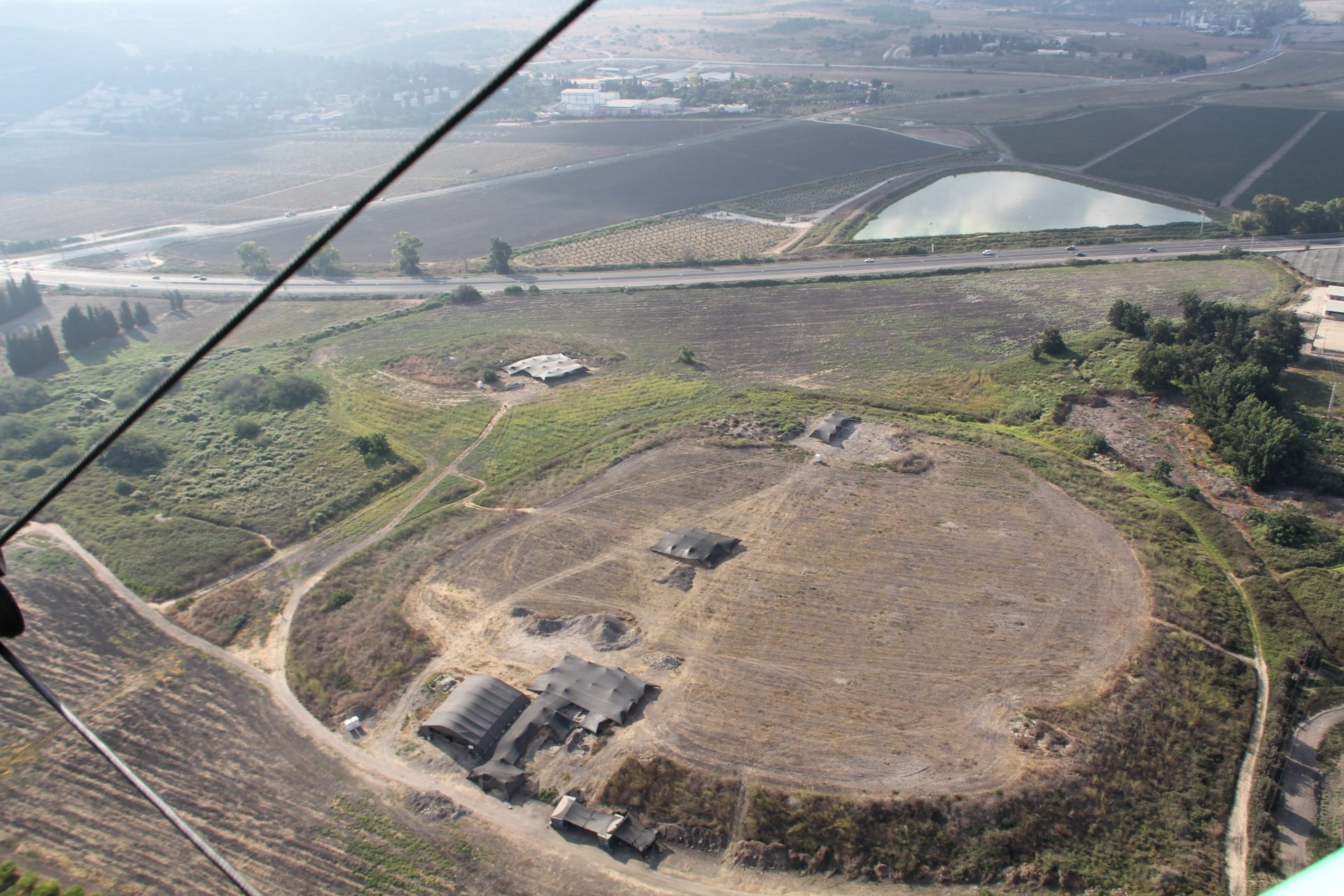
- Aerial photo of Tel Esur in the foreground with En Esur to the left, Highway 65 in the middleground, and Barkai in the background

- Shown in Israel En Esur (Eastern Mediterranean)
- 32°28′55″N 35°1′10″E
- Type: Settlement
- Periods: Pottery Neolithic (PN) – Early Bronze Age I (EBI)
- Cultures: Yarmukian (PN), post-Wadi Rabah culture (Early Chalcolithic), Ghassulian (Late Chalcolithic), Canaanite (Early Bronze Age IA)
- Location: Menashe, Haifa, Israel
- Region: Canaan, Southern Levant

History
- Built: c. 5000 BC
- Abandoned: c. 2900 BC

Site notes
- Area: 50 ha (120 acres)
- Archaeologists: Adam Zertal (2000–2002); Shay Bar (2010–2014); Itai Elad, Yitzhak Paz, Dina Shalem (2017–2019)

'En Esur, also En Esur (Hebrew: עין אֵסוּר; [ʕen ʔesuʁ] eh-N eh-s-oor) or Ein Asawir (Arabic: عين الأساور, lit. 'Spring of the Bracelets'), is an ancient site located on the northern Sharon Plain, at the entrance of the Wadi Ara pass leading from the Coastal Plain further inland. The site includes an archaeological mound (tell), called Tel Esur or Tell el-Asawir, another unnamed mound, and two springs, one of which gives the site its name.

A 7,000-year-old Early Chalcolithic large village already showing signs of incipient urbanisation and with an open space used for cultic activities was discovered at the site below later, Bronze Age remains.

During the Early Bronze Age, around 3000 BCE, a massive fortified proto-city with an estimated population of 5,000 to 6,000 inhabitants existed there. It was the largest city in the region, larger than other significant sites such as Megiddo and Jericho, but smaller than more distant ones in Egypt and Mesopotamia. The city was discovered in 1977, but its massive extent was realized only in 1993. A major excavation between 2017 and 2019 ahead of the construction of a highway interchange exposed the city's houses, streets and public structures, as well as countless artifacts including pottery, figurines and tools. Archaeologists announced its discovery in 2019, calling it the "New York of the Early Bronze Age".

== Excavations ==
The site is known in Arabic as Tell el-Asawir. The mound covers an area of around 5.5 acres with a maximum height of 11 meters above the plain. It appears in the 1799 map drawn by French geographer Pierre Jacotin. American archaeologist and biblical scholar William F. Albright visited the site during his 1923 trip to Mandatory Palestine. He recalled the opinion of German scholar Albrecht Alt that Tel Esur is the site of an ancient city called "Yaham", located just north of the Menashe Heights and mentioned in the sources of the 15th-century BCE Egyptian pharaoh Thutmose III, who campaigned against a coalition of Canaanite city-states led by the king of Kadesh and gave battle at Megiddo. According to the Egyptian account, Thutmose III camped in Yaham before he marched on Megiddo and captured the city. Albright stated that the location of the site corresponds with the geographic descriptions of the Egyptian sources, and his discovery of Bronze Age pottery while surveying the mound further confirmed this identification in his opinion. Today however, Yaham is identified with a site located at the Arab village of Kafr Yama, since 1988 part of Zemer, some 10 kilometers south of Tel Esur.

The discovery of the larger site around Tel Esur and its springs occurred in 1977, during the digging of a water reservoir south of the mound. A salvage excavation was conducted by archaeologists Azriel Zigelman and Ram Gofna of the Tel Aviv University. They discovered two settlement layers, one from the Chalcolithic period (the last period of the Stone Age) and the Early Bronze Age. The former included the foundations of structures made of rough stones and some installations. These are dated to the Early Chalcolithic (c. 6000 years ago). The latter included the foundations of massive structures made of large stones. The widest wall measured 1.7 meters in width. The pottery there is dated to the Early Bronze Age I period (3300–3000 BCE).

The site was surveyed by Yehuda Neʾeman and by the Manasseh Hill Country Survey. A survey and an excavation was conducted in 1993 by Eli Yannai of the Israel Antiquities Authority (IAA). It revealed the massive extent of the site during the Early Bronze Age, as well as settlement remains from the Neolithic and Chalcolithic periods, and sherds from the Byzantine and Ottoman periods.

The site was excavated between 2000 and 2002 by a team led by A. Zertal. En Esur was excavated by professional and volunteer archaeologists between January 2017 and 2019, with the research overseen by archaeologists Itai Elad and Yitzhak Paz. The work was organized in part by the Israel Antiquities Authority and financed by Netivei Israel, Israel's national transportation infrastructure company. During the process of excavation, archaeologists found a temple within the city that was built approximately 2,000 years before the rest of the site.

In an announcement of their discovery, researchers called En Esur "cosmopolitan" and the "New York of the Early Bronze Age".

== Location ==
'En Esur stands in the northern Sharon plain, c. 1 km east of Moshav Ein Iron, at the outlet of Wadi Ara, a valley which allowed the ancient international coastal highway to bypass the difficult section squeezed between the sea and western Mount Carmel by passing through the mountain. Today, the important Highway 65 follows the same route and cuts through the archaeological site of En Sur.

== History ==
The site of En Esur consists of three elements: Tel Esur, which is the main tell (a mound of accumulated human settlement layers) covering c. 28 dunams, a smaller mound southeast of it, and an open field that surrounds the mounds, which was occupied by a massive, densely built city during the Early Bronze Age. The site is supported by two abundant water springs: 'En Esur or 'En Arubot, east of the tell, which gives the site its name; and a second, unnamed one southwest of the tell.

=== Neolithic ===
Potsherds and stone tools found in the lowest levels excavated in the area south of Tel Esur (Area A) show that the site was occupied during the Pottery Neolithic period. Little is known about this phase; no traces of structures were found, and only a few artefacts. Both the pottery and the stone tools resemble those of the Jericho IX culture.

=== Chalcolithic ===
==== Early Chalcolithic ====
Plan of En Esur showing its immediate surroundings and the areas excavated as of 2019. The site encompasses two tells (including Tel Esur) and two springs (including En Esur) on either side of Highway 65. In addition to the road, the site has been disturbed by modern developments including several buildings and a reservoir. Extent of the site Excavated areas Rivers/reservoir Springs/streams Roads/tracks Modern buildings

The site was occupied throughout the Early Chalcolithic period, founded around 5000 BC. There were only scattered finds from Early Chalcolithic I and a small occupation in Early Chalcolithic III. It was during the Early Chalcolithic II (EC II) period that the site became a significant place, reaching a size of 50 hectares.

The archaeologists uncovered a c. 60 m^{2} large area, free of dwellings, used for cultic activities. It was found to contain numerous articulated sheep, cattle and pig bones, showing that animal parts had been buried in this open area during ritual ceremonies. Some 40 metres south of there, a shallow pit containing animal bones as well as the head of an anthropomorphic clay figurine was discovered, which may also be indicative of some cultic activity. The entire space between the two findings, set at the margin of the settlement, was likely kept open for cultic activity and other functions, although it cannot be ruled out that some mud-brick buildings had stood there without leaving any discernible remains. Intramural burials of adults and infants were also found as well as 237 biconvex slingstones and zoomorphic figurines, all in the EC II level.

=== Early Bronze Age ===
==== Early Bronze Age IB ====
In the Early Bronze IB (c. 3350/3300-3050/3000 BCE), the rural village transformed into a proto-urban large, fortified town.

===== City =====
Above the Early Chalcolithic settlement, a large walled Early Bronze Age city was discovered. It occupied a space of around 0.65 square kilometers (160 acres) and may have had 5,000 to 6,000 inhabitants. This would have made the settlement much larger than Tel Megiddo in Israel and Jericho in the West Bank, and therefore the largest settlement in the Southern Levant during this period, but smaller than more distant cities in Egypt and Mesopotamia. Archaeologist Itai Elad stated that En Esur is double the size of other large settlements known in the area. Researchers excavating the site have said that it demonstrates early processes of urbanization within Canaanite civilization, and that the city would have probably possessed a substantial "administrative mechanism." Haaretz described the site as "vastly bigger than anything thought possible in the Southern Levant 5,000 years ago." Its discoverers have called the city a "megalopolis".

===== Structure and character =====
The settlement is believed to have existed at the crossroads of two important trading routes. Archaeologists excavating the site believe that the city was planned, and included not only streets, alleys and squares, but also facilities for storage and drainage, and a cemetery. En Esur was surrounded by fortified walls that were 2 metres (6.6 feet) high.

The site includes about four million artefacts overall, with millions of potsherds and flint tools, and some basalt stone vessels. These included knives related to Caananite blades. The inhabitants of En Esur are thought to have been an agricultural people. They would have traded with other regions and kingdoms. Archaeologists found pottery originating in the Jordan Valley, and sealed imprints on tools demonstrate that these were brought from Egypt.

===== Temple =====
A temple was found within the city, which was located in a public area and includes a courtyard with a huge stone basin for rituals. Burnt animal bones were found inside the temple, providing evidence of possible ritual sacrifices. Several figurines were also unearthed inside the temple, including a human head and a seal impression showing a cultic scene with person in a supplicant position and raising his hands with a horned animal next to him.

===== Necropolis =====
Burial caves dating from the fourth to the second millennium BCE were found at Tell el-Asawir during 1953 excavations. The Tell el-Asawir necropolis, located near a stone quarry, underwent a salvage excavation in 2003, resulting in a find presented to the press as "the largest Bronze Age necropolis in the world". The Ministry of Religious Affairs intervened and the thousands of human skeletons excavated from burial chambers measuring up to 100 m^{2} had to be reburied before they could be scientifically studied, although their age excluded the possibility of them being the remains of Jews, which are not to be disturbed under Jewish religious laws.

==== Early Bronze IIA ====
The settlement was abandoned some time towards the end of Early Bronze Age IB (c. 3050/3000 BCE), much like other nearby sites at this time with the end of the Uruk Period, such as Tel Bet She'an and Tel Megiddo, between 3000 and 2800 BCE. In Egypt, the rise of the 1st Dynasty with Narmer and Aha occurred in the final EB IB, with Djer marking the transitional EB IB/EB IIA. Trade centers in Lower Egypt, such as Tell el-Farkha declined with trade routes changing. Climate conditions during the EB II (c. 3050/3000-2750/2720 BCE) were generally drier before they improved in EB IIIA (c. 2720-2500 BCE), but 'En Esur did not revive as an urban center for the rest of EBA.

=== Middle Bronze Age ===
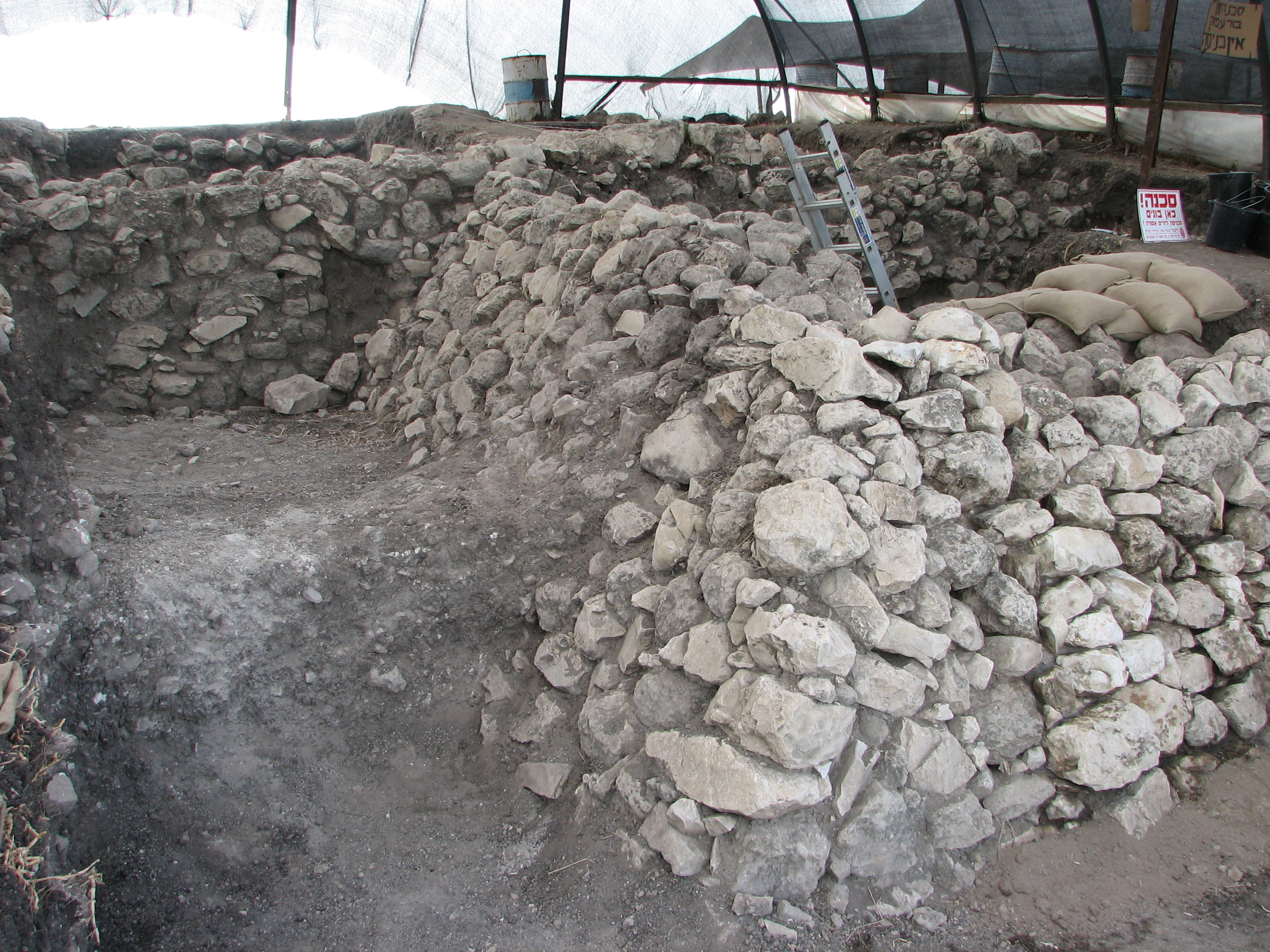
Sloping wall of a tower, part of Middle Bronze IIA city wall

Unlike Tel Bet She'an, Tel Megiddo and other sites in the Levant, there is no evidence of a return to urbanization in the following Middle Bronze Age.

=== Late Bronze Age ===
During the LBA the mound was the site of a small rural settlement, of an agricultural nature, which was covered by a destruction layer. It was located in the northern 2.5 acres of the mound. Finds included large jars, pithoi, and grinding stones as well as a number of flint sickle blades. The pottery assemblage was dated to LB IB/IIA or between 1400 and 1375 BCE. The finds included a royal scarab of Amenhotep III. The regnal dates of this Phaoroh are not known with certainty. Estimates range from 1408 to 1386 BCE to 1390–1352 BCE.

=== Iron Age ===
==== Administrative center ====
In excavations led by S. Bar in 2010–2014 on the western slopes of the small mound (Area D), a large public structure from the early 8th century BCE (Iron Age IIB) came to light. The fortified tower abutted by a storehouse was interpreted as being part of a regional administrative centre, due to similarities with other contemporary public complexes. However, Tel 'Esur is unique in being the only small, countryside settlement, rather than large royal Iron Age estate or city, such as Hazor or Megiddo, where the state or king built an administrative centre. The architectural complex shows enough sophistication to vouch for it being a royal or state-run project, in spite of its size of less than 0.5 ha, which would otherwise be characteristic of a hamlet or farmstead. It comes in the context of both Israel and Judah having many, primarily rural settlements established in the 9th–8th centuries BCE. The excavation director speculates that the Tel 'Esur compound was established during the reign of the Omride king Jeroboam II (786–746 BCE), as part of the measures taken by the kings of Israel to strengthen their grip over the northern valleys and the Shephelah at a time of maximal expansion (see 2 Kgs 14:25). The Tel 'Esur complex is the first official presence along the Wadi Ara pass, proof for the interest of the kings of the northern kingdom in this thoroughfare.

The tower measures c. 13 by 13 metres, with thick outer walls indicative of a considerable height and a certain martial look, although its location at the foot of the mound and the comparatively modest size exclude a military purpose. The entire structure is more likely to have had a mixed role, both practical and political as a built statement of royal power and control over the newly acquired territory. The long, tripartite building adjoining the tower was most probably a warehouse where local produce or different commodities were collected, although some researchers see in such structures stables, barracks, or marketplaces. A typical structure for the Iron Age, such entrepôts are all located next to major trade routes and are commonly found at bottlenecks along the borders of Israel and Judah, with the one at Tel 'Esur being again uniquely placed further in from the border. Its large size and internal separation through solid walls, rather than columns, indicatess that the even larger such structure found at Hazor had served as its prototype.

The building complex was in use for half a century at most, being emptied of goods and abandoned in the mid-8th century, a decade or two before the destructive campaign of Tiglath-Pileser III in 732 BCE. A possible cause might have been Israel's deteriorating relations with Assyria, with the nearby Israelite city of Dor being another example of early abandonment, rather than the more common case of settlements evacuated out of fear during the actual approach of the Assyrian army, or the many destroyed by it.

The site was later occupied in the Persian, Roman, and Byzantine periods.

== Preservation ==
In October 2019, according to Haaretz, En Esur was slated to be paved over by a planned highway interchange for the new town of Harish, with the Smithsonian magazine writing that it will be re-covered, but that the interchange would be built "high over the ruins". All findings were photographed and computer-processed, the 3D documentation of the site allowing archaeologists to continue studying it after it has been covered over. The Agence France-Presse has reported that the road plans have been modified in order to protect the archaeological site.

== See also ==
- List of cities of the ancient Near East
- Khirbet Kerak or Beth Yerah, Early Bronze Age and Persian period city, one of the largest tells in the Levant
- Tel Motza for an even older, Neolithic settlement of comparable size near Jerusalem
- Wadi Ara, Haifa, pre-1948 Arab village near the archaeological site
- Archaeology of Israel
