= Ein el-Jarba =

Coordinates: 32.6383°N 35.1231°E

- Location within Israel
- Type: Settlement
- Periods: Early Chalcolithic; Early Bronze Age IB
- Cultures: Wadi Rabah

Site notes
- Excavation dates: 1966, 1973, 1979, 1980, 2013-2016

Ein el-Jarba is a two-period settlement with remains dating to the Early Chalcolithic (6th millennium BC) and the Early Bronze Age IB (4th millennium BC). The Early Chalcolithic settlement is ascribed to the Wadi Rabah culture. The site is located in the Jezreel Valley, ca. 20 km south-east of Haifa, Israel.

== Geography ==
The site is located at the foot of the Menashe Heights, in the Jezreel Valley, which was – and still is – a main artery connection the Mediterranean coast with the Jordan Rift Valley. Ein el-Jarba is today in the vicinity of Kibbutz HaZore'a.

== Excavation history ==
There have been several excavations on the site. Following the uncovering of remains by mechanical work, one season of excavation was conducted by J. Kaplan in 1966. This was followed by remains being discovered in 1979 c. 75m west of the area uncovered by J. Kaplan; a salvage excavation was conducted in 1980 by E. Meyerhof, recording substantial architectural remains.

Several other sites with Wadi Rabah remains were uncovered nearby, including Tell Qiri (Baruch 1987), Hazorea (Anati 1971; Anati et al. 1973; Meyerhof 1988), Tell Zeriq (Oshri 2000), Abu Zureiq (Garfinkel and Matskevich 2002) and Mishmar HaEmek stratum V (Getzov and Barzilai 2011).

There was also a surface collection survey conducted in 1973 by E. Anati (1973:29-40).

The archaeological work at Ein el-Jarba was renewed in 2013 until 2016 on behalf of the Institute of Archaeology of Hebrew University of Jerusalem, directed by Katharina Streit, in cooperation with the Jezreel Valley Regional Project.

== Findings ==
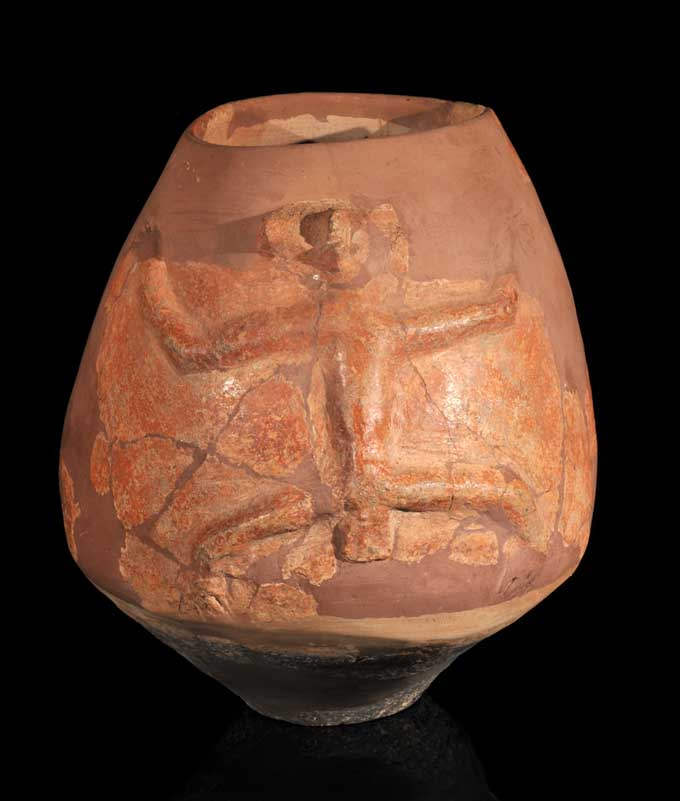
Hole-mouth Jar from Ain al-Jerba site, decorated with reliefs of two sides of a dancing human figures, with deer masks. The Jar was discovered in Jacob Kaplan excavations in 1966.

=== Periods ===
The 2013-2016 excavation uncovered a two-period settlement with remains dating to the Early Bronze Age IB (4th millennium cal BC) and the Early Chalcolithic (6th millennium cal BC).

=== Early Chalcolithic settlement ===
A ca. 65 m^{2} large excavation area at Ein el-Jarba excavated by Kaplan in 1966 yielded four phases of Chalcolithic occupation with architectural remains as well as burials (Arensburg 1970). The stratigraphic accumulation between virgin soil and topsoil was only ca. 1 m (Kaplan 1969: 4).

The Early Chalcolithic phase consists of several floors and decayed mudbrick material, as well as a plastered surface with circular installation. The ceramic assemblage of the Early Chalcolithic phase is dominated by classic Wadi Rabah style pottery.

=== Early Bronze Age settlement ===
The Early Bronze Age remains consist of several substrata of oval houses, as well as living floors, pits and a stone lined silo.

== See also ==
- Archaeology of Israel
