= Yosef Garfinkel =

Israeli archaeologist (born 1956)

- יוסף גרפינקל
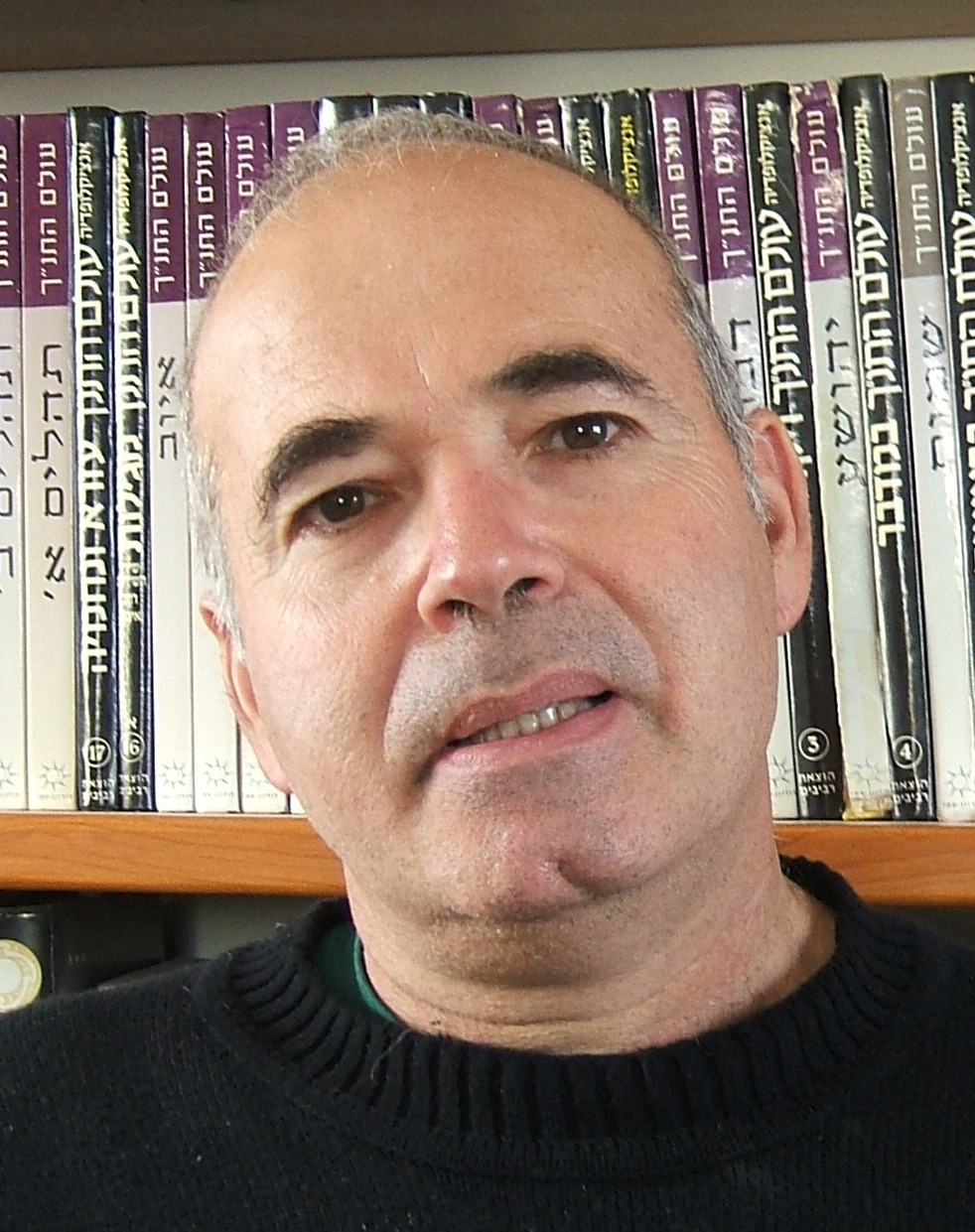
- Born: 1956 (age 69–70); Haifa, Israel
- Alma mater: Hebrew University, Ph.D. (1991)
- Occupation: Professor of Biblical Archaeology
- Years active: 1991–present
- Organization: Hebrew University of Jerusalem
- Known for: Discovery of Khirbet Qeiyafa ostracon

Yosef Garfinkel (Hebrew: יוסף גרפינקל; born 1956) is an Israeli archaeologist and academic. He is a professor of Prehistoric Archaeology and of Archaeology of the Biblical Period at the Hebrew University of Jerusalem.

== Biography ==
Yosef Garfinkel was born in 1956 in Haifa, Israel. He served in the Israel Defense Forces between 1975 and 1978. He studied at Hebrew University, graduating with a Bachelor of Arts (BA) degree in geography and archaeology in 1981, a Master of Arts (MA) degree in prehistory and Biblical archaeology in 1987, and a Doctor of Philosophy (PhD) degree in 1991.

He is a curator of the museum of Yarmukian Culture at Kibbutz Sha'ar HaGolan. Garfinkel specializes in the Protohistoric era of the Near East, the period of time when the world’s earliest village communities were established and the beginning of agriculture took place. He has excavated numerous Neolithic and Chalcolithic sites, including Gesher, Yiftahel, the Neolithic settlement of Tel Ashkelon, Sha'ar HaGolan, Tel ‘Ali and Tel Tsaf. Garfinkel is the author of 34 books and over 180 articles on ancient architecture, farming, water sources, pottery, art, religion and dance.

In 2007, he began conducting excavations at the fortified city of Khirbet Qeiyafa. This site is dated to the early 10th century BC, the period of the biblical King David. In the 2008 season an inscription was discovered written in ink on a pottery shard in a script which is probably Early Alphabetic/Proto Phoenician. This might be the earliest Hebrew inscription ever found, although the actual language of the inscription is still under debate.

== Excavations ==
- Tel Lachish
- Khirbet Qeiyafa
- Tel Tsaf: 2004 (preliminary survey), 2006 (first season)
- Sha'ar HaGolan
- Yiftahel
- Neolithic Ashkelon
- Gesher

== Partial Bibliography ==
- Y. Garfinkel. 1992. The Pottery Assemblages of Sha'ar HaGolan and Rabah Stages from Munhata (Israel). Paris: Association Paléorient.
- Y. Garfinkel. 1995. Human and Animal Figurines of Munhata, Israel. Paris: Association Paléorient.
- Y. Garfinkel. 1999. Neolithic and Chalcolithic Pottery of the Southern Levant. (Qedem 39). Jerusalem: Institute of Archaeology, Hebrew University.
- Y. Garfinkel, and M. Miller. 2002. Sha'ar HaGolan Vol 1. Neolithic Art in Context. Oxford: Oxbow.
- Y. Garfinkel. 2003. Dance at the Dawn of Agriculture. Austin: Texas University Press.
- Y. Garfinkel. 2004. The Goddess of Sha'ar HaGolan. Excavations at a Neolithic Site in Israel. Jerusalem: Israel Exploration Society.
- Y. Garfinkel and D. Dag. 2006. Gesher: A Pre-Pottery Neolithic A Site in the Central Jordan Valley, Israel. A Final Report. Berlin: Ex Oriente.
- Y. Garfinkel and S. Cohen. 2007. The Early Middle Bronze Cemetery of Gesher. Final Excavation Report. AASOR 62. Boston: American Schools of Oriental Research.
- Y. Garfinkel and D. Dag. 2008 Neolithic Ashkelon. (Qedem 47). Jerusalem: Institute of Archaeology, Hebrew University.
- O. Bar-Yosef and Y. Garfinkel. 2008. The Prehistory of Israel. Human Cultures before Writing. Jerusalem: Ariel (Hebrew).
- Garfinkel, Yosef; Ganor, Saar; Hasel, Michael (2018). In the Footsteps of King David: Revelations from an Ancient Biblical City (first ed.). Thames & Hudson. ISBN 978-0-500-05201-3.
- Yosef Garfinkel. 2024. Colonial Archaeology in Palestine in the 1930s: The First Expedition to Lachish. Israel Exploration Society. ISBM 978-965-221-133-0.
