= Tel Ali =

Archeological site in israel

Coordinates: 32°42′2.19″N 35°33′35.68″E

Tel Ali is an archaeological site located one mile south of the Sea of Galilee, in the central Jordan Valley, Israel. It has been excavated twice. First, during the years 1955–1959, Moshe Prausnitz conducted salvage excavations on behalf of the Israel Department of Antiquities. He published only preliminary reports and most of the excavation finds remained unstudied. Prausnitz uncovered a detailed sequence of occupation including: Pre-Pottery Neolithic B, Pre-Pottery Neolithic C, Pottery Neolithic B (Wadi Rabah), Middle Chalcolithic (Beth-Shean XVIII) and Late Chalcolithic (Ghassulian). However, at the time of excavation many of these phases had not yet been defined.

The picture at Tel Ali became clearer only after Yosef Garfinkel's excavations in 1989–1990. Two excavation areas were opened and 300 m^{2} (3,200 sq ft) were uncovered. Tel Ali contributes to the understanding of the Neolithic and Chalcolithic periods in a variety of ways:

1. Very few sites in the southern Levant present such a long settlement history
2. It was occupied during the Pre-Pottery Neolithic C (PPNC) period, a phase not recognized in the earlier days of research
3. It was occupied during the Middle Chalcolithic period. This cultural horizon is known in the Jordan Valley from a number of small assemblages: Beth-Shean XVIII, Tel Tsaf, Tell esh-Shunah, Tell Abu Habil, and Abu Hamid.

== Bibliography ==
- M. Prausnitz. 1971. From Hunter to Farmer and Trader. Jerusalem: Sivan Press.
- Y. Garfinkel. 1994. The ‘PPNC’ Flint Assemblage from Tel ‘Ali. In H.G. Gebel and St.K. Kozlowski, eds. Neolithic Chipped Stone Industries of the Fertile Crescent, pp. 543–562. Studies in Early Near Eastern Production, Subsistence and Environment 1. Berlin: Ex Orient. ISBN 3-9804241-2-X.
- Y. Garfinkel. 1999. Neolithic and Chalcolithic Pottery of the Southern Levant. Qedem 39, Institute of Archaeology, Hebrew University of Jerusalem.
