= Mudbrick =

Earth blocks for construction

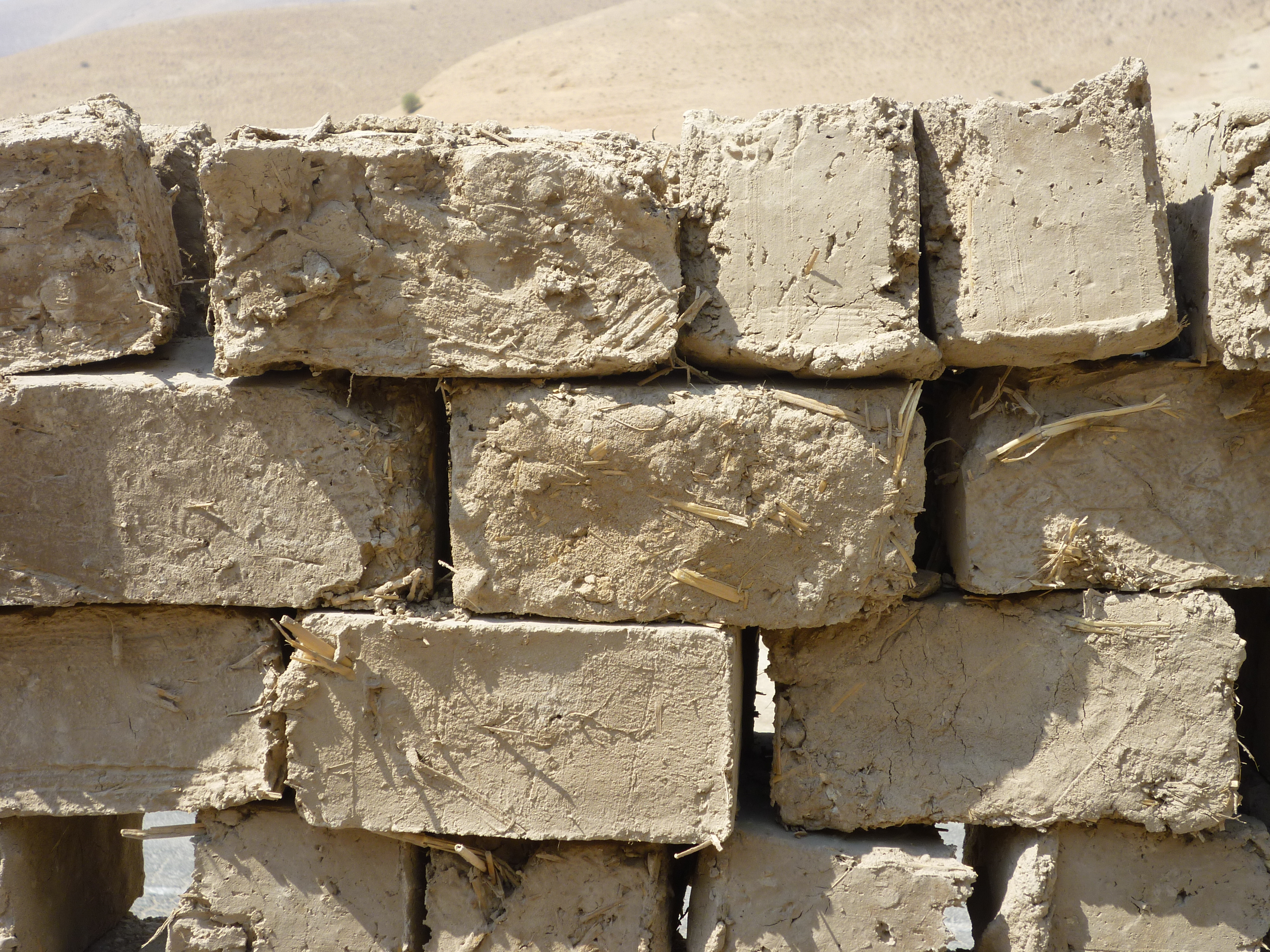
New, unlaid mudbricks in the Jordan Valley, West Bank Palestine, 2011

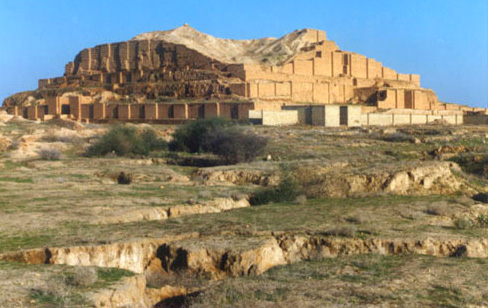
Mudbrick was used for the construction of Elamite ziggurats—some of the world's largest and oldest constructions. Choqa Zanbil, a 13th-century BCE ziggurat in Iran, is similarly constructed from clay bricks combined with burnt bricks.

A mudbrick (or mud-brick), also called an unfired brick, is an air-dried brick composed of a mixture of mud (containing loam, clay, sand, and water) with a binding material, such as rice husks or straw. Mudbricks are known to have been used since 9000 BCE.

From around 5000–4000 BCE, mudbricks evolved into fired bricks to increase strength and durability. Nevertheless, in some warm regions with very little timber available to fuel a kiln, mudbricks continued to be in use. Mudbricks remain the modern standard of vernacular architecture in some warmer regions, mainly in parts of Africa and western Asia. In the 20th century, the compressed earth block was developed using high pressure as a cheap and eco-friendly alternative to obtain non-fired bricks with more strength than the simpler air-dried mudbricks.

== Ancient world ==
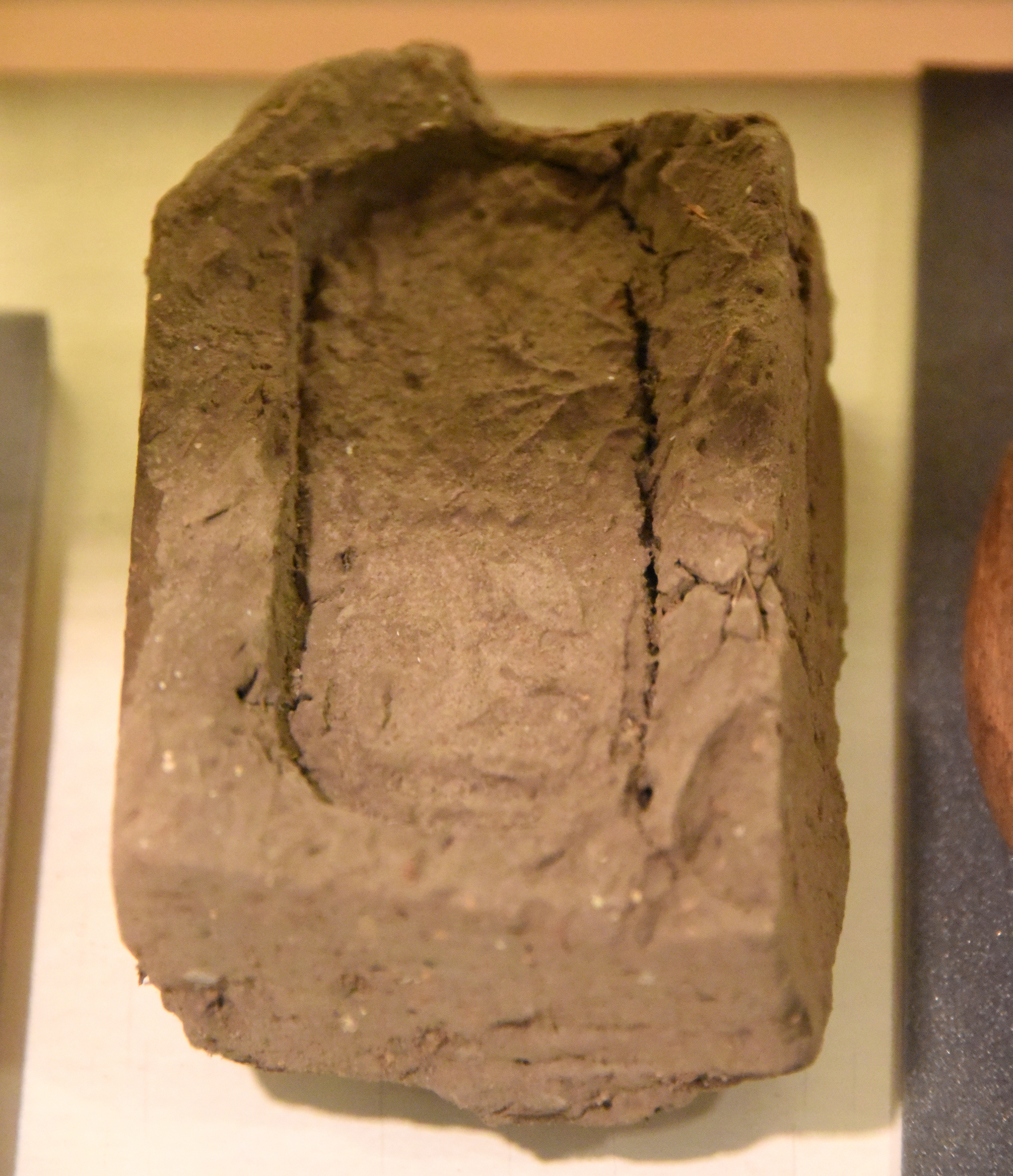
Mud-brick stamped with seal impression of raised relief of the Treasury of the Vizier. From Lahun, Fayum, Egypt. 12th Dynasty. The Petrie Museum of Egyptian Archaeology, London

The history of mudbrick production and construction in the southern Levant may be dated as far back as the Pre-Pottery Neolithic A (e.g., PPNA Jericho). These sun dried mudbricks, also known as adobe or just mudbrick, were made from a mixture of sand, clay, water, frequently tempered with chopped straw and chaff branches, and were the most common material for constructing earthen buildings throughout the ancient Near East for millennia. Unfired mudbrick is still made throughout the world, using both modern and traditional methods.

The 9000 BCE dwellings of Jericho were constructed from mudbricks, affixed with mud, as were those at numerous sites across the Levant over the following millennia. Well-preserved mudbricks from a site at Tel Tsaf, in the Jordan Valley, have been dated to 5200 BCE, though there is no evidence that this site was the first to use the technology. Evidence suggests that the mudbrick composition at Tel Tsaf was stable for at least 500 years, throughout the middle Chalcolithic period.

The South Asian inhabitants of Mehrgarh constructed and lived in mudbrick houses between 7000 and 3300 BCE. Mudbricks were used at more than 15 reported sites attributed to the 3rd millennium BCE in the ancient Indus Valley civilization. In the Mature Harappan phase, fired bricks were used.

The Mesopotamians used sun-dried bricks in their city construction; typically these bricks were flat on the bottom and curved on the top, called plano-convex mudbricks. Some were formed in a square mould and rounded so that the middle was thicker than the ends. Some walls had a few courses of fired bricks from their bases up to the splash line to extend the life of the building.

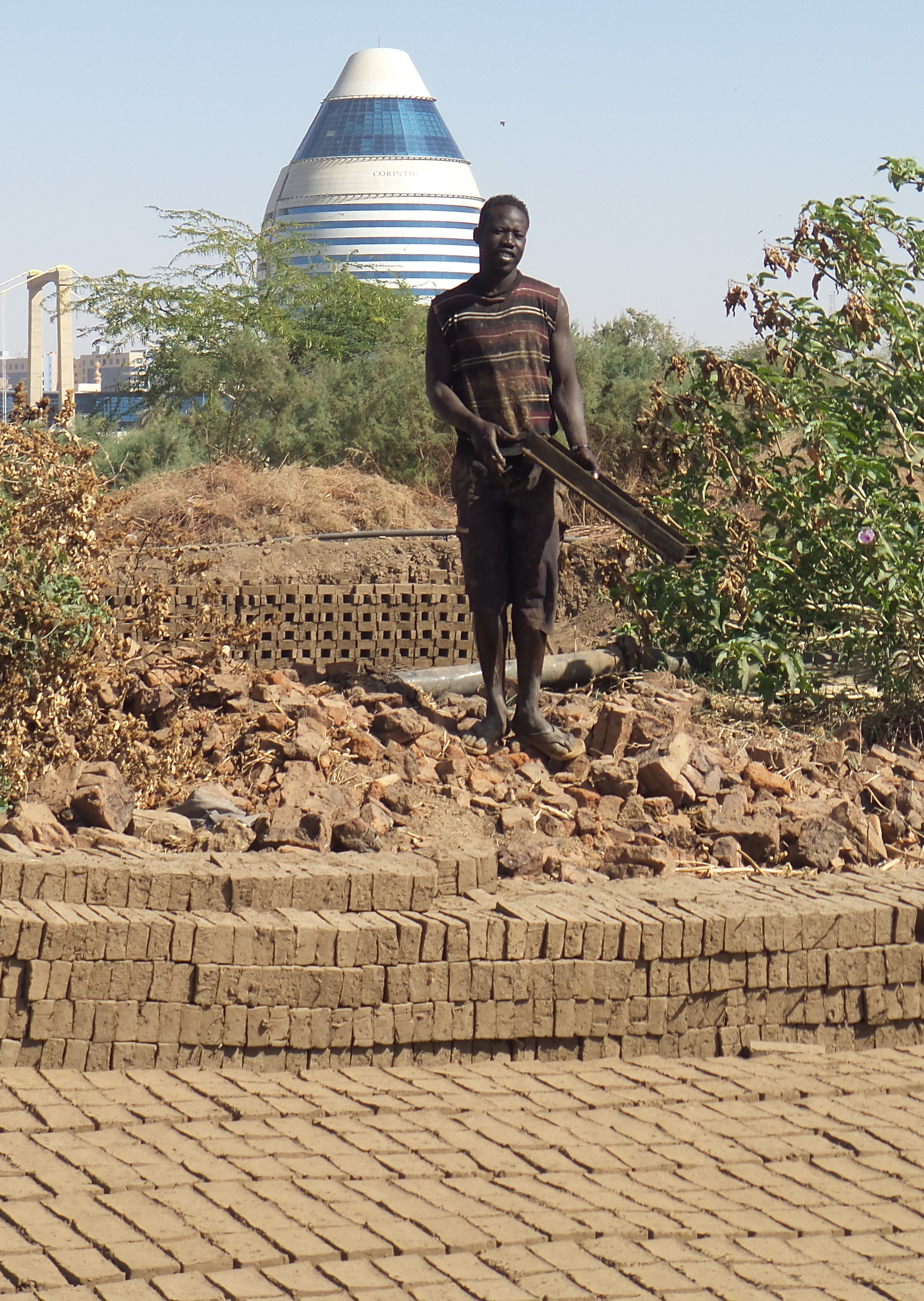
Traditional brickyard on Tuti Island in Sudan, 2016

In Minoan Crete, at the Knossos site, there is archaeological evidence that sun-dried bricks were used in the Neolithic period (prior to 3400 BCE).

Sun-dried mudbricks were the most common construction material employed in ancient Egypt during pharaonic times and were made in pretty much the same way for millennia. Mud from some locations required sand, chopped straw, or other binders such as animal dung to be mixed in with the mud to increase durability and plasticity. Workers gathered mud from the Nile river and poured it into a pit. Workers then tramped on the mud while straw was added to solidify the mold. The mudbricks were chemically suitable as fertilizer, leading to the destruction of many ancient Egyptian ruins, such as at Edfu; one well-preserved site is Amarna. Mudbrick was reused by the Ancirent Egyptians to build many buildings because they had a lack of trees and other building materials. Mudbrick use increased during the time of Roman influence.

In the Ancient Greek world, mudbrick was commonly used for the building of walls, fortifications and citadels, such as the walls of the Citadel of Troy (Troy II). These mudbricks were often made with straw or dried vegetable matter.

== Adobe ==
In areas of Spanish influence, mudbrick construction is called adobe, and developed over time into a complete system of wall protection, flat roofing and finishes which in modern English usage is often referred to as "adobe style", regardless of the construction method.

== Banco ==
The Great Mosque of Djenné, in central Mali, is the world's largest mudbrick structure. It, like much of Sahelian architecture, is built with a mudbrick called Banco, a recipe of mud and grain husks, fermented, and either formed into bricks or applied on surfaces as a plaster like paste in broad strokes. This plaster must be reapplied annually.

== Durability ==
In some cases, brickmakers extended the life of mudbricks by putting fired bricks on top or covering them with stucco.

== Mudbrick architecture worldwide ==
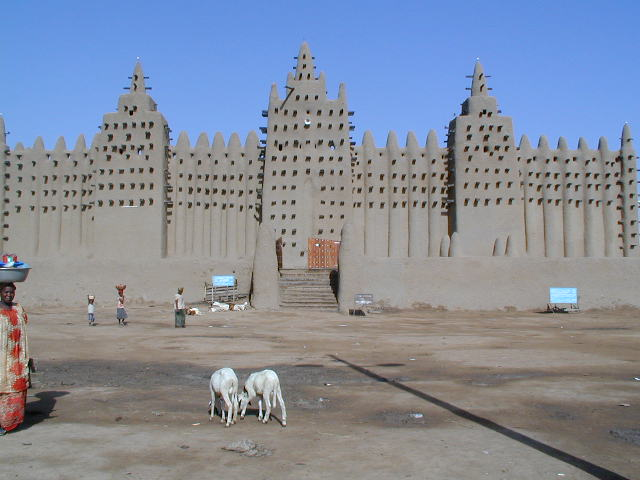
The Grand Mosque of Djenné, as reconstructed in 1907, is the largest mudbrick structure in the world.

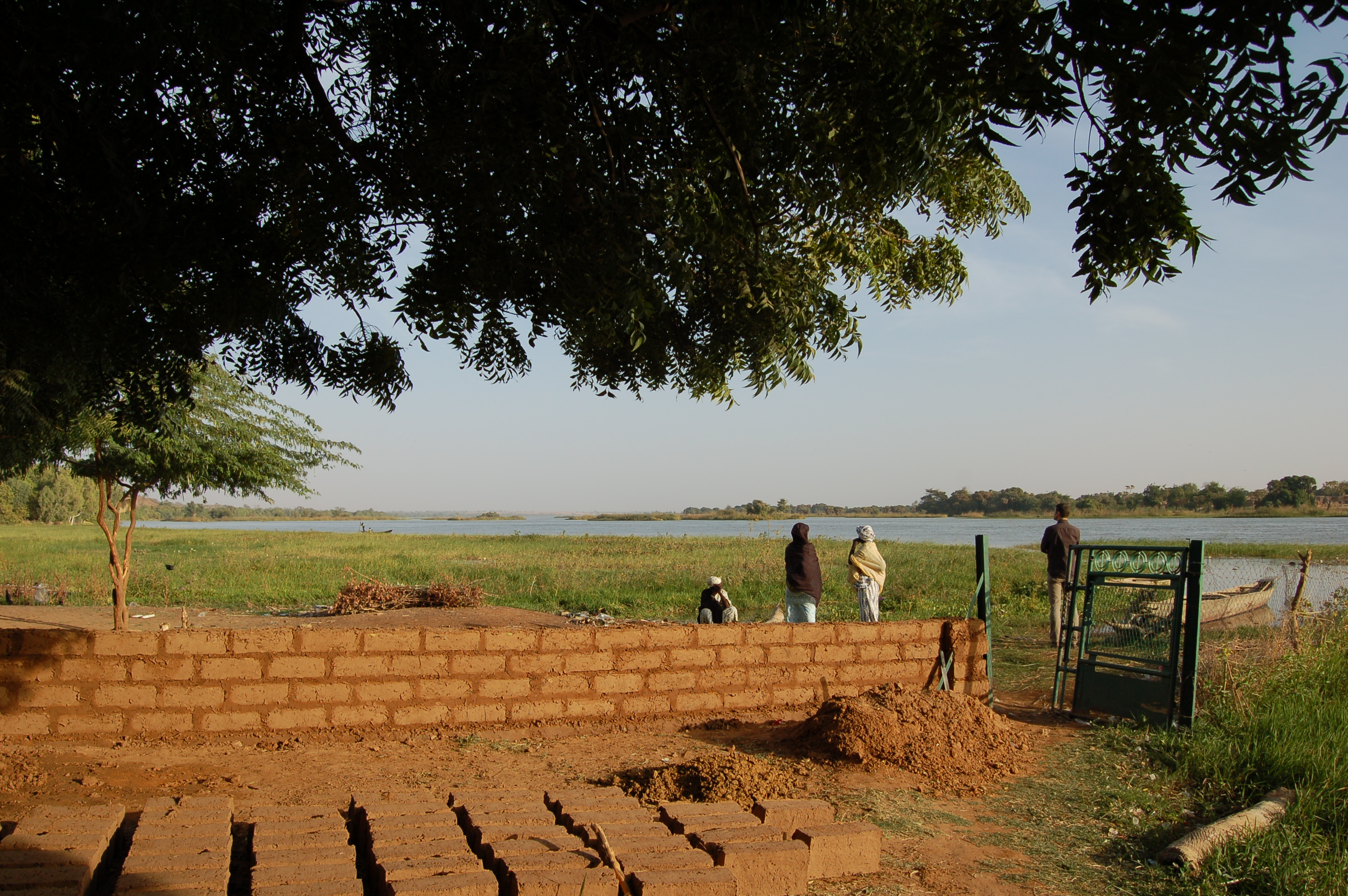
Production of mudbricks for construction in Niger, 2007

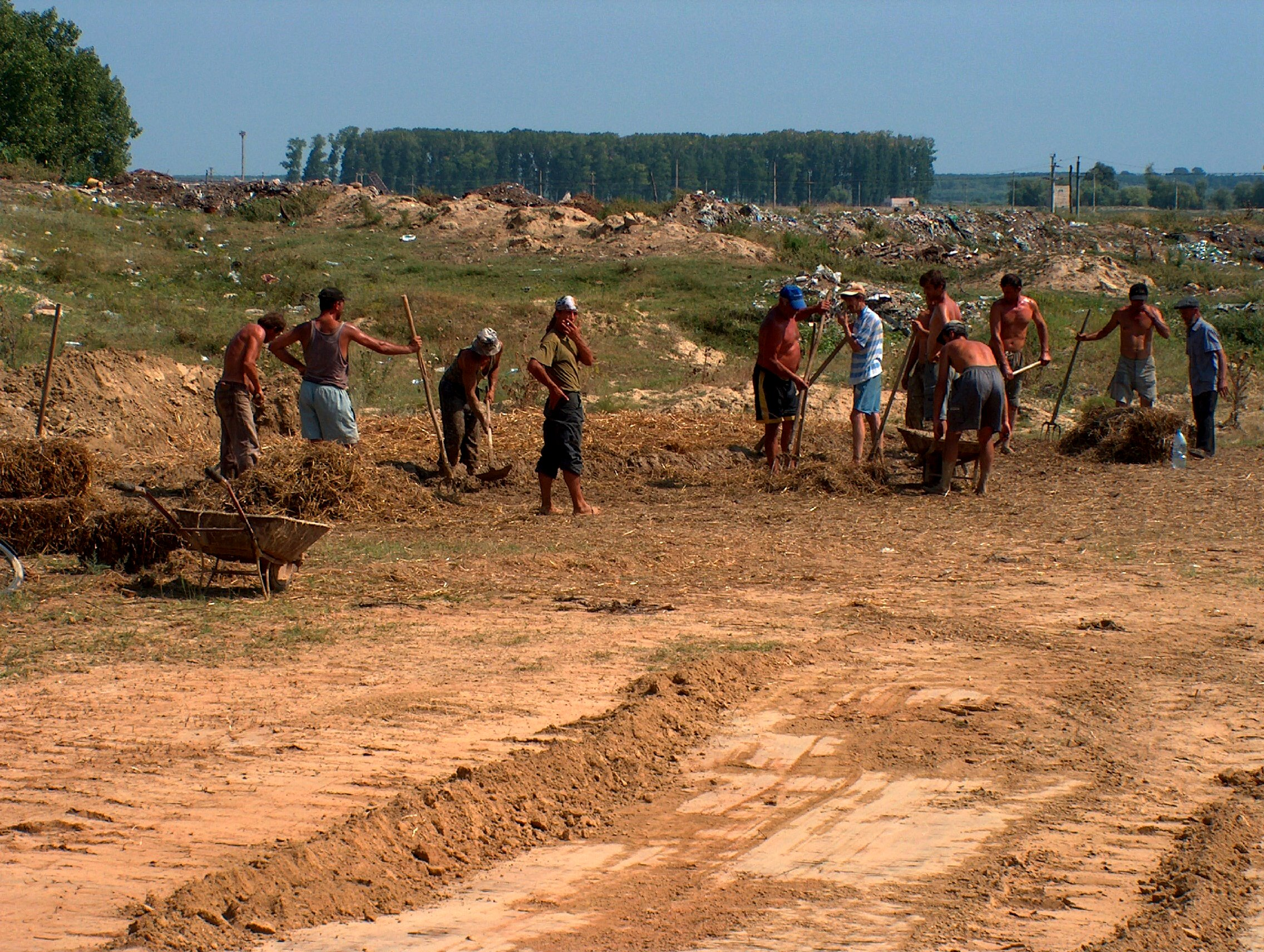
Mudbrick is still used, as seen in 2003 in the Romania Danube River Delta.

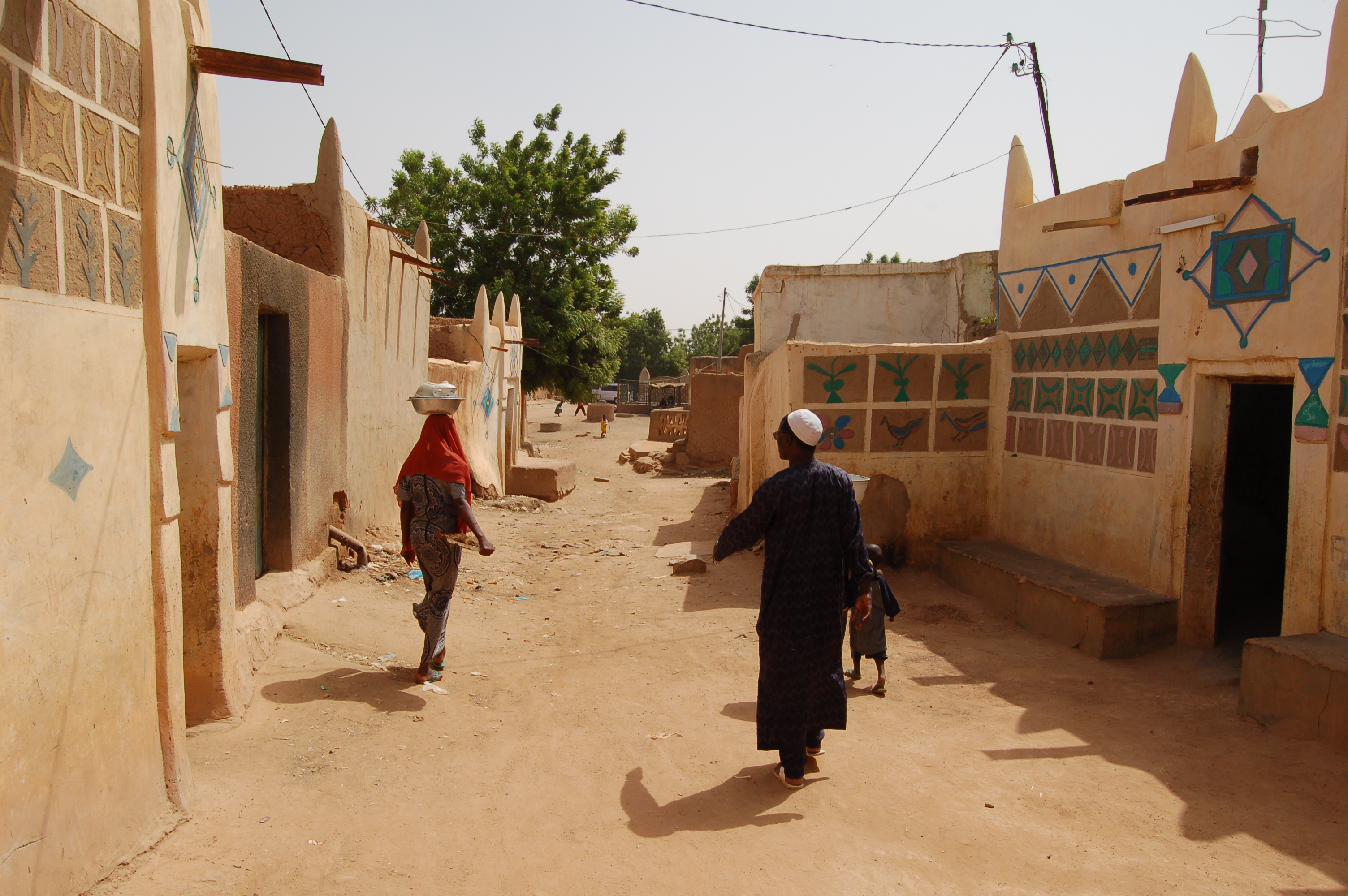
The "Old Town" area of Zinder, Niger, with traditional painted mudbrick buildings, 2007

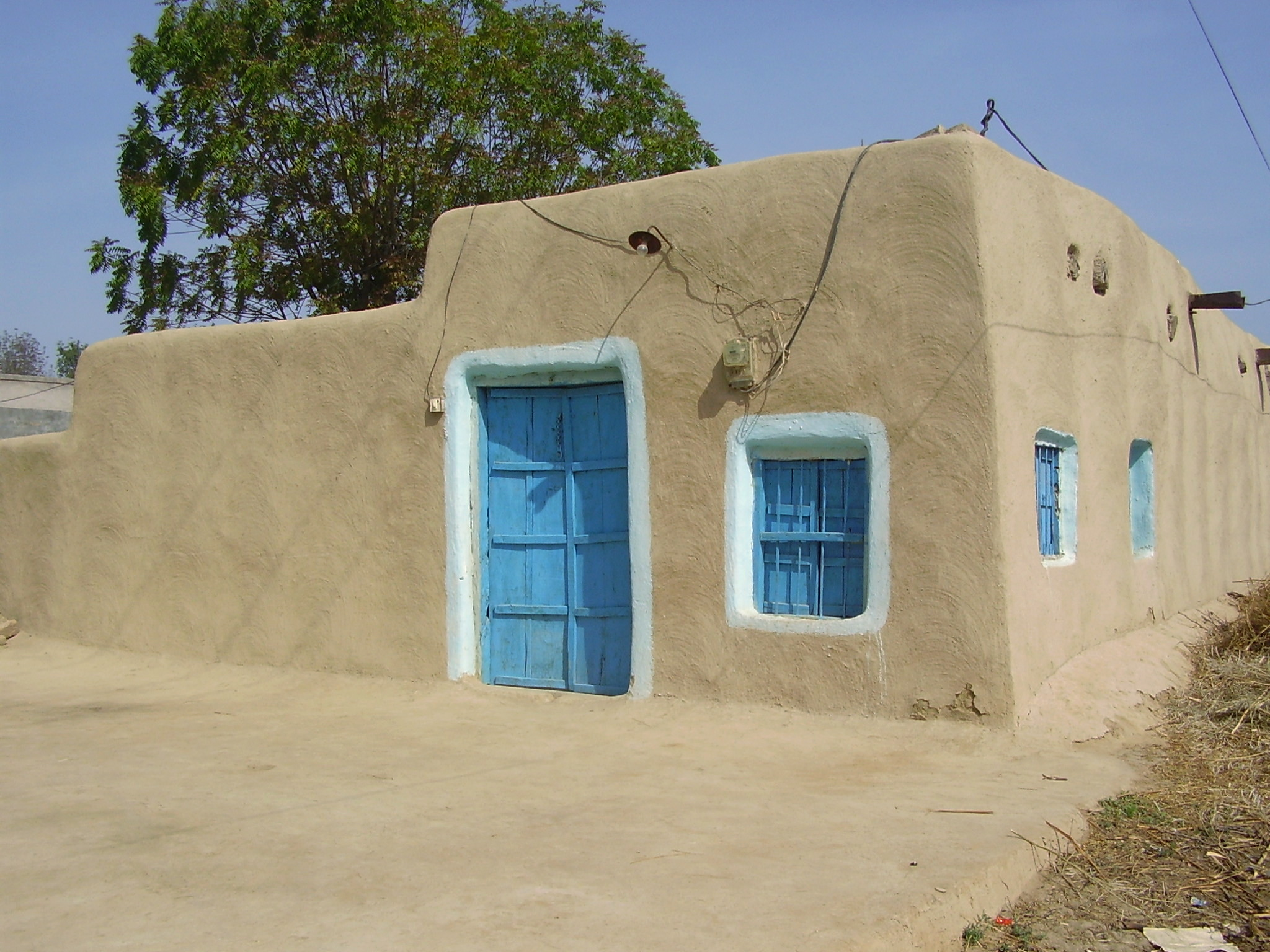
A Punjabi mudbrick home in Pakistan, 2009

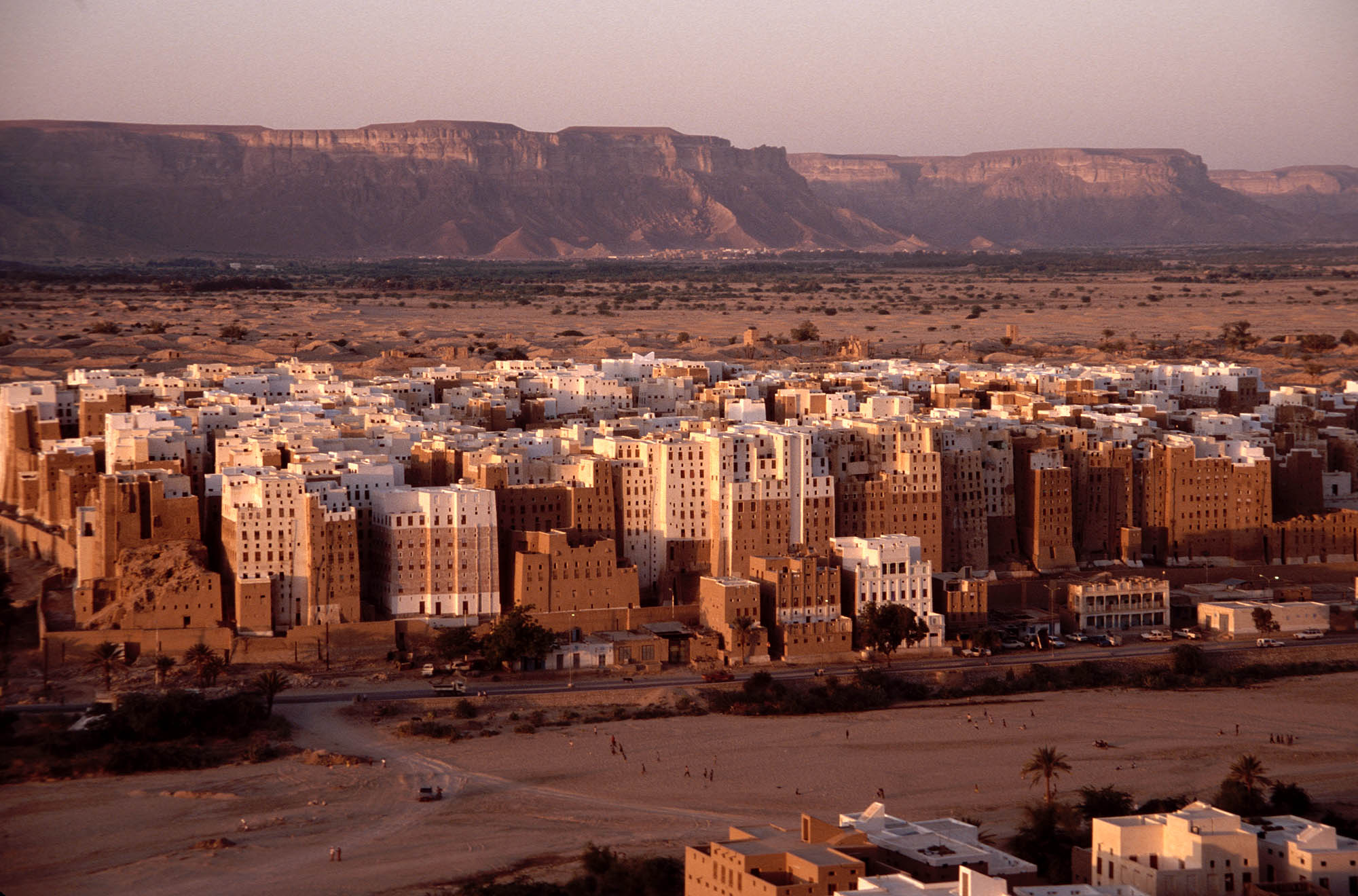
Mudbrick high-rises in Shibam, Yemen, 1999

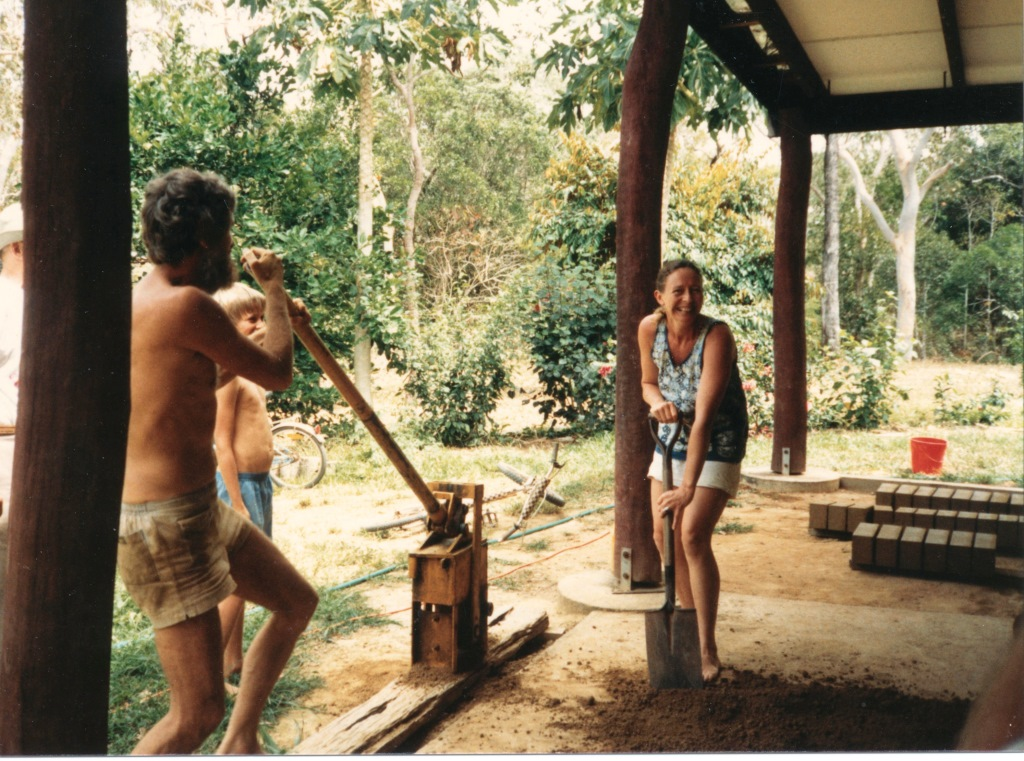
Making mudbricks near Cooktown, Australia, 1988

== See also ==
- Cob – Building material made of soil and fiber
- Earth structure – Building or other structure made largely from soil
- Rammed earth – Construction material of damp subsoil
- Sod house – Turf house used in early colonial North America
