= Atlit Yam =

Submerged neolithic settlement in Israel

- הכפר הנאוליתי בעתלית-ים (Hebrew)
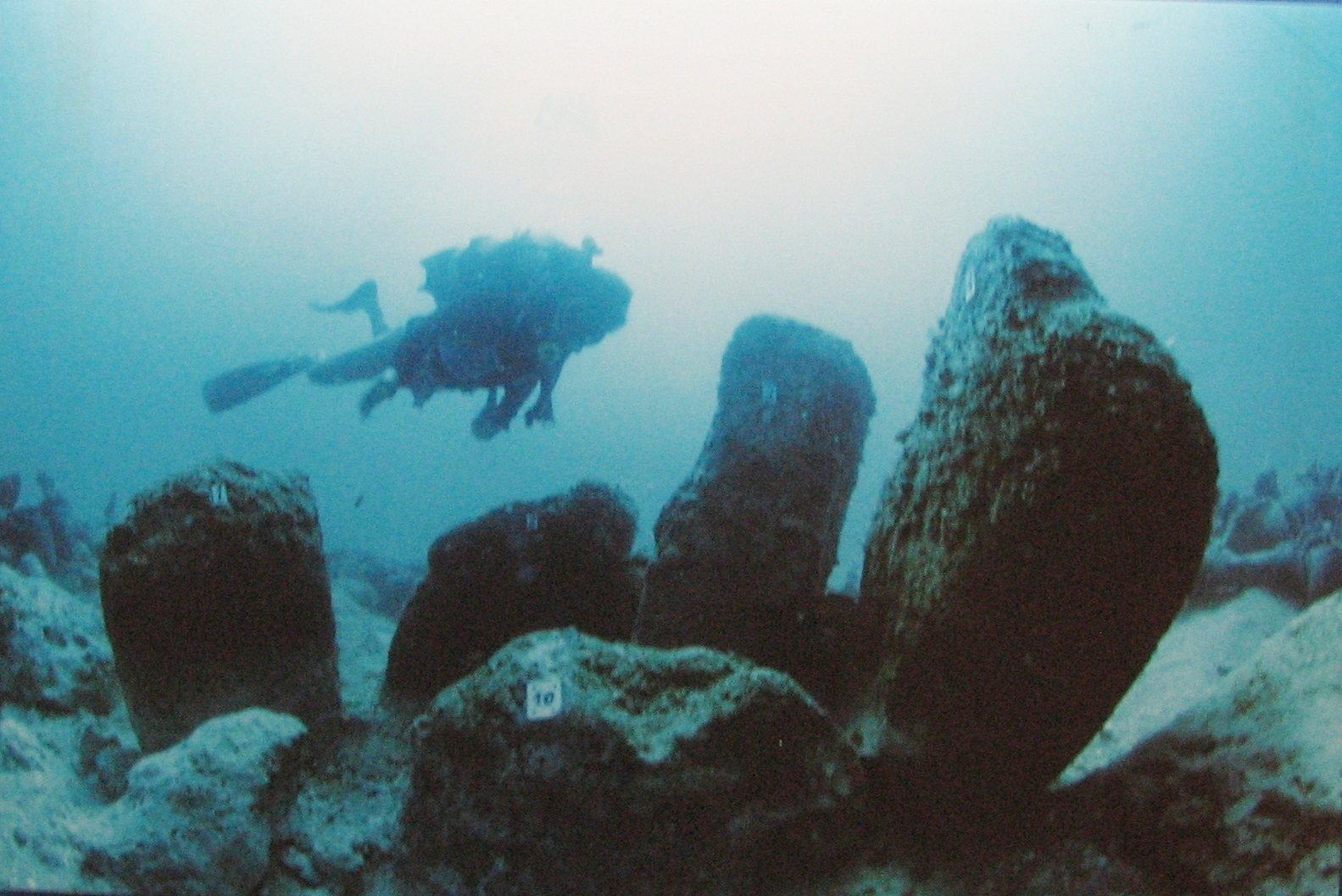
- Submerged stone structure

- Location off the coast of Haifa District, Israel
- 32°42′38.98″N 34°56′6.54″E
- Type: Settlement
- Periods: Pre-Pottery Neolithic B
- Location: Off the coast of Atlit, Israel
- Region: Eastern Mediterranean Sea

History
- Built: 6900 BCE
- Abandoned: 6300 BCE

Site notes
- Area: 6 hectares (15 acres)

Atlit Yam (Hebrew: עתלית ים) is a submerged Pre Pottery Neolithic C (PPNC) archaeological site located 300–400 meters off the coast of Atlit, Israel. Dating from the late 7th to the early 6th millennia BCE, Atlit Yam provides the earliest known evidence for a community relying on pastoralism, agriculture, and fishing as subsistence systems on the Levantine coast. As of 2004, it is the only marine archaeological site in the Mediterranean to contain in situ human burials.

== Location ==
Atlit Yam once sat on a coastal peninsula in close vicinity to the Oren River as well as several fresh water springs. The beginning of the Holocene saw a rise in sea levels which left the site completely submerged by approximately 7000 BP. The contemporary coastline is assumed to have been about 1 kilometre (0.6 mi) west of the present coast. It is currently 8–12 metres (30–40 ft) beneath sea level in the Mediterranean Sea, in the Bay of Atlit, at the mouth of the Oren river on the Carmel coast. The site covers an estimated 6 hectares (15 acres).

== Archaeological findings ==
The Pre-Yarmukian site has been radiocarbon dated to 8100-7900 BP from charcoal and seed samples. Submerged settlements and shipwrecks have been found on the Carmel coast since 1960, in the wake of large-scale sand quarrying. In 1984, marine archaeologist Ehud Galili spotted ancient remains while surveying the area for shipwrecks.

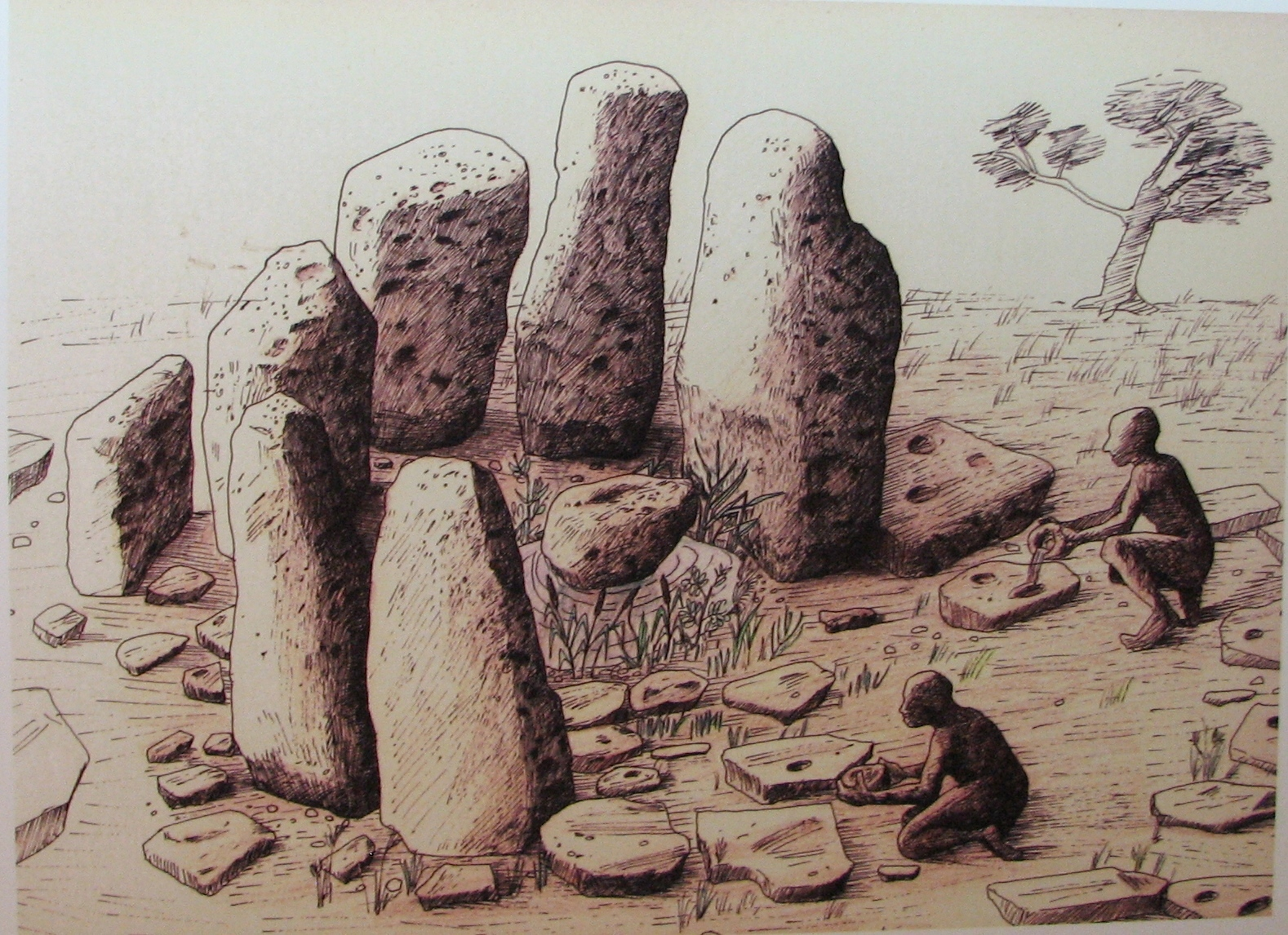
Atlit-Yam, Ritual structure made of stones, artist's reconstruction

=== Structural features ===
The foundations of several rectangular walls made of stone and clay bricks have been excavated, some of which contained hearths and "round installations" which are suggested to have served as food niches. A well constructed of dry-stone walling, with a diameter of 1.5 m (4 ft 11 in) and a depth of 5.5 m (18 ft), contained four distinct levels of use. The upper two layers (from 250–0 cm) contained an excess of faunal and botanical remains as well as small stones and shells, thus suggesting the well's use as a refuse pit after rising sea levels resulted in the salinization of the well water. Galili believes that this contamination eventually forced the inhabitants of Atlit Yam to abandon their homes.

A stone semicircle, containing seven 600 kg (1,300 lb) megaliths, has been found. The stones have cup marks carved into them and are arranged around a freshwater spring, which suggests that they may have been used for a water ritual.

=== Artifacts ===
A majority of the lithic assemblage consisted of projectile points, bifaces, axes, and sickle blades. While several types of chert were present in the assemblage, they were all quarried from the Mount Carmel region, approximately 4 km to the east. Out of the 155 lithic tools collected, a majority were recovered on the surface of the sea floor. Also recovered were several mortars and bowls made of kurkar and limestone.

Some of the bone artifacts recovered from Atlit Yam include a drilled needle, fishing hooks, projectile points, awls, and ornaments carved with unidentified animals or geometric designs.

=== Faunal remains ===
The faunal assemblage consists of approximately 322 identifiable bones and another 177 which remain unidentified. The minimum number of individuals (MNI) as calculated by the osteological frequency of faunal remains indicate that goat remains take up over half of the assemblage, followed by cattle and swine. Morphologically, the goat and cattle remains are consistent with non-domesticated species. This indicates that the community of Atlit Yam most likely practiced incipient domestication, characterized by the isolation of a group from a wild herd without the selective interference of choice breeding.

Over 6,000 fish remains have been recovered from Atlit Yam. Approximately 92% of the identifiable species consisted of the Gray triggerfish (Balistes carolinensis). 34 grouper (Serranidae) remains were recovered from a single feature (L10A). 32 drum (Sciaenidae) remains were also recovered from L10A. It has been disputed as to whether or not the fish remains accumulated due to human activity or simply over time, but the pristine condition of both the bones and scales is indicative of their deposition prior to the rising of the sea levels.

=== Floral remains ===
An estimated 26,000 grains of charred emmer and naked wheats were recovered in a pit near structure 10, being the largest contemporaneous deposit of its type in the region. Charcoal remains have been analyzed to be those of olive, carob, oak, aphylla, and date trees. Similarly, waterlogged seeds of fig, grape, lentil, and almond were also recovered. Granary weevils indicate the presence of stored grain. Pollen analysis and the remains of marsh plants indicates the local presence of swamps.

A single seed of Styrax officinalis was recovered from a well. These seeds have commonly been used as fish poison in the region for hundreds of years, suggesting that the inhabitants of Atlit Yam did so likewise.

=== Human remains ===
At least 90 human burials, a majority of which were interred either close to or within dwellings, have been recovered at Atlit Yam. Most were in situ, but few consisted of disarticulated remains which are suggested to have been secondary burials. The individuals were buried in a flexed position typical of those found within pre-pottery Neolithic sites in the region. Two of the burials are children under the age of fifteen, one is aged between 14 and 20 years, four between the ages of 20–30, and four whose ages cannot be determined. The skeletons of a woman and child, found in 2008, have revealed the earliest known cases of tuberculosis.

==== Health ====
The buried individuals of Atlit Yam display many signs of poor health, including auditory exotosis, which is a common occurrence when spending extended time cold water diving. Dental attrition, caused by excessive tooth-on-tooth wear, could be indicative of rope or cord maneuvering with fishing. Elbow wear is similarly common, as seen with extensive rowing. A single individual (Burial 13E) displayed signs of tuberculosis, a wrist fracture, dental attrition, prolonged high fever, and epilepsy. Excavated by the University of Haifa on October 1, 1987, resulted in the recovery of a complete human burial, in an excellent state of preservation. She was discovered under 10 metres (33 ft) of water, with the skeleton oriented in a flexed position and laid on her right side. Subsequent carbon dating of plant material recovered from the burial placed the age of the site at 8000 +/−200 years.

The Homo I skeleton showed traits similar to Natufian populations, but had its own unique morphologic structure, which evidenced inbreeding in the community. The researchers emphasized that one skeleton is not an adequate sample on which to base conclusions. Inland and coastal groups present different types of economical and cultural adaptations to their environment.

== Significance ==
Piles of fish ready for trade or storage have led scientists to conclude that the village was abandoned suddenly. An Italian study led by Maria Pareschi of the Italian National Institute of Geophysics and Volcanology in Pisa indicates that a volcanic collapse of the eastern flank of Mount Etna 8,500 years ago would likely have caused a 10-storey 40 m (130 ft) tsunami to engulf some Mediterranean coastal cities within hours. Some scientists point to the apparent abandonment of Atlit Yam around the same time as further evidence that indeed, such a tsunami did occur.

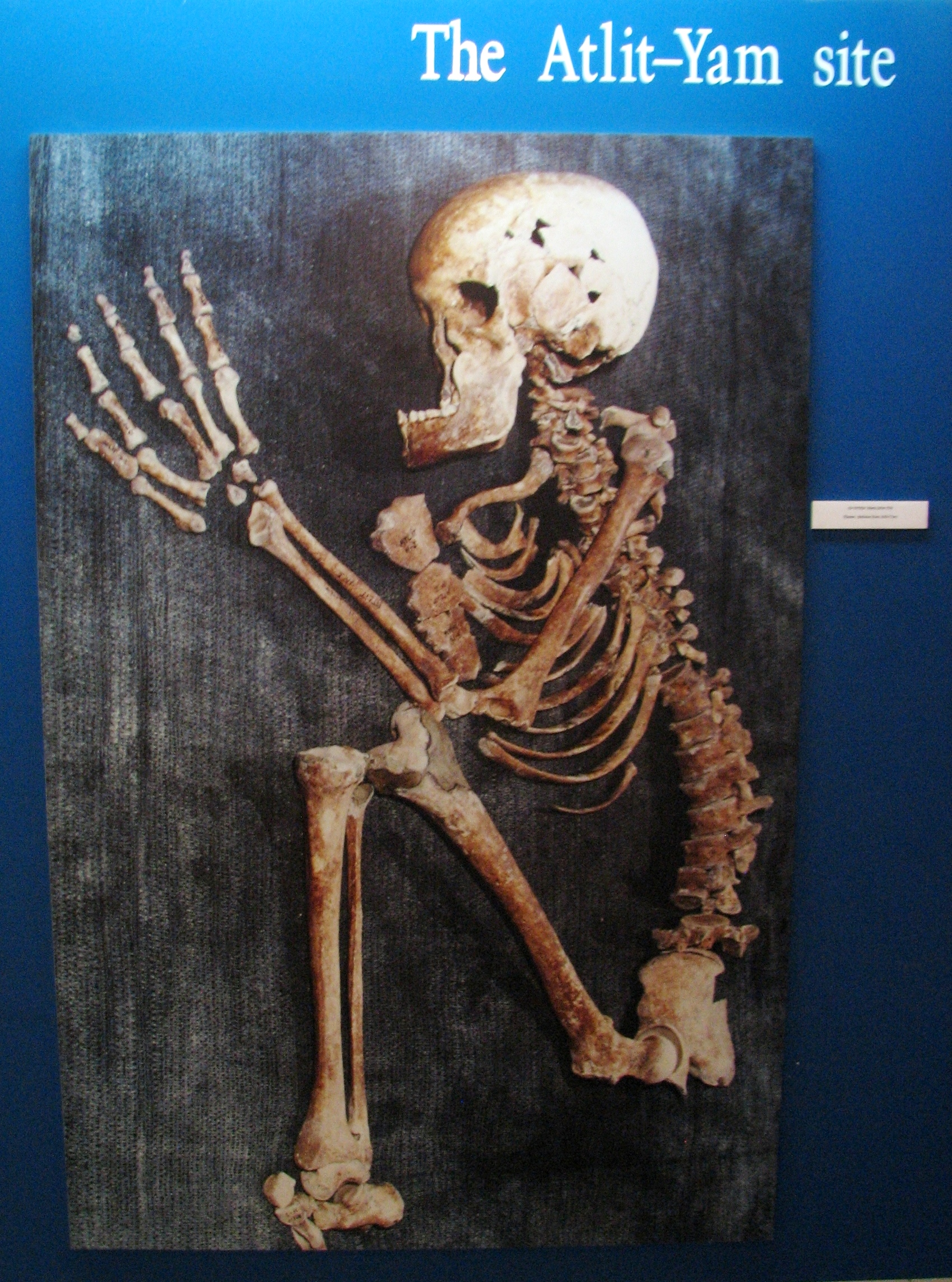
Human skeleton in flexed position, discovered at Atlit Yam

=== Radiocarbon dating ===
The settlement has been dated by three radiocarbon dates from submerged branches:

| Lab-number | BP | date (approx.) | deviation |
|---|---|---|---|
| RT-2477/8 | 7605 | 6460 BC | 55 |
| RT-2479 | 7460 | 6270–6390 BC | 55 |
| RT-2489 | 7880 | 6660–6700 BC | 55 |
