= Munhata =

Archaeological site in Israel

- חורבת מנחה (Hebrew)
- Horvat Minha, Khirbet Munhata
- Location within Israel
- 32.607°N 35.551°E
- Type: Tell
- Cultures: PPNB, Neolithic, Chalcolithic
- Location: Israel

History
- Built: ca. 8300 BC
- Abandoned: ca. 3400 BC

Site notes
- Excavation dates: 1962-1963
- Archaeologists: Jean Perrot
- Public access: yes

Munhata (Horvat Minha or Khirbet Munhata) is an archaeological site 11 kilometres (6.8 mi) south of Sea of Galilee, Israel on the north bank and near the outlet of Nahal Tavor (Tabor Stream) on a terrace 215 metres (705 ft) below sea level.

== Excavations ==
The area of 2,000 square metres (22,000 ft^{2}) in the Jordan Valley was first excavated in 1962 by Jean Perrot. The deposits on site were 3 metres (9.8 ft) deep and divided up into six distinct layers of occupation. These have been divided into PPNB aceramic during levels six to three, with later Neolithic and Early Chalcolithic (Yarmukian and Wadi Rabah) cultures in levels two and one. The scientific archives of the archaeological excavations of Munhata are deposited at the Archives Center of the Maison des Sciences de l’homme Mondes (CNRS, France).

== Construction ==
Buildings in the earlier stages had stone, paved or plastered floors made of mud bricks on stone foundations with remains of hearths and other stone structures. The north walls of buildings contained a plastered niche, a feature found in a similar room in Jericho. The PPNB levels also revealed an unusual circular courtyard structure with rooms radiating out from it and a large platform with channels cut in it associated with a pebble lined trough, presumably used for craft purposes. The Yarmoukian phase continued with round buildings which developed into rectangular ones in the Rabah phase. A major break in settlement was detected between levels three and two, where the early levels were covered over with sandy soil.

== Culture ==
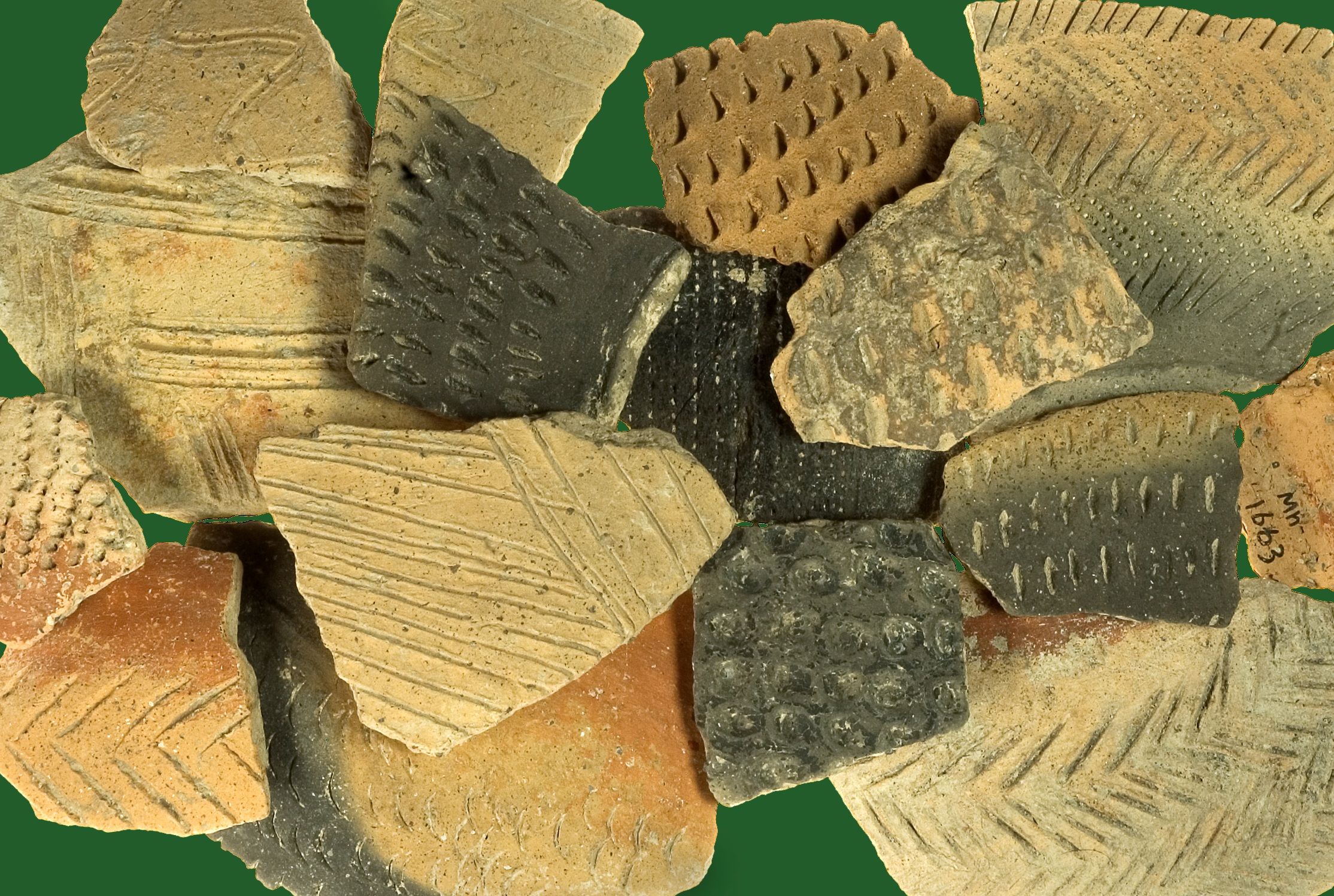
Early Chalcolithic pottery from Munhata

Various flint tools and arrowheads were recovered from the site. Arrowheads had distinctive tangs (some barbed) with wings and pointed shoulders, some were diamond or leaf shaped and a few were notched. Finely denticulated sickle blades were found in large numbers with other tools including end scrapers, blades, burins and borers. One piece of obsidian was found in level six that originated from the same place as a piece from El Khiam. Grinding tools were also found including pestle and mortars of basalt or limestone, polishers, rubbers and grooved stones. Stoneware vessels were found along with a few greenstone beads. The site was also notable for finds of clay figurines of males, females and animals.

== Dating ==
Radio-carbon dating of the site had large stated errors due to problematic dating materials but gave dates between ca. 7210 and 5420 BC. These provide a vague suggestion of the age of the site. Typological comparisons have been made of various artifacts highlighting a certain regional variation with more elaborate design arrowheads and less pressure flaking. This equates generally with the PPNB stages of Jericho and Beidha suggesting that occupations overlapped with these sites and a date of occupation during the middle and late 7th millennium BC.
