= Yarmukian culture =

Late Neolithic archaeological culture of the Southern Levant

- Map showing the region of Sha'ar HaGolan, type site of the Yarmukian culture.
- Geographical range: Levant
- Period: Late Neolithic
- Dates: 6400–6000 BC
- Type site: Sha'ar HaGolan, Israel
- Major sites: Tel Tsaf
- Preceded by: Khiamian
- Followed by: Wadi Rabah

Map of the Yarmukian culture and other Pottery Neolithic cultures in the Southern Levant. Yarmukian culture Lodian (Jericho IX) culture Nizzanim culture

The Yarmukian culture was a Pottery Neolithic A (PNA) culture of the ancient Levant. It was the first culture in prehistoric Syria and one of the oldest in the Levant to make use of pottery. The Yarmukian derives its name from the Yarmuk River, which flows near its type site of Sha'ar Hagolan at the foot of the Golan Heights. This culture existed alongside the Lodian, or Jericho IX culture and the Nizzanim culture to the south.

== Recent theory ==
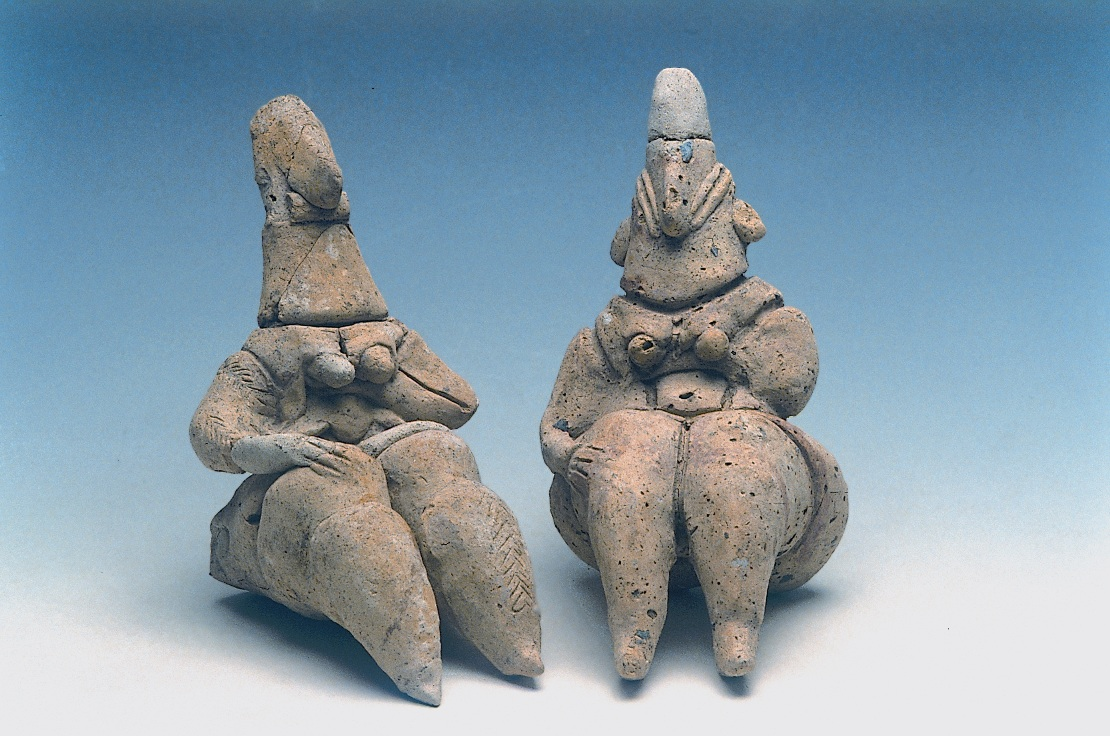
Shaar Hagolan figurines

In 2015, a salvage excavation brought to light a prehistoric site near Beit Hilkia and the Revivim quarry, with findings from the Yarmukian, Late Chalcolithic, and the Middle Bronze Age IIA–IIB. Somewhat surprising was the discovery of a typical Yarmukian-style fired clay figurine of a fertility goddess, the southernmost such finding.

Of 163 sites found up to that date, the vast majority had been discovered in the main area known for its Yarmukian settlements, in and around the northern type-site of Sha'ar Hagolan, with just two exceptions further to the south. This new finding led to speculations that much of the Southern Levant might have been inhabited by a contiguous civilization during the time (c. 6400–6000 BCE), with differences in pottery types being more significant to today's archaeologists than to people living back then.

== Related sites ==
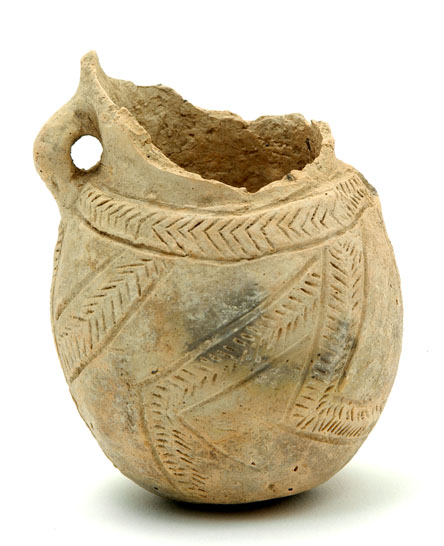
Yarmukian pottery vessel, Sha'ar HaGolan.

Although the Yarmukian culture occupied limited regions of northern Israel and northern Jordan, Yarmukian pottery has been found elsewhere in the region, including the Habashan Street excavations in Tel Aviv and as far north as Byblos, Lebanon. Besides the site at Sha'ar Hagolan, by 1999, 20 other Yarmukian sites have been identified in Israel, Palestine, Jordan and Lebanon. These include, alphabetically:

=== Israel ===
- Baysamun, Hula Valley
- HaZore'a (Jezreel Valley, Israel)
- HaBashan Street, Tel Aviv, 500 m south of the Yarkon River (Coastal Plain, Israel)
- Hamadiya (central Jordan Valley, Israel)
- Munhata (central Jordan Valley, Israel)
- Nahal Betzet II settlement (northern Israeli coastal plain)
- Nahal Zehora II settlement (southern Jezreel Valley, Menashe Hills, Israel)
- Nahal Sephoris 3 settlement (Western Galilee, Israel)
- Tel Kabri (Northern Coastal Plain, Israel)
- Tel Megiddo (Jezreel Valley, Israel) - Yarmukian settlement at the base of the tell
- Tel Qishyon/Qishion/Kishion (wrongly spelled as Tel Kishon by the press) near Mount Tabor (Lower Galilee, Israel)

=== Jordan ===
- Ain Ghazal (Jordan)
- 'Ain Rahub (Jordan)
- Jebel Abu Thawwab (Jordan)
- Wadi Shueib (Jordan)

=== Lebanon ===
- Byblos (Lebanon)

=== Palestine ===
- Tirzah (Tell el-Farah North) (Samaria Hills, West Bank)
- Wadi Murabba'at Cave (Judaean Desert, West Bank)
- Wadi Qanah Cave (western Samaria Hills, West Bank)

== See also ==
- Lodian culture
- Wadi Raba culture
