= Tel Tsaf =

Archaeological site in Israel

Coordinates: 32°24′24.46″N 35°32′53.81″E

Tel Tsaf courtyard building

Tel Tsaf (Hebrew: תל צף) is an archaeological site located in the central Jordan Valley, south-east of Beit She'an. Tel Tsaf is dated to the Middle Chalcolithic (ca. 5300/5200–4700/4500 BC) a little-known period in the archaeology of the Levant, post-dating the Pottery Neolithic B phase of the Wadi Rabah Culture and pre-dating the Ghassulian of the Late Chalcolithic.

== History ==
=== Middle Chalcolithic ===
The excavations unearthed four architectural complexes. Each consists of a closed courtyard with rounded or rectangular rooms and numerous rounded silos. Four burials were found within or adjacent to silos. Outside the settlement a well was cut into the water table, approximately 6.5 m in depth.

Tel Tsaf clay figurine of a dog.

Common finds included numerous flints, pottery and animal bones. The terms "Tel Tsaf Decoration" or "Tsafian" were derived from an assemblage of painted pottery, consisting mainly of relatively elaborate vessels bearing geometric decoration using red and black paint on a white slip background. The decoration was executed in two steps: first, white wash was applied to the upper part of the vessel, while the lower part was covered with red wash. Second, the patterns were painted in continuous horizontal bands on the upper part of the vessel. The painting was executed with a fine brush, in some cases 0.5 mm.

Other finds included about 150 clay sealings (bullae) and a rich assemblage of imported exotic items including artifacts of basalt and obsidian, beads, sea shells, Nilotic shell, and a few pottery sherds of the Ubaid culture of north Syria. This is the first reported occurrence of Ubaid sherds in an excavation in the southern Levant.

Archaeologists unearthed a 7,200-year-old pottery model of what looks like a silo, possibly the oldest example of a ritual propitiating the gods to preserve the crops or harvest.

==== Silos ====
The silos are cylindrical, barrel-shaped structures with an outer diameter between 2 and 4 m. The base is a podium, probably built to protect the cereals from rodents. It consists of several courses of bricks sealed inside with lime plaster. The silos demonstrate several universal principles guiding the construction of silos worldwide, past and present:

1. Rounded sides, giving the structure a cylindrical shape. This form better withstands the pressure exerted by the contents, which is distributed evenly onto the sides of the silo and does not create excessive stress at the base or the corners as is the case with a rectilinear shape.

2. Building of a number of silos near one another allows for greater ease of handling than one big installation. This facilitates separation of grain from different years or different crops. In the event of fire, humidity, rodent or insect infestation, some of the stored grain may be spared.

3. Organization of silos in adjacent rows facilitates their arrangement within a confined space. The stability of silo shape over considerable periods of time and large geographical regions provide an outstanding case in human architecture.

==== Olive Horticulture ====
Findings at Tel Tsaf show evidence of the domestication of the olive tree, perhaps the earliest of anywhere in the world.

==== Tools ====
An awl made of cast-metal copper and dated to the late sixth millennium or early fifth millennium BCE was found in 2007 during excavations. It was part of the grave goods accompanying the burial of a woman wearing a belt decorated with 1,668 ostrich eggshell beads. This is the most elaborate burial of its period in the entire Levant, the presence of the awl being an indication of the high prestige enjoyed by metal objects in that time and region. The fact that the grave was dug inside an abandoned silo is an indication for both the high status of the woman, and the importance ascribed to the silo. The chemical composition of the copper let the researchers believe that the awl originated in the Caucasus, from a distance of ca. 1,000 kilometres.

== Excavations ==
It was first tested in 1978–1980 by Ram Gophna of Tel Aviv University. In 2004–2007 a large excavation project was conducted at the site by Yosef Garfinkel of the Hebrew University of Jerusalem. Since 2013 the University of Haifa and the Zinman institute of archaeology started the renewed excavation of Tel Tsaf.

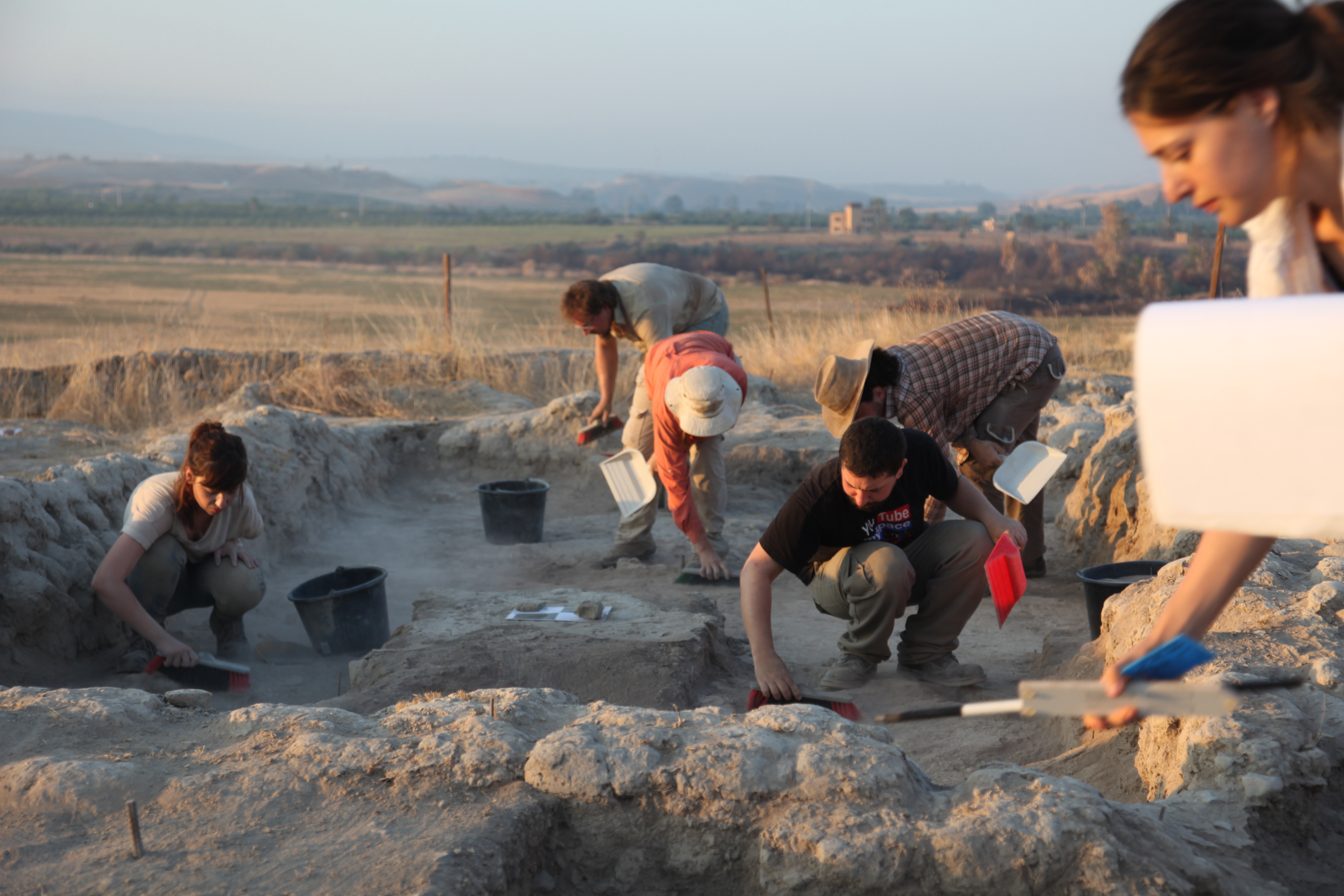
Tel Tsaf excavations, 2015

The excavations in Tel Tsaf were renewed in 2013 as a joint multidisciplinary project conducted by the Zinman Institute of Archaeology at the University of Haifa and the Eurasian Department of the German Archaeological Institute in Berlin, under the direction of Prof. Danny Rosenberg and Dr. Florian Klimscha. The main goals of this project is to explore various aspects of the Neolithic-Chalcolithic transition in the Jordan Valley by analysing the temporal and spatial attributes of social and economic variations among households in different and new parts of the tell and to provide better data concerning the environmental conditions and the Jordan River during the late 6th and early 5th millennia CalBC.

== See also ==
- Archaeology in Israel
- Cities of the ancient Near East
