= Meg Wheatley =

American writer and teacher (born 1944)

Margaret "Meg" Wheatley (born 1944) is an American writer, teacher, speaker, and management consultant, known for her 1992 book Leadership and the New Science: Discovering Order in a Chaotic World, a notable work in the field of systems theory.

== Personal life and education ==
Born in Yonkers, New York, in 1944, to an English father and a Jewish-American mother, Wheatley grew up in the New York City area. Her grandmother, Irma Lindheim, was a well-known activist, writer, and fundraiser for the creation of the state of Israel. Lindheim lived in the kibbutz Mishmar HaEmek, frequently visiting her family in the U.S., and greatly influenced the young Wheatley.

Wheatley graduated from Lincoln High School (Yonkers, New York), in 1962. She completed her baccalaureate degree in 1966 at the University of Rochester, where she majored in English and history, and spent her junior year abroad at the University College London.

From 1966 to 1968, Wheatley served in the Peace Corps in Cholla Namdo Province, Korea, teaching high school English. She returned from Korea via the Trans-Siberian Railroad, and recalled she and her travelling companion were assumed to be CIA agents in the Peace Corps, and were called "thugs wearing peace masks."

Advised by Neil Postman, Wheatley received her M.A. in communications and systems thinking from New York University. She moved to the Boston, Massachusetts, area aged 30, to study for an Ed.D. in administration, planning, and social policy at Harvard Graduate School of Education. Her dissertation was titled Equal Employment Opportunity Awareness Training: the Influence of Theories of Attitude Change and Adult Learning in the Corporate Setting.

Wheatley married in 1977, while completing doctoral work at Harvard, but got divorced in 1992. As of 2020, she had six children, 23 grandchildren and six great-grandchildren. She has resided in Utah since 1989, close to most of her family.

Wheatley has an interest in Eastern spiritual practices and studied under the late Namkhai Norbu.

== Career ==
Wheatley's practice as an organizational consultant and researcher began in 1973, working with Rosabeth Moss Kanter in the firm Goodmeasure, Cambridge, Mass.

Wheatley has been associate professor of management in two graduate programs: the Marriott School of Management, Brigham Young University, and Cambridge College, Massachusetts. She served in a formal advisory capacity for leadership programs in England, Croatia, Denmark, Australia, and the United States. In 1991, she co-founded the Berkana Institute, a global charitable leadership foundation, and has been involved in the Institute's leadership initiatives worldwide, with a focus on the Global South.

== Awards and tributes ==
Wheatley has received multiple awards and honorary doctorates. In 1992, her first book, Leadership and the New Science, won Industry Week's "Best Management Book". The American Society for Training and Development (ASTD) has named her one of five living legends. In May 2002, ASTD awarded her their highest honor: "Distinguished Contribution to Workplace Learning and Performance". She was elected to the Leonardo da Vinci Society for the Study of Thinking in 2005.

In 2010, she was appointed to the National Park Service advisory board by the White House and the United States Secretary of the Interior, Ken Salazar. She served until 2018, when the twelve member advisors resigned en masse in protest of the new policies of the government of President Donald Trump.

She received a Lifetime Achievement Award from the International Leadership Association (ILA) in 2014.

In 2016, Wheatley was honored with the Clara Snell Woodbury Distinguished Leadership Award, as well as recognition from Leadership California.

== Publications ==
Her books include:

- 1992. Leadership and the New Science: Discovering Order in a Chaotic World (in 3 editions and 20 languages), Berrett-Koehler Publishers; ISBN 9781576753446.
- 1998. A Simpler Way (with Myron Kellner-Rogers), Berrett-Koehler Publishers; ISBN 9781576750506.
- 2002. Turning to One Another: Simple Conversations to Restore Hope to the Future, Berrett-Koehler Publishers; ISBN 9781576757642.
- 2007. Finding Our Way: Leadership for an Uncertain Time, Berrett-Koehler Publishers; ISBN 9781576754054.
- 2010. Perseverance (paintings by Asante Salaam), Berrett-Koehler Publishers; ISBN 9781605098203.
- 2011. Walk Out Walk On: A Learning Journey into Communities Daring to Live the Future Now (with Deborah Frieze), Berrett-Koehler Publishers; ISBN 9781605097312.
- 2012. So Far From Home: Lost and Found in Our Brave New World, Berrett-Koehler Publishers; ISBN 9781609945367.
- 2014. How Does Raven Know: Entering Sacred World /A Meditative Memoir, Berkana Publications; ISBN 9780982669914
- 2017. Who Do We Choose to Be?: Facing Reality, Claiming Leadership, Restoring Sanity, Berrett-Koehler Publishers; ISBN 9781523083633.
- 2020. Warriors for the Human Spirit: A Songline. A Journey Guided By Voice And Sound. An mp3 with accompanying book. (music by Jerry Granelli), Berkana Publications; ISBN 9781792346101.
- 2023. Who Do We Choose to Be?: Facing Reality, Claiming Leadership, Restoring Sanity, 2nd Edition Berrett-Koehler Publishers; ISBN 9781523004737.
- 2023. Restoring Sanity: Practices to Awaken Generosity, Creativity, and Kindness in Ourselves and Our Organizations Berrett-Koehler Publishers; ISBN 9781523006267.
- 2024. Opening to the World as It Is | Poems of Experience Berkana Publications.
