= Lindseth =

Lindseth is a Norwegian surname. Notable people with the surname include:

- Jonathan Lindseth (born 1996), Norwegian footballer
- Ketil Lindseth (born 1977), Norwegian politician
- Peter Lindseth (born 1962), American lawyer
