= Bjørn Kristvik =

Norwegian diplomat (born 1928)

Bjørn Kristvik (born 19 March 1928) is a Norwegian diplomat.

Kristvik was born in Nesset, and was a mag.art. by education. He started working for the Norwegian Ministry of Foreign Affairs in 1955. He served as the secretary for the parliamentary Standing Committee on Foreign and Constitutional Affairs from 1966 to 1970, and was afterwards posted as a counsellor at the Norwegian delegation to NATO in Brussels. He served as the Norwegian ambassador to Indonesia from 1974 to 1979, to Egypt from 1979 to 1984, to NATO from 1989 to 1992 and to Canada from 1992 to 1996.

Diplomatic posts
Preceded by Eivinn Berg	Permanent Representative of Norway to NATO; 1989–1992	Succeeded by Leif Mevik
Preceded by Jan Edmund Nyheim	Norwegian ambassador to Canada; 1988–1992	Succeeded by Johan Ludvik Løvald
