= Vindenes =

Vindenes is a surname. Notable people with the surname include:

- Erling Johan Vindenes (1900–1984), Norwegian politician
- Helge Vindenes (born 1931), Norwegian diplomat
