= Adin Talbar =

German-born Israeli diplomat and athlete

Adin Talbar (Hebrew: עדין טלבר; 8 October 1921 – 6 September 2013), was a German-born Israeli diplomat and athlete who served as Deputy Director of the Israel Ministry for Commerce and Industry, furthered German-Israeli cooperation and founded the Israel Academic Sports Association (A.S.A.).

== Biography ==
Adin Theilhabar (later Talbar) was born in Berlin. He was a grandson of Adolph Theilhaber, who was an advisor to the Bavarian court, and the son of Felix A. Theilhaber, a dermatologist and author in the early 20th century. Originally from Bamberg, his father came to Berlin, where he married Stefanie Czapinska, who came from an educated Jewish household in Włocławek, Poland.

After attending the Theodor-Herzl elementary school, Talbar was a pupil at the Goethe-Gymnasium for one year until 1933. When antisemitic discrimination increased he re-joined the Theodor-Herzl School run by Paula Fürst, which was the only Zionist school in Berlin. His father was arrested and deported to the concentration camp Plötzensee for two months in 1933. After his release his doctor's license was cancelled and, in 1935, the family immigrated to the British Mandate Palestine. Without his parents, Talbar joined Kibbutz Mishmar Haemek, where he studied and worked in agriculture. Individualistically disposed, he left the Kibbutz in 1938 to follow his brother Tola Theilhaber to London. There he studied for his matriculation at the Regent Street Polytechnic. Talbar studied Economics at the London School of Economics/ At the outbreak of the Independence War of Israel in 1948 he had to discontinue his studies, because of a shortage of officers in the Israeli army. After two years in the army he continued his studies at the Hebrew University of Jerusalem, where he completed his bachelor's degree.

== Military career ==
After returning to Palestine at the outbreak of World War II, for several months Talbar joined the Trans-Jordan Frontier Force in 1940. In 1942 he became an officer in the Palestine Regiment of the British Army. There he became friends with Hazim el-Khalidi, who later was the commander of the Syrian Yarmouk Regiment in the Israel-Arab War 1948–1949, and Jordanian tourism director in Jerusalem until 1967. Despite the Arab-Israeli conflict Talbar and Khalidi stayed lifelong friends, advocating a peaceful two-state solution to the Israel-Palestine question.

Talbar saw combat in the Italian campaign as part of the Jewish Brigade. After the end of the war he helped Jewish Holocaust survivors escape from northern Italy in order to facilitate their emigration to Palestine. During a motorcycle trip to Munich a month after the war Talbar met the man who later became the Prison Psychologist of the Nuremberg Trials, Gustave Gilbert, in Salzburg, where Gilbert handed him photographs of the Dachau concentration camp. The post-war period Talbar spent in the Netherlands, Belgium, Germany and France. During the demobilization of the Jewish Brigade Talbar began studies at the Institut Paris des Hautes Études Cinématographiques. In 1946 he became aware of the situation in the Bergen-Belsen concentration camp and began to shoot a film there about the living conditions of the 15,000 Jewish survivors under British administration. Due to the politically charged situation – the future of the Holocaust-Survivors was unclear and immigration restrictions to the British Palestine Mandate remained – Talbar was arrested. According to the British Undersecretary State of War Michael Stewart the film constituted "anti-British propaganda", was "subversive and could have severe effects on the security of (British troops), in Germany and also in Palestine".

Talbar spent four months in the British military prison of Bielefeld until he was released after the intercession of his Colonel in the Jewish Brigade. During his time in prison Talbar exchanged letters with Arthur Koestler, whom he had already gotten to know in his father's household. After his release Talbar recovered for a few weeks in Koestler's house in Wales. Through Koestler, Talbar established contact with the pro-Jewish British Member of Parliament Richard Crossman. Even Crossman could only find out that the film material had been destroyed.

In 1947, he began studying at the London School of Economics but cut his studies short to fight in the Israel Defense Forces during the 1948 Arab-Israeli War.

== Diplomatic career ==
After his graduation from the university he joined the Israel Finance Ministry. He served as Israeli Consul to Canada in Montreal from 1957 to 1960, and between 1961 and 1965 he was economic counselor at the Israeli Embassy in Washington. During this time he negotiated with the United States amongst others the Food for Peace agreement. As Deputy Director General of the Commerce and Industry Ministry he was the Israeli negotiator at the Kennedy Round of the General Agreement on Tariffs and Trade (GATT) between from 1965 to 1967. He negotiated the economic agreement with the Federal Republic of Germany (1965–6) and he was the representative of the Commerce Ministry for the negotiations with the European Community to reach a free trade agreement between 1965 and 1975. Thereafter he entered private business and became a consultant to the United Nations Conference on Trade and Development (UNCTAD) and referee at GATT. From 1985 until his death Talbar has served as the Danish Honorary Consul in Jerusalem.

== Sports career ==
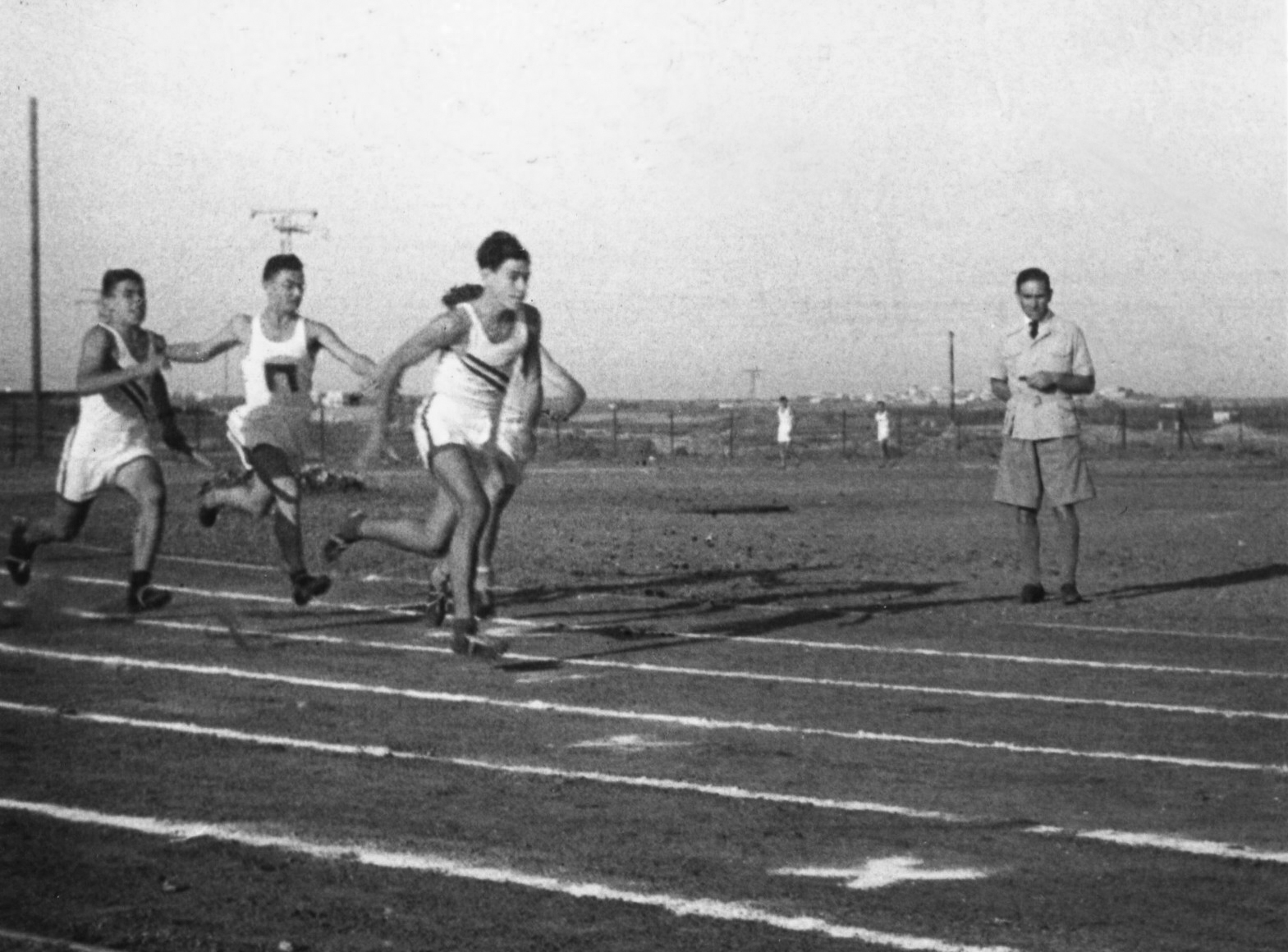
Finishing sprint of Adin Talbar to become national 800 meter champion in 1942

As a child active in Bar Kochba und Makkabi Berlin, Talbar was national 800 meter champion in 1942 and medium distance champion of the 8th British Army in 1945. In 1953 he founded the Israeli Academic Sports Association (A.S.A.) and was A.S.A.'s representative to Fédération Internationale du Sport Universitaire (FISU) from 1954 to 1977. Furthermore, he was chief auditor of the FISU executive from 1967 to 1971. In light of Talbar’s success in convincing the United States, Canada, Australia and New Zealand to join FISU, and due to his efforts to reconcile the eastern and western blocks in sports, Talbar was made honorary member of FISU in 2001. Moreover, the American State Department awarded him a medal for his assistance to the United States in their preparations for the FISU Universiade 1967.

== German-Israeli relations ==
Following the successful negotiations about economic aid to Israel, Talbar was co-founder of the German-Israeli Chamber of Commerce in Tel Aviv in 1966. In 1966 Talbar organized an international university basketball tournament at the Tel Aviv University. For the first time a German sports team – the team of the University of Heidelberg – participated in a competition against an Israeli team in Israel. The games were opened by FISU president Primo Nebiolo. Accompanied by demonstrations and under the protection of 200 policemen the Israeli and German team leaders exchanged crests. The German flag was guarded by police throughout the tournament. This broke the taboo of sports, however, and by extension cultural contacts between Germany and Israel. In 1978 he founded the German-Israeli Association in Jerusalem.

== Awards and recognition ==
Talbar was awarded the German first class Federal Cross of Merit in 1985, received the Danish Knight’s Cross Dannebrog in 1993, and, in 2011, he became honorary citizen of Jerusalem.

== Filmography ==
- In Our Own Hands. The Hidden Story of the Jewish Brigade in World War II (1998) as himself
- Helden ohne Heimat. (2003) as himself
- Das Wiedersehen. (2007) director and as himself

== Published works ==
- "Erinnerungen an die Theodor Herzl Schule in Berlin". Ed. of the German Version. Jerusalem, 1998.
- "Foreign Trade." Economy. Israel Pocket Library. Jerusalem, 1973.
- "Trade Shows Need Planning." Going into Trade Fairs. International Trade Centre UNCTAD/GATT. Genf 1982.
- "Sports in the Jewish Brigade." in Georg Eisen, Haim Kaufman und Manfred Lämmer (Hrsg.) Sport and Physical Education in Jewish History. Wingate Institute Israel, 2003.
- Felix A. Theilhaber. Hrsg. von Adin Theilhaber-Talbar und Günther Keller. "Jüdische Flieger im Weltkrieg." Faksimilie der Erstausgabe von 1924. Verlag Der Schild, Berlin 2009.
- "The Last One of the Second Aliya. Ziva" "האחרונה מהעלייה השנייה. זיוה". Jerusalem, 2011.
