= First House (company) =

Norwegian company

- Industry: Professional services
- Founded: 2010
- Key people: Bjarne Håkon Hanssen; Ketil Lindseth; Per Høiby; Bjørn Richard Johansen; Morten Wetland; Tor Mikkel Wara; Morten Andreas Meyer; Geir Helljesen; Einar Lunde; Leif Monsen

First House is a Norwegian strategic advisory, corporate communications, governmental affairs and crisis management/issue management agency.

First House, with 27 senior advisers and 9 associate partners, started its operation Monday 4 January 2010. It was founded by former head of global corporate communication in Glitnir, Islandsbanki, and communications adviser in Sparebank1 Bjørn Richard Johansen. The firm is located with office in Oslo in Norway. Managing partner is Per Høiby, brother of Crown Princess Mette-Marit. Partner Leif Monsen is Chair of the board in First House.

Key partners and cofounders include, minister of three different ministries including the Ministry of Health and Care Services, Bjarne Håkon Hanssen and state secretary Ketil Lindseth. Several of the firms advisers, including Bjarne Håkon Hanssen had 6 months quarantine before they could join the firm. The founder Bjørn Richard Johansen recruited politicians as partners and co-founders of the firm, something which has been sharply criticized. This led to a debate about the PR-industry and its growing importance in Norway. Notable former politicians and political advisers that work for the company include Morten Andreas Meyer, (Høyre, The Conservative party), Tor Mikkel Wara (Fremskrittspartiet/The Progressive party), Morten Wetland (Arbeiderpartiet/Labour) and Erlend Fuglum (Senterpartiet/The Centre party). Former notable journalists include news editor in VG (VG, Schibsted) for several years Hans-Christian Vadseth, NRK reporter for more than 40 years Geir Helljesen and Einar Lunde People. Morten Wetland joined the firm in 2013 from the position as Norway´s UN ambassador. Wetland also served as the Norwegian ambassador to Germany.

A similar group of senior advisers with background from industry and finance are working at the firm: Geir Arne Drangeid worked with Aker for 22 years, including many years as a key member of the leadership team of the successful Norwegian tycoon Kjell Inge Røkke. He leads the firms focus on the finance sector and private equity including M&A, IPOs and legislation advisory. Key members in this unit include Leif Monsen, Kari Holm Hejna and Andreas Nyheim. Nyheim joined First House from Norway´s business daily Dagens Næringsliv in 2013.

The firm won the award as Consultancy of the year 2014 in Norway by Konsulentguiden. First House also received the award as SABRE Newcomer of the year by Holmes Report in May 2012 and was nominated as SABRE Financial consultancy of the year in May 2013.

Minister of Migration and Integration, former Minister of Agriculture and Food in the current Conservative/Progressive Erna Solberg government in Norway, Sylvi Listhaug, worked with First House until she stepped down to join the ministerial position in October 2013. During her time in government she had contacts with several clients of First House including, controversially, one of her last clients, supermarket chain Rema 1000

Dean of the Marketing college (Markedshøyskolen) Trond Blindheim has referred to First House as the company with "the most expansive and clever lobbyists". On 19 June 2013 Dagbladet said that the company commenting on the Norwegian parliamentary election 2013 for TV2, is a conflict of interest.

== Clients ==
In 2013 Norsk Telegrambyrå said that the list of the company's clients is public information within the European Union—and that the information is listed on a web page.

Their clients that are known to the public include Olympiatoppen.

Former clients include Uber [in Norway]. First House's list of clients are kept secret.
