= Sandra Bass =

American political scientist

Sandra Bass is an American political scientist. She holds a PhD in political science from University of California, Berkeley. She is an associate dean of students and director of the Public Service Center at the University of California, Berkeley, a position she has held since 2015. Bass has written articles on the relationship between race and policing in the United States, including "Policing Space, Policing Race: Social Control Imperatives and Police Discretionary Decisions," published in Social Justice. She is a former board chair of the Ella Baker Center for Human Rights. She has listed writers Margaret Wheatley and Grace Lee Boggs among figures who have influenced her work.
