= Shulamit Bat-Dori =

Polish-Israeli playwright and kibbutz theatre director (1904–1985)

- שולמית בת-דורי
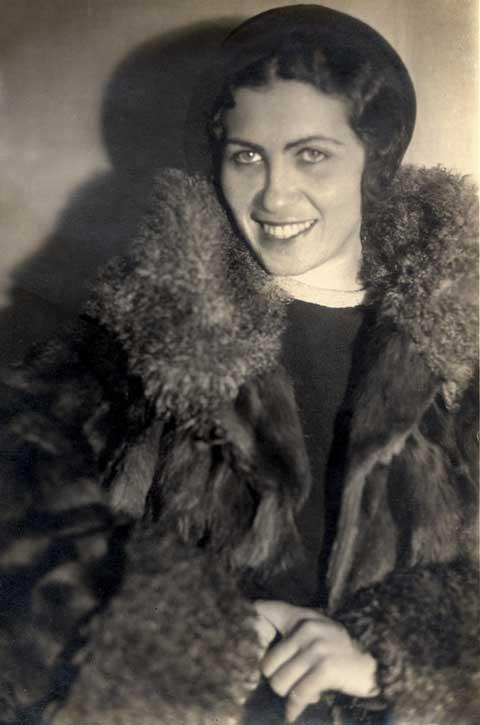
- Bat-Dori in 1930
- Born: Shulamit Gutgeld; 7 December 1904; Warsaw, Congress Poland, Russian Empire
- Died: February 1985 (age 80); Mishmar HaEmek, Israel
- Burial place: Mishmar HaEmek, Israel
- Education: B.A., theatre arts, Tel Aviv University
- Occupations: Kibbutz theatre director and producer, playwright, dance festival director, theatre professor
- Years active: 1934–1980
- Organization: Kibbutz HaArtzi Company
- Known for: Kibbutz theatre
- Movement: Hashomer Hatzair
- Spouse: Reuven Ziv
- Children: 2
- Parent(s): Joseph and Helene Gutgeld
- Relatives: Mordechai Bentov (brother)

Shulamit Bat-Dori (Hebrew: שולמית בת-דורי; 7 December 1904 – February 1985; née Gutgeld) was a Polish-Israeli playwright, kibbutz theatre director and producer, and dance festival director. A member of Hashomer Hatzair and its kibbutz, Mishmar HaEmek, she was involved in the development of political theatre in Palestine, writing and producing plays that reinforced the ideology of the Kibbutz Movement. She was known for her huge, open-air performances that enlisted hundreds of kibbutz members and attracted thousands of viewers. She represented Israel at international conferences and was a professor in the theatre department at Tel Aviv University from 1965 to 1974.

== Early life and education ==
Shulamit Gutgeld was born to an assimilated Jewish family in Warsaw. Her father, Joseph Gutgeld, had been raised in a wealthy Haredi home and was married at the age of 16. After having two children, at the age of 21, he gave up Orthodox Judaism, deserted his wife and children, and moved to Warsaw without any means of support. In 1899, he married Helene, an assimilated Jew herself from a financially comfortable family. The couple had two children, Mordechai (born 1900) and Shulamit. Joseph committed suicide in 1922. Helene eventually moved to Israel and died in 1958.

Shulamit was exposed at an early age to classical music, theatre, and dance, and received private tutoring in German and French. After graduating from a gymnasium, she entered the University of Warsaw at the age of 16, studying philosophy and psychology.

Her brother, who became known as Mordechai Bentov, who studied law at the University of Warsaw, was the leader of the Warsaw branch of Hashomer Hatzair. He encouraged Shulamit to join the organization, and she began producing plays together with younger members. In 1920, Mordechai made aliyah to Mandatory Palestine, and Shulamit followed in 1923. They both became members of Kibbutz Mishmar HaEmek, a Hashomer Hatzair settlement. Mordechai embarked on a political career, being one of the signatories of the declaration of independence in 1948 and a Member of Knesset.

Shulamit initially worked in house painting and drove a tractor in Afula. For the 1 May celebration of International Workers' Day, kibbutz members asked her to stage a play. She wrote the script for Bread in three hours. Forty of the eighty members of the kibbutz were involved in the production, which was attended by visiting American novelist Waldo Frank.

Together with Ya'akov Hazan, whom she had first met in Warsaw, Shulamit returned to Poland as an emissary for Hashomer Hatzair and worked as a counselor for older girls in the movement's branches.

== Theatrical career ==
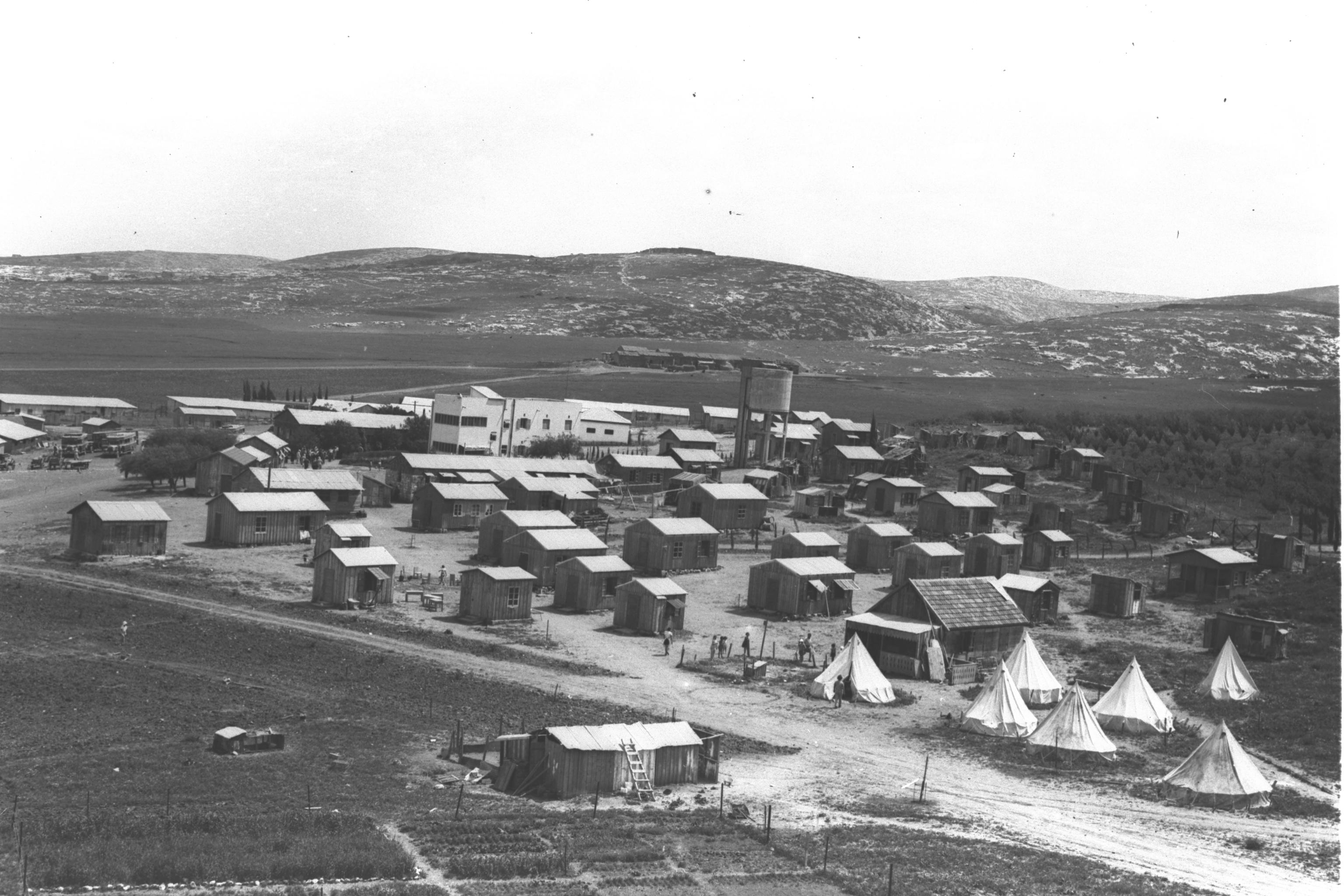
Kibbutz Mishmar HaEmek in 1933

In 1930, she traveled to Europe to study dance under Rudolf von Laban and theatre under Max Reinhardt and Erwin Piscator. She also learned about "theater for the masses" and political theatre, and became proficient in this genre.

In 1934, she returned to Palestine, now calling herself Shulamit Bat-Dori. She began acting in the Matate Theatre, "a small political cabaret", and then returned to Mishmar HaEmek to found a kibbutz theatre, an unusual concept at the time. While the other members protested that the kibbutz should be focused solely on agriculture, Bat-Dori wished to exploit the artistic form for political purposes. The first production of the Kibbutz HaArtzi Company addressed the problems faced by new immigrants. Another production, When You, A Simple Man, Set Out on Your Way, aroused such a hostile response from right-wing circles that the British Mandate authorities prohibited its performance "on grounds of public safety". Her play The Trial, based on the 1936–39 Arab revolt in Palestine, was also censored by the British; it was staged by the Jüdischer Kulturbund in Berlin in May 1938.

Bat-Dori wrote most of her scripts and was a pioneer in "stagecraft and the combination of staging and choreography" which until then were unknown in Palestine. Her vision of kibbutz theatre was to effect "a kind of communal psychoanalysis by concentrating the efforts of an entire community on a real-life, historical topic with a meaning and a message especially suited to a particular time and place". For example, her adaptation of Howard Fast's My Glorious Brothers, staged for the 25th anniversary of Givat Brenner in 1953, sought to draw a parallel between Israel's recent War of Independence and the ancient Maccabean Revolt. In this way, it furthered the Kibbutz Movement's ideology of reframing ancient Jewish religious practices and holidays in a modern, secular context, and conveyed the impression of the "social and economic power" of the kibbutz.

As a kibbutz member herself, Bat-Dori could enlist the services of hundreds of kibbutz members from one or more communal settlements for her productions. For My Glorious Brothers, she assembled a cast and crew of 1,000, including "actors, builders, carpenters, electricians, stage designers, and dressmakers" from Givat Brenner, who collectively invested more than 3,000 work days in the project. She also took both the action and the audience outdoors, erecting a real village, planting trees, and constructing an outdoor amphitheater on a nearby hillside. Other open-air productions saw her "moving hills, uprooting and replanting ancient trees", and using surrounding mountains as a natural backdrop. The audiences for these outdoor productions were huge: the Givat Brenner show drew 10,000 viewers, as did Bat-Dori's 1955 outdoor production of Till Eulenspiegel.

Bat-Dori pursued further theatrical training in the 1960s, including a course with Lee Strasberg at the Actors Studio in New York in 1960, a course with Bertolt Brecht in Berlin in 1961, and a course in technical lighting and sound in France in 1964. She earned a bachelor's degree from the Department of Theatre Arts at the University of Tel Aviv. Despite her professional training, Bat-Dori never worked in professional theatre. Some of her plays, however, were staged at the Ohel Theater, Cameri Theater, and The Kibbutz Stage in Israel; others were performed in the United States, Europe, and South Africa. In all, she wrote 13 plays and directed 15.

Bat-Dori also directed two national dance festivals and two folk dance festivals. She directed the last two national dance festivals staged at Kibbutz Dalia, in 1958 and 1968. The 1958 production showcased 1,500 dancers, while the 1968 festival brought together 3,000 dancers and 60,000 audience members. For these festivals, Bat-Dori and project director Gurit Kadman encouraged the inclusion of little-known folk dances from the Jews of Libya and the Jews of the Atlas Mountains. Bat-Dori also directed two folk dance festivals that were staged in Tel Aviv, Jerusalem, and Haifa in 1961 and 1963 under the name From the Ends of the Earth.

== Other activities ==
Bat-Dori wrote the screenplay for the Israeli film Dim'at Hanechama Hagedola (Tears of Consolation, 1947).

She was a professor of directing and acting in the theatre department at Tel Aviv University from 1965 to 1974. Afterwards, she undertook research on the effects of the "theater of the masses".

In 1980, she published a book of short stories titled Ka-zot lo tifraḥ ʻod le-ʻolam (No One Like Her Will Ever Again Blossom).

== Memberships ==
She was a member of the Public Council for Culture and the Arts from 1960 to 1970 and 1974 to 1979, and a member of the Ministry of Foreign Affairs' board of folklore troupes and cultural exchange from 1965 to 1980. She represented Israel at conferences of the International Theatre Institute.

== Personal life ==
In 1939, she married Reuven Ziv; the couple had one son and one daughter. Their son died at age six. Their daughter, Orna Sapir Kam, was the artistic director of the 17th National Youth Theatre Festival Bat Yam in 2011.

Bat-Dori died in February 1985 and was buried at Mishmar HaEmek. Her brother Mordechai had died the month before and was also buried on the kibbutz.

== Sources ==
- Bat-Dori, Shulamit (1980). Kazot lʼo tifraḥ ʻod le-ʻolam: Sipurim [No One Like Her Will Ever Again Blossom] (in Hebrew). Kibbutz HaArzi Hashomer Hatzair.
- Gavron, Daniel (2000). The Kibbutz: Awakening from Utopia. Rowman & Littlefield. ISBN 0847695263.
- Guber, Rivka (1972). Only a Path. Massada.
- Ingber, Judith Brin (2011). Seeing Israeli and Jewish Dance. Wayne State University Press. ISBN 978-0814333303.
- Kohansky, Mendel (1969). The Hebrew Theatre: Its First Fifty Years. Ktav Publishing House. "Shulamit Bat-Dori." *Leaman, Oliver, ed. (2003). Companion Encyclopedia of Middle Eastern and North African Film. Routledge. ISBN 1134662521.
- Patai, Raphael, ed. (1971). Encyclopedia of Zionism and Israel. Vol. 2. Herzl Press. ISBN 9780070796355.
- Shakow, Zara (1963). The Theatre in Israel. Herzl Press.
