= Else Berit Eikeland =

Norwegian diplomat (born 1957)

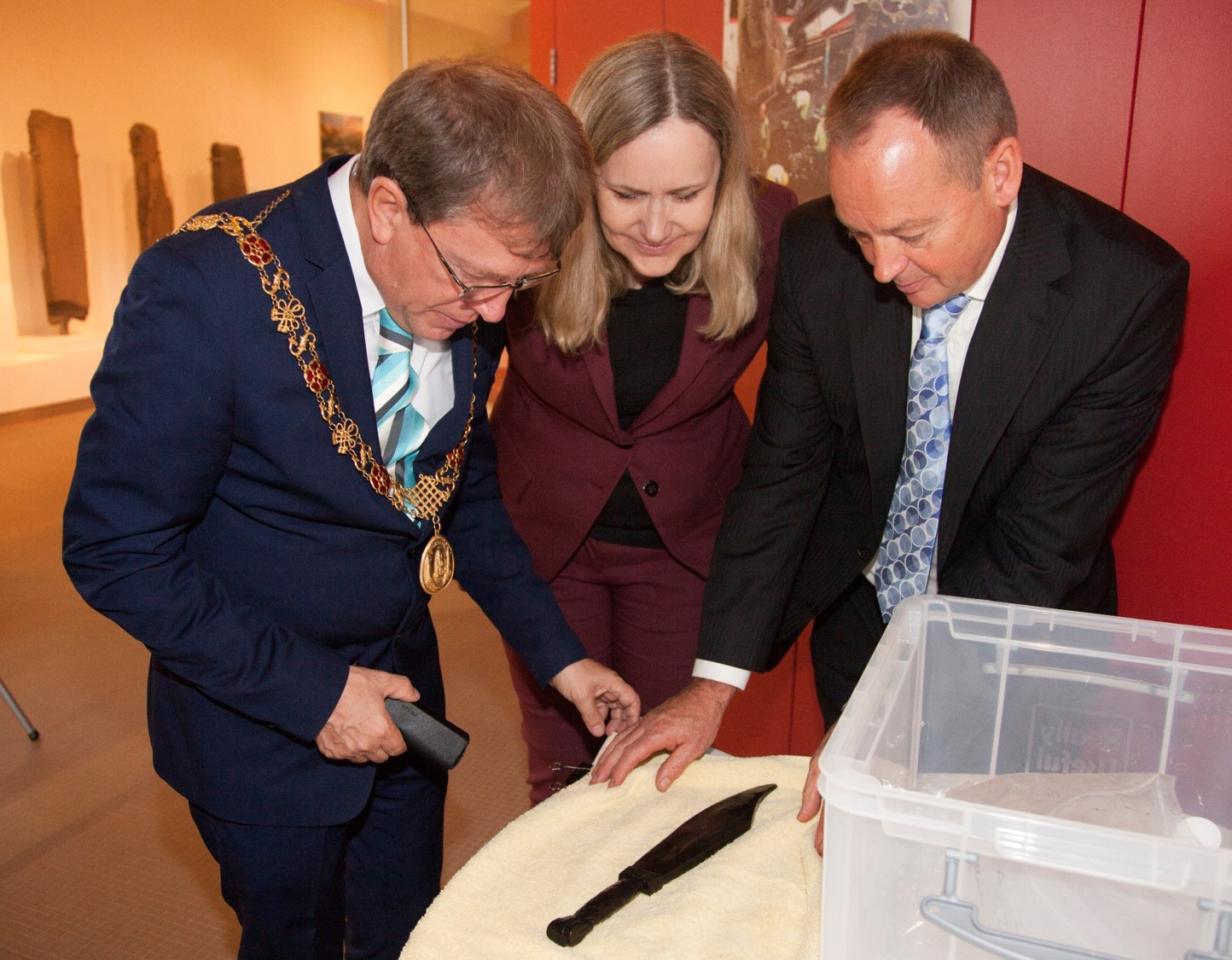
Eikeland visiting Cork Public Museum in 2017

Else Berit Eikeland (born 22 October 1957) is a Norwegian diplomat.

Eikeland began her career with the Norwegian Ministry of Foreign Affairs in 1987. She was promoted to subdirector in 1998 and later served as a counsellor at the Norwegian embassy in London from 2004 to 2006. Upon her return to the Ministry of Foreign Affairs in 2007, she served as a senior adviser before becoming the head of department. She served as the Norwegian ambassador to Canada from 2009 to 2012, polar affairs adviser and ambassador to the Arctic Council from 2013 to 2016, and ambassador to Ireland from 2016 to 2020, and ambassador to Estonia in 2020.

Diplomatic posts
Preceded by Tor Berntin Næss	Norwegian ambassador to Canada; 2009–2012	Succeeded by Mona Elisabeth Brøther
