= Hans-Christian Vadseth =

Norwegian newspaper editor (born 1963)

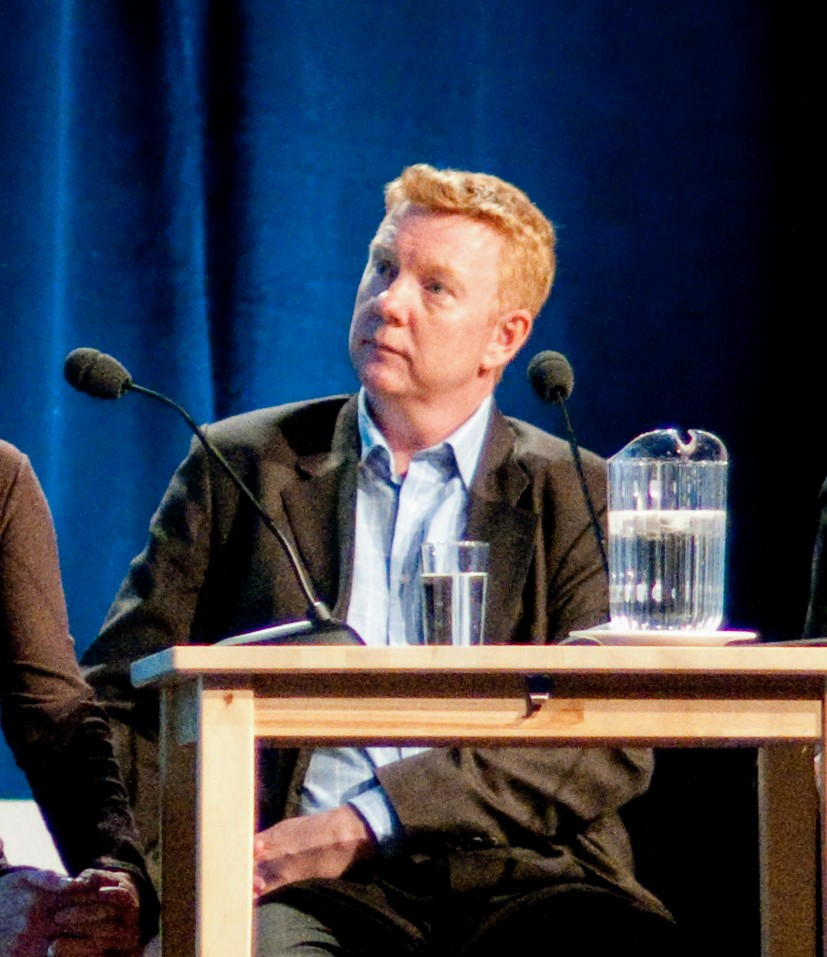
Hans-Christian Vadseth, 2012

Hans-Christian Vadseth (born 9 January 1963) is a Norwegian newspaper editor.

He studied journalism at the University of Georgia, and spent his early journalist career in Fædrelandsvennen from 1985 to 1987 and Dagbladet from 1987 to 1990. He was a journalist in Verdens Gang from 1990 to 2000, news editor in Verdens Gang from 2000 to 2006, editor-in-chief of E24 Næringsliv from 2006 to 2008 and in Fædrelandsvennen from 2008. He also had a column in Morgenbladet.

When Vadseth resigned from Fædrelandsvennen with immediate effect in 2010, he was quickly hired as a partner in the communications company First House.

Vadseth is a Christian.
