= Hans Jacob Biørn Lian =

Norwegian diplomat

Hans Jacob "Jakken" Biørn Lian (born 31 March 1942) is a Norwegian diplomat.

== Biography ==
Hans Jacob Biørn Lian was born in Oslo and was educated at University of Neuchâtel. He started working for the Norwegian Ministry of Foreign Affairs in 1967. He headed the Norwegian delegation that negotiated the Treaty on Conventional Armed Forces in Europe. He was then a deputy under-secretary of state in the Ministry of Foreign Affairs from 1992 to 1994, the Norwegian ambassador to the United Nations in New York City from 1994 to 1997, and Norway's Permanent Representative to NATO from 1997 to 2002. From 2002 to 2004 he was a special advisor of the Minister of Foreign Affairs, tasked with monitoring the Middle East peace process. From 2005 to 2010 he was the Norwegian ambassador to Israel.

Diplomatic posts
Preceded by Martin Huslid	Permanent Representative of Norway to the United Nations; 1994–1997	Succeeded by Ole Peter Kolby
Preceded by Leif Mevik	Permanent Representative of Norway to NATO; 1997–2002	Succeeded by Kai Eide
Preceded by Mona Juul	Norwegian ambassador to Israel; 2005–2010	Succeeded by Svein Sevje
