= Einar Lunde =

Norwegian news anchor (born 1943)

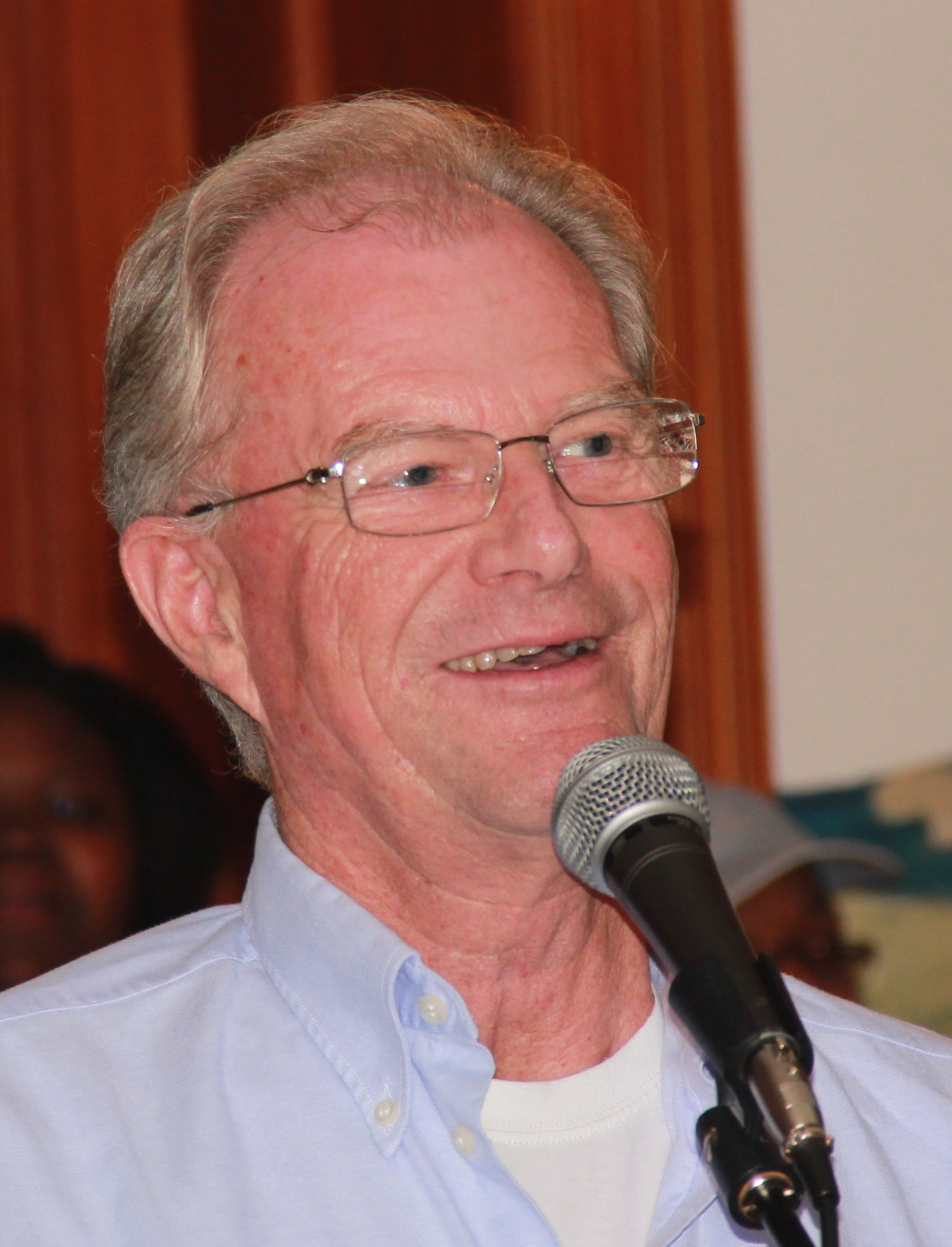
Portrait of Einar Lunde

Einar Lunde (born 13 March 1943) is a Norwegian news anchor.

He began in 1968 as a summer temp at NRK Dagsrevyen, and from 1970 to 2010 he was a regular news anchor. For several years, he worked a part-time job arranging travels to Africa, a continent he had covered extensively as a journalist. Among others, he was reportedly the first Norwegian journalist to interview Nelson Mandela. In 2010, differences arose with the NRK leadership over this part-time job, causing Lunde to resign from NRK. He instead started his own company and also worked for First House.

He was born in Oslo as a son of bishop Sigurd Lunde. He was raised in Stavanger, until the age of 10 when the family moved back to Oslo. He took his education at Concordia College and the University of Oslo. He now resides at Østerås, is married and has five children.
