= Svein Sevje =

Norwegian diplomat

Svein Reidar Sevje (born 29 October 1948) is a Norwegian diplomat, particularly known for his work in the Middle East.

A few months after the Six-Day War Sevje volunteered in the Israeli kibbutz of Mishmar HaEmek, and later joined a Hebrew school. He is a trained historian, and graduated in 1977 from the University of Oslo.

Working for the Norwegian Foreign Service for several years, Sevje advanced in 1992 to become assistant secretary. He then headed the Foreign Ministry's Africa section from 1993-1994, and the Middle East section from 1998-2002. He was stationed in Israel during the Norwegian role in subsequent deals regarding the Oslo Accords known as "Oslo 2", and earlier in 1995 was the first diplomatic representative of Norway to The Palestinian Authority. Sevje has since served as an ambassador in Syria and Lebanon from 2006 to 2008, and was a special envoy to the Middle East. Sevje was ambassador in Damascus after the Norwegian Embassy was burned by protestors in February 2006, in response to the Jyllands-Posten Muhammad cartoons controversy.

From 2008, Sevje was ambassador to Sudan, until being appointed ambassador to Israel by the Council of State on 9 April 2010. In 2011, Sevje was involved in controversy when, in the context of the 2011 terrorist attacks in Norway perpetrated by Anders Behring Breivik, he stated, talking the first person plural, that Norwegians consider Israeli occupation to be the cause of Palestinian terror, coming out of a wish for revenge, with an added religious element; and that a solution cannot be reached between Israel and the Palestinians without engaging the Hamas organization.

In 2009, Sevje was appointed a Knight of the 1st Class, and Commander of the Royal Norwegian Order of Merit H.M. for civil merit.

Diplomatic posts
Preceded by Hans Jacob Biørn Lian	Norwegian ambassador to Israel; 2010–2015	Succeeded by Jon Hanssen-Bauer
