= Tor Berntin Næss =

Norwegian diplomat (1942–2026)

Tor Berntin Næss (28 August 1942 – 22 October 2026) was a Norwegian diplomat.

He was born in Inderøy Municipality, and is a cand.oecon. by education. He started working for the Norwegian Ministry of Trade, and was appointed as a deputy under-secretary of state in the Norwegian Ministry of Foreign Affairs in 1989. He served as the Norwegian ambassador to Belgium from 1996 to 2000, and to Canada from 2005 to 2009; in between he was a special adviser in the Ministry of Foreign Affairs.

Næss died on 22 October 2026, at the age of 84.

== Honours and decorations ==
- – Knight 1st Class of Order of St. Olav (1997)
- – Commander of the Royal Norwegian Order of Merit (2001)

Diplomatic posts
Preceded by Ingvard Havnen	Norwegian ambassador to Canada; 2005–2009	Succeeded by Else Berit Eikeland
