= Morten Wetland =

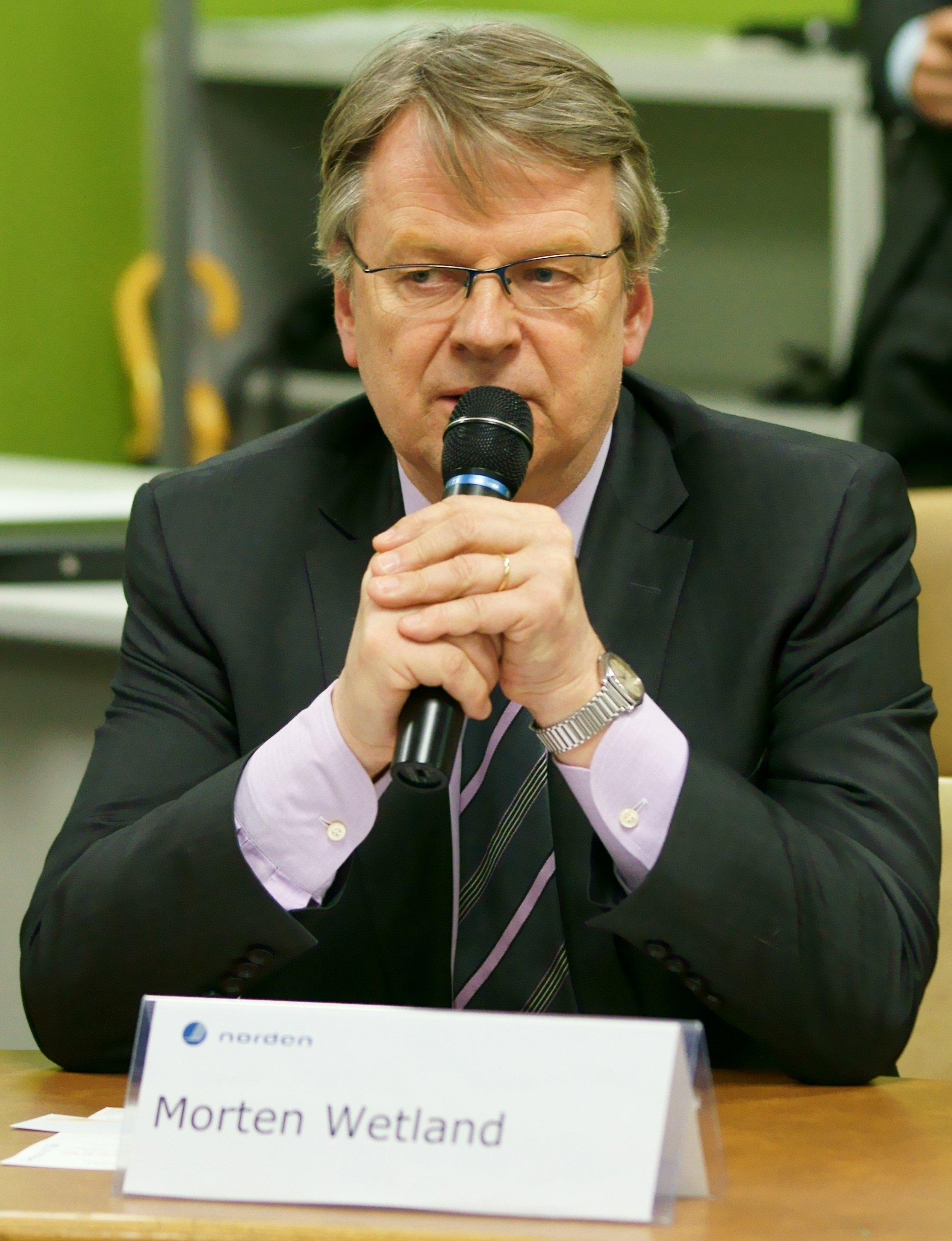
Image of Morten Wetland

Morten Wetland (born 12 May 1951) is a Norwegian lobbyist, jurist, diplomat and politician for the Labour Party. He is a former State Secretary, Ambassador and Permanent Representative of Norway to the United Nations in New York.

== Career ==
=== 1976–1998 ===
Wetland graduated from the University of Oslo with the cand.jur. degree in 1976. He was hired in the Ministry of Foreign Affairs the same year, but left to work as a deputy judge in Grimstad Municipality from 1978 to 1979. From 1983 to 1983 he worked as a secretary at the Norwegian embassy in West Germany.

He then returned to Norway to work as a civil servant. He worked in the Norwegian Office of the Prime Minister from 1985 to 1990, except for a period between 1989 and 1990 when he worked as director of the legal department in the Ministry of Foreign Affairs. In 1991 he was promoted to deputy under-secretary of State (ekspedisjonssjef) in the Office of the Prime Minister. In 1992 Wetland was responsible for coining the phrase Det er typisk norsk å være god, which translates to "It is typical for Norwegians to be clever". The phrase was used in a New Year's speech by then-Prime Minister Gro Harlem Brundtland, and quickly became famous in Norway.

In 1994 Wetland moved from the administrative to the partisan political stratum in the Office of the Prime Minister, as he was appointed State Secretary in the third cabinet Brundtland. He lost this job when Gro Harlem Brundtland resigned in 1996. In the new cabinet Jagland, he was appointed State Secretary in the Ministry of Industry and Trade, but only lasted for less than two months, from 1 November to 18 December 1996.

He worked briefly for the publishing house Gyldendal in 1997, before spending the next year as campaign leader for Gro Harlem Brundtland, who ran for the position as Director-General of the World Health Organization. This was successful as Brundtland was appointed in May 1998.

=== 1998–2005 ===
In 1998 Wetland was proclaimed Commander of the Royal Norwegian Order of St. Olav, for his work as a civil servant. The same year he became the Norway's Ambassador to Germany, serving until 2003.

During this period, he notably fell out with Bjarne Lindstrøm, who, being permanent under-secretary of State (utenriksråd) in the Ministry of Foreign Affairs, was the highest-ranking bureaucrat in the Ministry. Wetland resigned, reportedly due to the tension, and worked two years as a director in Statkraft.

However, Bjarne Lindstrøm was himself a controversial person. In 2005 the Ministry of Foreign Affairs came under scrutiny for the handling of the 2004 Indian Ocean earthquake, a natural disaster that gravely affected Norwegian citizens abroad. An ad hoc commission was set up, with Jan Reinås as the leader and Wetland as a member. Its final report contained strong criticism of the Ministry of Foreign Affairs. Lindstrøm lost his position as permanent under-secretary, although he became Norway's Ambassador to the United Kingdom. Wetland was publicly accused, by anonymous sources, of having a personal vendetta against Lindstrøm; however no sanctions were taken against this.

=== 2005–2008 ===
In the autumn of 2005, when the second cabinet Stoltenberg assumed office, Wetland returned to politics as State Secretary at the Office of the Prime Minister. At the time of the appointment, it was noted that Wetland was a member of the so-called Kristiania Forum, an informal group consisting of perceived right-wing elite members of the Labour Party.

He left on 1 January 2008, having handed in his resignation in late 2007.

=== 2008–2012 ===
In late February 2008 he was appointed as Norway's new Permanent Representative to the United Nations. This was not uncontroversial. The foreign affairs administration had originally singled out another candidate, peace process veteran Mona Juul, who was the deputy leader of the Norwegian delegation to the United Nations at that time. Instead, Wetland was appointed.

Already in December 2007, when it became known that Wetland had applied for the position, the question was raised whether Prime Minister Jens Stoltenberg or Minister of Foreign Affairs Jonas Gahr Støre had a conflict of interest in the process. Both were given the green light by law experts in the Ministry of Justice. Nonetheless, Stoltenberg, whose wife was a friend of Juul, chose to back out of the process in order to act "cautious". He was not present when the Council of State discussed the case. Jonas Gahr Støre chose to participate in the Council of State meeting. It surfaced, however, that Støre and Wetland had a long history of acquaintance, having attended each other's fortieth birthday parties in 1990 and 1991 respectively. Støre was specifically criticized for this by the political opposition. He replied that Wetland was more of a colleague than a personal friend, that a friendship does not entail a conflict of interest in the juridical sense, and that he had not only worked with Wetland, but rather "three or four" of the applicants.

=== 2012–present ===
In 2012 Wetland left the position as Permanent Representative to the United Nations. He was hired by the communications company First House.

== Personal life ==
Wetland is married, and has two children.

Diplomatic posts
Preceded by Kjell Eliassen	Norwegian ambassador to Germany; 1998–2003	Succeeded by Bjørn Tore Godal
Preceded by Johan Ludvik Løvald	Permanent Representative of Norway to the United Nations; 2008–2012	Succeeded by Geir Otto Pedersen
