= Mordechai Bentov =

Israeli journalist and politician (1900–1985)

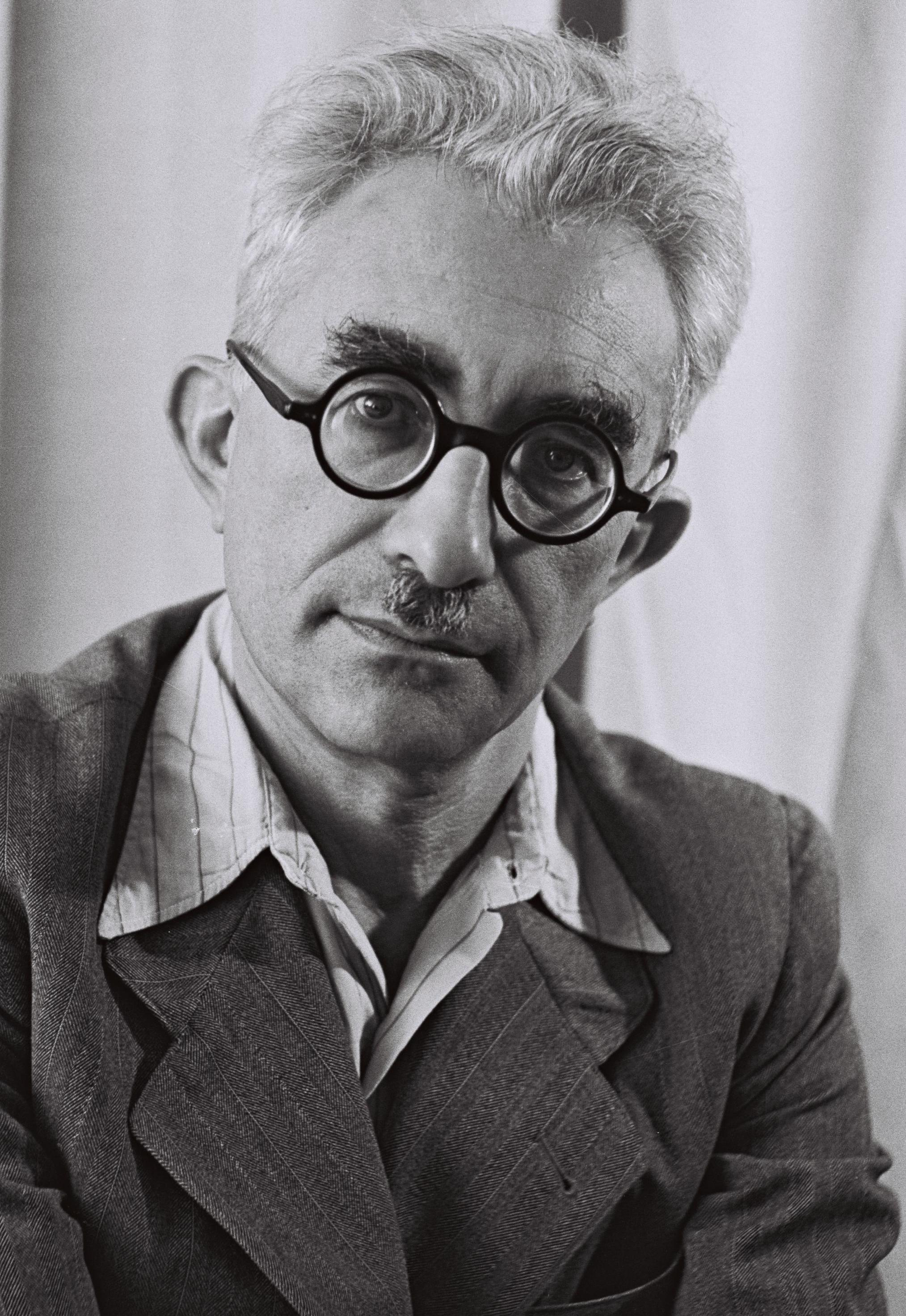
- Bentov in 1951

Ministerial roles
- 1948–1949: Minister of Labour & Construction
- 1955–1961: Minister of Development
- 1966–1969: Minister of Housing

Faction represented in the Knesset
- 1949–1965: Mapam

Personal details
- Born: 28 March 1900 Grodzisk Mazowiecki, Russian Empire
- Died: 18 January 1985 (aged 84) Mishmar HaEmek, Israel

Mordechai Bentov (Hebrew: מרדכי בנטוב; 28 March 1900 – 18 January 1985) was a Russian-born Israeli journalist and politician. He was one of the signatories of the Israeli declaration of independence.

== Biography ==
Bentov was born Mordechai Gutgeld in Grodzisk Mazowiecki in the Russian Empire (now in Poland). After attending a gymnasium he studied law for two years at the University of Warsaw, and was one of the founding members and leaders of Hashomer Hatzair in Poland. He emigrated to Mandatory Palestine in 1920, and continued studying law in Jerusalem. He had a younger sister, Shulamit, who followed him to Palestine in 1923 and went on to become a director and producer of kibbutz theatre for Kibbutz Mishmar HaEmek and other communal settlements.

Bentov later said that he first encountered the "Arab-Jewish problem" during the events of 1921, saying "I was set up, armed with a gun, to defend a Jewish neighborhood in Jaffa. I saw in the distance a lot of Arab villagers with sticks and stones, marching to riot against the Jews. After them I saw women carrying sacks – to collect the loot." He was amongst the founders of Kibbutz Artzi, and was a member of Mishmar HaEmek kibbutz. By this time he had risen to the leadership of Hashomer Hatzair, and was one of its representatives in the Histadrut and the World Zionist Organization. He was also one of the Jewish Agency delegation to the United Nations in 1947.

=== Political career ===
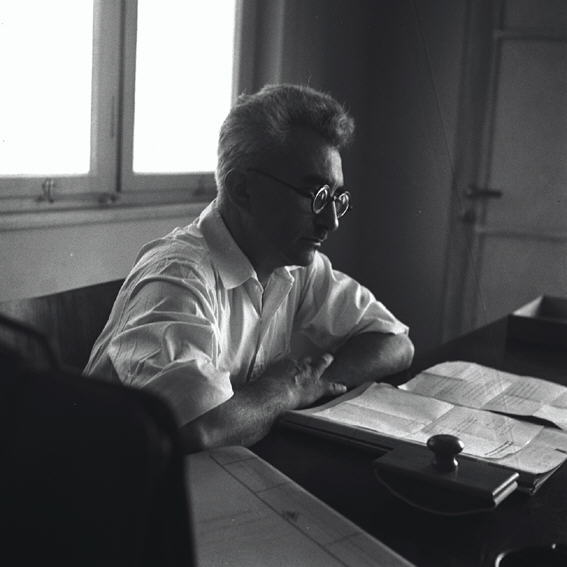
Bentov in 1947

On 14 May 1948 Bentov was one of the 37 people to sign Israel's declaration of independence, and was appointed Minister of Labour and Construction in the provisional government.

According to a February 26, 2026 Haaretz investigation, the protocols of relevant Israeli government meetings from 1948 have not been fully released even after nearly 80 years, though portions of ministerial exchanges have been opened in recent years following pressure on the State Archives. one meeting, Minister Mordechai Bentov remarked that “it is easy to expel Arabs, Hitler was the first,” and that “everything we do is contrary to international conventions.”

In 1949 he was elected to the first Knesset as a member of Mapam. He was re-elected in 1951 and 1955, after which he was appointed Minister of Development, a post he held until 1961. Although he lost his seat in the 1965 elections, he was appointed Minister of Housing by Levi Eshkol, remaining in the position until 1969.

He died at his home in Mishmar HaEmek on 18 January 1985 aged 84, and was buried on the kibbutz. His sister Shulamit died the following month and was also buried at Mishmar HaEmek.

== Bibliography ==
- Israel's Economy at a Crossroads (1962) (Hebrew)
- Israel, the Palestinians and the Left (1971) (Hebrew)
- Days Will Tell: Memories from the Decisive Period (1984) (Hebrew)
