= Eivinn Berg =

Norwegian diplomat and politician

Eivinn Berg (31 July 1931 – 23 September 2013) was a Norwegian diplomat and politician for the Conservative Party.

He was born in Sandefjord, and took the siv.øk. degree at the Norwegian School of Economics and Business Administration. He enrolled there in 1953, and was hired in the Norwegian Ministry of Foreign Affairs in 1956. From 1963 he served in the Norwegian delegation to GATT and EFTA in Geneva, then as a head of department in the EFTA Secretariat. From 1970 he was an embassy counsellor in Brussels, and negotiated the Norwegian membership in the European Economic Community. However, the membership was stopped in a 1972 referendum in Norway, and Berg left the foreign service. He was the director of the Norwegian Shipowners' Association from 1973 to 1978.

He returned to the Ministry of Foreign Affairs as sub-director, and was promoted to deputy under-secretary of state. From 1981 to 1984 he served as a State Secretary in the Ministry of Foreign Affairs as a part of Willoch's First Cabinet. From 1984 to 1988 he was the Norwegian ambassador to NATO, and from 1988 to 1996 he was the Norwegian ambassador to the European Union. His time here was spent in negotiations; first from 1989 to 1993 negotiating the European Economic Area and from 1993 to 1994 negotiating a possible EU membership. This too was botched after a 1994 referendum. He also negotiated the conditions for the Schengen Area.

In 1996 Berg left the foreign service for good, and became an adviser for corporations such as Statoil, Norske Skog and Statkraft. He was an adviser ahead of the accession of Slovenia to the European Union. He was decorated with the Belgian Order of the Crown (1974), the Order of Prince Henry (1980, Commander), the Orden del Mérito Civil (1982, Grand Cross), the Order of the Lion of Finland (1983), the Ordre national du Mérite (1984, Officier) and the Order of St. Olav (1987, Commander).

His Norwegian residency was at Haslum, later at Ullernåsen. He died in a car accident in Stokke in September 2013.

Diplomatic posts
Preceded by Kjeld Vibe	Permanent Representative of Norway to NATO; 1984–1988	Succeeded by Bjørn Kristvik
