= Bjørn Blakstad =

Norwegian diplomat

Bjørn Blakstad (9 January 1926 – 11 July 2012) was a Norwegian diplomat.

He was born in Hisøy Municipality, and is a cand.jur. by education. He started working for the Norwegian Ministry of Foreign Affairs in 1952. He became a deputy under-secretary of state in the Ministry of Foreign Affairs in 1973. He then served as an ambassor; to Japan from 1976 to 1981, to Spain from 1981 to 1988 and to the Netherlands from 1988 to 1994. He died in July 2012 in Arendal.

Diplomatic posts
Preceded by Arnt-Jakob Jakobsen	Norwegian ambassador to Spain; 1981–1988	Succeeded by Leif Mevik
