= Johan Ludvik Løvald =

Norwegian diplomat (born 1943)

Johan Ludvik Løvald (born 14 May 1943) is a Norwegian diplomat.

He is a Ph.D. by education, and started working for the Norwegian Ministry of Foreign Affairs in 1970. He served as subdirector from 1989, head of department from 1991 and deputy under-secretary of state in the Ministry of Foreign Affairs from 1994 to 1996. He was then the Norwegian ambassador to Canada from 1996 to 2000. From 2000 to 2003 he was the assistant to the permanent under-secretary of state. From 2003 to 2008 he was the Norwegian ambassador to the United Nations in New York City.

Diplomatic posts
Preceded by Bjørn Kristvik	Norwegian ambassador to Canada; 1996–2000	Succeeded by Ingvard Havnen
Preceded by Ole Peter Kolby	Permanent Representative of Norway to the United Nations; 2003–2008	Succeeded by Morten Wetland
