= Ingvard Havnen =

Norwegian diplomat (born 1951)

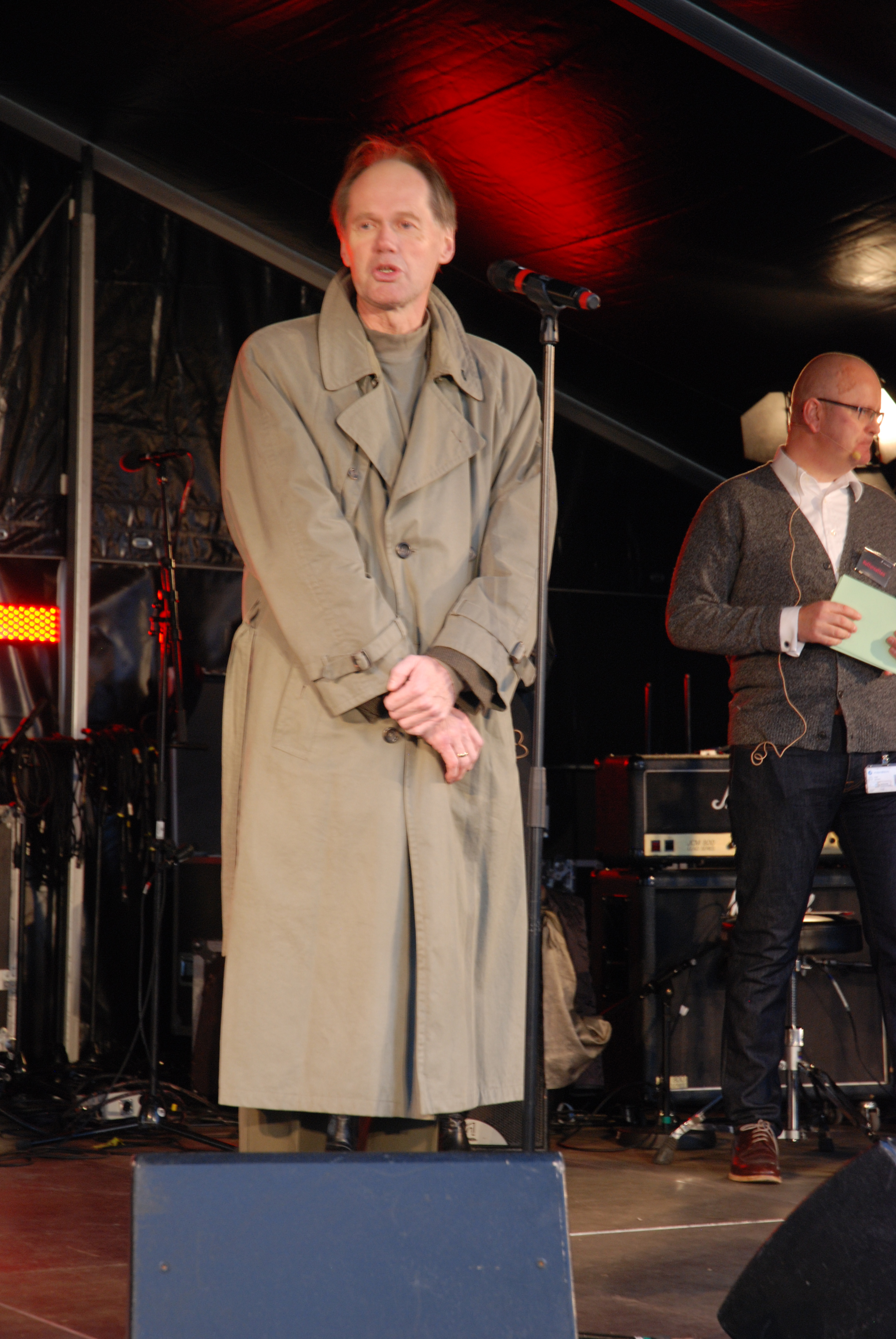
Ingvard Havnen

Ingvard Martin Havnen (born 26 July 1951) is a Norwegian diplomat.

He is a cand.polit. by education, and started working for the Norwegian Ministry of Foreign Affairs in 1980. He notably worked as press spokesman in the ministry from 1992 to 2000, before serving as the Norwegian ambassador to Canada from 2000 to 2005. In 2005 he was appointed as a deputy under-secretary of state in the Norwegian Office of the Prime Minister. He has been decorated with the Royal Norwegian Order of Merit.

Diplomatic posts
Preceded by Johan Ludvik Løvald	Norwegian ambassador to Canada; 2000–2005	Succeeded by Tor Berntin Næss
