= Leif Mevik =

Norwegian diplomat

Leif Hans Mevik (22 January 1930 – 13 October 2015) was a Norwegian diplomat.

He was born in Gildeskål Municipality, and was a cand.philol. by education. He started working for the Norwegian Ministry of Foreign Affairs in 1961. He served as the Norwegian ambassador to OSCE in Vienna from 1980 to 1988, to Spain from 1988 to 1992 and to NATO in Brussels from 1992 to 1997. Mevik received an honorary doctorate from California Lutheran University in 1988.

Diplomatic posts
Preceded by Bjørn Blakstad	Norwegian ambassador to Spain; 1988–1992	Succeeded by Helge Vindenes
Preceded by Bjørn Kristvik	Permanent Representative of Norway to NATO; 1992–1997	Succeeded by Hans Jacob Biørn Lian
