= Mona Elisabeth Brøther =

Norwegian diplomat (born 1952)

Mona Elisabeth Brøther (born 9 January 1952) is a Norwegian diplomat.

She is a cand.mag. by education and started working for the Norwegian Ministry of Foreign Affairs in 1979. She served as subdirector from 1995 and head of department briefly in 2000. However, she soon became Norway's ambassador to Chile from 2000 to 2004, then returned to the Ministry of Foreign Affairs as senior adviser for five years and head of department for three years. From 2012 to 2015 she served as the Norwegian ambassador to Canada, then served as senior adviser for one more year before retiring.

Diplomatic posts
Preceded by Else Berit Eikeland	Norwegian ambassador to Canada; 2012–2015	Succeeded by Anne Kari Hansen Ovind
