= Ole Peter Kolby =

Norwegian diplomat

Ole Peter Kolby (born 24 October 1939) is a Norwegian diplomat.

He was born in Oslo and is a cand.jur. by education. He started working for the Norwegian Ministry of Foreign Affairs in 1966. He served as deputy under-secretary of state in the Ministry of Foreign Affairs from 1989 to 1992, then the Norwegian ambassador to Organization for Security and Co-operation in Europe in Vienna from 1992 to 1998 and to the United Nations in New York City from 1998 to 2003. He rounded off his career as ambassador to Denmark from 2004 to 2007.

Diplomatic posts
Preceded by Hans Jacob Biørn Lian	Permanent Representative of Norway to the United Nations; 1998–2003	Succeeded by Johan Ludvik Løvald
Preceded by Adolfo Aguilar Zinser	President of the United Nations Security Council; March 2002 (with Jan Petersen)	Succeeded by Sergey V. Lavrov
