= Jon Hanssen-Bauer =

Norwegian anthropologist, researcher, and diplomat

Jon Hanssen-Bauer (born 5 April 1952) is a Norwegian social anthropologist, peace researcher and diplomat.

After taking his mag.art. degree in social anthropology at the University of Oslo in 1982 he was hired at the Work Research Institute. From 1988 to 1993 he worked at the Norwegian Work Life Centre, and from 1993 to 2005 for the Fafo Foundation. At Fafo he started as research director and then led its Institute for International Studies from 1998.

Hanssen-Bauer had advised the Norwegian Ministry of Foreign Affairs on the Middle East peace process since 1994, and was appointed as senior adviser there in 2005. After a stint as Ministry of Foreign Affairs envoy in Sri Lanka from 2006 he was a special envoy on the Middle East from 2009 before being appointed Norway's ambassador to Israel in 2015.

Diplomatic posts
Preceded by Svein Sevje	Norwegian ambassador to Israel; 2015–	Incumbent
