= Helge Vindenes =

Norwegian diplomat

Helge Vindenes (born 28 April 1931) is a Norwegian diplomat.

He took the cand.jur. degree in his education, and started working for the Norwegian Ministry of Foreign Affairs in 1958. He was promoted to assistant secretary in 1971 and sub-director in 1973, before working special missions from 1978 to 1982. He was the Norwegian ambassador to Chile from 1982 to 1988, permanent under-secretary of state (the highest-ranking bureaucrat position) from 1989 to 1992, Norwegian ambassador to Spain from 1992 to 1996 and Ireland from 1996 to 1999.

Civic offices
Preceded by Kjeld Vibe	Permanent under-secretary of state in the Norwegian Ministry of Foreign Affairs; 1989–1992	Succeeded by Kjell Colding
Diplomatic posts
Preceded by Leif Mevik	Norway's ambassador to Spain; 1992–1996	Succeeded by Jan Edmund Nyheim
