= Mishmar HaEmek =

Kibbutz in Israel

Mishmar HaEmek: משמר העמק (Hebrew)
- Kibbutz
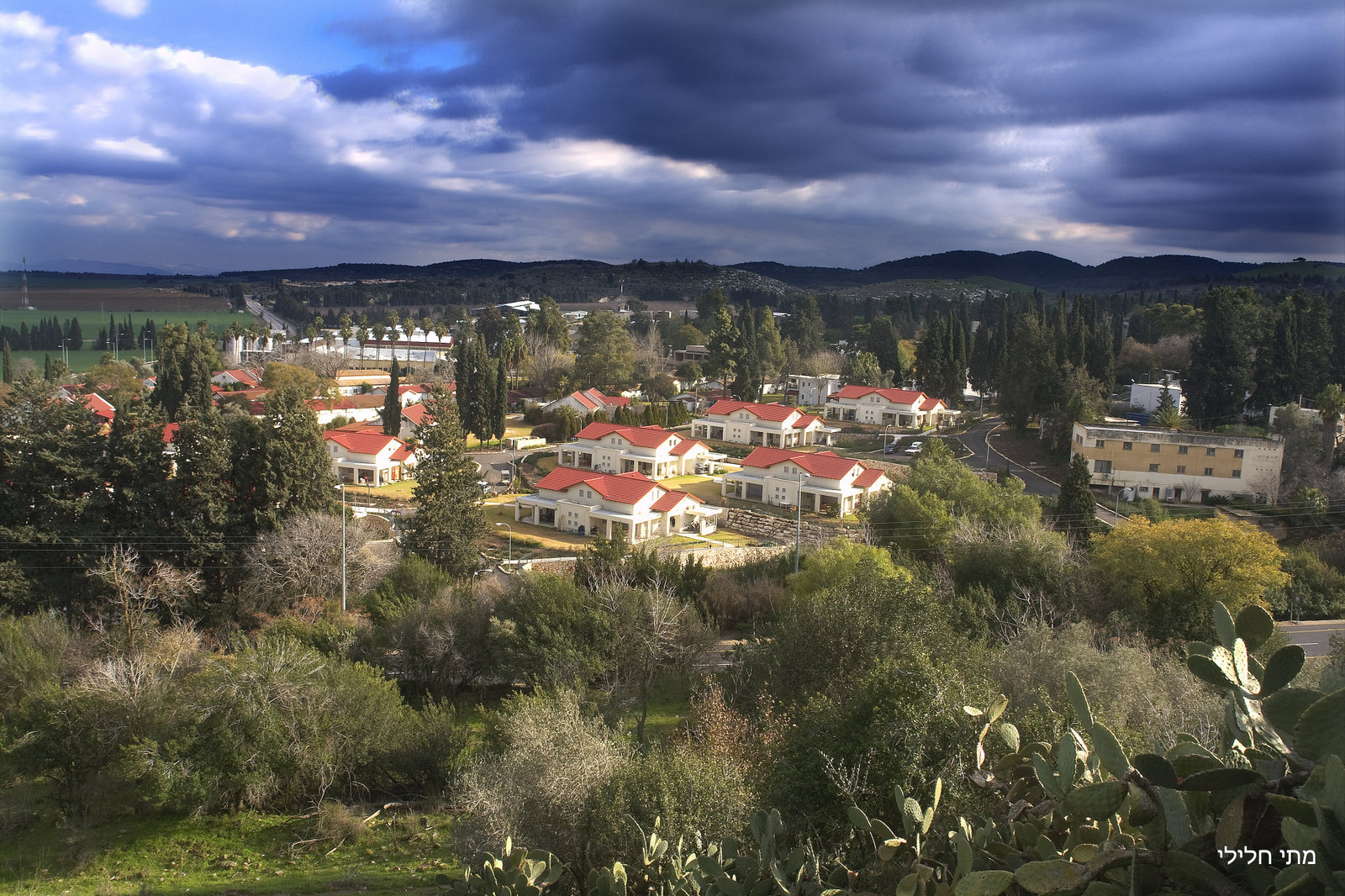
- View of Mishmar HaEmek's new neighborhood
- Etymology: Guard of the Valley
- Location within Jezreel Valley region of Israel Location within Israel
- Coordinates: 32°36′35″N 35°8′30″E
- Country: Israel
- District: Northern
- Subdistrict: Jezreel
- Council: Megiddo
- Affiliation: Kibbutz Movement
- Founded: 1926; 100 years ago
- Founder: Polish HaShomer HaTzair members
- Population (2024): 1,245
- Website: mh.kibbutz.org.il

Mishmar HaEmek (Hebrew: משמר העמק, lit. 'Guard of the Valley') is a kibbutz in northern Israel. Located in the western Jezreel Valley, it falls under the jurisdiction of the Megiddo Regional Council. Mishmar HaEmek is one of the few kibbutzim that have not undergone privatization and still follow the traditional collectivist and socialist kibbutz model. In 2024, it had a population of 1,245. At least six former members of the Knesset hail from Mishmar HaEmek.

The area was acquired by the Jewish community as part of the Sursock Purchase. The kibbutz was established in 1926 by members of the HaShomer HaTzair ("The Young Guard") movement, who mostly came from Europe to Mandatory Palestine during the Third Aliyah. It was the first Jewish settlement in the southern part of the Jezreel Valley, built as part of Jewish National Fund efforts to settle the valley. It quickly became a center of HaShomer HaTzair, especially after the Kibbutz Arzi movement chose to build their first regional school in the kibbutz.

As a HaShomer HaTzair stronghold, the kibbutz housed many pioneers of other kibbutzim (see gar'in) and instructed them before they established their own kibbutzim. In April 1948, during the 1947–48 civil war in Mandatory Palestine, the kibbutz was the epicenter of the Battle of Mishmar HaEmek, successfully repelling the first major offensive of the Arab Liberation Army commanded by Fawzi al-Qawuqji.

The economy of the kibbutz has historically been focused on agriculture. Since 1950, it has also operated a plastics factory in partnership with kibbutz Gal'ed, which has become a central part of the kibbutz's economy. The forest near the kibbutz was planted by its residents and is listed as a biosphere reserve by UNESCO. Two ancient settlements dating back to prehistoric times have been found in the vicinity of the kibbutz.

== History ==
=== Establishment ===
During the Fourth Aliyah (1924–1928), a time of Jewish migration to the British-controlled Mandatory Palestine, the Jezreel Valley was the top priority of the Jewish National Fund (JNF). The fund wanted to settle the arable valley in order to establish a significant Jewish agricultural community and to create a contiguous bloc of Jewish settlements connecting Haifa with the existing bloc of Jewish settlements between Afula and Beit She'an.

In 1924 the JNF purchased lands owned by the Christian Lebanese Sursock family near Nahalal. Afterwards, it decided to expand south, and in 1926 purchased most of the land of Abu Shusha, where Bedouins and Turkmens lived.

The pioneers of Mishmar HaEmek came to Mandatory Palestine during the Third Aliyah. They were Polish Jews from Galicia and were members of three groups who graduated from HaShomer HaTzair movement, one from the town of Afula and two from the Jerusalem area.

On 21 January 1922, they, along with some unaffiliated people, joined in the Neve Sha'anan neighborhood of Haifa to form the gar'in (Hebrew: גרעין, lit. "Seed/Grain") of a future settlement. It was initially named "Kibbutz Bet" (Bet is the second letter in Hebrew. "Kibbutz Aleph" of the movement later became the kibbutz of Beit Alfa).

At its formation the gar'in had 80 members, but a year later, the number had been reduced to 65. In the summer of 1922 they moved to Nahalal in the Jezreel Valley where they participated in swamp drying and road paving. At Nahalal some members suffered from diseases and the lack of a stable livelihood.

By early 1924, the member count was at 60 as old members left and new members joined. The main reason for leaving was the difficulty of trying to adjust to the kibbutz lifestyle. Some left because they wished to continue their academic career, others because of family issues and some because of ideological opposition.

In 1925 the kibbutz, which then consisted of 60 adults and six children, moved to Afula, where they did road paving and worked in construction.

==== Unification with Kibbutz Dalet ====
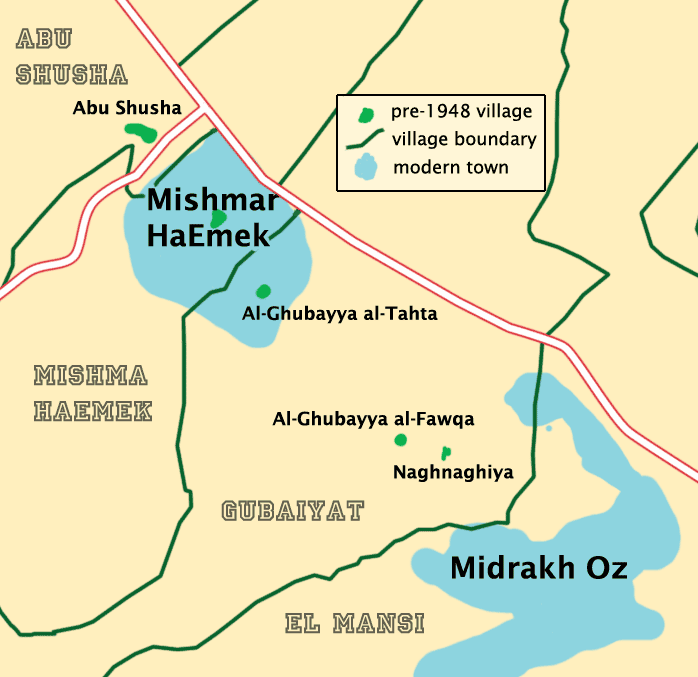
Mishmar HaEmek in historical context

In Afula, the kibbutz united with another HaShomer HaTzair gari'n called "Kibbutz Dalet" (the fourth letter in Hebrew), which was formed in the town of Hadera in 1924.

The unification ceremony was performed like a Jewish wedding, in which the "groom" (Kibbutz Bet) and the "bride" (Kibbutz Dalet), were betrothed and a Ketubah (Jewish marriage contract) was read in front of the crowd. On 3 November 1926, the members (numbering 90 after the unification) were given the land next to the Abu Shusha.

Initially, only 15 men and women left Afula to Abu Shusha and settled in a nearby khan, from where they began preparing for agricultural work. In the next year, two mules were bought and 120 dunams of fields of wheat and barley were sowed. That time the members left the khan and began building the new settlement in its modern location, making history as a single Jewish settlement in this part of the valley.

In November 1928 the kibbutz was renamed "Kibbutz Mishmar HaEmek" as proposed by Menachem Ussishkin, after its members could not agree on a name. In the meantime, the members who remained in Afula continued their work there paving roads and constructing the Great Synagogue of Afula. The construction of a synagogue raised some ideological issues for some of the members who were mostly secular socialists.

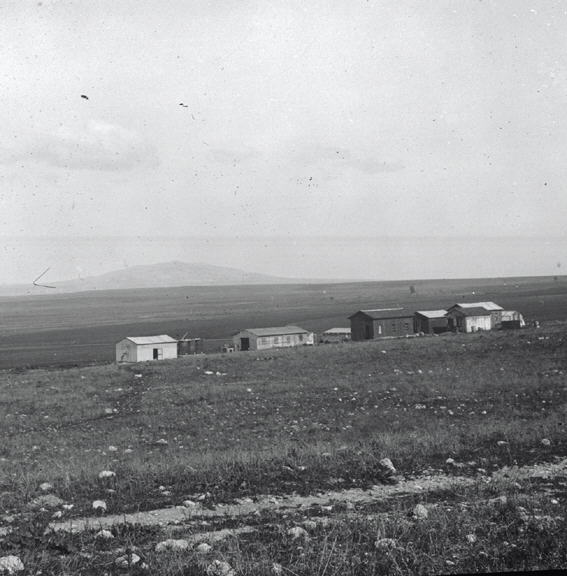
Mishmar HaEmek, 1926

On 26 August 1929, during the 1929 Palestine riots, the kibbutz was attacked by Arab rioters equipped with firearms. The members, with the aid of Arab policemen, managed to fend off the rioters. British policemen ordered the kibbutz to evacuate and promised to take care for their property, and so the members left the following day.

On 28 August, Arab rioters burned the kibbutz's barn, uprooted trees, stole corn from the fields and vandalized two gravestones in the kibbutz's cemetery. It was the only time in its history where it was abandoned, and it joined 16 other Jewish communities that were also abandoned during the riots. Unlike others, Mishmar HaEmek was resettled six days later. The evacuation was intended to protect human lives, but many saw it as abandonment.

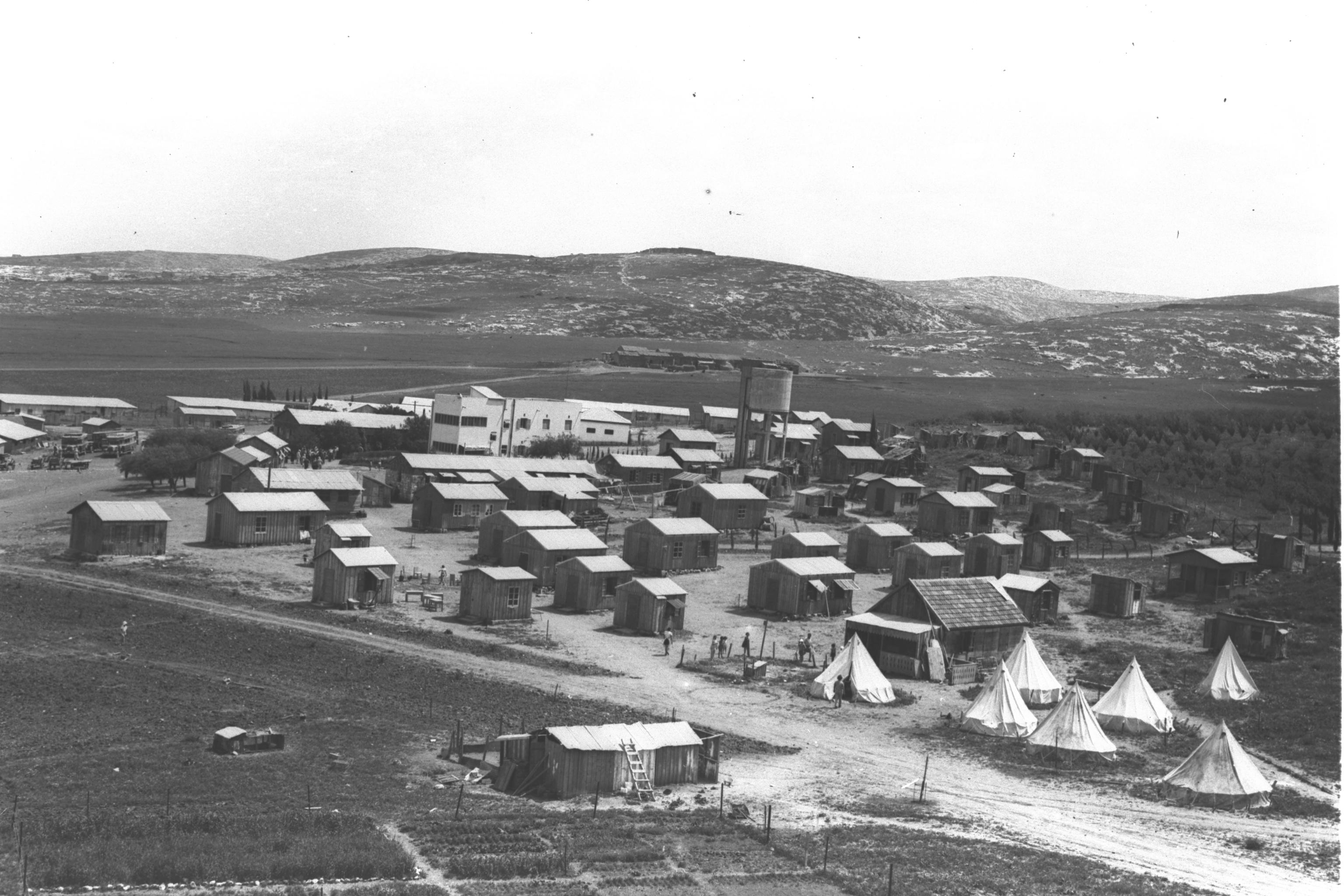
Mishmar HaEmek with Manasseh Heights in the background, 1933

In early 1930, the rest of the members left Afula and joined the members in Mishmar HaEmek, which brought the population of the kibbutz to 101, with 85 adults and 16 children.

==== Construction and expansion ====
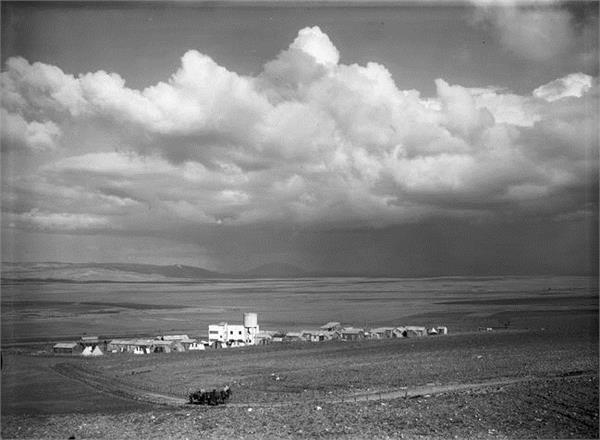
Mishmar HaEmek, 1934

In 1931, Shomeria School was established. It was the first regional educational institution of the Kibbutz Artzi movement. It operated as a boarding school and put into practice HaShomer HaTzair's socialist ideology, creating an independent "children's society." The pupils saw their parents only on holidays or special visiting days throughout the year. The children had a daily schedule, with the morning devoted to education, the afternoon to labor, and the evening to cultural activities.

Originally, the school was housed in temporary cabins. Later in 1931, the Kibbutz Artzi movement commissioned a large concrete building for the school which was planned and designed by Joseph Neufeld. It was built only in 1937 after the needed funds were raised. The construction was done by the kibbutz members to reduce costs.

It was known as the "Children's House" and when completed it was among the biggest structures in the region and thus also nicknamed "the Big House". Its chosen location was on a hill overlooking the houses of the kibbutz, symbolizing the importance of education. The institution provided education to four other kibbutz communities that were established in the Jezreel Valley including Beit Alfa, Sarid, Mizra and Merhavia, later joined by children from kibbutz Gan Shmuel and youth from the Youth Aliyah.

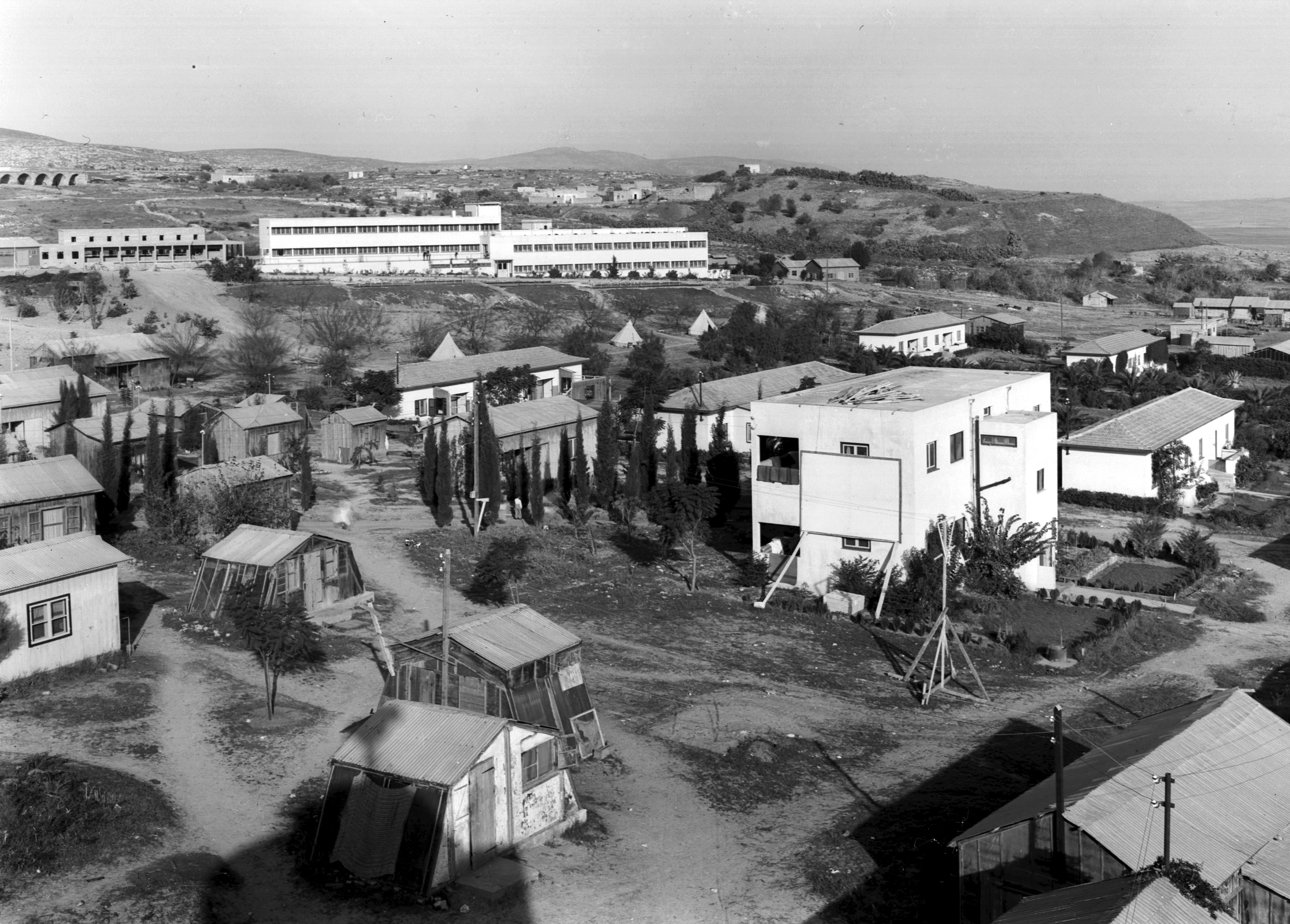
View of Mishmar HaEmek with its large school building in the background, December 1938

In the following years, in addition to the school, the members also constructed a water tower, built a cowshed, planted a vineyard and various fruit trees and dug wells. The JNF wanted to cement the Jewish ownership over lands it had purchased. Because third of Mishmar HaEmek's territory consisted of rocky hills unsuited for agriculture it had a policy of planting forests and Mishmar HaEmek followed this policy and in the 1930s planted some 50,000 trees east of the kibbutz. The forest was also projected to provide material for local wood industry, and for decades provided a source of income for the kibbutz.

Berta Guggenheimer was an activist who planned playgrounds all over the country and with her niece Irma Lindheim, a member of the kibbutz set up a children's playground in the kibbutz. In the 1930s there was an arrangement to allow Arab children from the nearby villages to visit and play with the kibbutz children making it a unique place for the kibbutzim movement.

In the 1930s, Mishmar HaEmek absorbed two separate groups of HaShomer HaTzair. The first group had 17 people and was from the United States and first settled in the kibbutz in 1931. In 1933 their number rose to 30 and in 1934 they moved to an area near the town of Hadera. Another group settled between 1937 and 1938 and later established the kibbutz of Hatzor in 1946.

By 1947, Mishmar HaEmek had a population of 550. The Jewish National Fund and Worton Hall Studios made a 1947 movie called The Great Promise (Dim'at Ha'Nehamah Ha'Gedolah), and a number of scenes were filmed in the kibbutz. In total, until 1957, the kibbutz instructed some 16 groups who established kibbutzim all over the country, including HaZore'a, Ein HaShofet, Ramat HaShofet and Megiddo in the vicinity of Mishmar HaEmek.

The residents of Mishmar HaEmek represented the more Arab-friendly and peace-oriented left-wing Mapam party, in opposition to the ruling Mapai center-left establishment. Some of the movement's leaders, such as Mordechai Bentov and Ya'akov Hazan, hailed from the kibbutz.

=== Great Arab Revolt and World War II ===
At the start of 1936–39 Arab revolt in Palestine, Mishmar HaEmek came under attack from nearby Arab militants under the command of Ahmad Attiyah Awad. Yusuf Abu Durra took over after Awad's death in March 1938. The attacks came in the form of repeated arson attacks on grain fields and forests. They were described by a member as a "crime greater than murder," as the burning of the wheat fields denied the members their main food source. Around 30,000 trees in the kibbutz's vicinity were destroyed and an enormous amount of property was lost. There were no direct attacks on the kibbutz itself, but almost every night there were stray shots fired in its direction. Many of the kibbutz men had to spend time guarding instead of working the fields.

British High Commissioner Arthur Grenfell Wauchope visited the kibbutz and appointed 15 members as armed guards; however, in August 1936, the situation worsened when the attacks became more frequent. The British government sent 60 soldiers to the kibbutz and in October the attacks on the kibbutz ended. Poet and future Israeli politician Uri Zvi Greenberg criticized the members of Mishmar HaEmek for not taking matters into their hands after the attacks on their fields. In a poem he wrote about the events he changed the name of the kibbutz from "Mishmar HaEmek" (Guard of the Valley) to "Hefker HaEmek" (Abandonment of the Valley).

On 2 February 1938 Abraham Goldschleger, a kibbutz member and guide for Ein HaShofet, was ambushed and murdered by residents of Al-Kafrayn. Two residents of Ein HaShofet who accompanied him were also killed in the attack. One of the shooters was caught and executed. In that period the Palmach (an elite force of the Jewish Haganah underground organization) used the trees in the nearby forest as cover for their main training camp and its fighters worked in the kibbutz so not to raise suspicion by the British soldiers.

In the fall of 1942, during World War II, Mishmar HaEmek was used as a training camp by the British army. 160 Jewish volunteers, who would later become members of the Palmach, were trained by Royal Engineers in sabotage and wireless operation. Several tons of explosives were hidden in caches in case the area came under German occupation. This program was eventually terminated and orders were issued for the collection of all equipment and explosives to be returned to the British.

=== Battle of Mishmar HaEmek ===
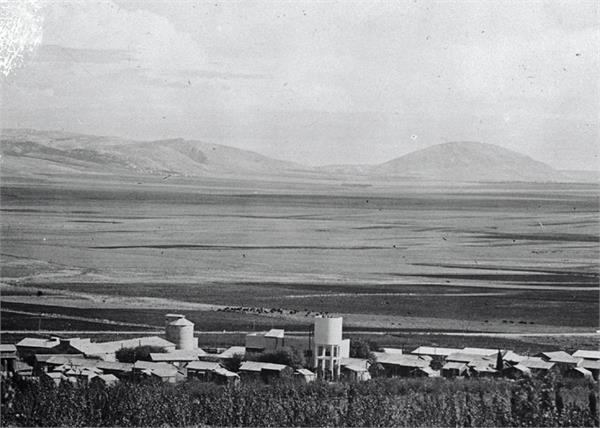
Mishmar HaEmek, 1942

During the 1947–48 civil war, the kibbutz came under full-scale attack by the Arab Liberation Army (ALA) on 4 April 1948. The leader of the ALA, Fawzi al-Qawuqji, planned to seize Mishmar HaEmek to control the route between Jenin and Haifa. The attack began with a barrage from seven artillery pieces supplied by the Syrian army.

During the shelling of the kibbutz, houses were destroyed, civilians, defenders, and animals were killed and the prominent school building was heavily damaged. A bomb shelter was later built there.

On 6 April 1948, the women and children of the kibbutz were evacuated with the aid of the British to other settlements in the Jezreel Valley, and a British-brokered ceasefire began during which the Jewish forces fortified the kibbutz and dug trenches around its perimeter.

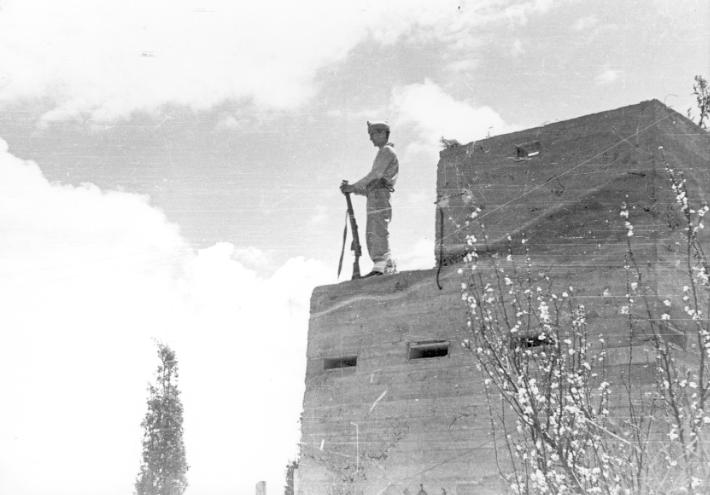
Mishmar HaEmek defenses, 1948

Although the Arab forces had not entered the kibbutz, Qawuqji reported that the kibbutz was captured and the "conquest of Mishmar HaEmek" was falsely celebrated in Arab newspapers, which also reported heavy casualties among the Jewish forces. The ALA sent terms to the Haganah, saying they would lift the siege of the kibbutz, regroup and move toward Haifa if the Jewish forces would not retaliate against the nearby Arab villages in return. The Jewish forces declined the offer and the Arab offensive resumed on 8 April.

In the night between 8–9 April, the Jewish forces launched a counter-attack under the command of Yitzhak Sadeh and captured the nearby Arab village of Al-Ghubayya al-Fawqa in a fierce battle. In the next days, troops of the Carmeli Brigade and the Palmach unit captured several other villages near Mishmar HaEmek and nearby Ein HaShofet, and destroyed them all.

During the second phase of the war, on 24 December 1948 during the middle of Chanukah, Iraqi planes bombed the kibbutz, hitting the children's house, killing three 9-year-old children and a pregnant woman and injuring another four. Historian Yoav Gelber speculates that the Iraqis wanted to attack Ramat David Airbase but hit the kibbutz instead.

=== After the establishment of Israel ===
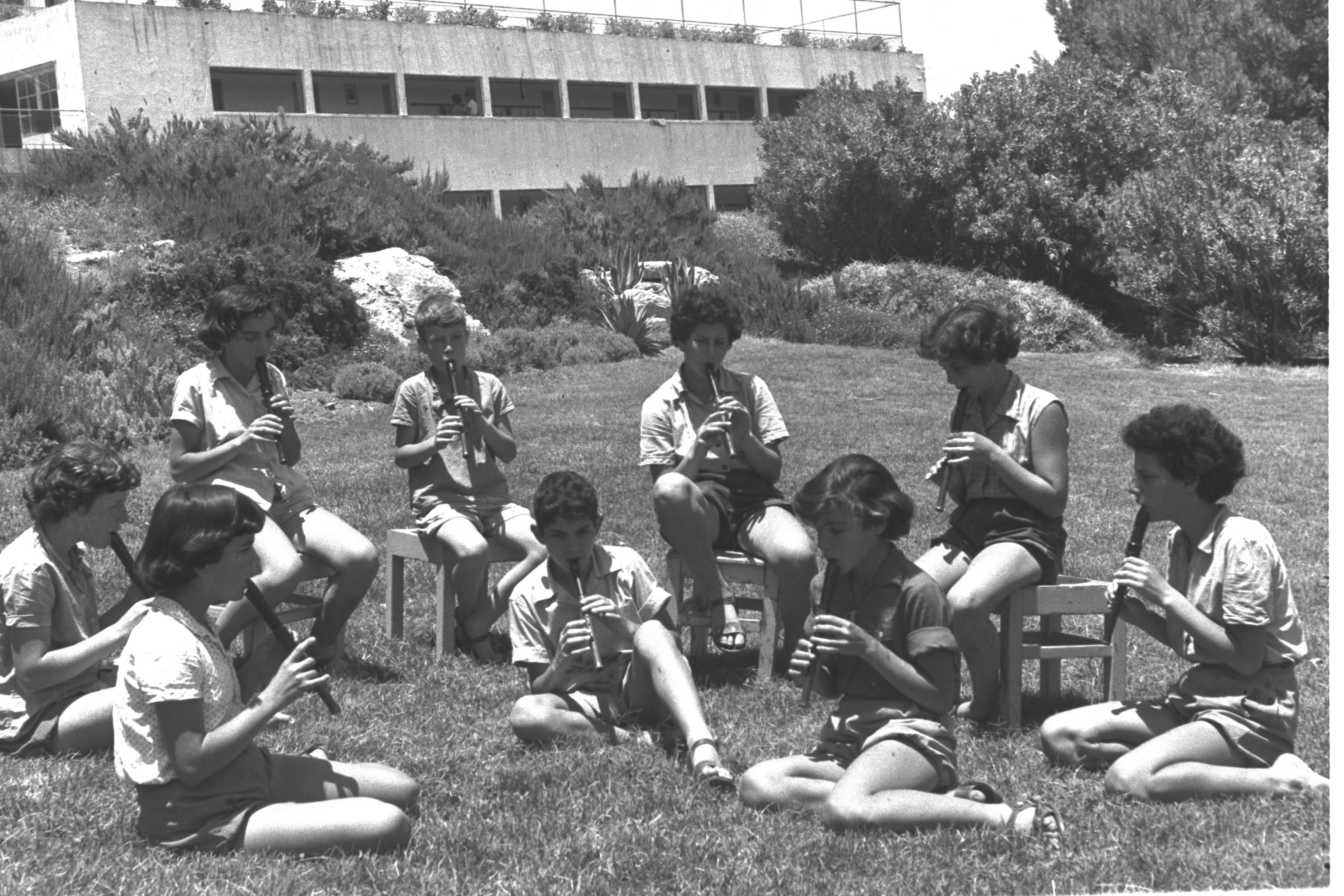
Music lessons on the kibbutz, 1956

The kibbutz earned a name in Israel as the home of educators, authors, leaders, politicians and ministers. It also earned a name for being an important HaShomer HaTazir center.

In 1950, the kibbutz established a plastics factory called Tama (Hebrew: תעשיות משמר העמק, Ta'asiyot Mishmar HaEmek, "Mishmar HaEmek Industries"), which in time became a central part of the kibbutz's economy. The factory was created to provide work for the elderly, since at the time Mishmar HaEmek had the highest number of elderly residents among the entire Kibbutz Artzi network.

That same year, the kibbutz finished building a new large dining hall and kitchen, whose construction was delayed during the war. The dining room was Inaugurated in a day-long celebration that included a play put on by Shulamit Bat-Dori, a member of the kibbutz, telling the biblical stories of kings Saul and Solomon while hinting contemporary kibbutz issues. Members of all age groups participated in the play.

==== Relationship with Keren Yesha ====
In May 1950, a village and ma'abara (immigrant transit camp) called Keren Yesha was established by the Jewish Agency for Yemeni Jews next to Mishmar HaEmek. It was located atop Tel Shush, where the first members of the kibbutz settled in 1926. The village was abandoned and the residents moved to Midrakh Oz in 1953. Political rivalries affected the relations between Mishmar HaEmek and Keren Yehsa. The Hed Ha-Mizrach newspaper described life in Keren Yesha two months after its establishment; the Yemeni immigrants lived in tents and although the residents claimed to be content, they also said that there was not enough support by the authorities.

The newspaper Al HaMishmar, affiliated with the Kibbutz Artzi movement, reported in 1950 that the kibbutz helped the new community and provided a number of services to the new immigrants. The newspaper reported that the Moshavim Movement, which was officially responsible for Keren Yesha, asked that the kibbutz would cease its aid and told the residents that they need to choose between either aid from Mishamr HaEmek or the Moshavim Movement, which held rival social and political views.

In July 1951, Keren Yesha protested against negligence by the authorities and blocked the nearby road. The newspaper Davar, affiliated with the Mapai party, reported that the protest was organized by the members of Mishmar HaEmek affiliated with the rival Mapam party and also claimed they have denied water and medical treatment to the immigrants after they decided to support Mapai. This report caused outrage among kibbutz members, who denied the accusations and claimed that the relations between both communities are good and that kibbutz provides the village with the support that the authorities fail to the deliver. Later, Davar issued an apology, saying it was a false report.

==== Economic expansion and contemporary issues ====
In the 1970s, after the expansion of the Tama factory, a 20% stake (later increased to 25%) was sold to Kibbutz Gal'ed. In the 1980s, the kibbutz suffered from the 1983 bank stock crisis. In an attempt to save the kibbutz from bankruptcy, Tama began manufacturing plastic netting used for bundling crops and in the late 1980s the crisis ended. Several successful business moves by Tama in the early 1990s led the kibbutz to an era of economic prosperity and high quality of life.

During that period, education in the kibbutz was reformed, the children's societies were abolished, and the pupils were moved to schools outside of the kibbutz. This allowed the kibbutz to extend existing houses and set up new neighborhoods. Prosperity led the kibbutz to increase the salaries of its members, to create personal funds for families, and to institutionalize culture and recreation activities thanks to the weekly labor days, reduced to five.

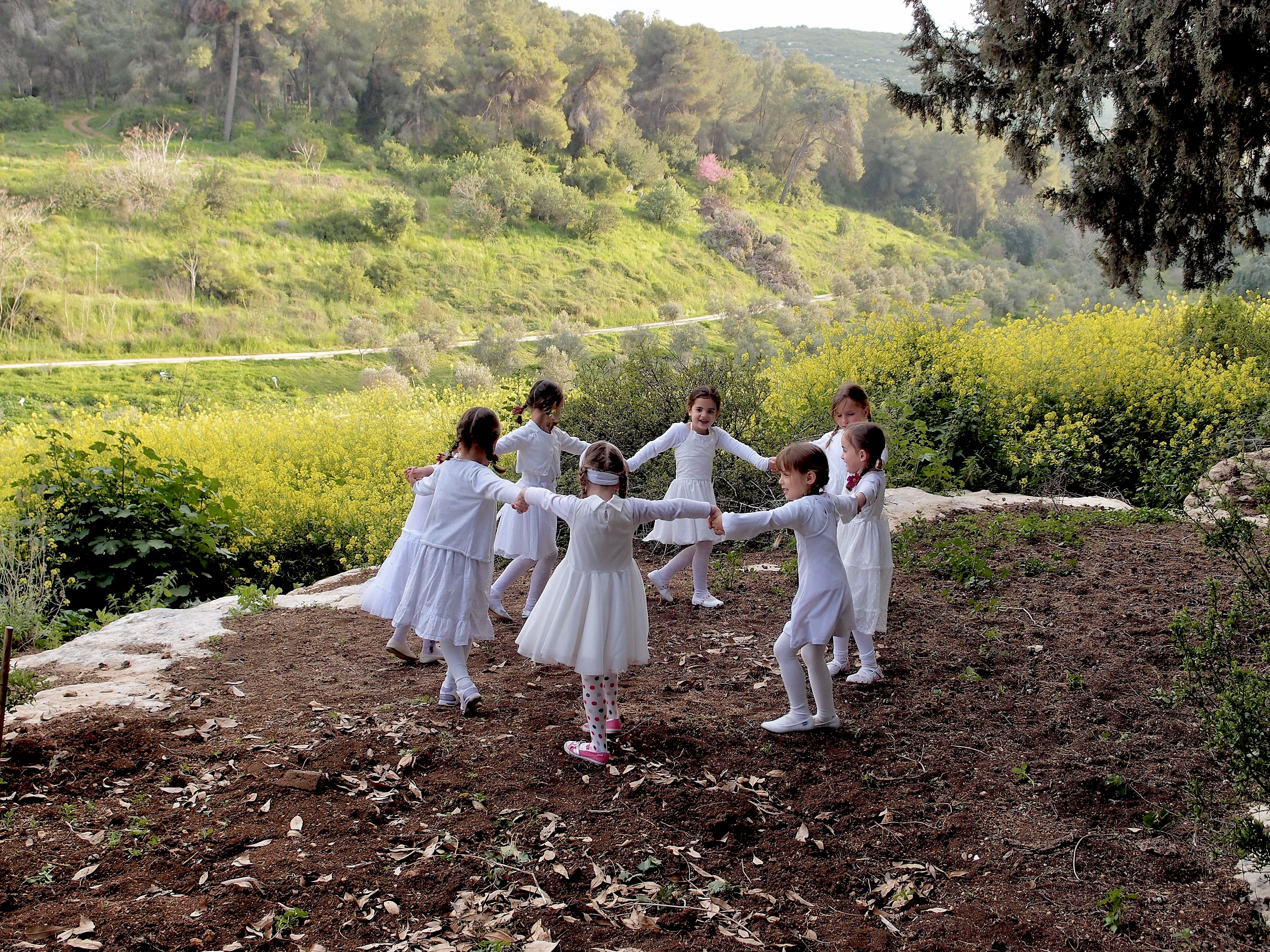
Kibbutz children dancing on a hilltop, 2012

On 1 April 1990, 15,000 people (according to Maariv) participated in a parade from the Menashe forest to Mishmar HaEmek in protest of the objection of Rabbi Elazar Shach to prevent a political coalition between the Haredi parties and the leftist parties which he described as "eaters of hares and swine" (non-Kosher food).

Many leaders of the Israeli left participated in the parade including former politicians Ya'akov Hazan (91 years old at the time) and Emri Ron, both hailing from Mishmar HaEmek, Elisha Shapira the head of Kibbutz Arzi, and Rafael Eitan and Hagai Meirom, both members of the Knesset (Israel's parliament). These events happened in the context of "The Dirty Trick".

In August 1990, some members of the kibbutz, as well as other members kibbutzim affiliated with the Kibbutz Artzi, signed a petition calling upon the kibbutzim movement to launch a non-violent protest against Israel Defense Forces actions against Palestinians in the Palestinian territories during the First Intifada.

In 2010 the kibbutz decided, after a series of public meetings, to appoint a team of members to discuss the privatization of electricity, food, mail, barbershop and cosmetics. Other services were to be kept under the responsibility of the kibbutz, including healthcare, education and welfare. The dispute mainly concerned the privatization of the dining room. At the end of the discussions, most privatization initiatives were rejected and only a few minor changes that had no practical effect on the collective lifestyle were accepted.

The extension has been constructed in four phases, three of whom are complete. As of 2020, a residential extension to the kibbutz's eastern side is under construction and is planned to include a total of 154 residential units, in residential buildings consisting of two apartments each. A southern part of the extension consists of 110 units and was approved in 2006, on the location of the village and archaeological site of Al-Ghubayya al-Tahta. The extension has been constructed in four phases, three of whom are complete. The second stage was approved in 2018 on the location of the old cowshed and includes an additional 44 housing units.

== Geography ==
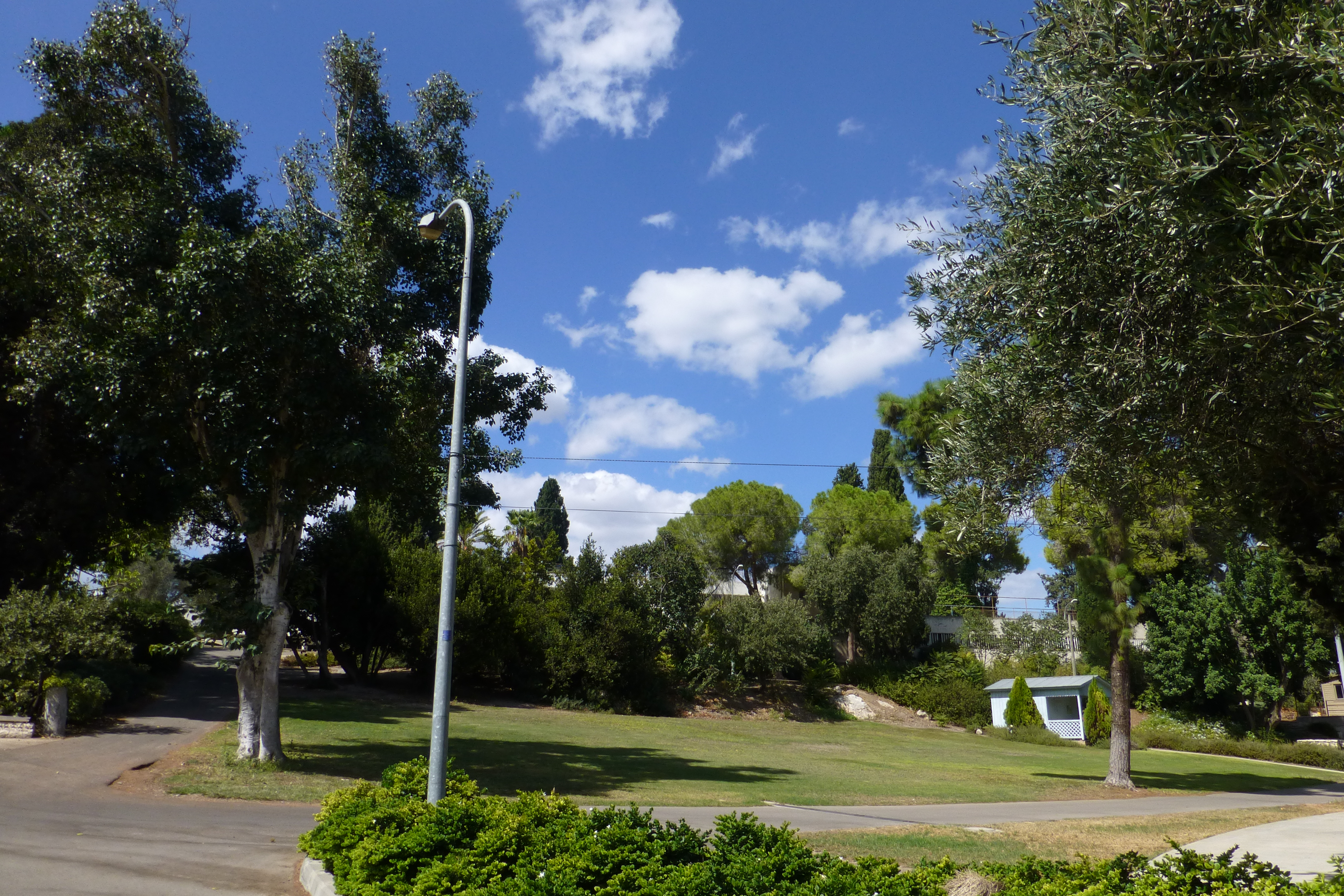
Street in Mishmar HaEmek, 2013

Mishmar HaEmek is located in the southwestern part of the Jezreel Valley, between Highway 66 to its northeast and the foot of the Manasseh Hills to its southwest. Mishmar HaEmek can be reached via Highway 66 off of the section between Megiddo and Yokneam Illit. Next to the kibbutz is the Mishmar HaEmek forest, planted by the Jewish National Fund and members of the kibbutz. It is a section of Megiddo Park (formerly named "Ramot Menashe park"), listed as a biosphere reserve by UNESCO.

Flowing through Mishmar HaEmek is a tributary of the Kishon River, named after the kibbutz. In Arabic, the stream is known as Wadi Abu Shusha, after the Palestinian Arab village that used to exist near the kibbutz. It begins south of the kibbutz, between the hills of the Menashe Heights. Some of the waters also come from the Spring of Shulamit, also known in Arabic as Ayn As-Shaghara Al-Fauqa, meaning "Spring of the High Tree." The stream flows through the kibbutz into the Kishon River in the middle of the Jezreel Valley approximately 4 kilometers north of the kibbutz.

== Economy ==
Mishmar HaEmek is one of the wealthiest kibbutzim in Israel. It is based on a collectivist structure where all assets are communally owned and all residents earn the same amount of money.

Historically, the kibbutz has relied on agriculture as a key source of income. Today, the kibbutz's agricultural holdings include field crops, orchards, dairy cattle and poultry.

The Tama factory, one of the main plastics factories of the kibbutzim movement, has replaced agriculture as the center of the kibbutz economy. In 2015 it was estimated that the company had an annual sales revenue of 1.5 billion NIS which rose to over 2 billion NIS by 2019 (shared with kibbutz Gal'ed). The factory has about 250 workers, a quarter of which are kibbutz members. It manufactures plastic netting used for bundling crops.

Tama is one of the biggest companies making this product and works with companies such as John Deere. It has factories in three countries with a total number of 1600 employees. In the factory the employees and executives who are residents of the kibbutz all earn the same, while non-kibbutz residents who are employed in the factory earn according to their work.

Various services have developed in the kibbutz; some of them are operated privately by the kibbutz members, such as the "IDEA Information System", which provides software for 70% of the museums in Israel, including Yad Vashem. In 2019 the kibbutz finalized a deal with the kibbutzim of Evron and Sa'ar to buy a quarter of their share of a company called Bermad, estimated to be worth around 450 million NIS. The company manufactures water control products that are provided to over 70 other companies, with annual revenue of half a billion NIS, employing around 700 workers.

== Demographics ==
Year	Population
1931	122
1945	390
1948	549
1961	704
1972	923
1983	822
1995	878
2008	956
2024	1,245

According to the 2008 census, 22% of the residents were under 17 years of age, 64% between 18 and 64, and 14% were over 65. The median age was 30. The number of residents born abroad decreased from 32.8% in 1972 to 20.9%. Out of these, 41.5% immigrated until 1960, 21.3% immigrated between 1961 and 1989, 24.7% between 1990 and 2001, and the remaining 12.5% after 2002. The average number of children born per woman decreased from 2.5 in 1972 to 1.7.

41.4% of the residents older than 15 worked in manufacturing, 16.4% in education, 11.6% in agriculture, 7.9% in community, social, personal and other services, and 5.4% in real estate, renting and business activities. 9.8% of the residents older than 15 worked outside of the locality.

Mishmar HaEmek has a secular Jewish community.

== Education ==
Early childhood education is provided at Mishmar HaEmek. The children of the kibbutz study in an elementary school in HaZore'a and then continue to Megiddo Secondary School near Ein HaShofet. Until the 1990s, students in grades 7-12 attended Shomeria secondary school. The complex of the Shomeria School continued to serve the kibbutz for informal education, and following a renovation it now houses offices and a library.

== Landmarks ==
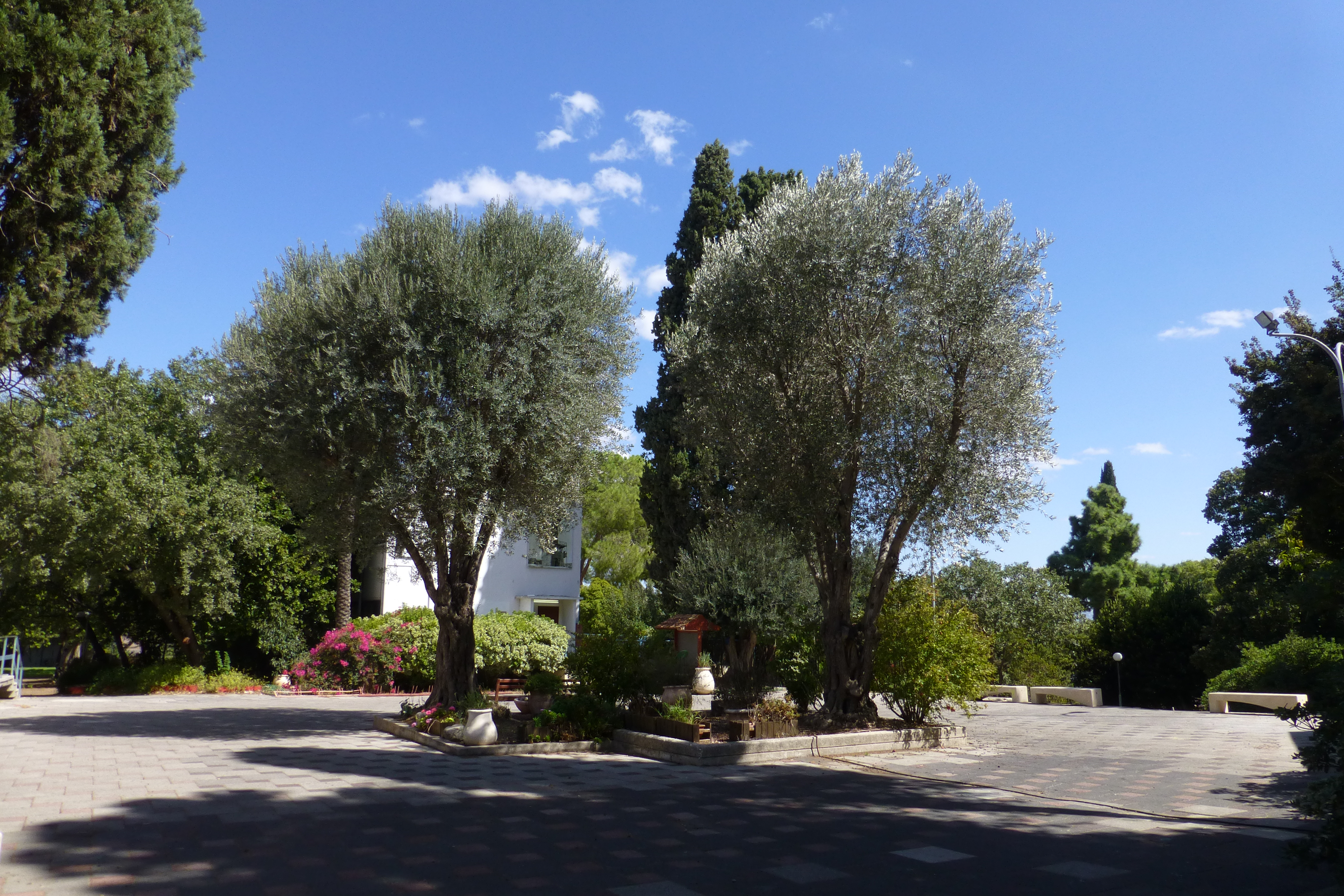
Trees in Mishmar HaEmek

The Palmach Cave is located on the outskirts of the kibbutz, near the forest. It was used by the Palmach unit of the Jewish militia during the Intercommunal conflict in Mandatory Palestine. The cave was chosen by the Palmach upon its establishment in 1941, as a training site for the Palmach's special undercover units. The cave was also used for meetings between the commanders of the Palmach.

Before being used by the Palmach, it was used as a playground by the kibbutz children, and before that, as a shelter for Bedouin nomads during their voyages. Today it is a tourist attraction and educational site run by a member of the kibbutz.

Mishmar HaEmek's cemetery is located on the outskirts of the kibbutz, next to the Palmach Cave. Members of the kibbutz from its past are buried in the cemetery, including five members of the Knesset, many known personalities from the fields of culture and society and a few high-ranked military officers. Some of the people buried in the cemetery are not from the kibbutz but have some connection to it.

Pinat HaGola ("Diaspora's Place") is a memorial site for the children murdered in the Holocaust. The monument was built by the sculptor Zeev Ben-Zvi between 1945 and 1947. He built it with the students of the kibbutz and it was the earliest memorial site for the Holocaust in Israel. During the battle of Mishmar HaEmek in 1948, the site was damaged by a shell, but Zeev Ben-Zvi refused to repair it.

== Archaeology ==
The main site next to Mishmar HaEmek is Tel Shush, which is just north of the kibbutz's buildings. It is a tell with an area of 40 dunams (10 acres) situated on one of the Menashe Heights hills. The mound rises to a height of 50 meters above the valley below it. The site was surveyed in 1949 and 1975. Among the discoveries are the remains of an earth ramp around the mound dated to the Middle Bronze Age, and underground stores attributed to the Crusader period. Many coins bearing the name "Geva‘" were collected on and around the mound.

The site contained potsherds of every historical period between the Middle Bronze Age and modern times. The mound was identified by Israeli geographers and archaeologists as Geva‘ Parashim from the time of the Hasmonean dynasty, Gaba Philippi from the rule of the Roman Empire, or Geva, which appears in the list of cities conquered by 15th century BCE Egyptian king Thutmose III.

Artifacts from Tel Shush are displayed in a permanent, free-access exhibition prepared by members of the kibbutz and with aid from the Israel Antiquities Authority. From the window of the building, Tel Shush can be seen. The collection was created by Ya'akov Padan, a member of the kibbutz. The artifacts were collected by members of the kibbutz throughout the years.

In Mishmar HaEmek there is an archeological site in the location of a depopulated Palestinian village called Al-Ghubayya al-Tahta. The site covers about 40 dunams and contains a tell which cannot be seen from the surface. Seven strata were excavated, which date between the early Neolithic period and the late Ottoman period. A trial excavation took place in February 2007 followed by an excavation in August–September 2007 and another two in July–September 2010. After the excavations a new residential extension was built on top of the site.

The earliest remains are from the Pre-Pottery Neolithic B period. Many flint tools such as sickle blades, arrowheads and knives have been found. An enclosure, paved by stones was found as well as at least eight burial sites: seven for adult males, one for an adult female. Some of the burials feature funerary offerings such as arrowheads, a leg of a wild bull and a pierced shell (probably a pendant). A sample of the animal bones reveals none of them were domesticated and almost half of the bones belonged to wild bulls.

The remains of a large structure and pottery of the Yarmukian and Lodian cultures, dating to the Pottery Neolithic were uncovered. Remains of a Yarmukian culture included flint sickle blades, saws and arrowheads as well as a likely tomb with human bones, some inside a jar. Three rectangular-shaped stone rows were found and their use is unclear. Pottery belonging to the Wadi Rabah culture were found and dated the site to the Early Chalcolithic period.

A tomb and several round or elliptical buildings from the Bronze Age period with an abundance of pottery were found, some with a resemblance to structures found near the city of Kiryat Ata. Pottery from the beginning of the Early Bronze Age and floors of poor dwellings from the Middle Bronze Age period were also found. A structure from the Roman period was also found. Some pottery dated to the early Byzantine period (3rd to 4th century CE) were found, which were probably used to fertilize the land and do not indicate any serious permanent settlement in that period.

In the highest layer, a courtyard surrounded by several rooms, believed to be part of a large building was discovered. It is likely it was built in the 19th century and roof tiles found in it originated from the port of Marseille in France. According to a resident of the kibbutz, the building was not standing when the kibbutz was established.

== Notable people ==
Members of the Knesset

- Mordechai Bentov (1900–1985), the brother of Shulamit Bat-Dori, government minister and signatory of the Israeli declaration of independence. Member of the Mapam political party
- Ya'akov Hazan (1899–1992), member of Knesset. (Mapam, Alignment)
- Amnon Linn (1924–2016), member of Knesset. (Mapai, Alignment, Likud). Born in 1924 to members of the kibbutz. Left the kibbutz to Haifa in 1950
- Emri Ron (1936–2013), member of Knesset (Alignment). Born in the kibbutz in 1936 and stayed there until his death in 2013
- Emma Talmi (1905–2004), member of Knesset (Mapam). Originally from Ein HaHoresh, she joined Kibbutz Dalet in 1927, which later united with Mishmar HaEmek. Died in 2004 and buried in the kibbutz
- Moshe Shamir (1921–2004), author, playwright and a member of the knesset (Mapam). He was a member of the kibbutz between 1944 and 1946

Others

- Eli Amir (born 1937), author. Moved to the kibbutz in 1950 from Iraq and lived there until he moved to Jerusalem in 1953. His novel Tarnegol Kaparot was inspired by his time in the kibbutz. It is considered one of the twenty books that are the foundations modern Hebrew literature
- Shulamit Bat-Dori (1904–1985), producer and director of kibbutz theatre in Israel. Joined the pioneers of the kibbutz in 1923, when they stayed in Nahalal. In 1925 she was sent to Poland by the HaShomer HaTzair movement. She returned to the kibbutz in 1935, where she established the theater of the Kibbutz Artzi movement. She died in 1985 and is buried in the kibbutz
- Or Goren (born 1956), basketball player
- Ayin Hillel (1926–1990), poet and writer. Born in the kibbutz in 1926. Served as a scout during the Battle of Mishmar HaEmek, and later served in the Palmach and fought in the south of the country with the Negev Brigade. Left the kibbutz in 1954 to Jerusalem Died in 1990 and is buried in the kibbutz.
- Yehezkel Braun (1922–2014), composer. Moved to the kibbutz in 1941 and participated in the defense of the kibbutz in 1948. Left in 1952 to study music and became a professor
- Adin Talbar (1921–2013), athlete and sports official
- Zellig Harris (1909–1992), linguist, mathematical syntactician, and methodologist of science
- Bruria Kaufman (1918–2010), theoretical physicist. Wife of Zelling Harris
- Svein Sevje (born 1948), Norwegian ambassador to Israel. Volunteered in the kibbutz after the Six-Day War during the late 60s and learned Hebrew in the kibbutz
- Shneior Lifson (1914–2001), chemical physicist
- Irma Lindheim (1886–1978), Zionist fund-raiser and educator, and 3rd president of Hadassah. Moved to the kibbutz in 1933 from the United States and was a member until her death in 1978. She is buried in the kibbutz's cemetery

== Bibliography ==
- Yoav Gelber, Independence Versus Nakba; Kinneret–Zmora-Bitan–Dvir Publishing, 2004, ISBN 965-517-190-6
