= Irma Lindheim =

American Zionist fundraiser and educator

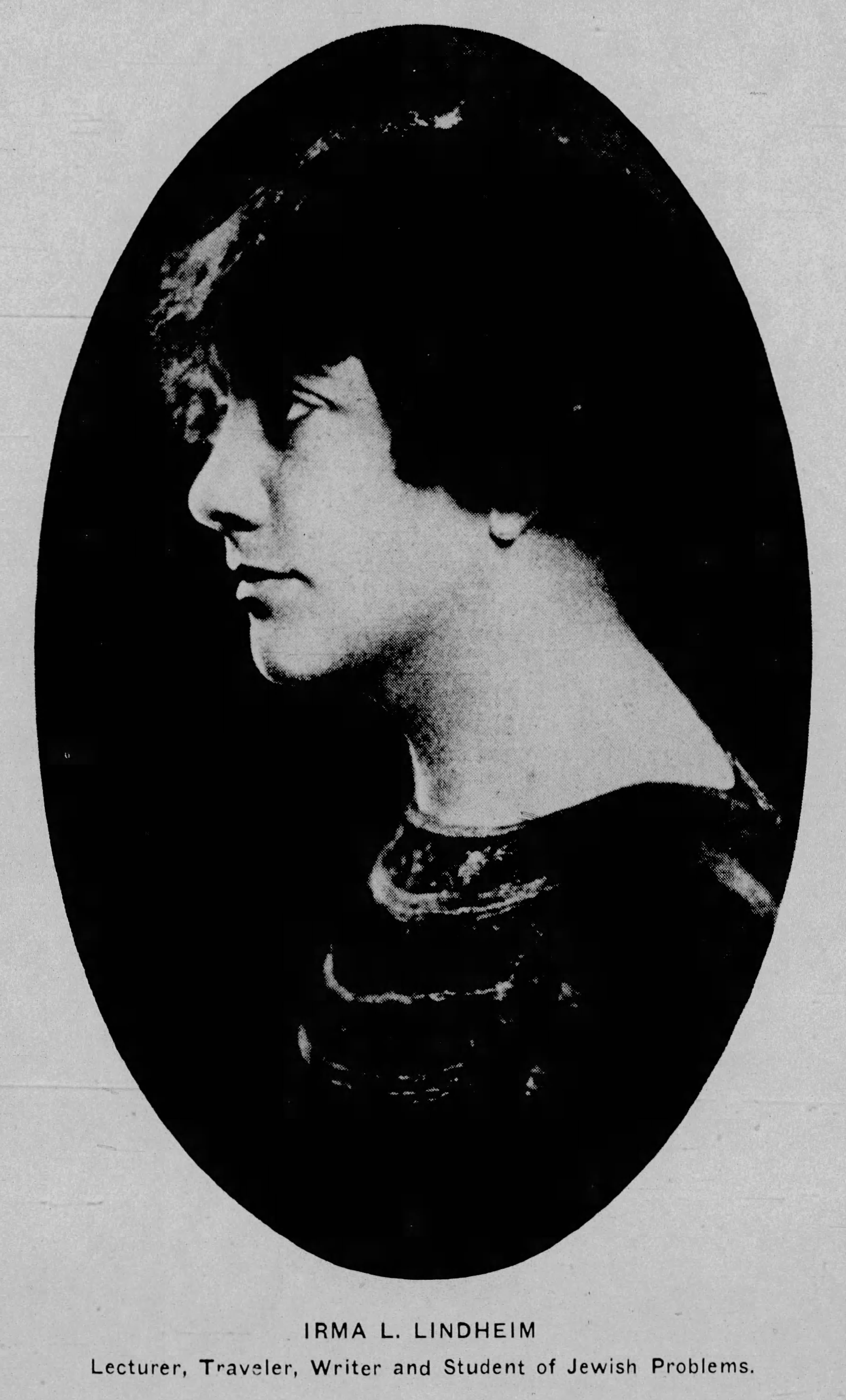
Lindheim c. 1926

Irma L. Lindheim (December 9, 1886 – April 10, 1978), born in New York, was a Zionist fund-raiser and educator.

== Early life ==
Lindheim was born Irma Levy in New York City on December 9, 1886, to a German-Jewish family with roots in the American South. Her father, Robert Levy, was a business man, and her mother, Mathilda (née Morgenstern) stayed at home and raised Irma and her sisters, Amy and Edna. Though Lindheim would later attend a Jewish seminary, her early life at home was largely devoid of Jewish ritual; the family had Christmas trees in their home and declined to celebrate Jewish holidays.

Irma, refusing to consent to her father's insistence that he choose her husband, married Norvin R. Lindheim in 1907, a young attorney and graduate of Johns Hopkins and Columbia University Law School. Together, they had five children, and when Irma's father died in 1914, she inherited a small fortune.

== Initial Zionist activity ==
She served as the only Jewish female first lieutenant in the Motor Corps of America during World War I, starting in 1917. Around this time, Lindheim, inspired by an Ethical Culture teacher, decided to further educate herself on her Judaism. After visiting her husband's cousin in Baltimore, where she met American Zionists and Palestinian Jews, she decided to dedicate herself to Zionism. She began to lecture on the subject, and, recognizing her leadership potential, Henrietta Szold, head of the cultural division of the Zionist Organization of America, named Lindehim to the chair of New York's Seventh Zionist District. There, she oversaw the creation of a cultural center, the opening of which was attended by prominent Zionist and United States Supreme Court Justice Louis Brandeis. Though the center was initially successful, a dispute between Brandeis and Chaim Weizmann at the 1921 Zionist Convention led to the closing of the center.

=== Rabbinical education ===
In 1922 she entered the Jewish Institute of Religion in New York City, but was relegated to special student status. In 1923, she petitioned the faculty to change her status from that of special student to a regular student in the rabbinic program; in response, in May of that year they unanimously recommended the admission of women to the institute on the same basis as men. However, in 1925, she decided to drop her studies and traveled to Palestine.

=== First visit to Palestine ===
During her visit (later described in her book, The Immortal Adventure, published in 1928), Lindehim was able to attend the opening ceremony of Hebrew University and was introduced to Manya Shohat, who would later become a lifelong friend. Shochat helped Lindheim tour the country, taking her to the kibbutz she called home, K'far Giladi. After touring the Negev, Lindheim was newly energized for the Zionist cause.

== Hadassah presidency ==
After a short period of fundraising, Lindheim became the third president of Hadassah, in 1926. At the time, the Zionist Organization of America, then-president Louis Lipsky was pressuring Hadassah to give up their autonomy and fold into the ZOA. Lindheim fought against that pressure and eventually succeeded, was re-elected president in 1927, and served as Hadassah's delegate to the World Zionist Congress in Basel. When she returned, she joined the Labor Zionist Poale Zion, prompting the Hadassah board to demand her resignation on the grounds of conflict of interest. Lindheim resigned her post and began to raise funds for Histadrut and Hashomer Hatzair, organizations that defined themselves as further left than Hadassah.

== Back to Palestine ==
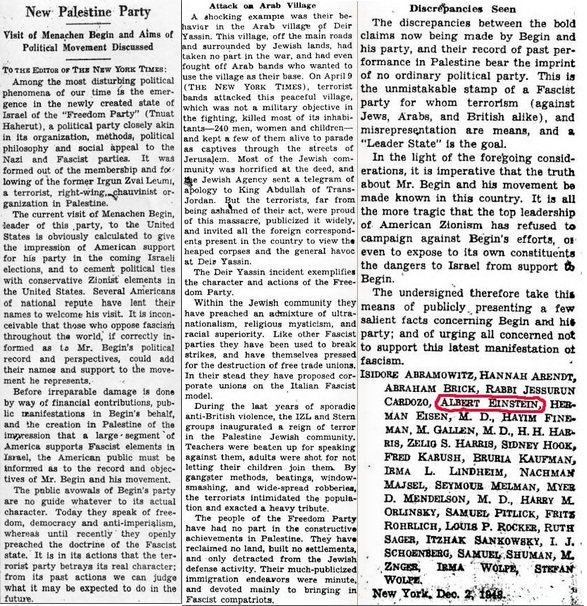
A letter to The New York Times from Lindheim, Albert Einstein, and others, December 4, 1948

In March 1933, Lindheim moved to Palestine with her children (Norvin had died in 1928) and attempted to found a Histadrut-funded clearing house for new immigrants. Finding this unfulfilling, she moved to Kibbutz Mishmar HaEmek. At 47, she was about 25 years older than the average kibbutz member.

During World War II, she was drafted by Keren Kayemet to solicit funding for Zionist causes in England. She also remained active in prodding Hadassah during this time, petitioning them to increase their work with the Zionist youth movement. Briefly moving back to America, she mounted an unsuccessful congressional campaign as candidate for the American Labor Party in Queens, New York, in 1948 (when she appeared at rallies for Progressive presidential candidate Henry A. Wallace and ran with Brooklyn ALP candidate Lee Pressman), sending her back to what was now Israel.

There, she helped to create Kibbutz Adamit and Kibbutz Ein HaShofet. Shofet, which means "judge" in Hebrew, was chosen to honor Louis Brandeis. Dubbed the "grandmother of the kibbutz" by the Israeli press, she moved back to the U.S. in the mid-60's, continuing to write articles and essays for Zionist publications.

In 1962 she published her autobiography Parallel Quest: A Search of a Person and a People.

Lindheim died on April 10, 1978, in Berkeley, California.

== Some published works ==
Lindheim, Irma (1928) The Immortal Adventure. The Macauley Company

Lindheim, Irma (1962) Parallel Quest: A Search of a Person and People. New York.
