= Paula Fürst =

Paula Fürst (August 6, 1894 – probably June 1942) was a German reform educator of Jewish descent.

== Education and early development ==
Paula Fürst was born in Głogów to Otto Fürst, a Jewish merchant and Malvine Fürst, née Rosenberg. Following the untimely and early death of her father, Paula moved to Berlin together with her mother and her older sister. During her studies in French and History she became acquainted with the principles of Montessori education and was deeply impressed with this "new way of education". She obtained a Montessori diploma through studies in Berlin and Rome and became head of the first Montessori class in Berlin. In addition, she was a frequent lecturer on pedagogical topics.

== Life and work under the Nazi regime ==
According to Nazi ideology, the Montessori method was mainly propagated by "Jewish elements" and contributed to selfish and anti-national behavior. Consequently, Paula Fürst was forced to resign from her position as teacher in 1933. In the same year, she became head teacher of the Theodor Herzl School of Berlin, a Zionist school with 600 students. As the Nazis tightened the grip on Jewish life in Berlin and Germany, conditions at the Herzl School deteriorated rapidly. Following the Kristallnacht of November 1938, Leo Baeck offered Paula Fürst the position of head of all Jewish schools in Germany which she accepted. She also accompanied many children of the Kindertransport to London but refused to stay abroad although life for Jews in Germany had become unbearable and the beginning of World War II was imminent.

== Deportation and death ==
Paula Fürst was arrested on June 19, 1942 and deported to Minsk on June 24, 1942 together with 201 people. Historians theorize that she died in a death camp, possibly Auschwitz, later that year.
