= Jan Edmund Nyheim =

Norwegian diplomat (born 1933)

Jan Edmund Nyheim (born 6 October 1933) is a Norwegian diplomat.

He was born in Fræna Municipality, and is a cand.jur. by education. He started working for the Norwegian Ministry of Foreign Affairs in 1961. He was a special adviser in polar affairs from 1983, and deputy under-secretary of state in the polar department in 1984. He then served as the Norwegian ambassador to Canada from 1987 to 1993, to Italy from 1993 to 1996 and to Spain from 1996 to 2000.

Diplomatic posts
Preceded by Helge Vindenes	Norwegian ambassador to Spain; 1996–2000	Succeeded by Kjell-Martin Fredriksen
