= Ketil Lindseth =

Norwegian politician

Kari Henriksen (born 1977) is a Norwegian politician for the Labour Party.

He started his political career in the Workers' Youth League in Nord-Trøndelag, and chaired the local chapter there from 1997 to 1999. He studied sociology from 1997 to 1998 at the Nord-Trøndelag University College, and media studies from 1999 to 2000 at the Norwegian University of Science and Technology. From 1999 to 2004 he was a member of Nord-Trøndelag county council.

From 2000 to 2002 he worked as a secretary for the Labour Party parliamentary group. From 2002 to 2007 he worked as a communications advisor. In 2007 he was hired as a political advisor in the Ministry of Labour and Social Inclusion as a part of the second cabinet Stoltenberg. He changed ministry to the Ministry of Health and Care Services in 2008, and was promoted to State Secretary in 2009.
