= Tel Shush =

Archaeological site in Israel

Tel Shush (Hebrew: תל שוש) or Tell Abu Shusha (Arabic: تل أبو شوشة) is a tell located next to Kibbutz Mishmar HaEmek on the eastern slopes of the Menashe Heights, overlooking the Jezreel Valley. The tell's area is about 40 dunams and it rises to a height of 50 meters from its foot. The site was identified with Geva, mentioned in the list of cities conquered by Thutmose III; Geva‘ of the Horsemen (Geva' Parashim in Hebrew), mentioned by Josephus in The Jewish War 3.3.1); and Gaba Philippi from Roman times. The site contains remains of human settlement from the Bronze Age, Iron Age, Persian, Hellenistic, Roman, Byzantine, Early Arab, Crusader, Mamluk and Ottoman periods.

In recent years, the site is being excavated by the Jezreel Valley Regional Project.

== Roman and Byzantine periods ==
=== Roman tomb ===
A burial cave was discovered in 1980, one kilometer southwest of Tel Shush. The cave was carved into the right bank of Nahal Mishmar (Mishmar River). It has one chamber, with six burial niches or loculi and a courtyard in front of it. The finds within the cave are securely dated to the first century CE. Although the tomb was disturbed and the finds were scattered, none of the remains are dated to a later period, which means the tomb was in use only during that period. The ceramic finds include a red slipware bowl, a fine-ware cup and a skyphos with barbotine decoration. Three similar bowls were found next to Tel Shush. Other finds include a bowl, a juglet, "Herodian" lamps and fragments of a figurine of a horse with a rider. The most important discovery is a real-life sized terracotta mask of a helmeted warrior. These finds contribute to the identification of Tel Shush with Geva Parashim.

=== Oil press and lead weights bearing the name "Gabe" ===
An illustration of a lead weight (62x55mm, 212.2 gram) found at Tel Shush, with Greek inscription of the city "Gabe", identified as Geva' Parashim.

Two caves were discovered in March 1981 at the foot of the tell during road construction. Within a large cave, olive oil installations were found. On the cave's wall are pits which were carved and plastered, which were used for storage. This cave is dated based on the ceramic assemblage to the first and second centuries CE. In the other, smaller cave, similar pits were found. Inside the cave, two lead weights were found one on top of each other. One of the weights is decorated with geometrical signs, its size is 52x52 mm, and it weighs about 72 grams. The other lead weight is slightly larger (62x55mm) and features a Greek inscription with the name of the city Gabe (Greek: ΓABE), the 218th year to its establishment and its weight, half of a libra. This discovery further contributes to the identification of Tel Shush with Geva Parashim ("Geba of the Horsemen"), mentioned by Josephus in The Jewish War 3.3.1), while others suggest that it may have been brought there from another place. The cave in which the weights were found is dated to the first to six centuries CE.

=== Aqueduct ===
A 1.2 meter high Roman aqueduct was discovered during the expansion of the Mishmar HaEmek–Ein HaShofet road next to Tel Shush. Another similar aqueduct was found in the summer of 1981.

== See also ==
- Jaba', Haifa
- Tel Yokneam
- Tel Qashish
- Tel Qiri
- Tel Megiddo
