= Tel Megadim =

Tel Megadim (Tel Sahar) is an archaeological site located on the Carmel coast of Israel, about 2 km north of Atlit and 11 km south of Tel Shiqmona (Haifa). Excavations there have uncovered significant Middle Bronze Age IIA structures and a notable Persian period settlement, featuring a kurkar stone altar, diverse imported ceramic wares, and horse-and-rider figurines.

== History ==
Tel Megadim has no port, but anchors have been found offshore providing evidence that ships anchored there and ferried cargo ashore on smaller craft. These anchored ships would have been protected from rough seas by a natural lagoon created by underwater kurkar ridges.

=== Chalcolithic ===
During the Chalcolithic there are no structures, but the site was occupied with pottery shards, basalt vessel fragments and flint tools found in fill layers in the bedrock.

=== Early Bronze Age ===
In the EB I, ceramic analysis show close cultural relationship between its inhabitants and those from Qiryat 'Ata, Tel Qashish, 'En Assawir, 'En Shadud and Megiddo.

In the EB IV (Intermediate period), there were finds showing the mode of subsistence.

=== Middle Bronze Age ===
==== Middle Bronze IIA ====
In the MB, two dozen tombs with artifacts and skeletal remains show burial practices, social stratification and trade relations.

In late MB IIA, Cypriot pottery have been found at Tel Megadim.

=== Persian ===
During the Persian period, there was significant activity at the site with a complete town plan during the 5th century BCE.

== Excavations ==
Excavations by M. Broshi (1967–1969) and later Samuel Wolff identified several strata of occupation, with a major focus on the Persian Period (5th century BC).

== See also ==
- Archaeology of Israel
- History of Israel
