= Jezreel Valley =

Valley in Israel

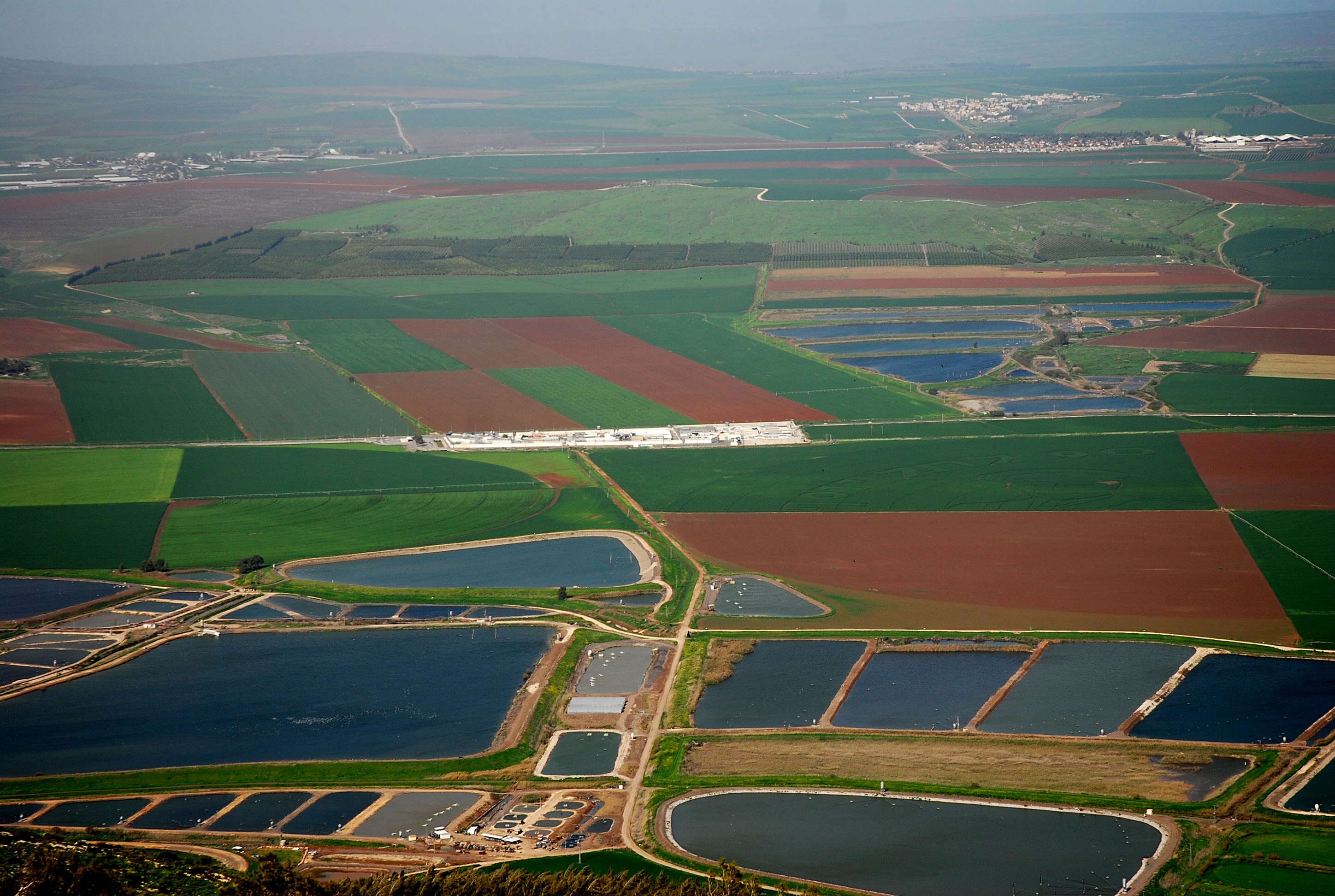
- Agriculture in the Jezreel Valley

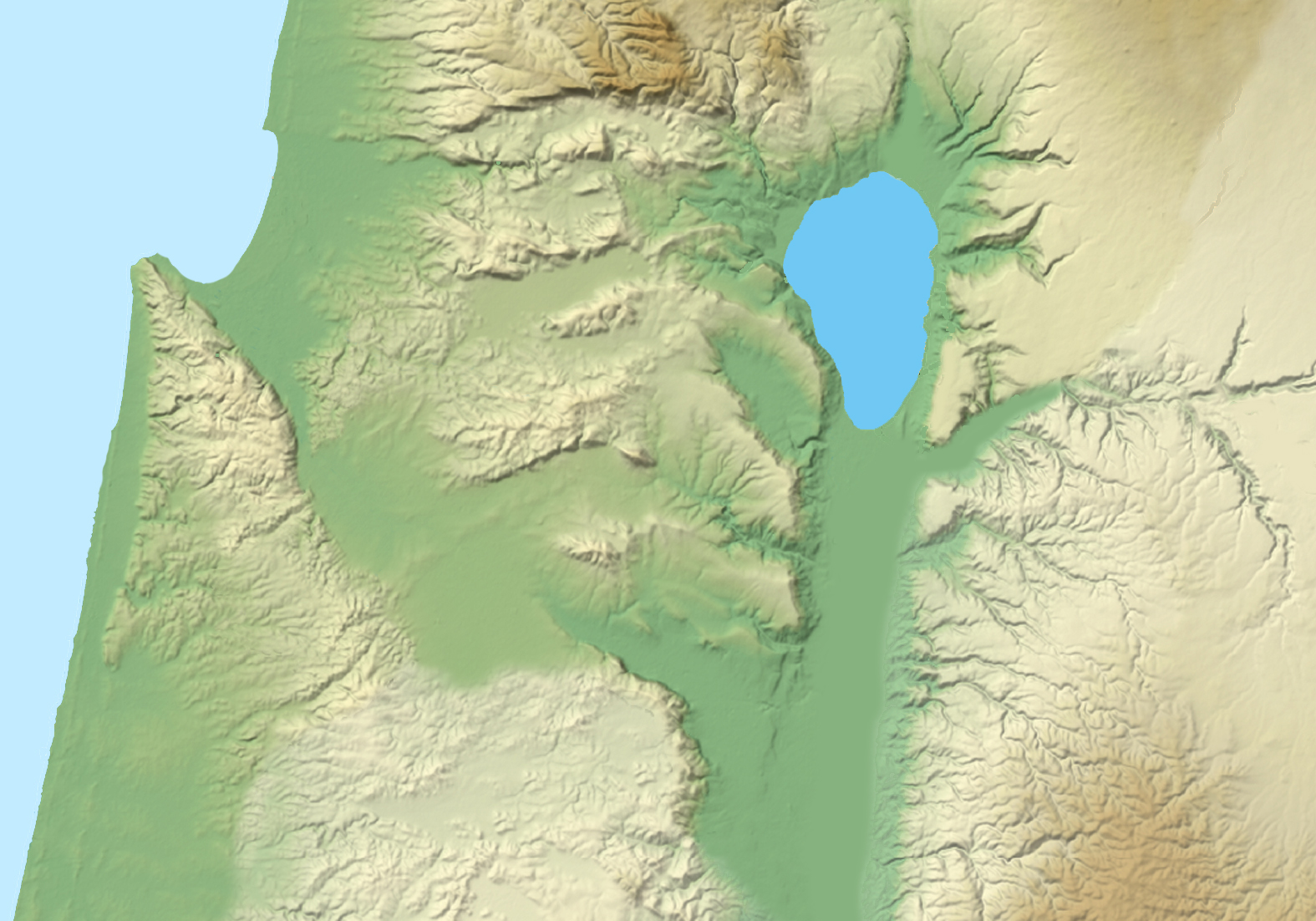

Geography
- Location: Israel
- Coordinates: 32°35′47″N 35°14′31″E

The Jezreel Valley (Biblical Hebrew: עמק יזרעאל, romanized: ʿĒmeq Yizrəʿēl, LXX Koine Ιεζραελ), or Marj Ibn Amir (Arabic: مرج ابن عامر, romanized: Marj ibn ʿĀmir, lit. 'Meadow of Ibn Amir') is a large fertile plain and inland valley in the Northern District of Israel. It is bordered to the north by the highlands of the Lower Galilee, to the south by the highlands of Samaria, to the west and northwest by the Mount Carmel range, and to the east by the Jordan Valley, with Mount Gilboa marking its southern extent. The largest settlement in the valley is the city of Afula, which lies near its center.

== Name ==
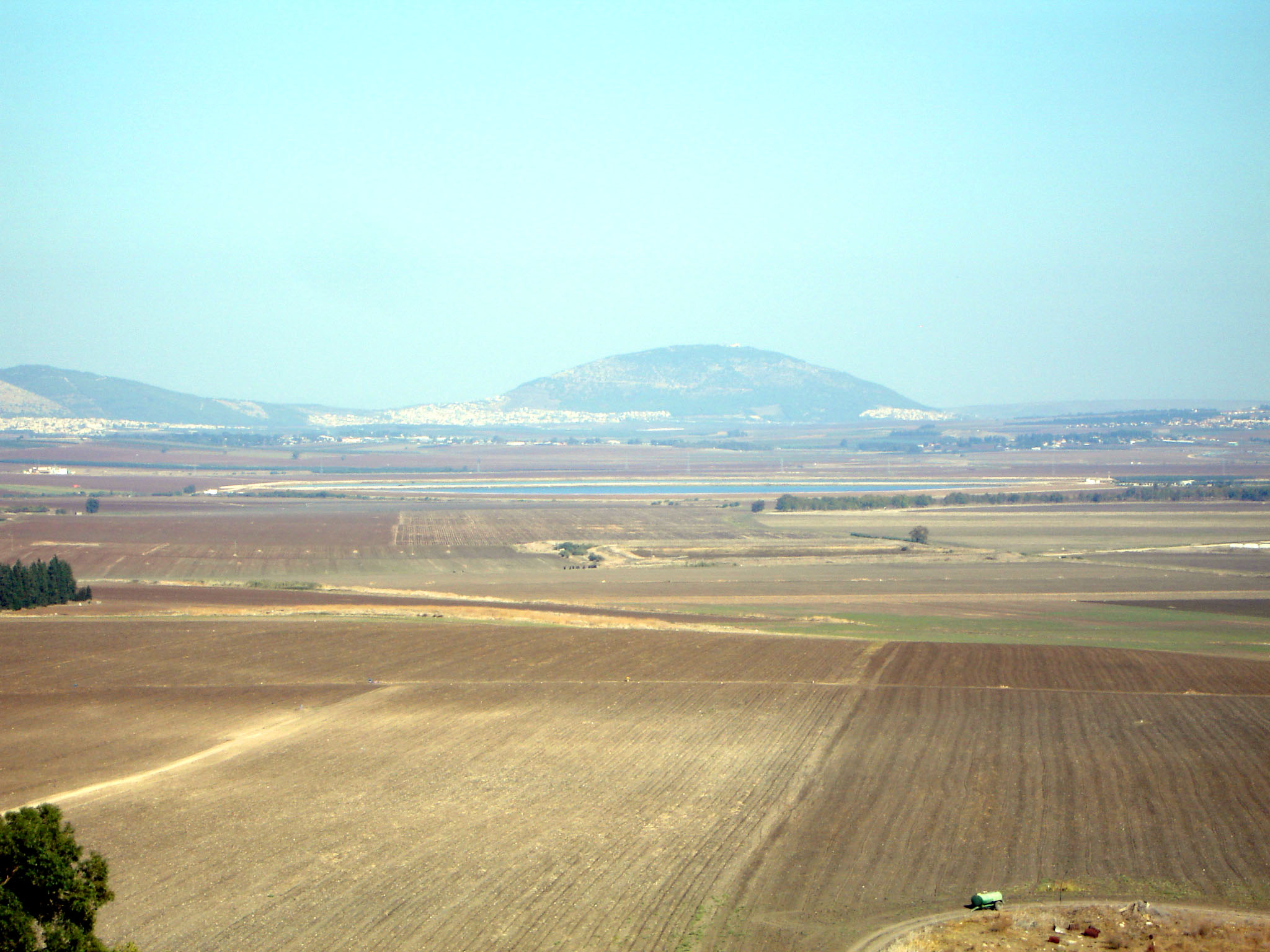
Jezreel Valley and Mount Tabor

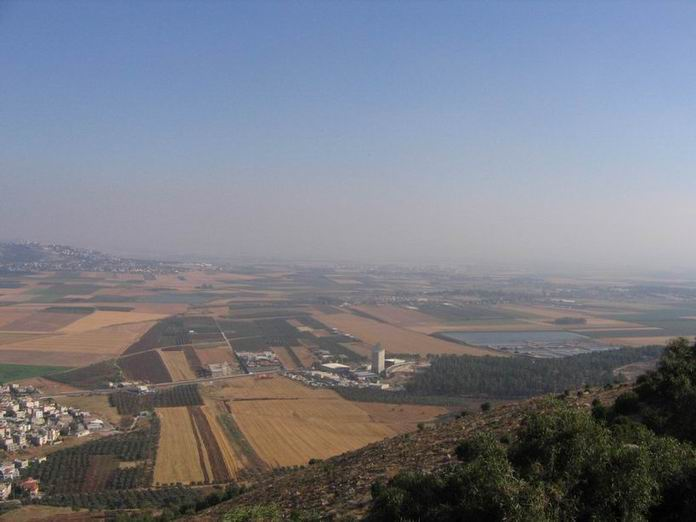
Jezreel Valley

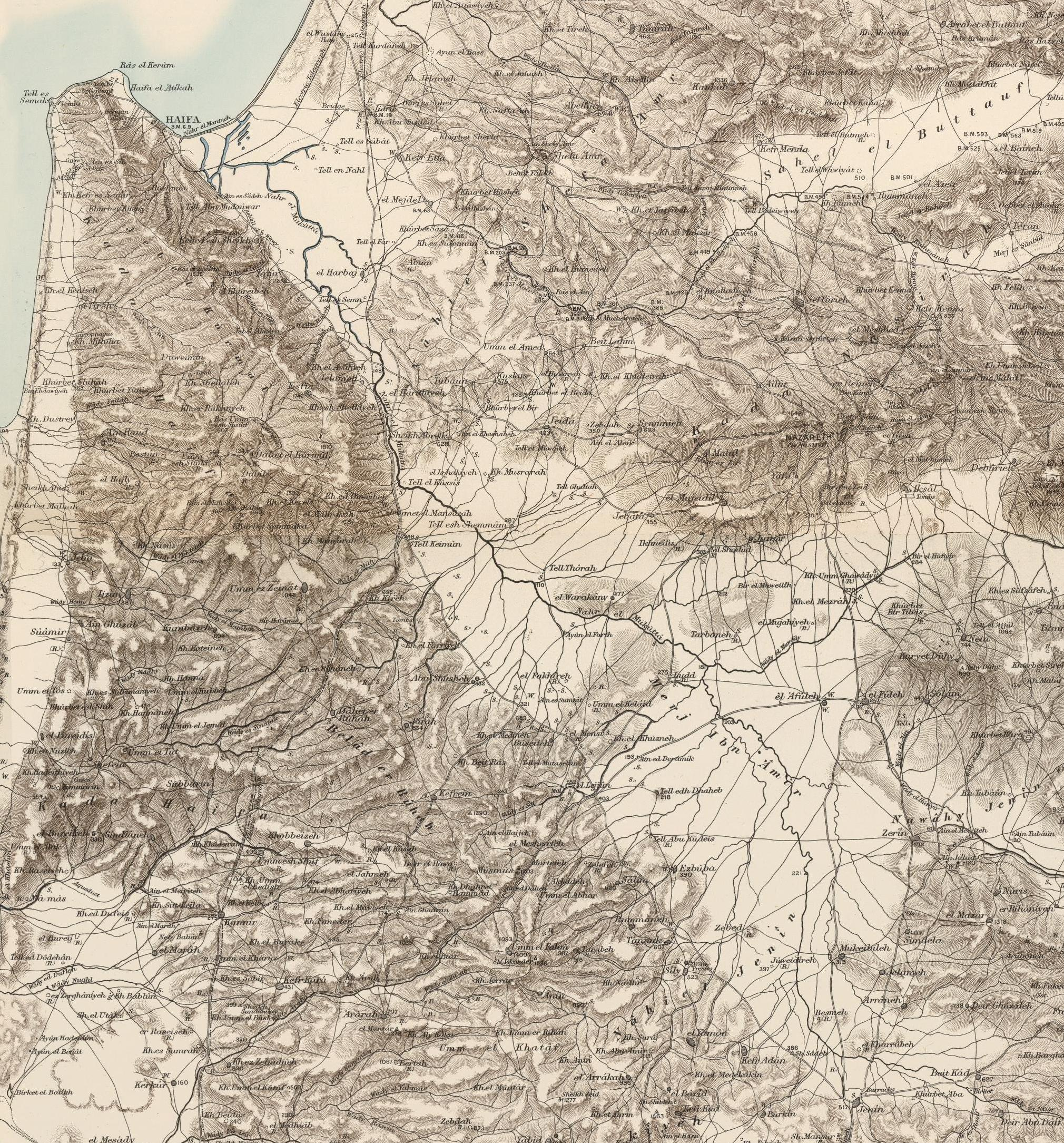
Merj Ibn 'Amir in the PEF Survey of Palestine.

The Jezreel Valley takes its name from the ancient city of Jezreel (known in Hebrew as Yizre'el; יזרעאל; known in Arabic as Zir'ēn, زرعين) which was located on a low hill overlooking the southern edge of the valley. The word Jezreel comes from the Hebrew, and means "God sows" or "El sows".

The Arabic name of the valley is Marj Bani Amir (Arabic: مرج بني عامر, romanized: Marj Banī ʿĀmir), which translates as the 'Meadow of the Banu Amir', an Arab tribe, or its common variant Marj Ibn ʿĀmir (Arabic: مرج ابن عامر), lit. 'Meadow of the son of Amir'. According to historian Amnon Cohen, parts of the Banu Amir took up abode in the valley after the 7th-century Muslim conquest. The historian Yossef Rapoport holds that the Banu Amir tribe did not migrate to the valley, but rather the inhabitants of the valley adopted lineage from the Banu Amir; in Rapoport's view, this was a culmination of a generational process in rural Palestine and Syria in the post-Crusader period whereby locals embraced an Arab identity and sought to bind themselves to the Arab genealogical tree.

The name 'Marj Bani Amir' was not used by the Ayyubid-era (1187–1260) geographer Yaqut al-Hamawi in his 13th-century work. Its earliest recorded use was in the work A'yan al-Asr by the Mamluk historian al-Safadi (d. 1363). Rapoport considers it "the most famous [originally] "Arab" place-name in Palestine". The name was increasingly used in Arabic texts to refer to the region as an administrative unit during the late Mamluk period (1260–1517). In earlier Arabic texts, the region was called after one of its well known sites, the Ayn Jalut spring. Marj Bani Amir became the official administrative name of the district which encompassed the valley from early Ottoman rule (1517–1917). With the advent of British rule in 1917 and the gradual acquisition of the valley by Jewish land organizations, such as in the Sursock purchases, the Arabic name fell out of official use in favor of the biblical 'Jezreel Valley'.

== Geology ==
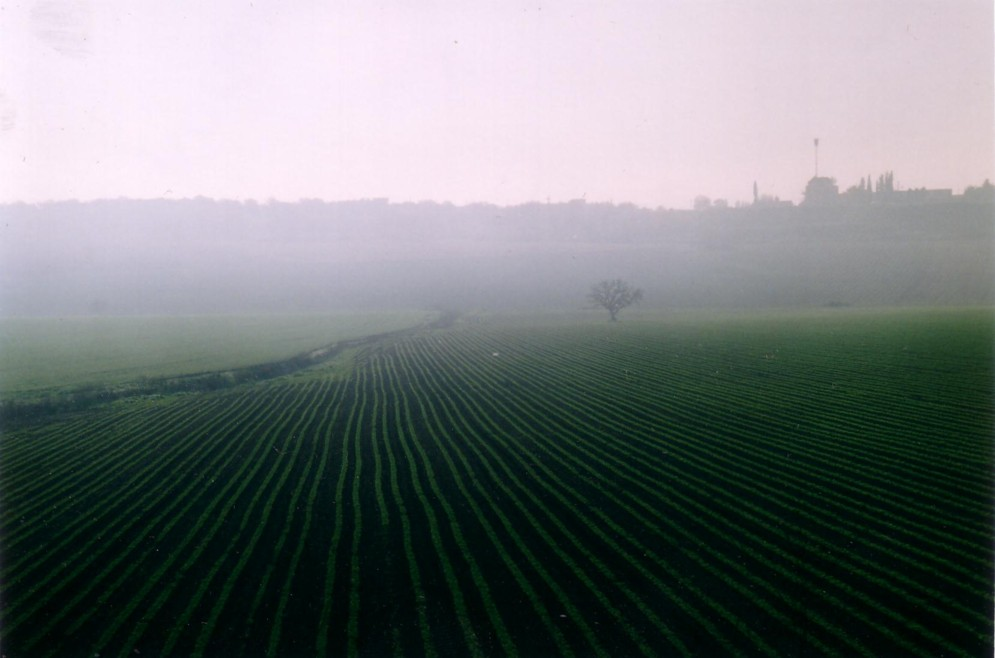
Fog on the Megiddo valley

The valley once acted as the channel by which the Mediterranean Sea, at the north-western end of the valley, connected to the Sea of Galilee, the Jordan Valley and ultimately to the Dead Sea. About two million years ago, as the land between the Mediterranean Sea and the Jordan Rift Valley rose, this connection was lost, and the periodic floods from the Mediterranean Sea ceased. This resulted in the Dead Sea no longer having a connection to the ocean, and over time, due to greater evaporation than precipitation plus surface water inflow, it has become heavily saline. The Sea of Galilee, on the other hand, consists of fresh water.

== Geography ==
The Jezreel Valley is a green fertile plain covered with fields of wheat, watermelon, melon, oranges, white beans, cowpeas, chickpeas, green beans, cotton, sunflowers and corn, as well as grazing tracts for multitudes of sheep and cattle. The area is governed by the Jezreel Valley Regional Council. The Max Stern College of Emek Yizreel and the Emek Medical Center are located in the valley.

== Biblical and theological relevance ==
=== In the Hebrew Bible ===
According to the Hebrew Bible, the valley was the scene of several battles with the Israelites. A victory was led by Deborah and Barak against the Canaanites (Judges 4). Another was led by Gideon against the Midianites, the Amalekites, and "the children of the East" (Judges 6:3). It was later the location at which the Israelites, led by King Saul, were defeated by the Philistines (1 Samuel 29:1–29:6). According to textual scholars, the account of an ancient Philistine victory at Jezreel derives from the monarchial source, in contrast to the republican source, which places the Philistine victory against the Israelites at Mount Gilboa (1 Samuel 28:4,1 Samuel 31:1–31:6). Another defeat was of King Josiah by the Egyptians (2 Kings 23:29).

According to 2 Kings 9:1–9:10, the Jezreel Valley was where Jehu massacred all members of the Omride family.

=== In Christian eschatology ===
In Christian eschatology, the part of the valley on which the Battle of Megiddo was fought is believed to be the destined site of the penultimate battle between good and evil (with a later, final battle taking place 1,000 years later around Jerusalem (Revelation 20:7–20:10)), the place being known as Armageddon, a toponym derived from the Hebrew Har Megiddo, 'Mount Megiddo'.

== History ==
Archaeological excavations have indicated near continuous settlement from the Ghassulian culture of the Chalcolithic Age (c. 4500–3300 BCE) to the Ayyubid periods of the 11–13th centuries CE.

=== Bronze and Iron Ages ===
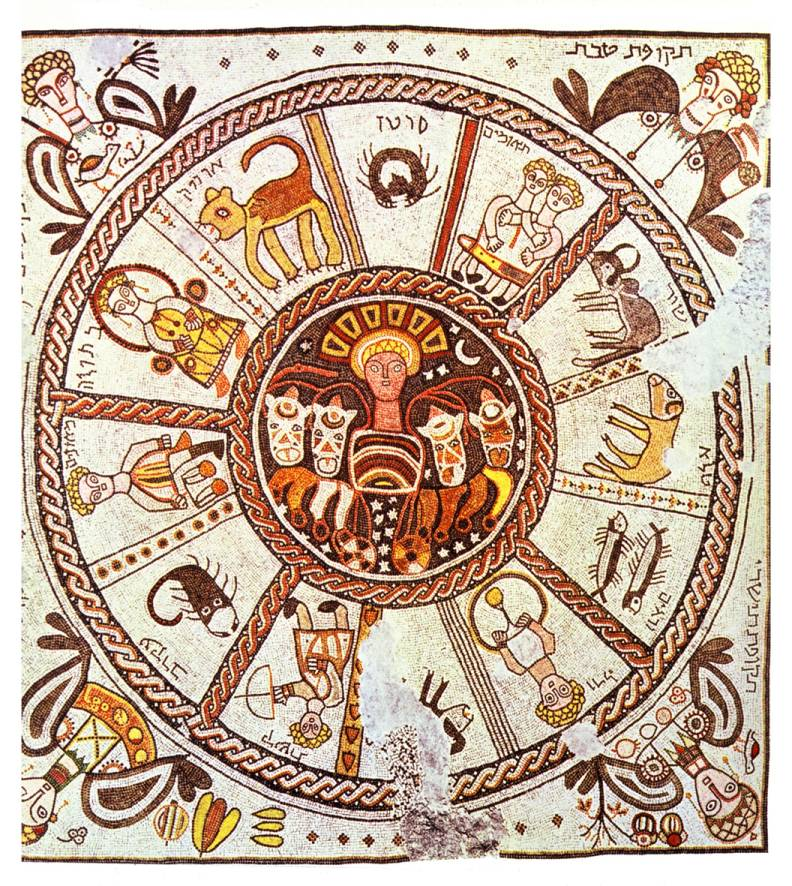
Mosaic pavement of a 6th-century synagogue at Beit Alpha. It was discovered in 1928. Signs of the zodiac surround the central chariot of the Sun (a Greek motif), while the corners depict the 4 "turning points" ("tekufot") of the year, solstices and equinoxes, each named for the month in which it occurs—tequfah of Tishrei, tequfah of Tevet, tequfah of Nisan, tequfah of Tamuz.

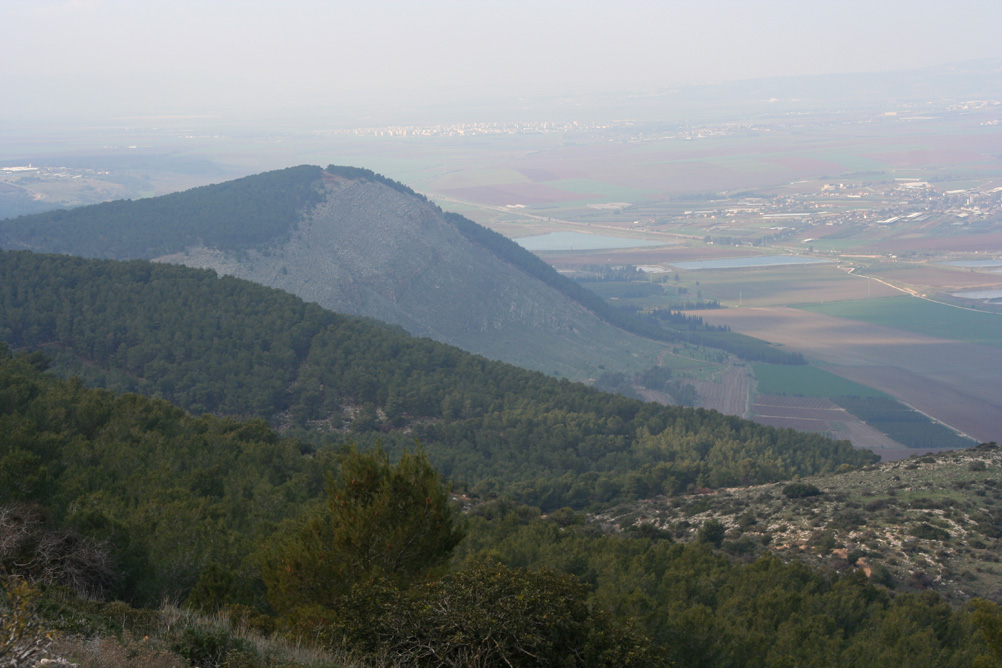
View from Mount Gilboa

Biblical cities in the Jezreel Valley include Jezreel, Megiddo, Beit She'an, Shimron and Afula.

There is a surviving detailed account of the earliest battle for the Jezreel Valley, the 15th-century BC Battle of Megiddo, to prove that it was fought in the valley. Due to the surrounding terrain, Egyptian chariots were only able to travel from Egypt as far as the Jezreel Valley and the valley north of Lake Huleh.

In the western part of the Jezreel Valley, 23 of the 26 Iron Age I sites (12th to 10th centuries BCE) yielded typical Philistine pottery. These sites include Tel Megiddo, Tel Yokneam, Tel Qiri, Afula, Tel Qashish, Be'er Tiveon, Hurvat Hazin, Tel Risim, Tel Re'ala, Hurvat Tzror, Tel Sham, Midrakh Oz and Tel Zariq. Scholars have attributed the presence of Philistine pottery in northern Israel to their role as mercenaries for the Egyptians during their military administration of the land in the 12th century BCE. This presence may also indicate further expansion of the Philistines to the valley during the 11th century BCE, or their trade with the Israelites. There are biblical references to Philistines in the valley during the times of the judges. The quantity of Philistine pottery within these sites is still quite small, which means that even if the Philistines did settle the valley they were a minority that blended within the Canaanite population during the 12th century BC. The Philistines were present in the valley during the 11th century according to the Book of Samuel's biblical account of their victory at the Battle of Gilboa.

=== Roman period ===
In the late Second Temple period, Josephus refers to both the Jezreel Valley and the Beit Netofa Valley as the "Great Plain".

=== Mamluk period ===
During the Mamluk period, the Jezreel Valley formed the southern part of Mamlakat Safad (the province of Safed). In the 14th century, it was inhabited by the Bani Haritha tribe of Yaman (southern Arab)-affiliated Bedouins, the progenitors of the Turabay dynasty.

=== Ottoman period ===
During the early Ottoman period, the Jezreel Valley was the core territory of the Turabay Emirate (1517–1683). The Valley's capital was initially at Lajjun, the center of an eponymous sanjak and one of Palestine's provincial capitals during the 16th century. Around 1600, the seat of the Turabays moved to Jenin. In the early 16th-century Ottoman tax records, the Valley contained 38 villages, as well as 74 uninhabited mazra'a's, a reflection of the Valley's decline during the late Mamluk period. The Turabays were entrusted with securing the region and restoring its prosperity. After the fall of the Turabay Emirate, the Valley became contested space between the rulers of Acre and Nablus until taken over by Daher al-Umar during the 1760s.

In the late Ottoman era, the outskirts of the Jezreel Valley, within both the Nazareth and Shefa-'Amr nahiyas, had sparse populations. Malaria was widespread, particularly in the plains, notably in the vicinity of the Kishon River and its tributaries. This disease drove away many locals, allowing Bedouins to fill the void. In drought years, Bedouins from the ghor even encroached into lands cultivated by the fellahin, covering the area with their tents. The "permanent" nomads, Bedouins of Turkmen descent, resided in the Jezreel Valley during summer and autumn, then wintered between the Sharon region and the Valley, moving through the Manasseh Hills.

In 1858, Josias Leslie Porter summarized the appearance of the valley in the following words: "Two things strike us forcibly when looking over the plain of Esdraelon. First, its wonderful richness, ..., second, its desolation. if we except its eastern branches there is not a single inhabited village on its whole surface, and not more than one-tenth of its soil is cultivated. It is home to the wandering Bedawy... It has always been insecure." Laurence Oliphant, who visited the Akko Sanjak valley area in 1887, then a subprovince of the Beirut vilayet, wrote that the Valley of Esdraelon (Jezreel) was "a huge green lake of waving wheat, with its village-crowned mounds rising from it like islands; and it presents one of the most striking pictures of luxuriant fertility which it is possible to conceive." In the early 1900, the Ottomans constructed the Jezreel Valley railway which ran along the entire length of the valley.

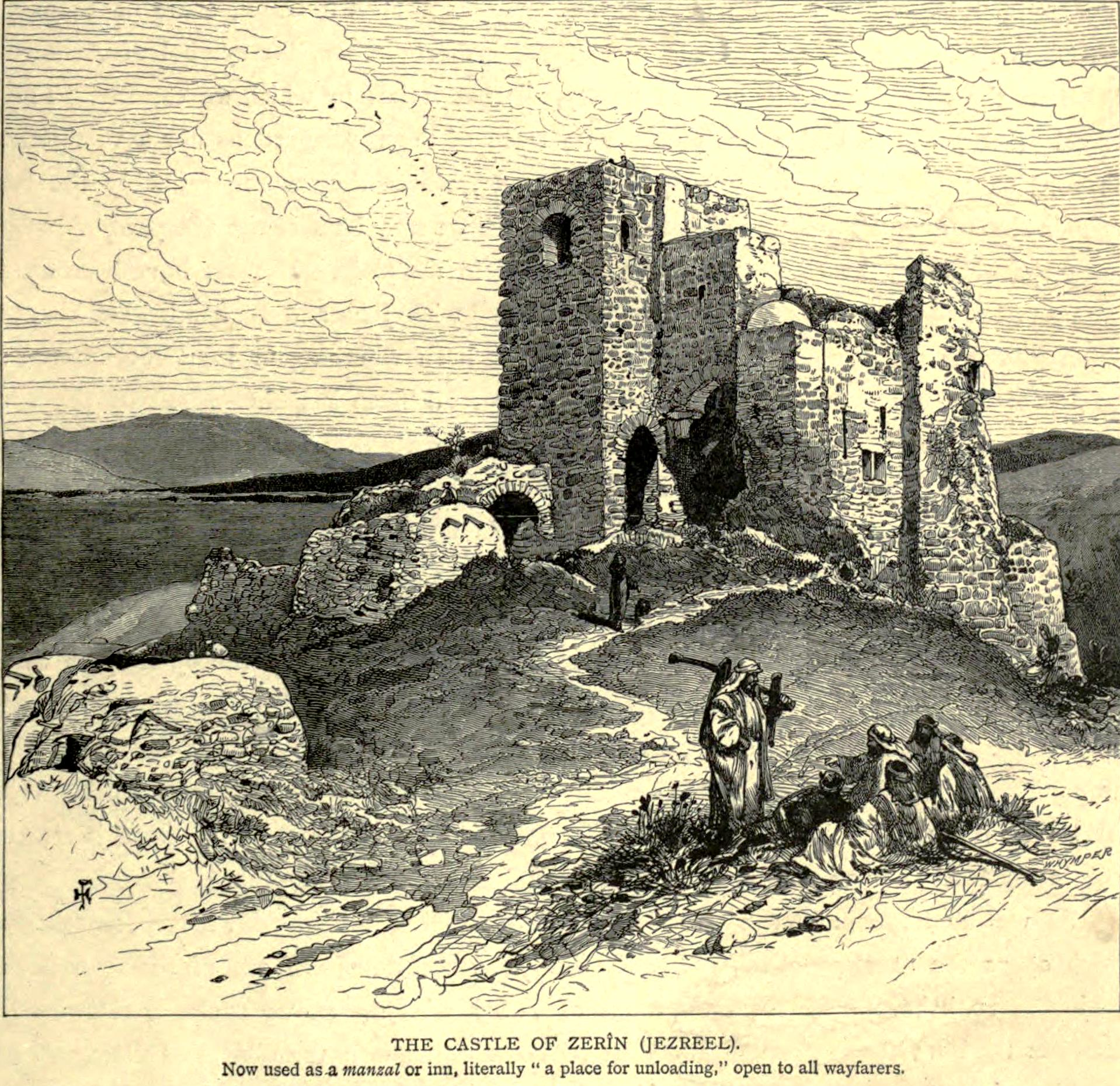
The tower house of the "Castle of Zir'in" in the 1880s

The Ottoman Land Code of 1858 required land owners to register their property and obtain title-deeds. The intent of this law was framed by the government as a way to "restore the prosperity of the agriculturalists", but its primary purposes were to increase tax revenue and to exercise greater state control over the area. However the registration process was poorly implemented and open to manipulation. Land collectively owned by village residents was registered in the name of a single landowner, with merchants and local Ottoman administrators registering large swaths of land in their own name. The result was that land often became the legal property of people who may have never lived there, while the sharecroppers and peasants who had lived and worked on the land for generations, became tenants of absentee owners.

In 1872, the Sursock family of Beirut (present-day Lebanon) purchased land in the Jezeel Vaey from the Ottoman government for approximately £20,000. Purchases such as this did not generally result in the dispossession of the farmers living there, who did not face eviction, and were allowed to continue use of the land they held.

In 1920, the British reopened the land registry, which had been closed since 1918 due to WWI and the subsequent dissolution of the Ottoman Empire. In 1921 the Sursock family (then under the French Mandate of Syria) sold their 80,000 dunams of land, containing around twenty-two villages, in the Jezreel Valley to the American Zion Commonwealth for $726,000, marking the first major post-war sale of land. The land was purchased by the Jewish organization as part of an effort to resettle Jews who inhabited the land, as well as others who came from distant lands.

=== British Mandate ===
After the land was sold to the American Zion Commonwealth, some of the Arab farmers who lived in nearby villages and had been working for the absentee landowners were given financial compensation or were provided with land elsewhere. Despite the sale, some of the farmers refused to leave their land, as in Afula (El-Ful), however the new owners decided that it would be inappropriate for these farmers to remain as tenants on land intended for Jewish labor. This was a commonplace feeling among segments of the Jewish population, part of a socialist ideology of the Yishuv, which included their working the land rather than being absentee landowners. British police had to be used to expel some and the dispossessed made their way to the coast to search for new work with most ending up in shanty towns on the edges of Jaffa and Haifa.

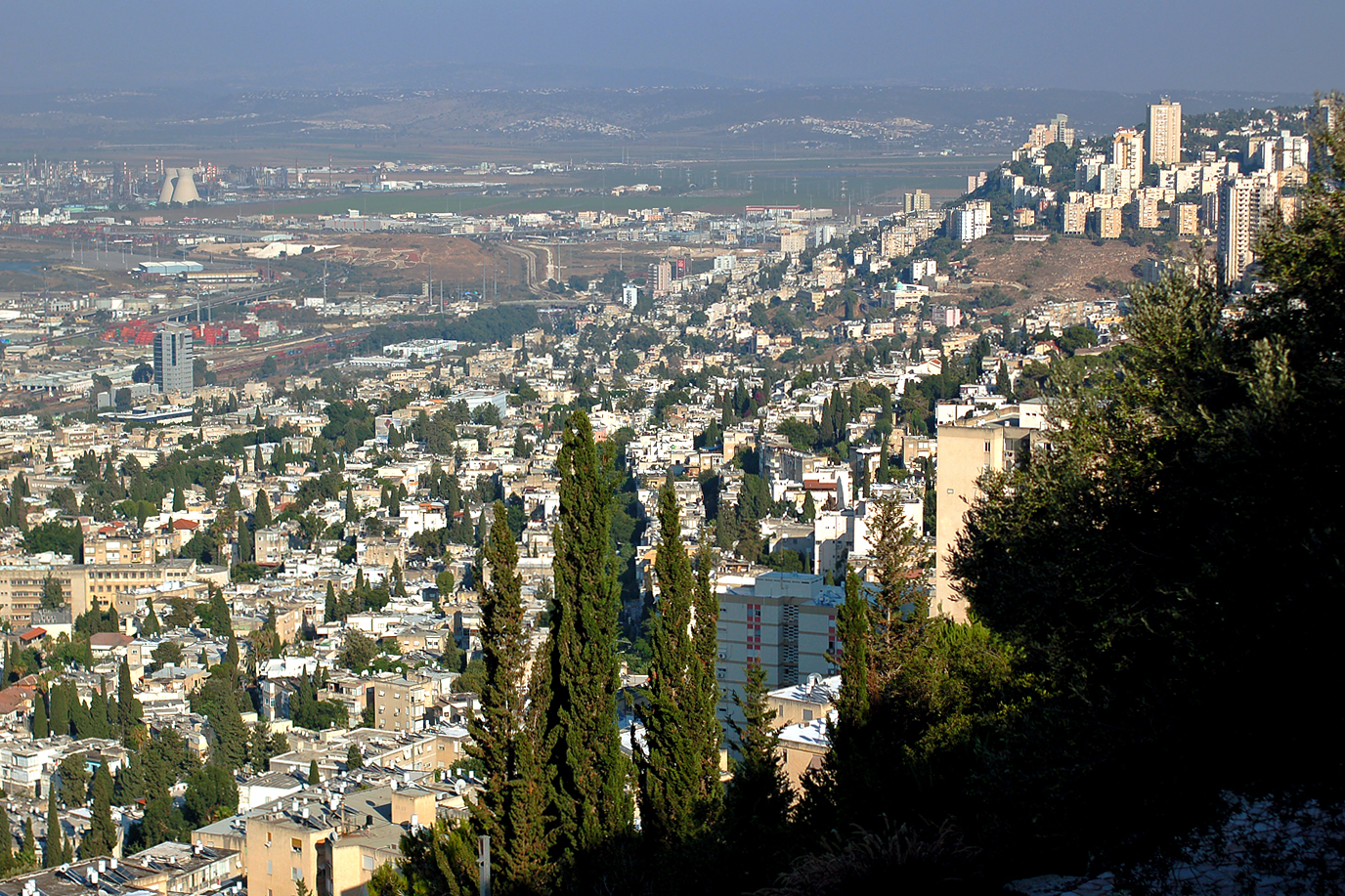
Northern Jezreel Valley and Mount Carmel, seen from Haifa

Following the purchase of the land, the Jewish farmers created the first modern-day settlements, founded the modern day city of Afula and drained swamps to enable further land development of areas that had been uninhabitable for centuries. The first moshav, Nahalal, was settled in this valley on 11 September 1921.

After the widespread Arab riots of 1929 in the then British Mandate of Palestine, the Hope Simpson Enquiry was appointed to seek causes and remedies for the instability. The commission's findings in regard to "Government responsibility towards Arab cultivators", was that the Jewish authorities "have nothing with which to reproach themselves" in the purchase of the valley, noting the high prices paid and land occupants receiving compensation not legally bound. The responsibility of the Mandate Government for "soreness felt (among both effendi and fellahin) owing to the sale of large areas by the absentee Sursock family" and the displacement of Arab tenants; noted that, "the duty of the Administration of Palestine to ensure that the rights and position of the Arabs are not prejudiced by Jewish immigration. It is doubtful whether, in the matter of the Sursock lands, this Article of the Mandate received sufficient consideration."

=== State of Israel ===
In 2006, the Israeli Transportation Ministry and Jezreel Valley Regional Council announced plans to build an international airport near Megiddo but the project was shelved due to environmental objections.

== Archaeological excavations ==
Archaeological sites in the Jezreel Valley are currently excavated and coordinated by the Jezreel Valley Regional Project.

In 2021, archaeologist from Israel Antiquities Authority (IAA) led by researchers Tzachi Lang and Kojan Haku found in the village of Et Taiyiba an engraved stone from the late 5th century from the frame of an entrance door of a church, with a Greek inscription. The inscription reads, "Christ born of Mary. This work of the most God-fearing and pious bishop [Theodo]sius and the miserable Th[omas] was built from the foundation. Whoever enters should pray for them." According to archaeologist Dr. Walid Atrash, Theodosius was one of the first Christian bishops and this church was the first evidence of the Byzantine church's existence in the village of Et Taiyiba.

=== Archaeological sites ===
- Abu Zurayq
- Beit She'arim (Roman-era Jewish village)
- Ein el-Jarba
- Jezreel (city)
- Tel Kedesh
- Legio
- Tel Megiddo
- Megiddo Church
- Tel Qashish
- Tel Qiri
- Tel Risim
- Tel Shadud
- Tel Shem
- Tel Shimron
- Tel Shor
- Tel Shush
- Ti'inik
- Tel Yokneam

== See also ==
- Battle of Ain Jalut, major battle in 1260 between the Mongols and the Mamluks.
- Dead Sea
- Jezreel Valley Regional Council

== Bibliography ==
- Rapoport, Yossef (2025). Becoming Arab: The Formation of Arab Identity in the Medieval Middle East. Princeton: Princeton University Press. ISBN 9780691210636.
