= Tel Qashish =

Archaeological mound, Jezreel Valley, Israel

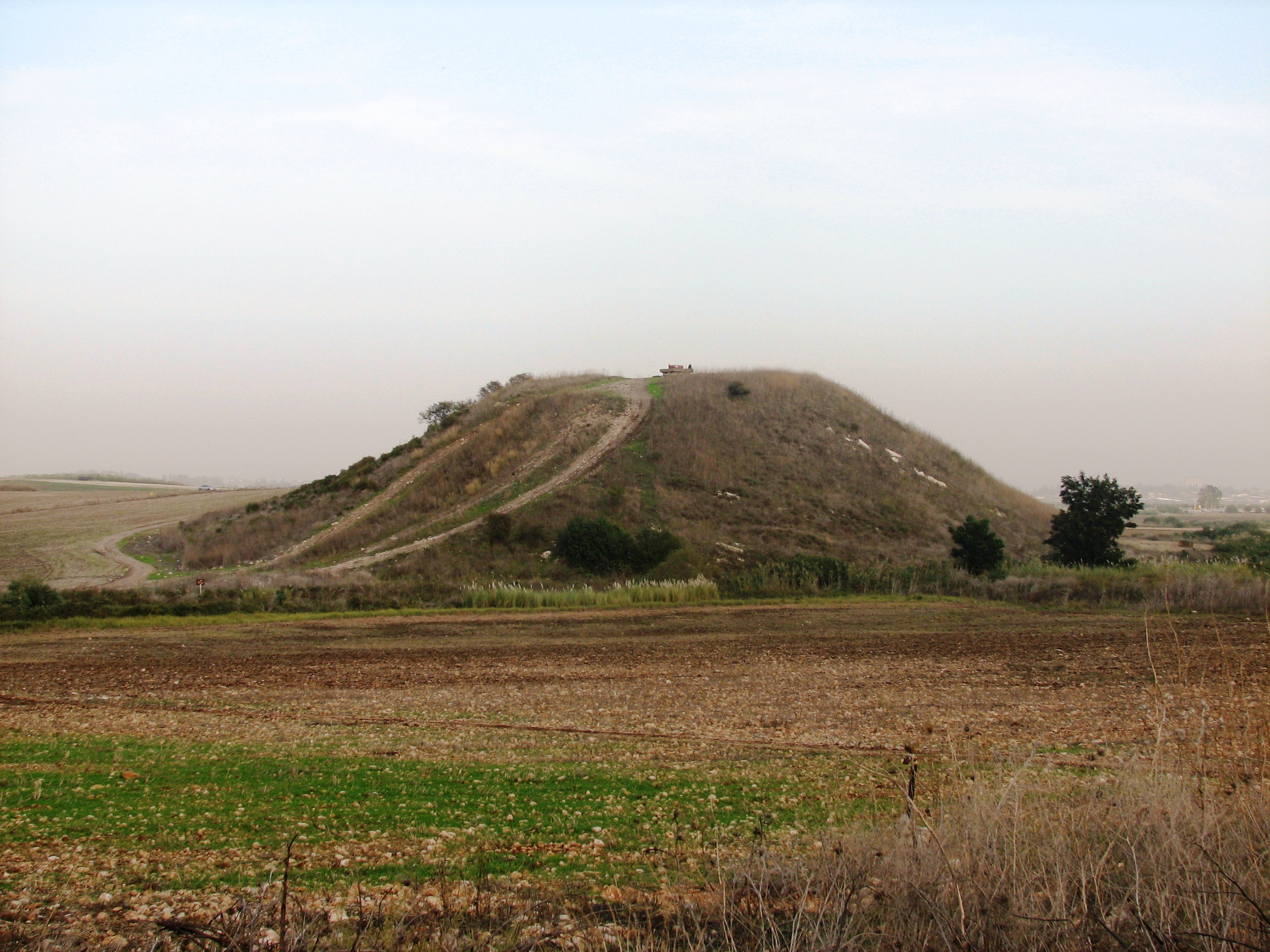
Tel Qashish/Tell el-Qassis from west

Tel Qashish, also spelled Tel Kashish (Hebrew: תל קשיש) or Tell el-Qassis in Arabic, is a tell (ancient mound) located in the northwestern Jezreel Valley, on the north bank of the Kishon River. The ancient settlement at Tel Qashish is believed to have been a satellite of the nearby city of Yokneam, which is situated about 2 kilometers (1.2 miles) to the south.

Archaeologist Yohanan Aharoni proposed that the site corresponds to "Helkath", one of the 119 cities conquered by Pharaoh Thutmose III. However, other scholars suggest it may be identified with "Dabeshet", mentioned in the Book of Joshua. Adjacent to the mound is Ein Qashish, a spring with evidence of prehistoric human activity dating back to the Middle Palaeolithic period.

== Geography ==
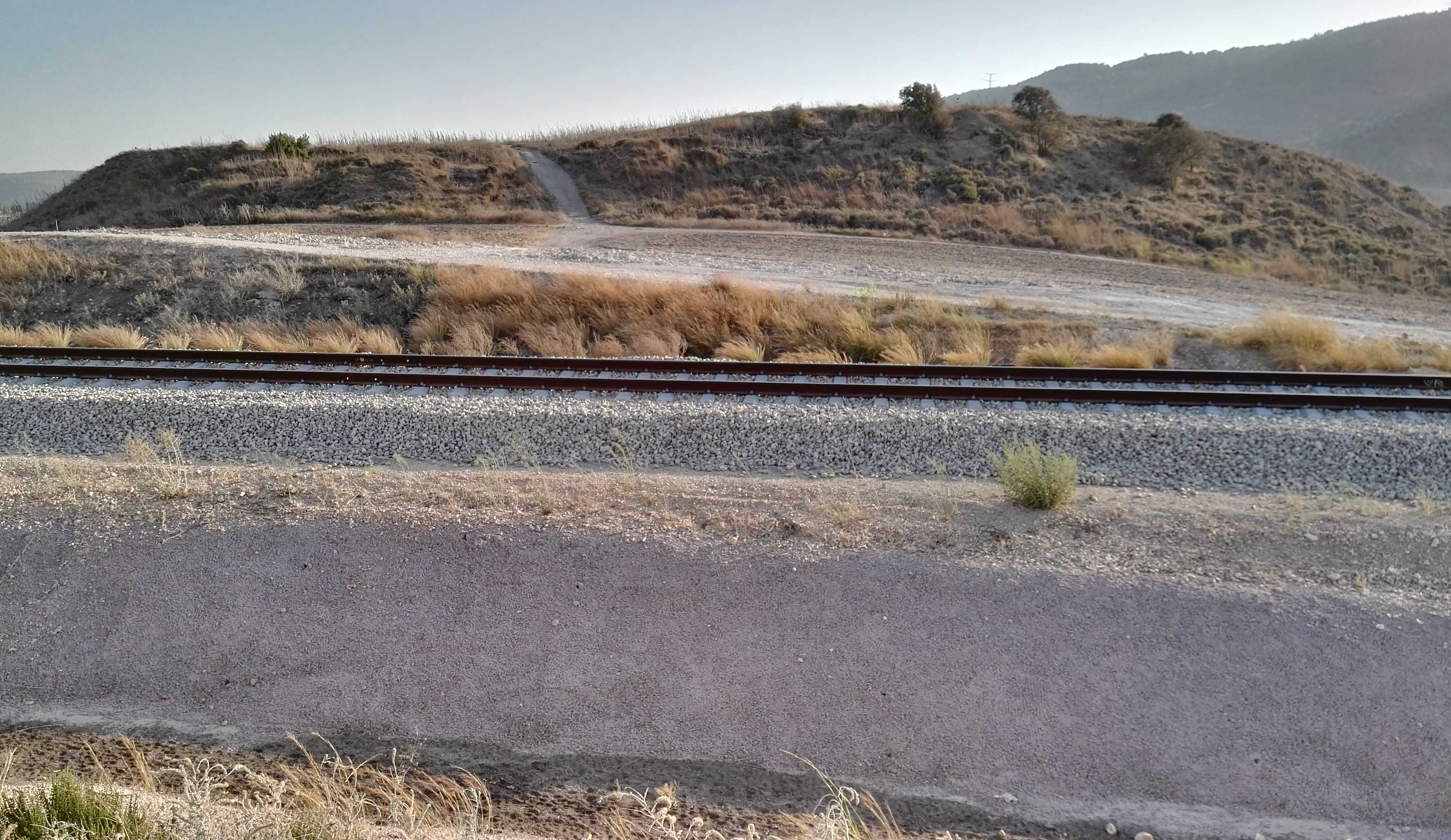
Tel Qashish from the north. The Beit She'an – Atlit railway line can be seen.

Tel Qashish occupies a strategically advantageous position on the north bank of the Kishon River, where the bend of the stream forms a natural boundary on its southern and western flanks. Located approximately 2 kilometers (1.2 miles) from Tel Yokneam, the region's major settlement, Tel Qashish likely had a dependent relationship with its larger neighbor.

The elongated mound covers an area of 10.7 acres (4.3 hectares) and measures 270 by 160 meters (890 by 520 ft) at its base. The western half of the mound stands approximately 5 meters (16 feet) higher than the eastern half. Steep slopes define all sides of the mound except the northeast, where the approach road to the site was likely located.

Historically, most settlements within the Jezreel Valley, including Tel Qashish, were established on the periphery rather than on the central valley floor. This pattern may be attributed to several factors, including drainage issues leading to unstable soil conditions, the presence of seasonal swamps, and increased vulnerability to attacks in the valley center.

== Archaeology ==
Annual ploughing by farmers from nearby agricultural settlements has damaged the remains of later settlements located on the tell. In some cases, this activity has even impacted the Late Bronze Age archaeological layers.

=== Palaeolithic (Mousterian) ===
Ein Qashish contains multiple campsites dating to the Mousterian culture (70,000–60,000 BCE). The site's layered stratigraphy indicates repeated human occupation throughout the Middle and Upper Palaeolithic periods. These nomadic inhabitants, likely drawn to the area during the summer months when the Kishon River was not prone to flooding, primarily subsisted on hunting, as evidenced by the abundance of animal bones. As with other similar sites, they left behind a significant assemblage of stone tools, and studies suggest that the flint was procured from a western source near Mount Carmel. A unique discovery at Ein Qashish was a cluster of human bones alongside traces of clay-based paint, hinting at possible ritualistic activity. The presence of Neanderthal remains, dated to 70,000–60,000 BP, further underscores the site's repeated use by early humans.

=== Neolithic ===
Archaeological excavations have revealed flint tools, including microliths and arrowheads, dating to the Neolithic period (12,000–4,500 BCE), resting directly on the bedrock foundation of the mound.

=== Early Bronze Age ===
Tel Qashish's earliest excavated settlement dates to the Bronze Age I period (3300–3000 BCE). This unfortified settlement appears to have covered the largest area in the site's history. Although the unearthed remains are insufficient to determine the settlement's layout, the presence of randomly placed, single-roomed houses suggests a dense plan, similar to other sites from this period. The ceramics are predominantly domestic Canaanite ware, with influences from northern, possibly Lebanese, cultures, likely due to the site's location on an international trade route. The settlement was self-sufficient and relied on agriculture.

Uniquely among sites in the Jezreel Valley, Tel Qashish remained populated during the transition from the Early Bronze Age I to the Early Bronze Age II period (3000–2700 BCE), possibly due to its strategic location. However, the settlement contracted during this period, no longer encompassing the surrounding area but confined to the mound itself. Unlike the earlier settlement, the new iteration was planned and fortified. Differences in the layout of structures between the lower and upper parts of the mound may indicate a social distinction between the residents of these areas. However, no such distinction is evident in the ceramic finds, which consist mainly of plates, bowls, and jars. The settlement had a small, likely household-based pottery industry. Evidence suggests a lack of luxury goods among the villagers, with only a single carnelian bead and a decorated bone unearthed from the entire Early Bronze Age period.

The transition to the Early Bronze Age III period (2700–2200 BCE) was peaceful and gradual. The village layout remained largely unchanged, with some extensions to the fortifications, enlarged rooms, and the construction of new installations. The village was likely abandoned sometime before the end of the Early Bronze Age III period, as there are no signs of destruction. This period coincides with the rise of the nearby, more significant settlement of Tel Yokneam. The Tel Qashish villagers may have chosen to relocate to this better-defended settlement. Alternatively, the unstable political climate of the time, marked by competition between cities due to the disruption of economic ties with Egypt during the Early Bronze Age II period, may have influenced their decision.

The importance of agriculture in the Early Bronze Age settlement is evident from the stone tools. Forty percent of these implements are sickle blades, exhibiting intensive wear patterns indicative of frequent use. Recovered plant remains include olive stones, barley, wheat, and vetch seeds, suggesting cultivation near the mound. These crops (excluding vetch) were likely grown throughout the entire Early Bronze Age period (3300–2200 BCE).

=== Middle Bronze Age ===
The Middle Bronze Age saw a reoccupation of the settlement at Tel Qashish. The earliest layer from this period consists solely of floors, lacking any clear architectural features such as buildings or walls. A substantial amount of pottery was unearthed on these floors, raising the possibility that additional structures or a defensive system from this layer lie outside the excavated area. Ceramic dating places this layer at the end of the Middle Bronze Age IIA period (2000–1750 BCE), implying that Tel Qashish was either completely or very sparsely settled for nearly five centuries.

A fortified settlement emerged at Tel Qashish during the transitional period between the Middle Bronze Age IIA and IIB. The stone-built wall measured 1.7 meters in width and included a glacis for added fortification. One of the wall's towers has been identified. Following a common Canaanite burial practice, the inhabitants interred their dead in jars within tombs. Two well-preserved tombs were discovered: one contained the remains of a two-year-old infant, and the other held those of a forty-year-old woman.

=== Late Bronze Age ===
Following the transition to the Late Bronze Age I period (1550–1400 BCE), the Middle Bronze Age fortification system fell into disuse. Houses were subsequently built on its remains, featuring thicker walls than those of preceding periods.

North of the mound, a small cave was discovered containing ceramics attributable to the Late Bronze Age II period (1400–1200 BCE). The cave measures 3 meters in length, with a width ranging from 1.4 to 2 meters and a maximum height of 3 meters. Its ceiling had collapsed in antiquity. Within the cave, approximately 200 complete ritual implements were found. These included six tall pedestals with "windows", likely serving as bases for other ceramics. The pedestals' height, ranging from 60 to 80 centimeters, and the presence of "windows" suggest a possible depiction of towers. Additionally, about 40 goblets were unearthed, one of which features a remarkably detailed facial design. These finds collectively suggest a period of minor ritual activity, potentially coinciding with a peaceful era.

=== Iron Age ===
The Iron Age remains at Tel Qashish are poorly preserved and show significant damage. This evidence suggests that the settlement was much less substantial during the Iron Age compared to the preceding Bronze Age. During the early Iron Age (1200–1000 BCE), Tel Qashish functioned primarily as a farm with only a few structures. Most archaeological finds from this period are concentrated on the higher mound, indicating that this area likely served as the central zone of the small village. The settlement expanded in the late Iron Age (1000–539 BCE), occupying both the higher and lower elevations of the mound. Notably, ceramics unearthed from this later period include pottery likely used for ritualistic purposes rather than everyday domestic activities.

=== Later periods ===
Archaeological evidence suggests that the site may have been occupied during the Persian period (539–332 BCE), although only minor artifacts from this era were unearthed in pits. Similarly, the Hellenistic period (332–70 BCE) has yielded just a few coins. Surface finds indicate some human activity during the Mamluk and Ottoman periods, but no architectural remains from these later eras have been identified.

The site was used during the 1947–1949 Palestine war as a military outpost. Evidence includes defensive positions and trenches, with a concrete bunker constructed at the highest point still standing today.

== History of archaeological research ==
British archaeologist John Garstang conducted a small-scale excavation in the 1920s, uncovering pottery exclusively from the Early Bronze Age (3300–2100 BCE). In the early 1950s, German-Israeli archaeologist Raphael Giveon surveyed the site and identified pottery from a broader range, including the Middle Bronze Age (2100–1550 BCE) to the Hellenistic period (330–31 BCE). Avner Raban's survey in the 1970s, as part of the Yoqne’am Regional Project, which included Tel Yokneam, Tel Qiri, the western Jezreel Valley, and Tel Qashish, supported Giveon's findings. The most extensive archaeological work took place between 1978 and 1987, during eight seasons of excavations led by Amnon Ben-Tor under the auspices of the Institute of Archaeology of the Hebrew University of Jerusalem and the Israel Exploration Society.

In February 2004, the Israel Antiquities Authority surveyed the area around Ein Qashish, located approximately 100 meters south of the mound and the Kishon River, in advance of a major road and railway project. This survey uncovered scattered flint tools dating to the Middle Palaeolithic period. In 2010, another rescue excavation by the Israel Antiquities Authority, prompted by the construction of a gas pipeline north of the mound, revealed evidence of ritual activity from the Early Bronze Age.

== Bibliography ==
- A. Ben-Tor, M. Avisar, Ruhama Bonfíl, I. Zerzetsky and Y. Portugali, A Regional Study of Tel Yoqneʿam and Its Vicinity, Qadmoniot 77–79, 1987 pp. 2–17 (Hebrew) JSTOR 23677912
- Amnon Ben-Tor, Ruhama Bonfíl and Sharon Zuckerman, Tel Qashish: A Village in the Jezreel Valley, Qedem, 2003, pp. 1–451
  - Amnon Ben-Tor, Ruhama Bonfil and Sharon Zuckerman, Introduction, pp. 1–4
  - Sharon Zuckerman, Tel Qashish and the Jezreel Valley in the Early Bronze Age, pp. 7–9
  - Sharon Zuckerman, Tel Qashish in the Early Bronze Age, pp. 178–182
  - Amnon Ben-Tor and Ruhama Bonfil, The Stratigraphy And Pottery Assemblages of the Middle And Late Bronze Ages in Area A, pp. 185–276
- Edwin van den Brink, Uzi Ad, Muhammad Hater and Orit Segal, A Hoard of Late Bronze Age Temple Utensils Found at the Foot of Tel Qashish, Qadmoniot 147, 2014, pp. 19–24 (Hebrew)
