= Tel Yokneam =

Archaeological site in Israel

- תֵּל יָקְנְעָם (Hebrew)
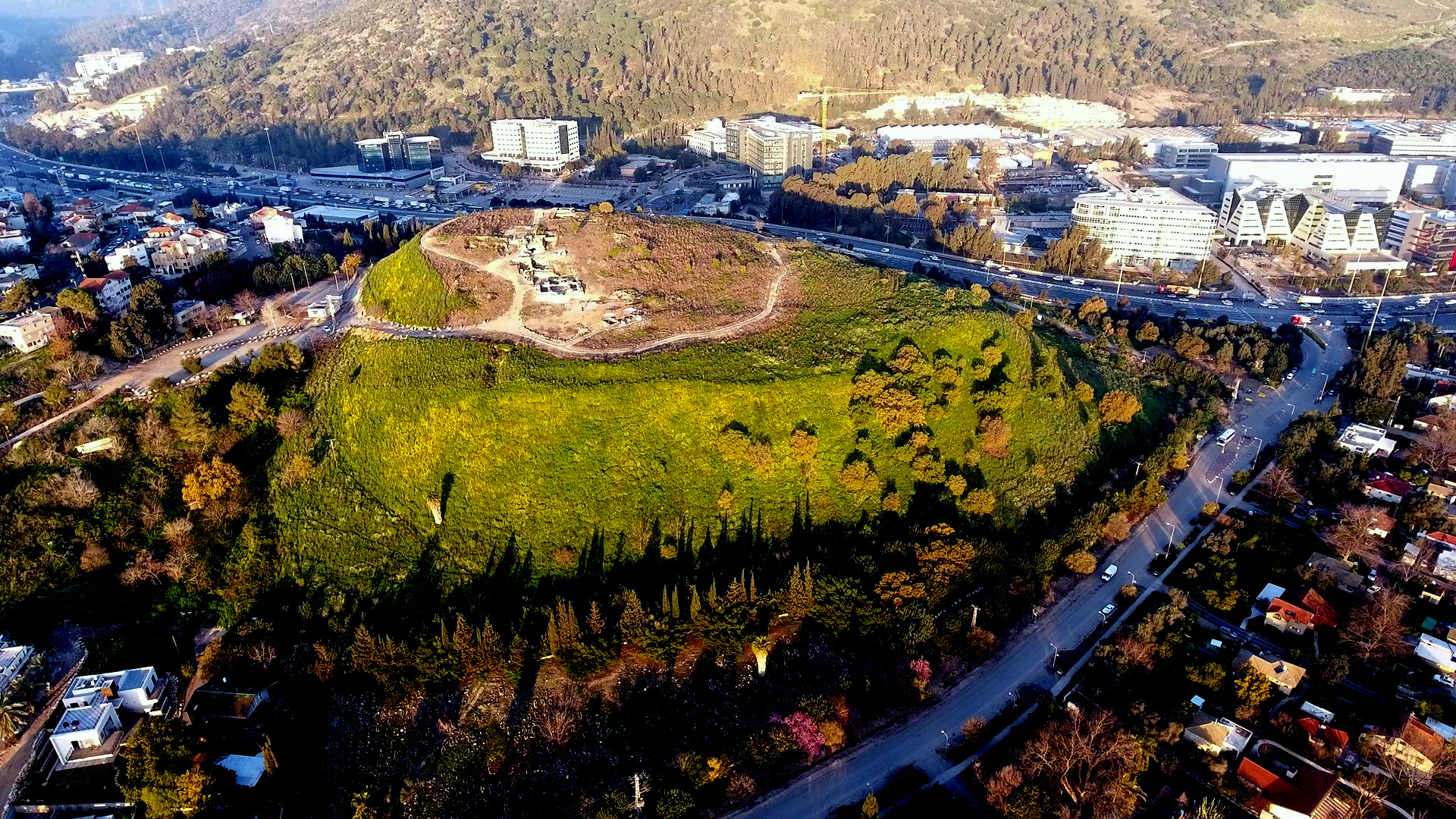
- Tel Yokneam seen from Mount Carmel, with modern Yokneam Illit to the right and the town of Yokneam Moshava to the left

- Shown in Israel Tel Yokneam (Eastern Mediterranean)
- 32°39′51″N 35°06′6.3″E
- Type: Tell
- Periods: Chalcolithic, Bronze Age, Iron Age, Persian, Hellenistic, Roman, Byzantine, Early Islamic, Crusader, Mamluk, Ottoman
- Location: Israel
- Region: Jezreel Valley, Israel

History
- Built: Rock-cut tombs c. 2000 BCE, fortified city c. 1900 BCE
- Abandoned: Ottoman period

Site notes
- Height: 60 meters (200 ft)
- Area: 10 acres (4.0 ha)
- Archaeologists: Amnon Ben-Tor; Yuval Portugali; Miriam Avissar

Tel Yokneam, also spelled Yoqne'am or Jokneam (Hebrew: תֵּל יָקְנְעָם), is an archaeological site located in the northern part of the modern city of Yokneam Illit, Israel. It is known in Arabic as Tell Qamun (Arabic: تل قامون), believed to be a corruption of the Hebrew name. The site is an elevated mound, or tell, spanning around 40 dunams (10 acres/4 ha) and rising steeply to a height of 60 meters (200 ft). With a few brief interruptions, Yokneam was occupied for 4,000 years, from the Middle Bronze Age to the Ottoman period.

The ancient settlement at Tel Yokneam is first mentioned in Egyptian sources as a city conquered by Pharaoh Thutmose III. It appears later in the Hebrew Bible as a city defeated by Israelite leader Joshua and settled by the Tribe of Levi. It is mentioned twice in Roman sources. During the Crusades, it was called Caymont, or Cain Mons, recalling a legend that Yokneam was the site of Cain's death. For a period, it was the center of the Lordship of Caymont, the smallest seigneurie of the Crusader kingdom of Jerusalem.

The earliest archaeological features of Yokneam date from the Chalcolithic period, in the fourth millennium BCE. The first structures date from the beginning of the second millennium BCE. During the Middle and Late Bronze Ages (2000–1200 BCE), Yokneam was for the most part a fortified city, which was razed during a period known as the Late Bronze Age collapse. During the Iron Age, the city was razed and rebuilt several times; events which are attributed to the biblical accounts of the conquests by Joshua, King David, Hazael of Aram-Damascus, and the Neo-Assyrian Empire. The period between the 10th and 8th centuries BCE is considered Yokneam's golden age, during which it extended beyond the mound's limits. The city was protected at that time by a massive fortification system. During Persian rule (539–330 BC) Yokneam was a dense, unfortified, and cosmopolitan city, housing Jews, Phoenicians, and Persians. Very little has been found in Yokneam from the Hellenistic, Roman, and Byzantine periods (333 BCE–634 CE), because the settlement was probably located on a different hill, south of Tel Yokneam. The remains of a Byzantine church were found in the southern part of the mound. After the Islamic conquest of 634 AD, a well-planned city was established on the mound by the Abbasid Caliphate. It was gradually abandoned and was struck by an earthquake in 1033 CE. In the 12th century CE, the Crusaders built a fortified city on the site, the largest since the Iron Age. The city eventually fell to the Muslims, and was rebuilt by the Mamluks during the 14th century CE. After the Ottoman conquest of 1517 CE, a fortress was built in the 18th century, and later abandoned in the 19th century.

The site, which had remained abandoned, was surveyed by the Palestine Exploration Fund in 1878, and by Avner Raban in the 1970s. It was first excavated as part of a "Yoqne'am Regional Project" run by the Hebrew University of Jerusalem and the Israel Exploration Society. The excavations, between 1977 and 1988, were directed by the archaeologist Amnon Ben-Tor. Some of the digs were also headed by Renate Rosenthal and Yuval Portugali. Two other sites were studied in that project: Tel Qashish and Tel Qiri. Further excavations were conducted on the acropolis by Miriam Avissar in 1993.

Today. there is an archaeological park and a visitor center on the mound. The park is operated by the Israel Antiquities Authority and the municipality of Yokneam Illit. It was created as part of a conservation project, with the participation of school students from Yokneam Illit.

== Etymology ==
The name Yokneam (Hebrew: יָקְנְעָם) is Hebrew in origin, from the Hebrew Bible. During the Bronze Age, it was probably called something like 'En-qn'mu, as it appears in the list of 119 cities conquered by Pharaoh Thutmose III. This form of the name possibly derives from the nearby springs (or "en") and is perhaps a corruption of "'En Yoqneam" ("Spring of Yoqneam").

The site is mentioned in the Onomasticon of Eusebius as a village called Kammona. Jerome described it as Cimona. Following the Muslim conquest, the site was called Qaymun. After the First Crusade, around 1130 Fetellus referred to it as Cain Mons (Kaym Mons or Kaim Monte, literally "Cain's Mountain"), identifying the site with a legend of Cain's slaying at the hand of his descendant, Lamech. The name "Cain Mons" is probably a corruption of the Arabic "Qaymun", or "Caimum" as the name appeared in the first Latin sources. The name was later transformed into Caymont.

In 1799, Pierre Jacotin labeled the site Chateau d'El Kireh (Castle of Qira). The castle mentioned is probably the Ottoman castle attributed to Daher al-Umar. "Qira" refers to a village of that name that then existed nearby.

The site name appears in 19th century sources as a variant, Tell Qamun, which was probably the local Arab name.

== Geography ==
Tel Yokneam is located in the western Jezreel Valley. The region's abundant water, moderate climate, and fertile soils allow inhabitants to grow a variety of crops in the valley and herd cattle on the slopes of the Menashe Heights and Mount Carmel.

Tel Yokneam rises to a height of 60 meters (200 ft). The mound spans approximately 10 acres, or 40 dunams. Including its slopes, the site as a whole is relatively large, covering some 20 acres (80 dunams). The mound can be divided into three parts: a lower terrace in the north, an upper terrace in the center, and an acropolis (upper city) at the southwestern end. The top of the mound slopes steeply upward from north to south, a feature which led ancient Yokneam's builders to create the terraces on which its structures were built.

=== Strategic location ===
Map of ancient roads in the southern Levant

Yokneam stands at the junction of two major ancient (and modern) routes. The ancient international coastal highway ("Via Maris") avoided the difficult coastal stretch along Mount Carmel's western flank by crossing the mountain along one of two pass roads, a western one ending at Yokneam, and one east of it coming out at Megiddo. The western pass was used by those heading for Phoenicia, the eastern one by those bound for Damascus and places further north. The pass exiting near Yokneam follows in its final part a valley called in Arabic Wadi Milh, "Salt Wadi" (unsuccessfully Hebraised to Nahal Yokne'am). Another major route, the hill road that went along the ridge of the Judean and Samarian Mountains, split once it reached the Jezreel Valley, with one continuation heading towards the sea along the foot of the northeastern slopes of the Manasseh Heights and the Carmel, via both Megiddo and Yokneam. In modern terms, the ridge road or "Way of the Patriarchs" largely corresponds to Highway 60, the ancient route connecting it via Ta'anakh, Megiddo, and Yokneam with the coast is now followed by the Jenin-Haifa road (Highway 66 for the first section), and the pass road entering the Jezreel Valley at Yokneam is now Highway 70. Only the main seaport connected to Yokneam isn't Acre ('Akko) anymore, but Haifa south of it.

This location, at the crossroads of significant trade routes, is the main reason for Yokneam's continuous settlement over some four millennia. Approximately two kilometers (1 mi) north and south respectively are Tel Qashish and Tel Qiri, other village sites believed to have been dependencies of Yokneam.

== History and archaeology ==
The earliest traces of human settlement found at Tel Yokneam are from the Chalcolithic period (4500–3300 BCE). They consist only of a few cone-shaped vessels and jar handles. No architectural features can be attributed to the chalcolithic settlement, if one existed. Unexcavated areas of the site may hold more significant remains of this period, as excavations to date have reached bedrock in a very limited location only.

=== Early Bronze Age ===
A diverse range of pottery from this period has been found, in pockets of fill sitting on the bedrock of the tel. Finds include bowls, platters, cooking pots, and jars that date from the entire period (3300–2100 BCE). A cylinder seal with a geometric motif, and a stamped seal were also found. Most of the finds correspond to the Early Bronze Age layer of the nearby Tel Qashish. An Egyptian vessel made of diorite, was discovered on top of the mound in the 1930s. It has been dated to the late stages of the First Dynasty of Egypt or early stages of the Second Dynasty, sometime in the first half of the third millennium BCE. No architectural features attributed to the Early Bronze Age have been unearthed during excavations on the site. There is a gap in the archaeological record of at least a century between the Early Bronze Age and later remains.

=== Middle Bronze Age ===
The Middle Bronze Age remains at Tel Yokneam were found directly on the limestone bedrock.

In the Middle Bronze, Yokneam can be divided into Strata XXV–XXI, with the earliest architectural remains uncovered dating to MB IIA. Form strata XXIV (MB IIA) to the end of MB IIB, Yoqneam was fortified with three successive fortifications systems. The city was unfortified in the MB IIC (Stratum XXI).

==== Early settlement and burial cave ====
Underneath the wall of Yokneam which was constructed sometime before between the 20th and 18th century BCE, a layer of burnet mudbrick material (different than the material used in the later period) mixed with potsherds, bones and ash. It appears that these are the remains of structures made out of mudbrick. The presence of ash and the skeleton of a young male may indicate that this settlement was violently destroyed by fire. Around these remains were two openings to a burial cave. The settlement and burial cave are dated to the Middle Bronze Age IIA period (2000–1800 BCE).

The burial cave was cut in the soft limestone. It had at least three chambers, of them two were excavated. It was accessed by the excavators through holes in the ceiling of each chamber. No other entrance was discovered because of the limitations of the excavation but it is possible it was accessed through a shaft. The opinings may also provide ventilation and lighting. One of the chambers had two niches with a skeletons of a young female aged 20–25 and one aged 14–15. Next to the burials were offerings and the older female had a stone "pillow" under her skull. The other chamber was filled with soil containing potsherds and the complete skeleton of a sheep.

This burial cave is unique in its shape and in the burial goods found inside of it. The burial in niches is more common in later periods but considered very rare in the Middle Bronze Age. Three other examples exist in Tel Amr, Tirat Ha-Carmel and mostly in Tel Te'enim. All of these sites, including Yokneam are located in the western part of the Jezreel Valley and the adjacent northern coastal plain. It is possible that those who were buried in those niches were people of a high status (religious, social or economic).

==== Fortified city ====
Yokneam was a fortified city from around 1900–1650 BCE. The fortifications were built on top of the burial cave, sealing one of its entrances. During this period, three different fortification systems were built. The first two of these were massive constructions of mudbrick on a stone base, with a glacis built into their outer face. The third fortification, dating to between 1750 and 1650 BCE, was less significant.

A period of the site's history during which the city was unfortified began in the final years of the Middle Bronze Age, and lasted well into the Iron Age. In the first unfortified settlement phase, between 1650 and 1550 BCE, inhabitants buried the dead, particularly children, under the floors of houses in burial jars or tombs, with offerings laid beside the bodies. One notable offering was an artistic vessel in the shape of what appears to be a donkey, from whose mouth liquid could be poured. A one-meter-deep (3 ft 3 in) layer of dirt fill separates the Middle and Late Bronze Age phases on the site. The settlement above that fill presents a completely new urban plan compared to that of the earlier habitation.

In an assemblage from a later period, a beetle stamp was found on a bowl bearing the name of Pharaoh Amenemhat III, who reigned from 1860 to 1814 BCE. His reign is regarded as the golden age of the Middle Kingdom of Egypt.

=== Late Bronze Age ===
Late Bronze Age Yokneam lasted from the 15th to the 13th century BCE. The well-preserved houses excavated from this period contained an abundance of pottery, including a collection of Chocolate-on-white ware. Some of these artifacts were imports from foreign lands, including Cyprus and Mycenae. Two Egyptian tools were found, although it is not clear whether these are originals or locally made copies. Silver earrings, typical of the Mitanni culture, were also found.

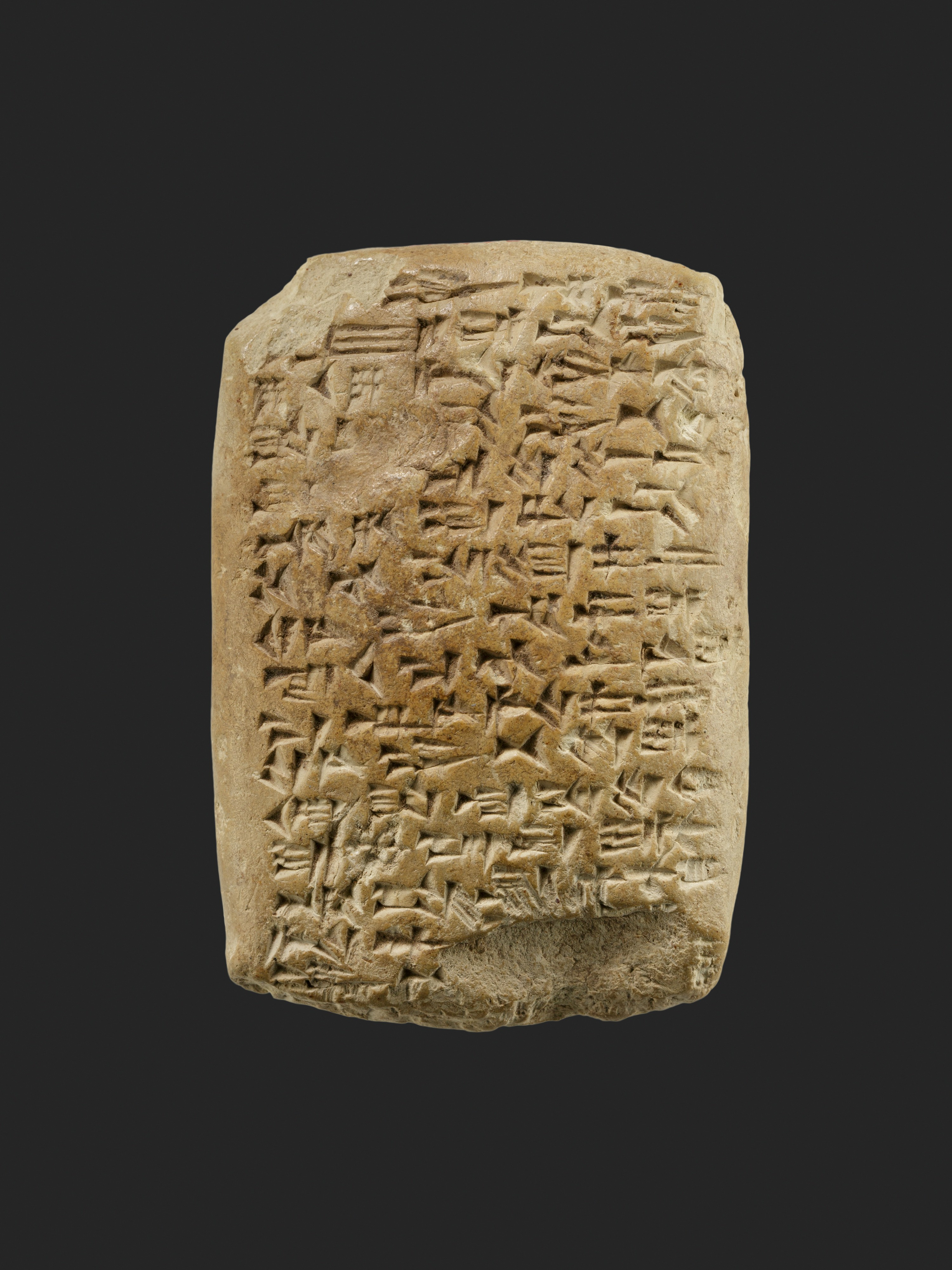
Amarna letter similar to those sent by Bal'u-mehir, supposed king of Yokneam, c. mid-13th century BCE

The city is mentioned as "En-qn'mu" in the list of cities conquered by Pharaoh Thutmose III during his campaign in the 15th century BCE. Archaeological finds confirm that the city was devastated during the early years of the Late Bronze Age (1550–1400 BCE), with subsequent rebuilding after a gap in occupation. A figurine of the Egyptian goddess Hathor from that period was found.

Late Bronze Age Yokneam may be identified with one of the city-states mentioned in the Amarna letters (1360–1332 BCE). A petrographic study of the letters suggests that Yokneam was a city-state, and that one of its kings was called Ba'lu-mehir (mehir is a West Semitic word for "warrior"). Ba'lu-mehir sent four letters, written on clay tablets. The association with Yokneam is based on indications that the material for the tablets was mined in one of two specific locations on Mount Carmel. One of these is located only two kilometers (1.2 mi) from Tel Yokneam. In one of the letters, the city named is G-ma-te. The relationship between the name G-ma-te and 'En-qn'mu or Yokneam is unclear. Ba'lu-mehir was summoned to Megiddo along with King Labaya of the city of Shechem, who was accused by Egypt of acts of aggression against other kingdoms. Ba'lu-mehir was probably an ally of his.

==== Destruction ====
Archaeological investigations suggest that the city was destroyed in a large fire sometime between the second half of the 13th century BCE and the beginning of the 12th century BCE. Late Bronze Age Yokneam's destruction by fire, as with many other Ancient Near Eastern cities, occurred during a period known as the Late Bronze Age collapse, which marks the transition from the Bronze to the Iron Age. Ceramic evidence does not permit precise dating of the razing of the city, which occurred between 1350 and 1200 BCE.

=== Iron Age ===
Following its destruction at the end of the Bronze Age, the city was rebuilt somewhere between the 12th and the early 11th centuries BCE. It appears that the reconstruction took place within a few decades, as the new structures followed the alignment of the old buildings. The Iron Age city has three distinct periods. In the first, the majority of finds were locally made Canaanite tools and pottery, characteristic of the Late Bronze Age, although some artifacts of Phoenician and Philistine origin were also found. One notable structure of that period is known as the "House of Oil", as the tools and olive pits found in it indicate it was an oil mill. The house is connected to a cave, in which the residents buried their dead.

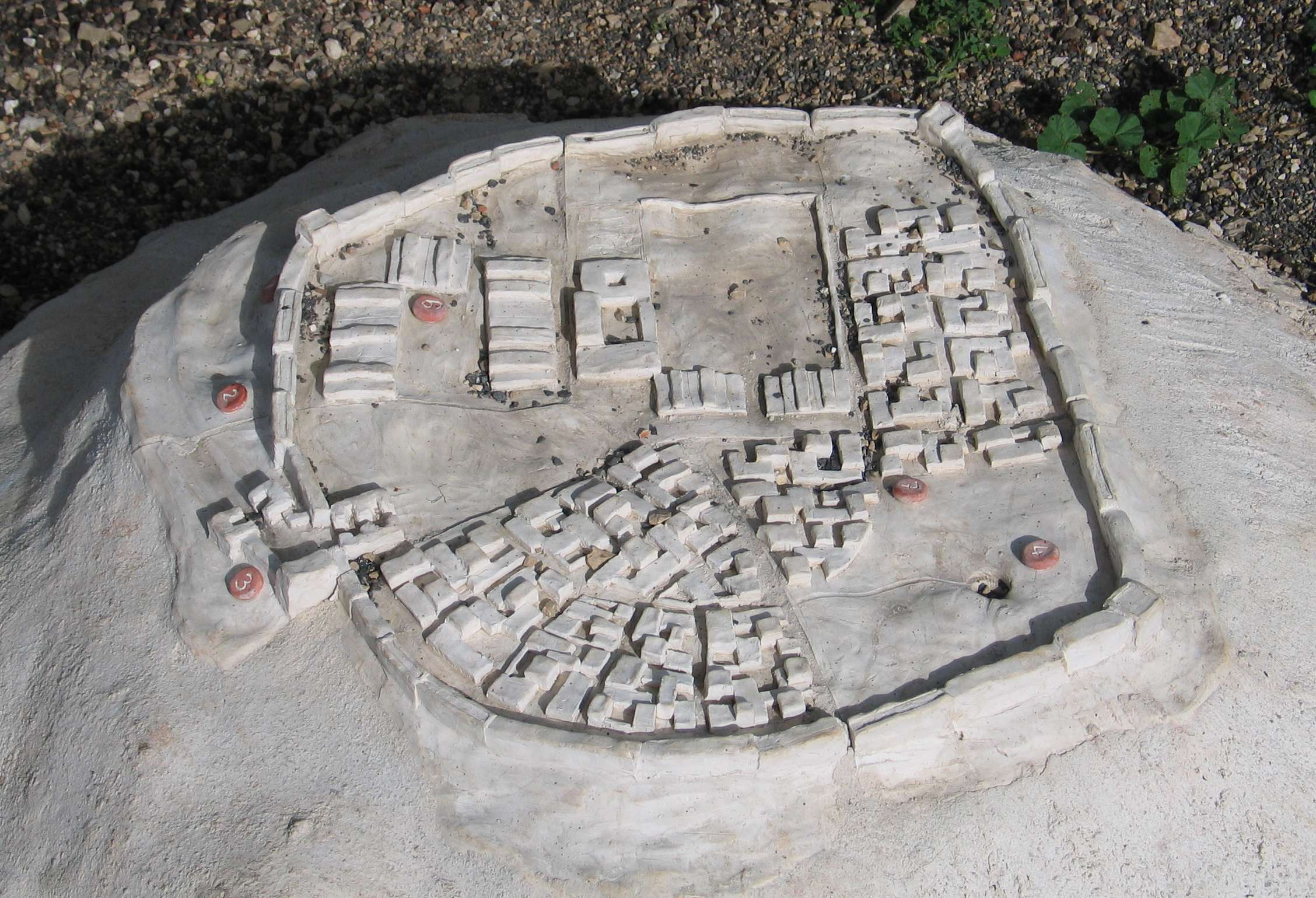
Model of Iron Age Yokneam

The destruction of Yokneam in the Late Bronze Age, and its establishment during the Iron Age I period, can be associated with the conquests of the Israelites under Joshua. Yokneam is mentioned three times in the Hebrew Bible, in the Book of Joshua. It first appears in a list of thirty-one city-states defeated by Joshua and the Israelites, which may explain the destruction of the Late Bronze Age city. Later, it is mentioned as a city in the territory of the Tribe of Zebulun, settled by members of the Merarite clan of the Tribe of Levi. Despite the biblical account, on the basis of Phoenician and Philistine pottery finds, archaeologists have theorized that the city was rebuilt by the Canaanites with the help of the Phoenicians and Philistines in order to block Israelite access to the Via Maris trade route.

The destruction of this settlement phase may be attributed to the conquests of the Israelite King David. For several decades the city was in a very poor state, until its rebuilding in the 10th century BCE. At that time, a five-meter-wide (16 ft) fortification was built, using stones mined and imported from the nearby Mount Carmel. A drainage system was installed to protect the fortifications from the rain. The wall reached a height of at least 4 meters (13 ft).

Yokneam was razed and resettled again in the 9th century BCE. The most probable reason for the destruction was the invasion of Aram-Damascus, under King Hazael, who reigned from 842 to 796 BCE. The city was rebuilt during the occupation. The new city had a double-wall defense system. The city's Iron Age fortifications were much stronger than those of nearby Megiddo because of Yokneam's location on the border between the Kingdom of Israel and Phoenicia. The end of this period in the city's history came with the Assyrian invasion under king Tiglath-Pileser III, in 732 BCE. At the time of this occupation, Yokneam was one of the largest cities in the Jezreel Valley. After this phase only a small settlement remained, and the fortifications were no longer in use. The identity of its inhabitants between the end of the 8th century BCE and the 7th century BCE is unknown.

=== Persian and Hellenistic periods ===
The Assyrian Empire fell to the Neo-Babylonian Empire, which in turn fell to the Achaemenid Empire under Cyrus the Great in 539 BCE. The Levant, and Yokneam with it, came under Persian rule.

Although Yokneam does not appear in any sources from the Persian period, it was an unfortified city at that time. The remains of a settlement from the Persian period, badly damaged by later construction, include several structures built on terraces. 70% of the pottery identified there consisted of storage jars, indicating that the area studied was the city's storage area. A comparative study of the pottery from this period indicates that the site was settled somewhere around the late 5th century BCE, but this study relies on the small quantity of pottery found in Yokneam. At some point, the structures were modified and the terraces were destroyed. The structures featured Phoenician-style architecture, which was quite common during that period. Personal names on pottery, written in Aramaic, include names of Hebrew, Persian, and Phoenician origin, indicating that Yokneam was a cosmopolitan city during the Persian period. Signs of a large fire are seen in one of the structures, where complete storage jars were found. This suggests the settlement's sudden destruction by fire. After this event, the site seems to have been partially or completely abandoned. Only a few pits remained. This violent destruction may be attributed to conflicts between the Persians and the Egyptians over the control of the land, and can be dated to 380 BCE.

The mound remained deserted until the Macedonian ruler Alexander the Great defeated Persia, conquering the region in 333 BCE. The pottery record indicates that the site was populated almost a century after the conquest, between the end of the 3rd century and the late 2nd century BCE. Over 20 jar-handles with stamps were found among the Hellenistic artifacts, dating to between 250 and 125 BCE. One stamp may be dated to the late 3rd century BCE, establishing an even earlier Hellenic presence. The walls of a large structure were discovered, with most of the building eroded down the slope. A more notable discovery was a square watchtower, overlooking the junction below the mound. Its base measured three square meters (32 sq ft). Some Hellenistic pottery was discovered on the northeastern slope of the mound. Pottery found in another building on the mound's eastern slope dated that structure to the Hellenistic period also. Among the potsherds were fragments of wine jars from the island of Rhodes.

Yokneam seems to have been sparsely populated during the Hellenistic period. The main settlement between the Hellenistic and Byzantine periods was apparently on the hill south of the mound, on which the first the modern-day town of Yokneam Illit is built. This conclusion is based on frequent finds of artifacts and remains from those periods during construction activity in this area.

=== Roman and Byzantine periods ===
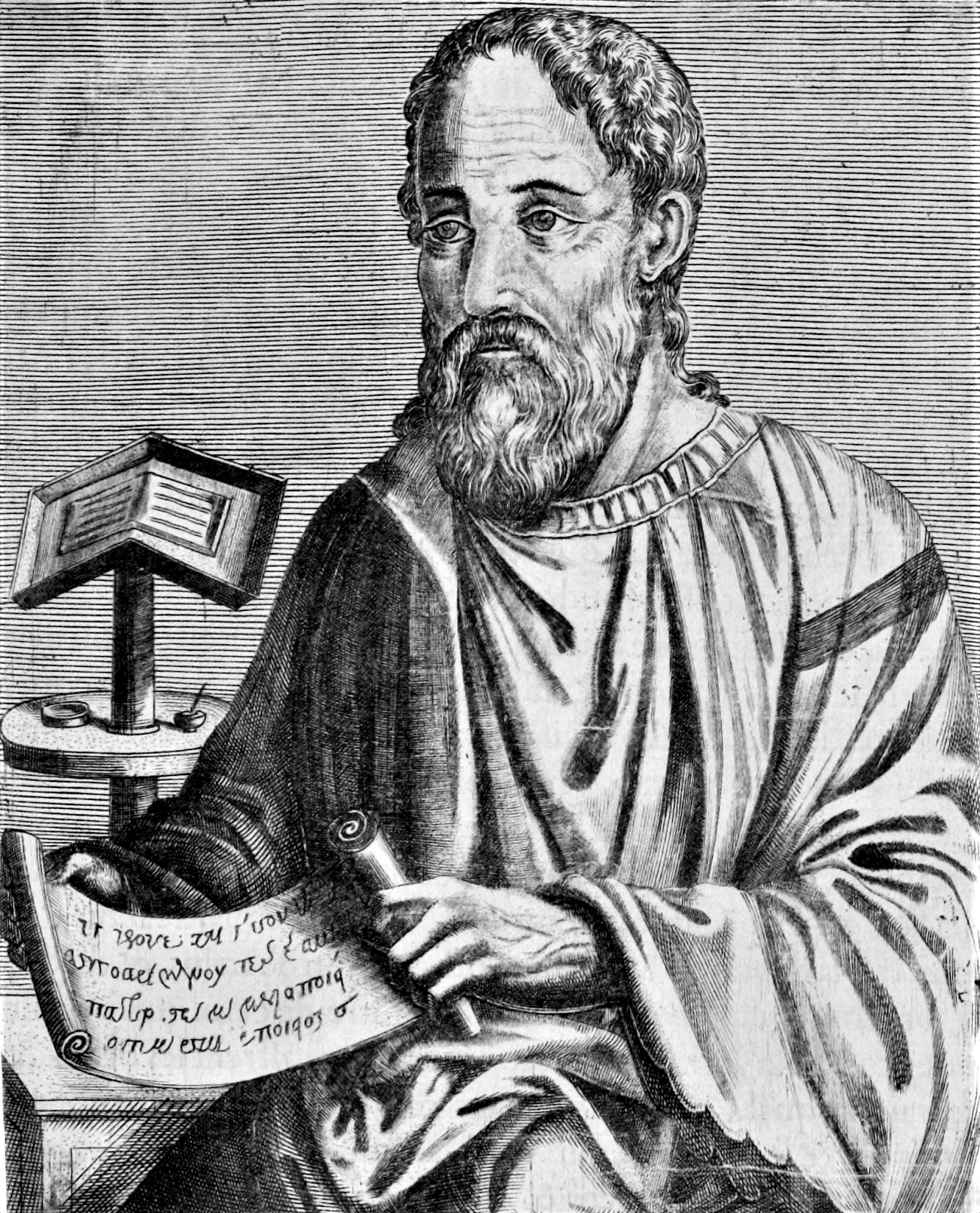
Eusebius of Caesarea, whose 3rd century CE Onomasticon lists Yokneam

Along with the rest of the region, Yokneam came under Roman rule in 63 BCE. Potsherds are the only artifacts dated to the Roman period that have been found in the main excavation area at Tel Yokneam. Roman structures have, however, been identified below the later Byzantine and Crusader church. Some walls were attributed to the Early Roman period because of pottery found beside them. These artifacts include a cup fragment, a bowl, a krater, a cooking pot, an oil lamp, and amphorae, dating from between 50 BCE and 150 CE. An underground room discovered under the church was identified as a Roman mausoleum. It was dated to the Late Roman period, based on a sarcophagus found among the building materials of the church, and on other Roman-like building features. One interpretation is that the church-builders discovered the mausoleum, cleared it of its contents, and reused elements from it as building materials. The considerable quantity of pottery found suggests occupation of the site during the Late Roman period. Five Roman coins were found, ranging in date between 20 and 354 CE.

Eusebius of Caesarea included biblical Yokneam in his Onomasticon in the 3rd century CE, writing that in his own time it was a village called Cammona, "situated in the great plain, six Roman miles north of Legio, on the way to Ptolemais".

A Byzantine church, built between the 4th and 7th centuries CE, was found below the ruins of a later Crusader church. It was built, in turn, on top of the Roman mausoleum. The church may originally have been built as the burial place of a saint. It was probably destroyed somewhere around the 7th century, during the Persian or Islamic conquests. Beneath a later Ottoman fortress were two pits, sealed off by a door, which contained many potsherds from the early Byzantine period.

=== Early Islamic period ===
In 634–636 CE, the Islamic Rashidun Caliphate won the region from the Byzantine Empire. Although not mentioned in sources, Yokneam at that time was a well-planned, unfortified city, with a street system and symmetrical buildings constructed on terraces. The city was established during the second half of the 9th century CE, probably during the rule of Ahmad ibn Tulun, who united Egypt, Syria, and the Levant in 878 CE. The Egyptian rulers consolidated their control over the country, which was subject to political instability.

This period in the site's history is unique. The settlement's layout, the orientation of its buildings, the architecture and construction methods differ not only from the preceding and succeeding phases of occupation but from any other settlement period. This may reflect the fact that a city had not existed on the site since the end of the Persian period, some 1000 years earlier. The houses were built using local stone, rather than material imported from nearby Mount Carmel as in previous periods; an observation common to this and later periods.

According to the evidence of pottery and glassware finds, the city was gradually abandoned. A major earthquake in 1033 CE is known to have devastated the region, and signs of an earthquake can be observed in the remains of the settlement. The settlement appears to have been finally abandoned sometime during the 11th century. Ceramics from this period are some of the most luxurious of their time.

=== Crusader and Mamluk periods ===
==== Historical record ====
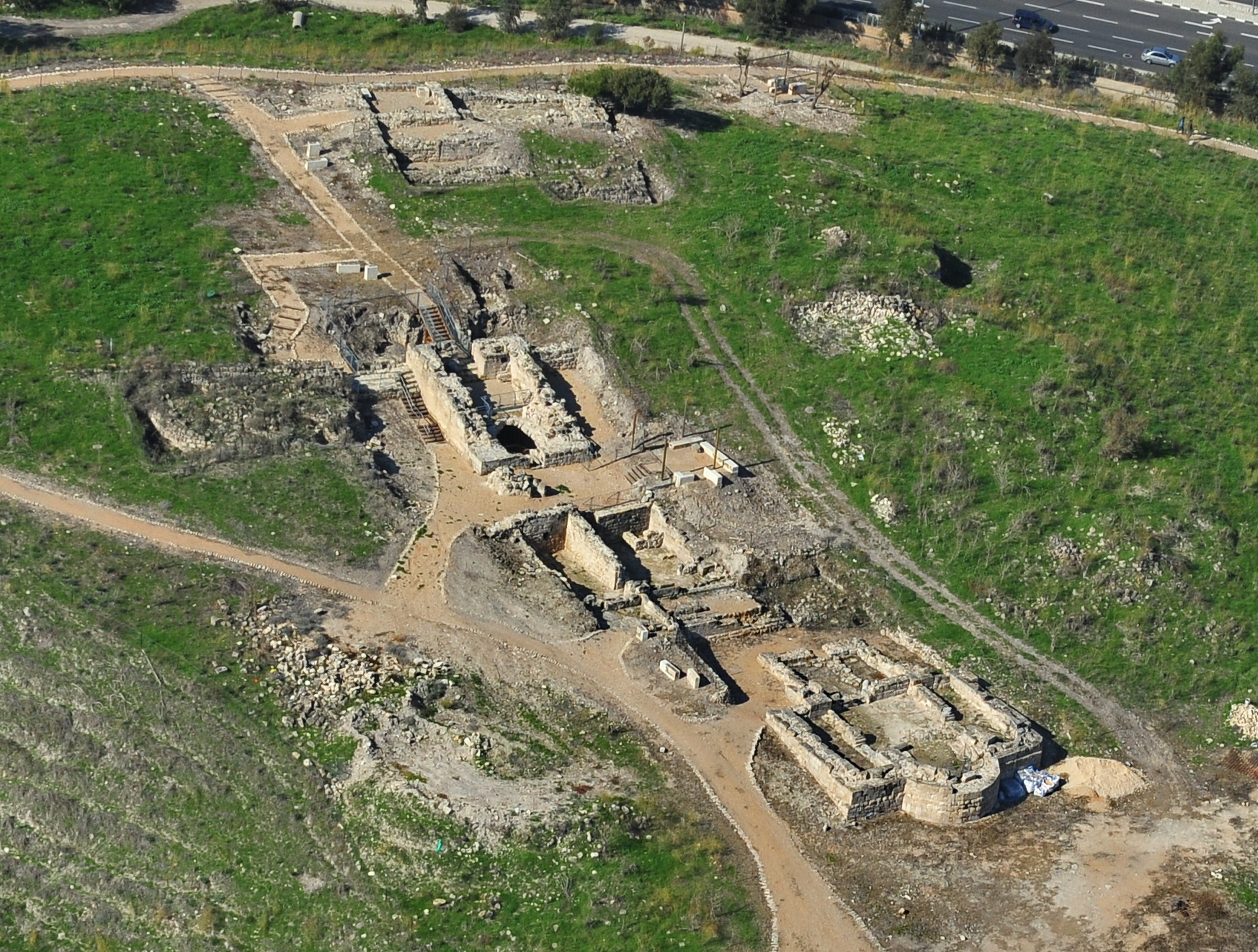
The Crusader acropolis and the fortress in the upper area (2011)

After the First Crusade, Yokneam was included in the newly established Frankish Kingdom of Jerusalem. It appears in Latin sources for the first time in a decree issued by Pope Paschal II. The decree stated that Yokneam, under the name Caimum, belonged to the monastery of Mount Tabor. It was possibly still in Muslim hands at that time, as was the case for most of the places listed. It is likely that King Baldwin I of Jerusalem took Yokneam during his campaign against Acre in 1104, and it is unclear whether the monastery of Mount Tabor had previously owned the land. Yokneam is mentioned again, as "Caymont", in a charter issued by King Baldwin IV of Jerusalem on 24 February 1182 granting a fief consisting of a few shops in Acre and 480 acres of land in the territory of Caymont ("territorio de Caimont") to Joscelin III. By that time, Caymont was probably a lordship. The territory did not exceed fifty square kilometers (19 mi^{2}). No other settlements on its lands are known today.

After Saladin defeated the armies of the Crusaders at the Battle of Hattin in 1187, the Frankish city of Caymont fell into the hands of the Islamic Ayyubid dynasty. The city was notable enough to be mentioned in the two detailed accounts recorded. One of these states that the site, along with others in the region, was plundered by the conquerors. Imad ad-Din al-Isfahani, Saladin's secretary, wrote that upon the fall of La Fève, Caymont surrendered like other Frankish localities. In January 1188, some of Saladin's men proposed destruction of the Crusaders' main coastal stronghold of Acre, to prevent the Crusaders from reconquering and re-establishing it. Caymont, known by the Muslims as "Qaymun", would be preserved and made the region's principal Muslim stronghold. Qaymun was considered a good choice because it was close enough to the sea, but far enough to thwart naval attacks. Ultimately, however, Saladin decided to fortify Acre instead.

During the Third Crusade, Qaymun was mentioned again when Saladin sent his property to Qaymun and Nazareth during the Siege of Acre. As soon as the Crusaders began their march towards Jaffa on 22 August 1191, Saladin began marching on a parallel inland course. He camped in Qaymun for one day, on 24 August 1191. That his army set up tents there suggests that the Frankish castle was already in ruins.

The Treaty of Jaffa, which ended the Third Crusade when it was signed on 2 September 1192, gave Qaymun and its lands to Balian of Ibelin, a prominent Frankish leader. Nothing is known of Balian's doings in Caymont, but as he was a prominent leader it is plausible that he made a significant contribution to the site. After the initial Crusader victory at Damietta, the Franks of Acre attempted to attack the Muslims, but were defeated near Caymont by the sultan of Damascus, Al-Mu'azzam Isa.

In a treaty signed during the Seventh Crusade, Caymont is listed among the castles that remained in Frankish hands. A lord of Caymont mentioned in 1253, Aymarri, is its last known lord.

In 1256, Pope Alexander IV gave the destroyed monastery of Tabor, which included Caymont, to the Knights Hospitaller. An ownership dispute between the Hospitallers and the Knights Templar was resolved in May 1262, the Templars winning the territory.

It is likely that Caymont was attacked by the Islamic Mamluk sultan Baibars sometime between 1263 and 1266. In 1283, the territory was in the possession of Al-Mansur Qalawun, the Mamluk sultan of Egypt and Syria.

==== Archaeological findings ====
There is a 100-year break in the archaeological record between the Early Islamic phase and Yokneam's Crusader period in the early 12th century.

The Crusader's city was fortified, and probably the largest settlement on the site since the Iron Age. Structures were found in all of the excavation areas. The fortification system featured a two-meter-wide (6.6 ft) rampart supported by a retaining wall, and a drainage system to protect it from the weather. A large building with a kitchen, and a big public building were identified beside the wall. Significant public structures in the south included the city gate, a fort, and a church. The fort occupies 15% of the entire available area of the mound. It was several stories high, with watchtowers at its corners. The castle is attributed to King Baldwin I of Jerusalem, who reigned between 1100 and 1118 CE. The church was built on top of the earlier Byzantine church. A crusader tower was found, with foundations on the hill's bedrock. The 18-by-22-meter (59 ft × 72 ft) tower connects with the city wall, and its ruins still stand 3 meters (9.8 ft) high. A residential complex was found between the church and the tower, with a courtyard featuring a tabun oven and public toilets.

The remains of a Mamluk settlement were found in the area of the church and beneath the Ottoman fortress. The Mamluks reused many elements of the early settlements. This is evident in the Mamluk pottery, found in assemblages as early as the Byzantine period. The Mamluks used the Crusader tower as a stable, and Mamluk ovens were found within the Crusader church. On the basis of the pottery found, it appears that Yokneam was under Mamluk occupation during the 14th century only.

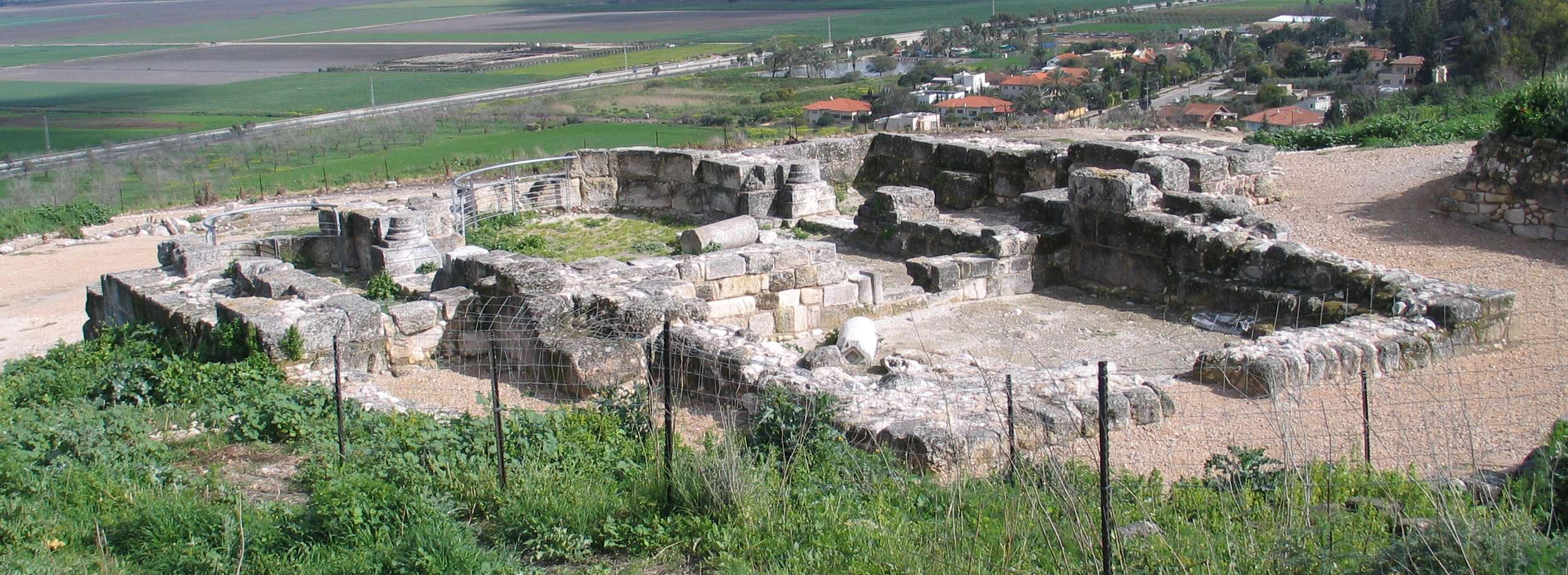
Ruins of the Crusader-era church at Tel Yokneam, built on the ruins of an earlier Byzantine church and reused under Mamluk rule

=== Ottoman period ===
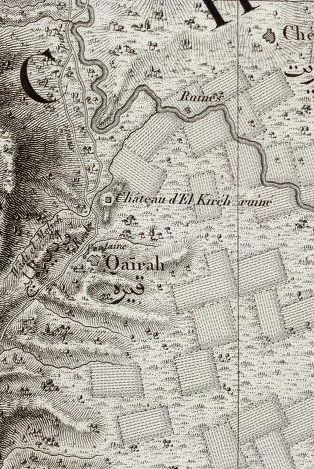
Part of Pierre Jacotin's map, showing Tel Yokneam as "Chateau d'El Kireh"

During the Ottoman–Mamluk War (1516–17), the Levant fell to the Ottoman Empire. Records from the 18th century state that Daher al-Umar, who ruled over Galilee in that century, built a fortress in Yokneam. Ottoman smoking pipes were found near the Crusader church, and Ottoman pottery, probably displaced by rainwater, was found in several areas of the tel. These finds are quite meager, however, and archaeologist Amnon Ben-Tor has challenged this claim. Miriam Avissar, another archaeologist who has studied the site, believes that the fortress is indeed an Ottoman fortress, built by Daher al-Umar in the 18th century and abandoned in the 19th century.

Pierre Jacotin recorded a castle at Yokneam on a map he made in 1799 during Napoleon Bonaparte's 1798–1801 French campaign in Egypt and Syria. The castle name is given as the Chateau d'El Kireh (Castle of Qira), probably deriving from the name of the nearby village of Qira.

Charles William Meredith van de Velde described the site in 1854, noting ruins that included the foundations of a Christian church, and several large vaulted caves. Of the area he said: "It is now quite a deserted region. Here are no more armies, no more townspeople or villages; a single herd of goats watched by a few wild Arabs, was all that we met."

Claude Reignier Conder described the site in 1878 as a "huge Tell" with the remains of a "little Byzantine chapel" and a "small fort" built by Daher al-Umar. He recounts two legends about this place: a Samaritan legend that Joshua camped here during the fight against the Canaanites; and a Christian legend that Lamech, the great-grandchild of Cain, murdered his own great grandfather here with an arrow. Conder understands the name "Cain Mons" (i.e.: Caymont) as a corruption of "Keimûn".

== History of archaeological excavation ==
Tel Yokneam was first surveyed in 1878 by Claude Reignier Conder of the Palestine Exploration Fund. It was later surveyed by Avner Raban, in the 1970s. In 1931, under the British Mandate, a group of prisoners tasked with removing stones from the mound discovered a diorite vessel from ancient Egypt.

The main excavations at Tel Yokneam took place as part of the "Yoqne'am Regional Project", conducted by the Institute of Archaeology of the Hebrew University of Jerusalem in collaboration with the Israel Exploration Society.

- 1977 Season: Headed by Amnon Ben-Tor (biblical period) and Renate Rosenthal (classical and later periods). Six areas (labeled A, B1, B2, C, D, and E) were opened. Four of these were on the lower terrace of the mound, aimed at finding the fortification system. Another two areas were dug on the upper terrace. The acropolis was not excavated. During this season, the Iron Age fortifications and the Crusader church were investigated.
- 1978 Season: Headed by Ben-Tor. Excavations focused on the northwestern slope of the mound, with the aim of investigating settlement layers from the medieval period down to the Iron Age. Four layers were identified, dated to the Mamluk, Crusader, Persian, and Iron Age phases. The western section of the church, which had remained covered during the previous season, was revealed.
- 1979 and 1981 Seasons: Headed by Ben-Tor. Work centered principally on the northwestern slope and the Iron Age fortifications.
- 1984, 1985, and 1987 Seasons: Headed by Ben-Tor and Yuval Portugali. The Iron and Bronze Age layers were studied during these seasons. Excavation of the Crusader church continued during the 1987 season, revealing the presence of an earlier Byzantine church beneath.
- 1988 Season: Headed by Ben-Tor. Excavations reached bedrock, identifying the site's earliest known traces, from the Chalcolithic and Early Bronze Age.

From July to October 1993, Miriam Avissar directed a dig on behalf of the Israel Antiquities Authority. Excavations uncovered the areas west of the church and the acropolis. Most of the structures found were dated to the period of the Crusades, buried under minor remains from the Ottoman and Mamluk periods.

In March 2014, Nurit Feig of the Israel Antiquities Authority conducted a salvage excavation at the southeastern foot of the mound, ahead of the residential expansion of Yokneam Moshava. The remains of Iron Age dwellings dating from the 10th to 8th centuries BCE were discovered, adding to the impression that the Iron Age was Yokneam's "golden age".

== Archaeological park ==
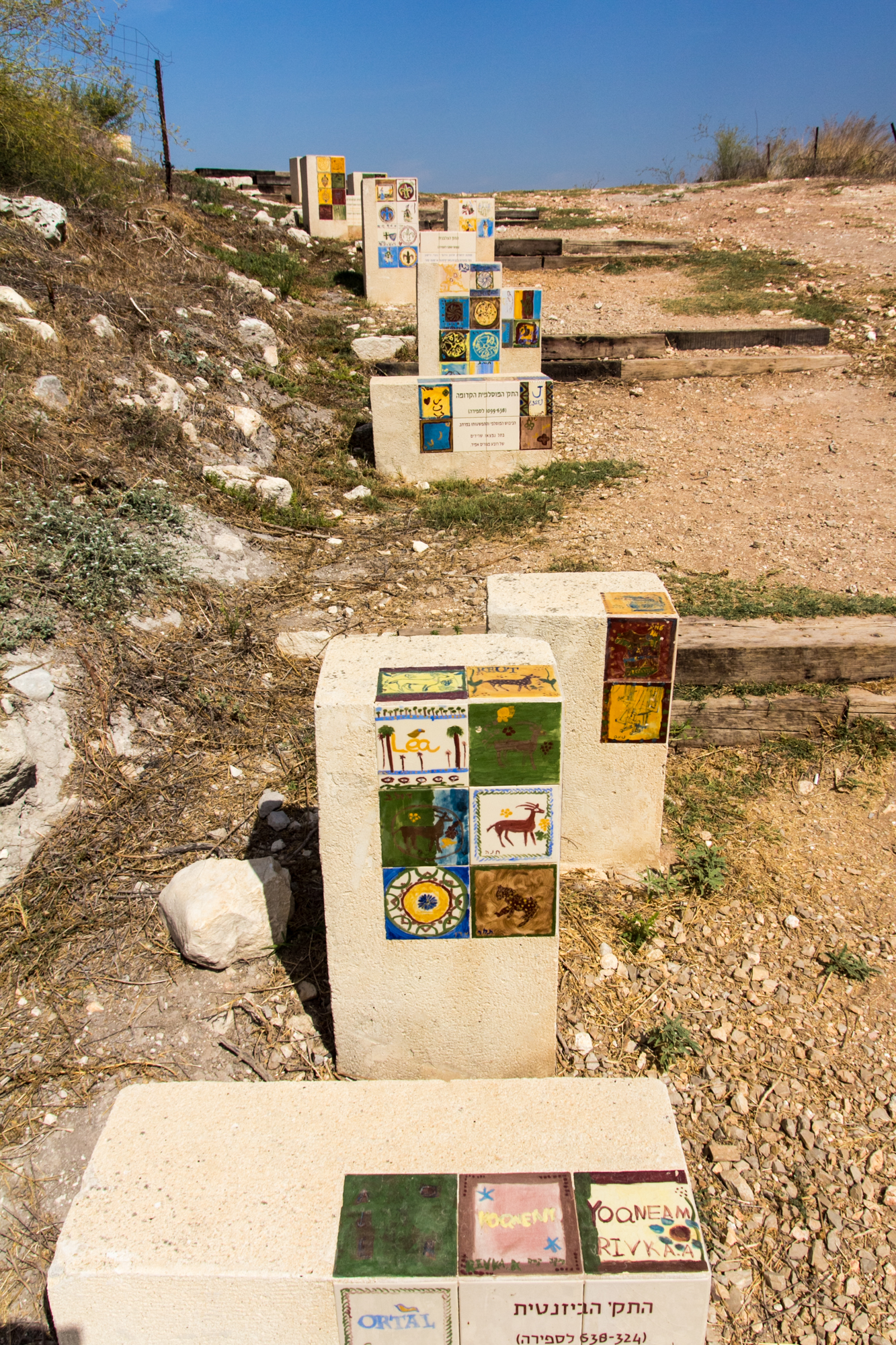
Ceramic blocks representing historical periods, decorated by Yokneam Illit students

Tel Yokneam today is an archaeological and educational park, jointly managed by the municipality of Yokneam Illit and the Israel Antiquities Authority (IAA).

The park was created between 2007 and 2010, as a tel conservation project by the municipality and the IAA for the city's residents. Yokneam Illit's elementary and high school students took part in the project. The project involved creating a paved path from the foot to the top of the mound, circling its peak. The students set up ceramic blocks, each decorated with drawings and pictures representing a different historical period. The blocks are arranged chronologically on the path, advancing through history as the path climbs towards the mound's peak. At the top of the mound are four thematic stations. The first includes a pit representing the archaeological strata of the tel. The other stations, respectively, provide information about Yokneam as a city inhabited by the Tribe of Levi; a model of the biblical city; and maps showing the site's relationship to the trade routes and other sites around it. Native oak trees were also planted at each station to provide shelter from the sun. In 2013, students reconstructed 30 meters (100 ft) of the Iron Age fortification system.

The park contains a visitor center with an exhibition of finds from Tel Yokneam. According to the center, the exhibition tells the story of ancient Yokneam from a historical, cultural, religious, and economic point of view. Among the finds displayed is a rare statue representing either the ruler or a noble of ancient Yokneam. The statue is dated to the 9th century BCE, the time of the northern Kingdom of Israel. It shows Phoenician influence, and is the only one of its kind found in Israel to date. Also exhibited is a ritual vessel from the nearby Tel Qashish, dating from the Late Bronze Age. The visitor center was opened during Passover, 2019. At the opening ceremony, the future development plan for the archaeological park was revealed.

== See also ==
- Archaeology of Israel

== Bibliography ==
- Amnon Ben-Tor, Miriam Avissar, Ruhama Bonfil, Anabel Zarzecki-Peleg, Yuval Portugali (1987). "A Regional Study of Tel Yoqneʿam and Its Vicinity / מחקר אזורי בתל יקנעם וסביבתו". Qadmoniot: A Journal for the Antiquities of Eretz-Israel and Bible Lands / קדמוניות: כתב-עת לעתיקות ארץ-ישראל וארצות המקרא. Vol 20, issue 1–2. pp. 2–17
- Amnon Ben-Tor, Doron Ben-Ami and Ariella Livneh (2005). "Yoqne'am III: The Middle And Late Bronze Ages—Final Report of the Archaeological Excavations (1977–1988)". Qedem Reports
- Amnon Ben-Tor, Anabel Zarzecki-Peleg, Shlomit Cohen- Anidjar (2005). "Yoqne'am II: The Iron Age and the Persian Period – Final Report of the Archaeological Excavations (1977–1988)". Qedem Reports.
  - Manuel Cimadevilla, "Part IV: The Persian Period" (pp. 400–421)
- Amnon Ben-Tor, Yuval Portugali, Miriam Avissar (1996). "Yoqne'am I: The Late Periods". Qedem Reports
  - Kedar, Benjamin Z., "Chapter Two: The Frankish Period: 'Cain's Mountain" (pp. 3–8).
  - Yuval Portugali, "Chapter Nine: The City Plan of Yoqne'am in the Crusader Period" (p. 47)
- Amnon Ben-Tor, Anabel Zarzecki-Peleg, Ruhama Bonfíl, Hannah Greenbern, Rafi Burnik, Yoqne'am Regional Project – 1984–1987, Hadashot Arkheologiyot 90, 1987, pp. 18–24 (Hebrew)
- Conder, C. R. (1878). Tent work in Palestine. A record of discovery and adventure Vol. 1. London: R. Bentley & Son. pp. 130–131. Archived from the original on 2016-04-03.
- Conder, C .R.; Kitchener, H.H. (1882). The Survey of Western Palestine: Memoirs of the Topography, Orography, Hydrography, and Archaeology. Vol. 2. London: Committee of the Palestine Exploration Fund.
- Fetellus (1896). Fetellus (circa 1130 A.D). Palestine Pilgrims' Text Society.
- Guérin, V. (1875). Description Géographique Historique et Archéologique de la Palestine (in French). Vol. 2: Samarie, pt. 2. Paris: L'Imprimerie Nationale. (pp. 241–244 )
- Le Strange, G. (1890). Palestine Under the Moslems: A Description of Syria and the Holy Land from A.D. 650 to 1500. London: Committee of the Palestine Exploration Fund. (p. 473)
- Pringle, D. (1998). The Churches of the Crusader Kingdom of Jerusalem: L-Z (exluding Tyre). Vol. II. Cambridge University Press. ISBN 0 521 39037 0.
- Robinson, E. (1856). Later Biblical Researches in Palestine, and in the Adjacent Regions. Harvard University.
- Runciman, S. (1987). A history of the crusades. Vol. 3. Cambridge University Press. ISBN 978-0521347723.
- Schwarz, Joseph (1850). A descriptive geography and brief historical sketch of Palestine. Oxford University.
- Velde, van de, C.W.M. (1854). Narrative of a journey through Syria and Palestine in 1851 and 1852. Vol. 1. William Blackwood and son.
