= Israel Exploration Society =

Research society

- החברה לחקירת ארץ ישראל ועתיקותיה
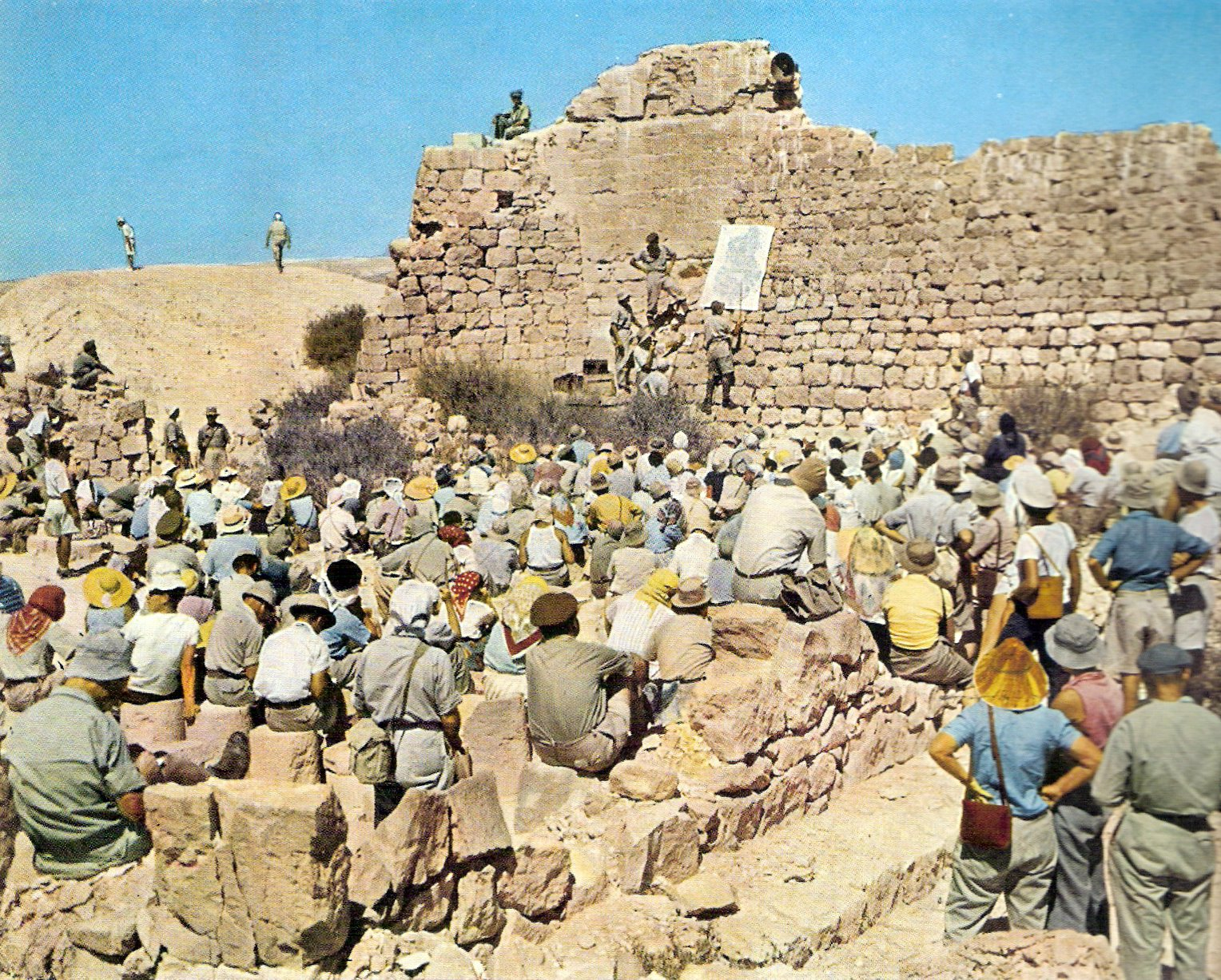
- Israel Exploration Society meeting at Shivta, Israel, 1950s
- Formation: 1913
- Founder: David Yellin
- Founded at: (Ottoman Empire) Ottoman Palestine
- Type: Non-profit organization
- Headquarters: Jerusalem, Israel
- Main organ: Executive Committee
- Website: israelexplorationsociety.huji.ac.il
- Formerly called: Jewish Palestine Exploration Society

The Israel Exploration Society (IES; Hebrew: החברה לחקירת ארץ ישראל ועתיקותיה; Hakhevra Lekhakirat Eretz Yisrael Va'atikoteha), originally the Jewish Palestine Exploration Society, is a society devoted to historical, geographical and archaeological research of the Land of Israel. The society was founded in 1913 and again in 1920, with the object of studying the history and civilization of the Land of Israel and of disseminating its knowledge.

== Overview ==
The Israel Exploration Society plays a key role in archaeological research covering all periods, from prehistoric times to the Ottoman period. It coordinates much of the multi-institutional archaeological research carried out by both Israeli and foreign archaeological expeditions in Israel. Major activities undertaken by the IES include organizing excavations, enlisting financial support for archaeological projects, publishing excavation reports and liaison and cooperation with Israeli and foreign institutions in the field of publication and in a collective effort to promote the cause of archaeology.

The IES is a non-profit organization governed by an executive committee and a Council comprising representatives from all of the institutes of archaeology in the Israel and several major archaeological museums.

== History ==
The society was founded in April 1913, with David Yellin as president and A. Brawer as secretary. It was called "The Jewish Society for the Exploration of Eretz-Israel and its Antiquities" in Hebrew and the "Jewish Palestine Exploration Society" in English. Due to the advent of WWI and other reasons, the society folded without conducting any excavations or publishing any reports. In November 1920, the same group of people founded the society again, changing "Jewish" to "Hebrew" in its Hebrew name but keeping the English name.

During the period of the British Mandate, the society was responsible for the first archaeological excavations ever conducted by a Jewish organization in Palestine, at Hamat Tiberias, where Nahum Slouschz discovered a Late Roman to Byzantine-period synagogue. Other digs were carried out at Absalom's Tomb, around Jerusalem's Old City walls, Ramat Rachel, Beit She'arim and Tel Bet Yerah.

Following the 1948 Arab-Israeli War, the IES received the first excavation permit issued by the Israeli government allowing it to excavate at Tell Qasile. Since then, the IES has organised and sponsored some of the most important archaeological projects carried out in the country including Tel Hazor, Masada, the excavations in Jerusalem near the Temple Mount, in the Jewish Quarter, and at the City of David, the Judean Desert Expeditions, En-Gedi, Tel Arad, Lachish, Aphek, Jericho, Herodium, Yoqneam, Dor and Tel Megiddo.

IES is a public organization whose work consists of the organization and sponsoring of archaeological projects, publication of periodicals and excavation reports, and the running of professional conferences.

== Conferences and publications ==
=== Annual meetings ===
The IES, in cooperation with other institutions, has held thirty annual meetings for the professional archaeological community in Israel.

Fifty-nine archaeological conferences have been held for members of the IES. These annual gatherings include lectures by archaeologists and guided tours of recently discovered sites.

=== Congresses, published proceedings ===
- Biblical archaeology: two international congresses on were held on the topic in 1984 and 1990, attracting hundreds of participants from around the world. The proceedings of both have been published in two volumes entitled Biblical Archaeology Today.
- Dead Sea Scrolls: in 1997, an international congress was held in Jerusalem marking 50 years since the discovery of the DSS. The proceedings appear in the volume The Dead Sea Scrolls Fifty Years after their Discovery.

=== Book publications (selection) ===
- The Ancient Pottery of Israel and Its Neighbors from the Neolithic through the Hellenistic Period (3 vols., 2015, ed. Seymour Gitin), prepared together with the Israel Antiquities Authority (IAA), the Albright Institute and the American Schools of Oriental Research (ASOR)
- The New Encyclopedia of Archaeological Excavations in the Holy Land (1993), appeared in four-volume Hebrew and English editions

=== Periodicals and series ===
- Qobez was a Hebrew periodical published first in 1921.
- Israel Exploration Journal (English, semi-annual)
- Qadmoniot: A Journal for the Antiquities of Eretz-Israel and Bible (Hebrew quarterly), published by IES together with the Israel Antiquities Authority (IAA). Initiated in 1968 by Yigael Yadin and Joseph Aviram as a Hebrew-language popular journal of archaeology and ancient history of the Land of Israel, it had Yadin as chief editor until 1978, when Ephraim Stern took over (1978–1994, 1998–2018). As of 2018, it was considered to be the main Hebrew-language archaeological journal.
- Eretz-Israel: Archaeological, Historical and Geographical Studies (Hebrew and English), festschrift series publishing original studies in honor of leading international scholars. Twenty-seven volumes have appeared to date.
- The Bulletin:
  - 1962-1967: Yediot Bahaqirat Eretz-Israel Weatiqoteha / ידיעות בחקירת ארץ-ישראל ועתיקותיה, lit. "In the investigation of the Land of Israel and its antiquities"
  - 1952–1961: Bulletin of the Israel Exploration Society / ידיעות החברה לחקירת ארץ-ישראל ועתיקותיה, lit. "News from the Society for the Exploration of Israel and its Antiquities"
  - 1933–1951: Bulletin of the Jewish Palestine Exploration Society / ידיעות החברה העברית לחקירת ארץ-ישראל ועתיקותיה, lit. "News from the Hebrew Society for the Exploration of Israel and its Antiquities"

== Awards ==
In 1989, the Israel Exploration Society was awarded the Israel Prize for its special contribution to society and the State of Israel. The citation of the judges’ committee notes: "It has been the principal and most effective institution for furthering knowledge of the archaeology and history of the country both at home and abroad since it was founded seventy-five years ago."

== See also ==
- Archaeology of Israel
- List of Israel Prize recipients
