= Battle of Mishmar HaEmek =

1948 battle of the 1947–1949 Palestine War

- Part of the 1947–1948 civil war in Mandatory Palestine
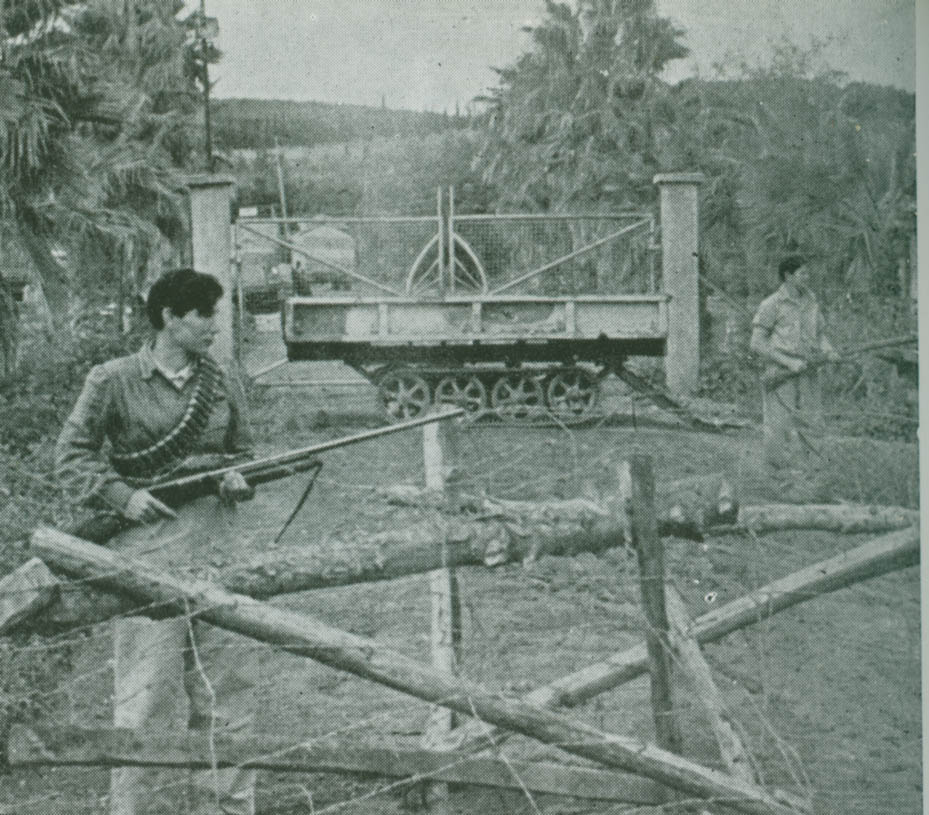
- Jewish soldiers at the entry of the Mishmar Ha'emek, 1948
Date	4–15 April 1948
Location	Mishmar HaEmek, Mandatory Palestine 32°36′35″N 35°8′30″E
Result	Yishuv victory
Territorial changes	Surrounding villages captured

Belligerents
Yishuv; Haganah	Arab Higher Committee; Arab Liberation Army

Commanders and leaders
Yitzhak Sadeh	Fawzi al-Qawuqji

Strength
~470 militiamen	1,000 militiamen
- Location within Mandatory Palestine

The Battle of Mishmar HaEmek was part of the civil war in Mandatory Palestine ahead of the 1948 Arab–Israeli War. It was a ten-day battle fought from 4 to 15 April 1948 between the Arab Liberation Army (Yarmouk Battalion) commanded by Fawzi al-Qawuqji and the Haganah (Palmach and HISH) commanded by Yitzhak Sadeh and Dan Laner. The battle began when al-Qawuqji launched an attack against Mishmar HaEmek with the intent of taking the kibbutz, which was strategically placed beside the main road between Jenin and Haifa. In 1947 it had a population of 550.

== Battle ==
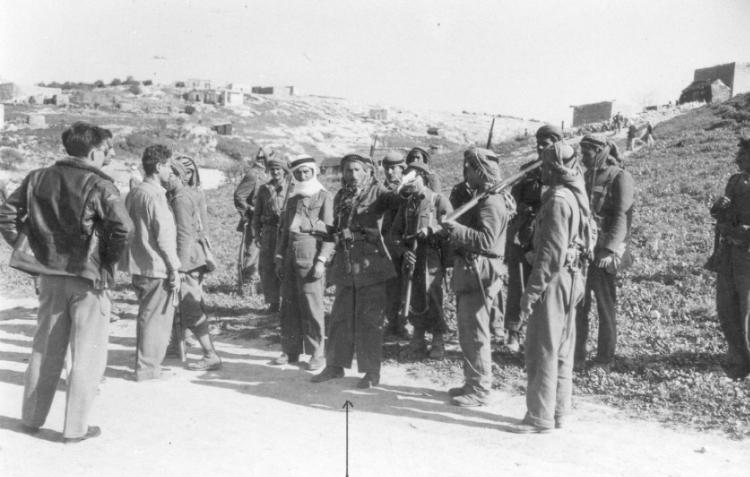
Bay Mahdi, one of the ALA commanders, during the attack on Mishmar HaEmek, 1948

On 4 April 1948, about 1,000 Arab Liberation Army (ALA) militiamen launched an attack on the kibbutz. They were initially opposed by 170 Jews and later, two companies of the Palmach, "less than 300 boys." The attack began with an artillery barrage from seven artillery pieces supplied by the Syrian Army, killing a young woman and her 11-month old baby at the nursery. This was the first time that artillery was used in the war. For five days, the Arab force shelled the village from a distance of 800 yards, killing and injuring several civilians including students at the kibbutz's high school. The Jews had one machine gun and "not enough rifles for all the male settlers," Following the shelling, an infantry attack was launched, but it was "stopped in its tracks along the fence of the village by defenders' fire." That night a company from the Haganah's Golani Brigade "infiltrated into the village" to assist the Haganah militia who had repelled the attack. Mishmar HaEmek was shelled again all day on 5 April and Jewish reinforcements arrived during the following night. At the same time the 1st battalion of the Palmach began assembling at Ein Hashofet 3 miles (4.8 km) to the west. Qawuqji also brought reinforcements from Jenin.

On 7 April, a British unit suggested a ceasefire and the ALA "agreed to cease the attack" for 24 hours and "called on the kibbutz to surrender its weapons and submit to Arab rule". During this 24-hour period, the kibbutz was able to evacuate its women and children. The ceasefire was rejected by David Ben-Gurion and the Haganah General Staff, who decided instead to launch a counter-attack "to clear the ALA and the local Arab inhabitants out of the area, and to level the villages in order to permanently remove the threat to Mishmar Ha'emek," and to make it more difficult for an invading force from Jenin to push through to Haifa. Benny Morris originally wrote in 1987 that, "It began as a desperate Jewish defence and turned into a Haganah offensive conforming to Plan Dalet guidelines." Writing later in 2008, he instead said, the "Haganah victories and the wholesale flight of Arab communities ... retrospectively, were seen as stages in the implementation of Plan D[alet]."

=== The Jewish counter-offensive ===
Ghubayya al-Tahta, Mishmar HaEmek's closest neighbour to the south, Ghubayya al-Fauqa and Khirbet Beit Ras were captured on 8/9 April. Ghubayya al-Tahta was blown up immediately, the other two were blown up "piecemeal in the following days". Most of the residents fled before or during the attacks. According to Qawuqji's memoirs, a "pitched battle" took place around these villages with "house to house fighting". According to Morris, the ALA units "often retreated first, abandoning the villagers." On 10 April Haganah units took Abu Shusha, a few hundred yards north of the kibbutz, expelling the remaining villagers and destroying the village that night. On 12 April Palmach soldiers took Al-Kafrayn and Abu Zurayq, found no-one in the first village but took "fifteen adult males and some 200 women and children" captive in the second. The women and children were expelled. 30 houses in Al-Kafrayn were blown up that day and some at Abu Zurayq that night. Abu Zurayq was completely destroyed by 15 April. On 12 April, al-Qawuqji and his troops were almost encircled and they had to withdraw in haste to Jenin. During the night of 12–13 April Palmach units took the villages of Al-Mansi and Naghnaghiya which were blown up in the following days. On 19 April Al-Kafrayn was used by a Palmach unit for training and then "blown up completely." According to Benny Morris, "Most of the villagers reached the Jenin area and sheltered in makeshift tents."

A Jewish Iraqi volunteer, Abdullah Dawud, fought on the Arab side as a sniper and later, after hiding his participation in the battle emigrated to Israel in 1950, a move he reportedly regretted all his life. A month later, on 12 May, the Lehi launched an operation which cleared five villages west of Mishmar HaEmek.

== Aftermath ==
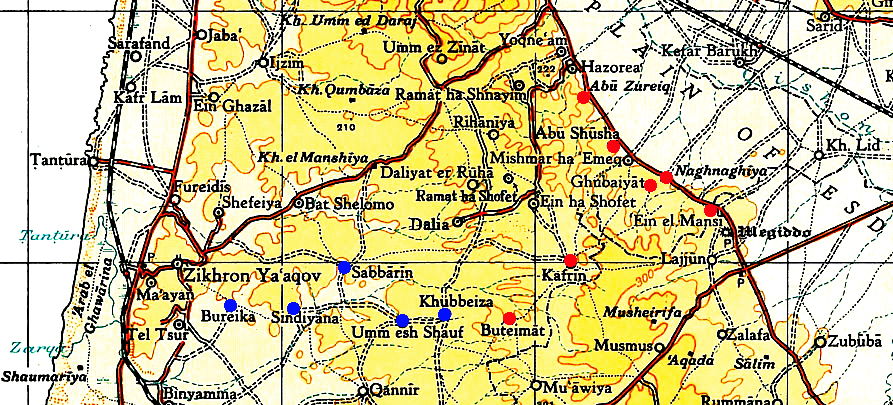
Villages cleared in Haganah counter-attack (red). Those captured on 12 May by Irgun marked by blue spots.

All of the Palestinian villages captured were destroyed shortly thereafter. Members of the left wing Mapam, to which Mishmar HaEmek was affiliated, were accused of hypocrisy in following months when they complained about the destruction of Arab villages, because it was said that in this case it was what they had called for. A delegation had told David Ben-Gurion they were not sure the kibbutz could hold out otherwise. Still, it "left a bitter taste in the mouths of some kibbutzniks." On 14 April the Middle East scholar and member of Mapam, Eliezer Bauer (Be'eri), wrote in a letter partially quoted by Morris:

Of course in a cruel war such as we are engaged in, one cannot act with kid gloves. But there are still rules in war which a civilized people tries to follow... [Bauer focused on events in Abu Zureiq a day or two earlier.] When the village was conquered, the villagers tried to escape and save themselves by fleeing to the fields of the [Jezreel] Valley. Forces from nearby settlements sortied out and outflanked them. There were exchanges of fire in which several of these Arabs were killed. Others surrendered or were captured unarmed. Most were killed [i.e., murdered]. And these were not gang members as was later written in [the Mapam daily] Al Hamishmar but defenceless, beaten peasants. Only members of my kibbutz [Hazore'a] took prisoners... Also in the village, when adult males were discovered hiding hours after the end of battle -they were killed... It is said that there were also cases of rape, but it is possible that this is one of those made-up tales of 'heroism' that soldiers are prone to. ... Of the property in the houses and farm animals left without minders, they took what they could: One took a kettle for coffee, another a horse, a third a cow...One may understand and justify, if they took cows from the village for Mishmar Ha'emek for example, or if soldiers who conquered the village would slaughter and fry chickens for themselves. But if every farmer from a nearby moshav [the allusion is to Yoqne'am] takes part in looting, that is nothing but theft..."

In early August, "The Committee for the Cultivation of Abandoned Lands" began the leasing of village land to Jewish settlements "for periods of six months to a year."

Almost all forces available to the ALA took part in the attack on Mishmar HaEmek; it was their "final significant contribution" in the conflict. Glubb Pasha, commander of the Transjordanian Arab Legion, described the ALA attack as a "fiasco" and wrote that after their defeat the ALA's "morale and enthusiasm waned (and) the Liberation Army became more interested in looting—often from the Arabs of Palestine".

== Bibliography ==
- Collins, L., & Lapierre, D. (1972). O Jerusalem! New York: Simon and Schuster.
- Ezov, Amiram (2016). "Arab army vs. a Jewish kibbutz: the battle for Mishmar Ha'emek, April 1948". Israel Affairs. 22 (1): 96–125. doi:10.1080/13537121.2015.1111633. ISSN 1353-7121.
- Herzog, C., & Gazit, S. (2005). The Arab-Israeli wars: War and peace in the Middle East from the 1948 War of Independence to the present. New York: Vintage Books.
- Jewish National Fund (1949). Jewish Villages in Israel. Jerusalem: Hamadpis Liphshitz Press.
- Kimche, J. (1950). Seven fallen pillars. The Middle East: 1915-1950, by Jon Kimche. London: Secker and Warburg.
- Kimche, J., & Kimche, D. (1960A). A clash of destinies: The Arab-Jewish War and the founding of the State of Israel. New York: Praeger.
- Kimche, J., & Kimche, D. (1960B). Both Sides of the Hill: Britain and the Palestine War. Secker and Warburg: London.
- Morris, B. (1987). The birth of the Palestinian refugee problem, 1947-1949. Cambridge [Cambridgeshire: Cambridge University Press.]
- Morris, B. (2004). The birth of the Palestinian refugee problem revisited. Cambridge: Cambridge University Press.
- Glubb, J. B. (1957). A soldier with the Arabs. London: Hodder and Stoughton.
- Shamai, Michal (June 2012). "Life narratives of adults who experienced war during childhood: The case of the attack and bombing of Kibbutz Mishmar-Haemek in 1948". Traumatology. 18 (2): 35–49. doi:10.1177/1534765611426790. ISSN 1085-9373.
