= Yokneam =

Yokneam or Jokneam can refer to:

- Yokneam Illit, city in northern Israel
- Yokneam Moshava, rural settlement in northern Israel
- Tel Yokneam, archeological site associated with the biblical city of Yokneam
