= Qira, Haifa =

Qira قِيرة
- Village
- Etymology: Kh. Kîreh, the ruin of pitch
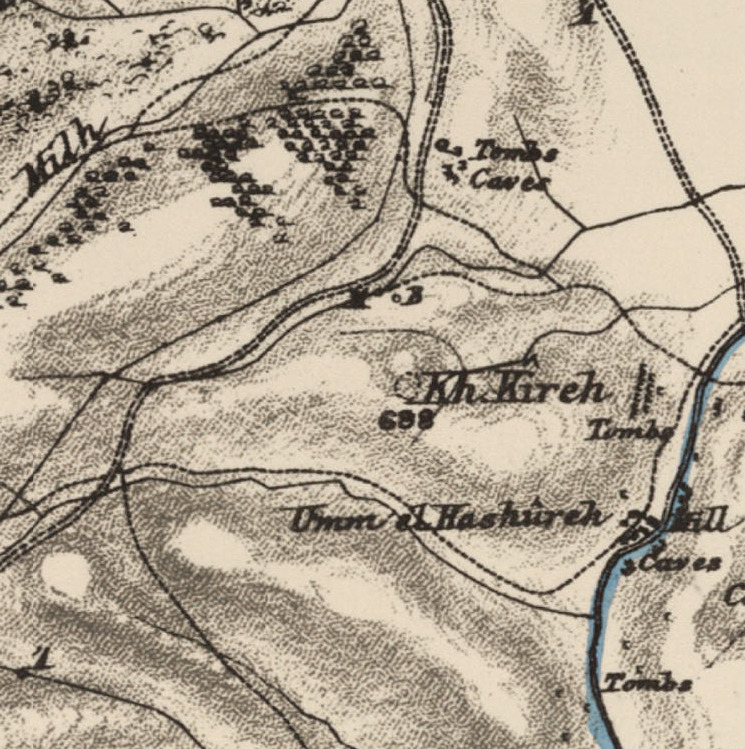
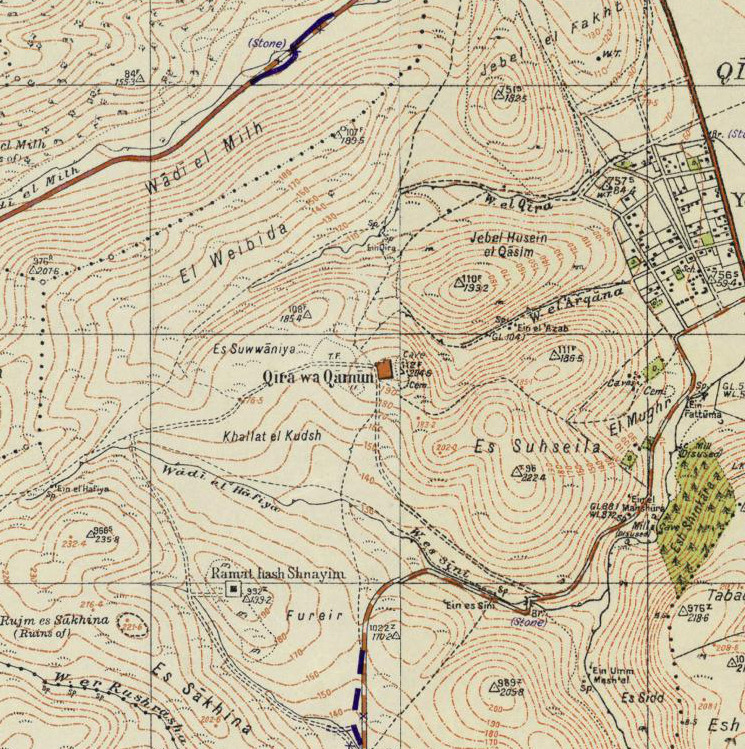
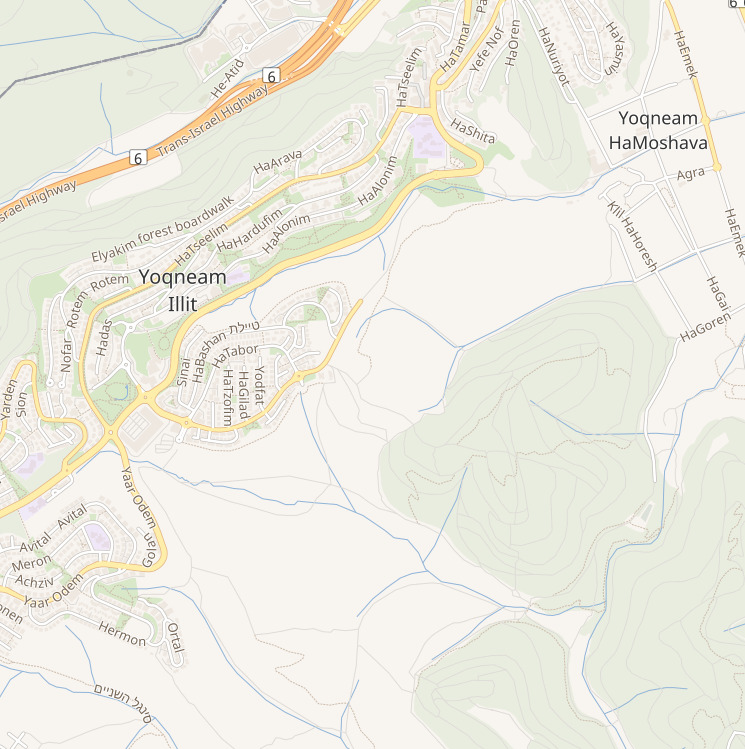
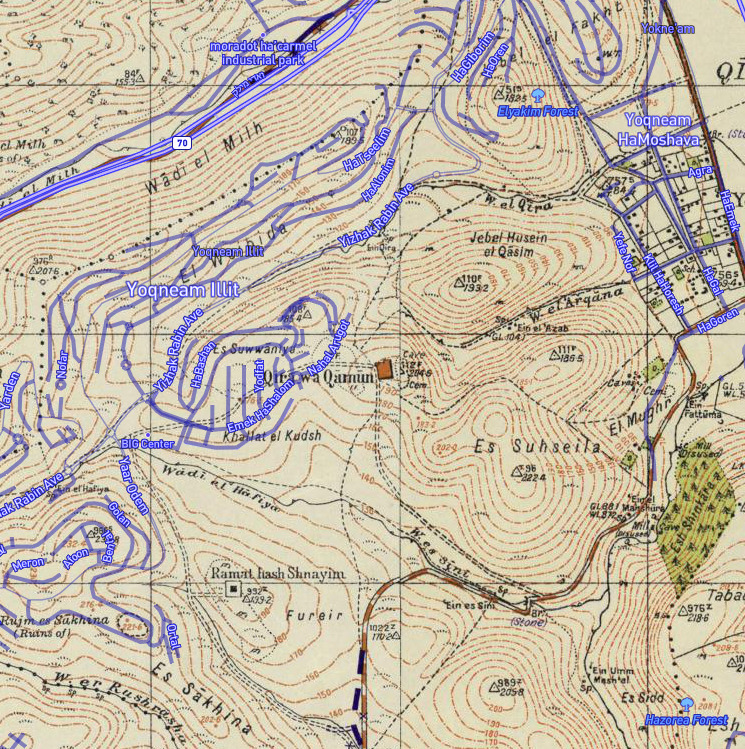
- 1870s map 1940s map modern map 1940s with modern overlay map A series of historical maps of the area around Qira, Haifa (click the buttons)

- Location within Mandatory Palestine
- Coordinates: 32°38′42″N 35°06′09″E
- Palestine grid: 159/227
- Geopolitical entity: Mandatory Palestine
- Subdistrict: Haifa
- Date of depopulation: late March 1948

Area
  - Total: 14,062 dunams (14.062 km^{2}; 5.429 sq mi)

Population (1945)
  - Total: 410
- Cause(s) of depopulation: Whispering campaign
- Current Localities: Yokneam Moshava, Yokneam Illit, HaZore'a

Qira (Arabic: قِيرة) was a Palestinian Arab village, located 23 kilometers southeast of Haifa. It was locally referred to as Qira wa Qamun.

Its people were Arab tenants, some of whom from the Bedouin tribes of Ka'abiye and Sa'adih. They settled the land during the late 19th century. The land of the village was owned by three Christian families from Beirut and Haifa. The land was purchased by the Yishuv in the 1920s and the villagers were gradually expelled. Yokneam Moshava and HaZore'a were built on former village land.

The occupation of Qira by pre-state Israeli forces on 1 March 1948 finished the expulsion process.

== History ==
At least 19 archaeological sites were located within the village's territory, the most renowned of these being Tell Qira and Tell Qamun.

=== Ottoman period ===
In a map made by Pierre Jacotin during the French campaign in Egypt and Syria, Tell Qamun appeared under the name of Chateau d'El Kireh (Castle of Qira), and Qira appeared as Qairah. In his visit to Qamun and Qira, van de Velde found a church on Qamun, and then he searched for a castle in Qira, but when he arrived to the site, he only found ruins "which externally presented nothing of importance". He came to the conclusion Jacotine confounded the tell of Qamun with that of Qira.

In 1872 the Ottoman government sold the lands of Qira to the Christian Sursock family from Beirut (modern-day Lebanon) and later their part of the land was shared with the Tueni family, also from Beirut. In that year the PEF's Survey of Western Palestine visited, and noted about Khurbet Kireh "Evidently an ancient site. There are traces of ruins and broken pottery on the hill; to the north are kokim tombs, caves, and a quarry; to the east are other tombs, caves, quarries, and a rock-cut water channel, Umm el Hashurah. There is a good supply of water in the valley at this point, and a small mill. A colony of Turcomans live in the caves; they pronounce the name Jireh." The other part of the land was sold to the Khouri family from Haifa. According to Peretz Levinger's study of the establishment of the nearby town of Yokneam Moshava, it is unknown if the villagers came before or after the land was sold to the families. He assumes the Ottomans sold the land when it was uninhabited.

The Palestinian community in Qira began during the 19th century. The residents were tenant farmers, paying fees to the families who owned the land. The population was made of two groups: Arab fellaheen, who came from the nearby Arab villages, and Bedouin nomads. The bedouins came from two tribes: Ka'abiye and Sa'adih, who arrived to the land, according to elderly traditions during the 1870s and possibly in the 1860s. At the time they arrived, they consisted of only twelve families.

A population list from about 1887 showed that Kireh had about 65 inhabitants; all Muslims.

=== British Mandate period ===
The area was acquired by the Jewish community as part of the Sursock Purchase. In 1924, Zionist activist Yehoshua Hankin bought the share of the land owned by the Sursock and Tueni families. In February 1934 the remaining share, owned by the Khouri family was bought after a decade of negotiations.

The fellaheen were the first to evacuate their lands after receiving compensation and thus the population Qira decreased from 134 in 1922 to 86 in 1931 (in a total of 21 houses). The evacuation of the Bedouin tribes took much longer as they refused to leave their lands, especially after the fellaheen left the better parts of the territory, suitable for the Bedouin lifestyle. It was also delayed because the Arab landowners did not want to take responsibility for the evacuation, due to political reasons. In their lands they grew wheat, barley and sorghum.

Further negotiations in 1935 and 1936, including the intervention of influential Arab figures were interrupted by the break of the 1936–1939 Arab revolt. The act of selling lands to Jews was seen in the Arab community as treason, punishable by death. After the revolt, both tribes showed interest in the renewal of the negotiations after their leaders no longer felt a threat to their lives. The evacuation continued in 1936 and later that year the rest of the Ka'abiye tribe left. The last evacuation took place in 1945 when the leader of the Sa'adih tribe left for a large amount of money. The last of Qira's Muslim population lived between Yokneam Moshava and HaZore'a.

=== 1948 and aftermath ===
According to Ilan Pappe in The Israel/Palestine Question (1999), the 140 tenant farmers of Qira wa Qamun evacuated the village in March on the "friendly advice" of the local Haganah intelligence officer at Yokneam, Yehuda Burstein. Benny Morris notes that Burnstein received the orders for the evacuation from Yosef Weitz. The Haganah Intelligence Report attributes the flight to "fear and the influence of attacks in the area," which Morris notes is "not really the same thing." Subsequent to the depopulation of the village, Weitz and his colleagues from the Jewish National Fund in the North, "decided to raze the tenants' houses, to destroy their crops, and to pay the evictees compensation."

Qira wa Qamun's inhabitants joined the first wave of the 1948 Palestinian expulsion and flight, displaced prior to the outbreak of the 1948 Arab-Israeli war. Today, the villagers and their descendants remain refugees. Following the war the area was incorporated into the State of Israel; Yokneam Illit was later established on the former lands of Qira.

== See also ==
- Vassals of the Kingdom of Jerusalem

== Bibliography ==
- Barron, J.B., ed. (1923). Palestine: Report and General Abstracts of the Census of 1922. Government of Palestine.
- Conder, C.R. (1878). Tent work in Palestine. A record of discovery and adventure Vol. 1. London R. Bentley & Son.
- Conder, C.R.; Kitchener, H.H. (1882). The Survey of Western Palestine: Memoirs of the Topography, Orography, Hydrography, and Archaeology. Vol. 2. London: Committee of the Palestine Exploration Fund.
- Government of Palestine, Department of Statistics (1945). Village Statistics, April, 1945.
- Hadawi, S. (1970). Village Statistics of 1945: A Classification of Land and Area ownership in Palestine. Palestine Liberation Organization Research Center.
- Hanauer, J.E. (2002). Folklore of the Holy Land: Moslem, Christian and Jewish. Courier Dover. ISBN 0-486-42493-6.
- Khalidi, W. (1992). All That Remains: The Palestinian Villages Occupied and Depopulated by Israel in 1948. Washington D.C.: Institute for Palestine Studies. ISBN 0-88728-224-5.
- Karmon, Y. (1960). "An Analysis of Jacotin's Map of Palestine" (PDF). Israel Exploration Journal. 10 (3, 4): 155–173, 244–253. Archived from the original (PDF) on 2019-12-22.
- Levinger, Perez (1987). Land purchase in Yokenam area affair Archived 2016-03-03 at the Wayback Machine (פרשת רכישת הקרקעות באזור יקנעם) (Catedra, p. 153 - 170)
- Le Strange, G. (1890). Palestine Under the Moslems: A Description of Syria and the Holy Land from A.D. 650 to 1500. London: Committee of the Palestine Exploration Fund. OCLC 1004386.
- Mills, E., ed. (1932). Census of Palestine 1931. Population of Villages, Towns and Administrative Areas. Jerusalem: Government of Palestine.
- Morris, B. (2004). The Birth of the Palestinian Refugee Problem Revisited. Cambridge University Press. ISBN 978-0-521-00967-6.
- Palmer, E.H. (1881). The Survey of Western Palestine: Arabic and English Name Lists Collected During the Survey by Lieutenants Conder and Kitchener, R. E. Transliterated and Explained by E.H. Palmer. Committee of the Palestine Exploration Fund.
- Pappe, I. (1999). The Israel/Palestine Question. Routledge. ISBN 978-0-415-16947-9.
- Petersen, Andrew (2001). A Gazetteer of Buildings in Muslim Palestine (British Academy Monographs in Archaeology). Vol. I. Oxford University Press. p. 254. ISBN 978-0-19-727011-0. Archived from the original on 2021-05-28.
- Robinson, E. (1856). Later Biblical Researches in Palestine, and in the Adjacent Regions. Harvard University.
- Runciman, S. (1987). A history of the crusades. Vol. 3. Cambridge University Press. ISBN 0521347726.
- Schumacher, G. (1888). "Population list of the Liwa of Akka". Quarterly Statement - Palestine Exploration Fund. 20: 169–191.
- Schwarz, Joseph; Schwarz, Leeser (1850). A descriptive geography and brief historical sketch of Palestine. Oxford University.
- Velde, van de, C.W.M. (1854). Narrative of a journey through Syria and Palestine in 1851 and 1852. Vol. 1. William Blackwood and son.
