= Naghnaghiya =

Naghnaghiya النغْنغية Al-Naghnaghiyya
- Village
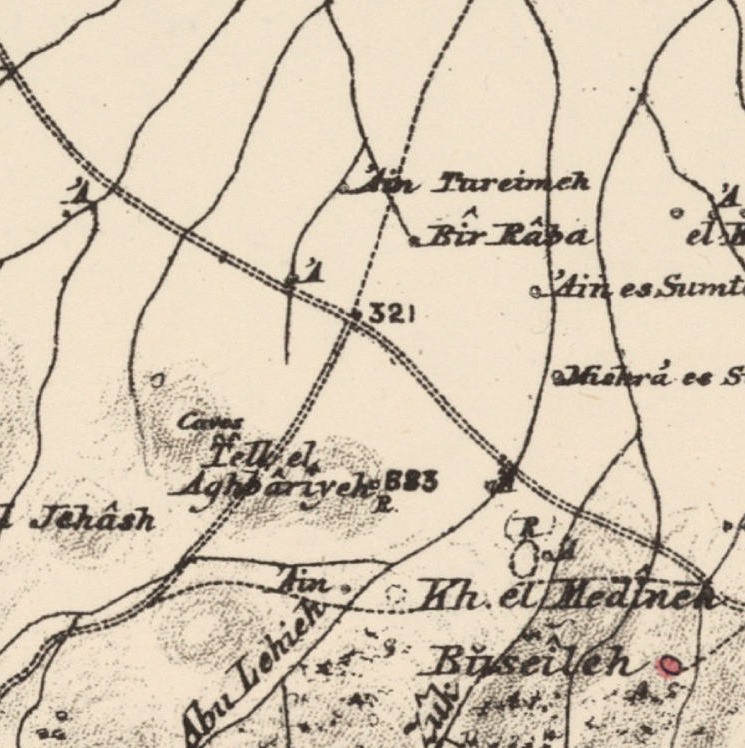
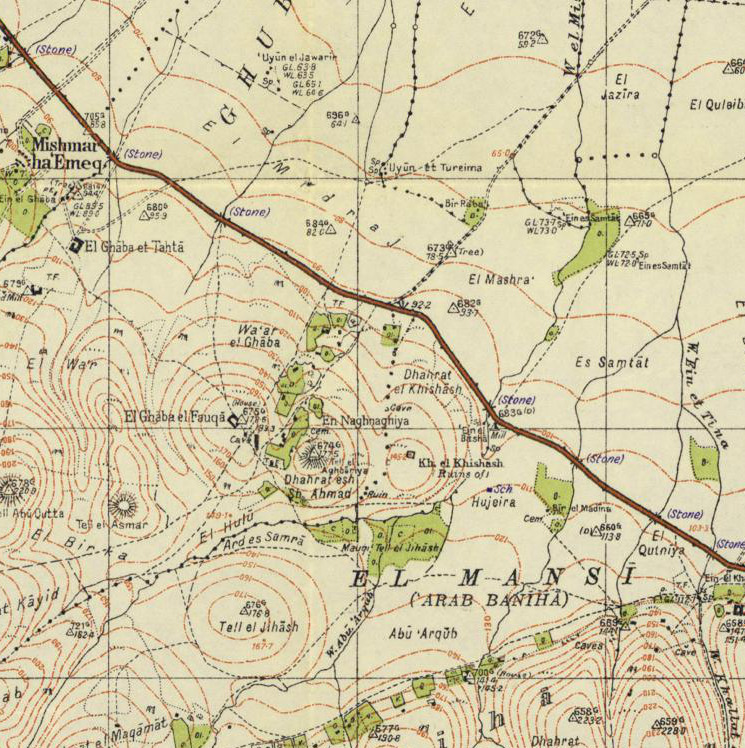
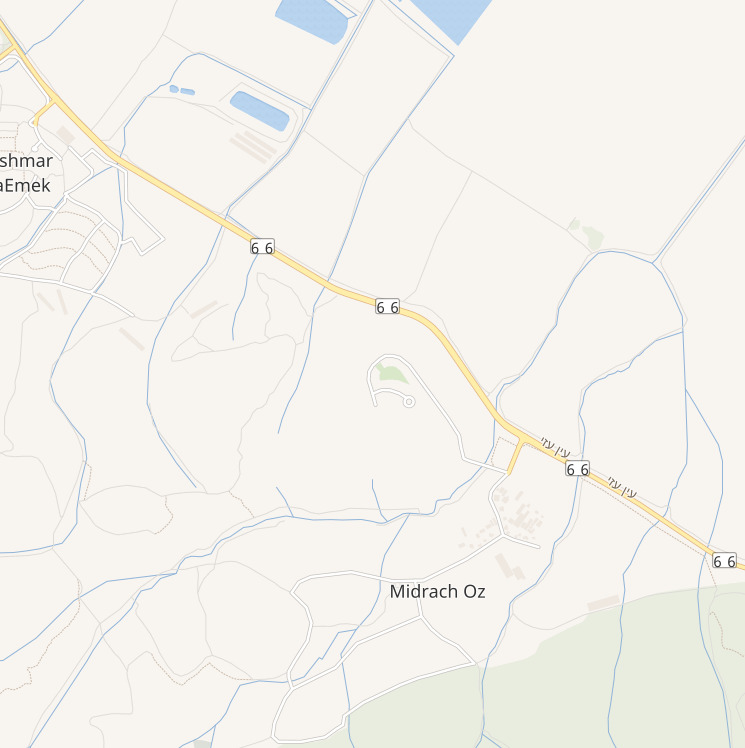
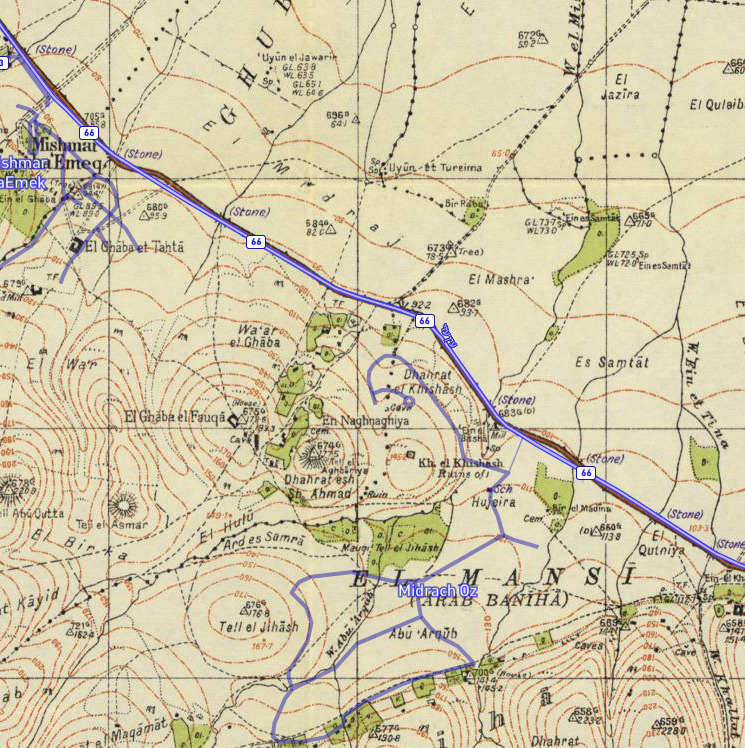
- 1870s map 1940s map modern map 1940s with modern overlay map A series of historical maps of the area around Naghnaghiya (click the buttons)

- Location within Mandatory Palestine
- Coordinates: 32°36′12″N 35°09′27″E
- Palestine grid: 164/223
- Geopolitical entity: Mandatory Palestine
- Subdistrict: Haifa
- Date of depopulation: 12-13 April 1948

Area
  - Total: 12,139 dunams (12.139 km^{2}; 4.687 sq mi)

Population (1931)
  - Total: 416
- Cause(s) of depopulation: Military assault by Yishuv forces

Naghnaghiya (Arabic: النغْنغية, Al-Naghnaghiyya) was a Palestinian Arab village, 28.5 kilometers (17.7 mi) southeast of Haifa. It was depopulated before the outbreak of the 1948 Arab-Israeli war.

== Location ==
The village was on the north edge of a hill at the edge of a wadi bed, overlooking the Jezreel Valley and the Nazareth hills to the north and northeast. It was the smallest of a group of three villages (known collectively as al-Ghubayyat) located together; the others were Al-Ghubayya al-Fawqa and Al-Ghubayya al-Tahta. Next to al- Naghnaghiya was an artificial mound that bore the same name. Two kilometers to the southeast, on the highway to Jenin was Tall al-Mutasallim, identified with Megiddo.

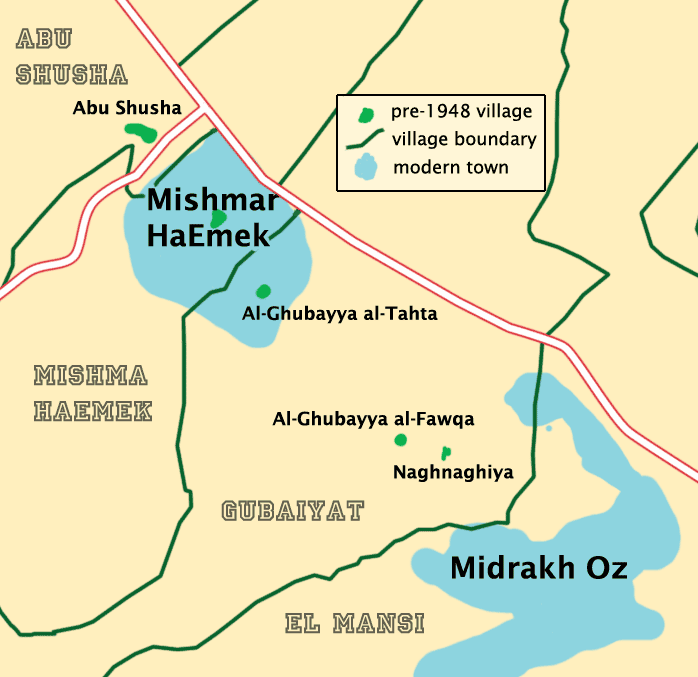
Naghnaghiya in historical context

== History ==
In 1888, during Ottoman rule, an elementary school was built that was shared by the three al-Ghubayyat villages.

=== British Mandate era ===
In the British Mandate of Palestine period, in the 1922 census of Palestine Al Naghnaghiyeh had a population of 272; all Muslims, increasing in the 1931 census to 416, still all Muslims, in a total of 78 houses.

In the 1945 statistics the population of Al-Ghubayya al-Fawqa, Al-Ghubayya al-Tahta and Naghnaghiya was 1,130, all Muslims, and it had 12,139 dunams of land according to an official land and population survey. 209 dunams were for plantations and irrigable land, 10,883 for cereals, while no data were given for built-up (urban) land.

In addition to agriculture, residents practiced animal husbandry which formed was an important source of income for the town. In 1943, they owned 139 heads of cattle, 6 water buffalos, 1090 sheep over a year old, 369 goats over a year old, 20 camels, 31 horses, 81 donkeys, 908 fowls, and 29 pigeons.

=== 1948, and after ===
Before the outbreak of the 1948 Arab-Israeli war, on the night of the 12–13 April 1948, Naghnaghiya and the neighbouring village of al-Mansi were attacked by the Palmach, a Jewish militia. By 15 April, both villages had been depopulated, and they were then blown up by the Jewish militia forces in order to block the return of the villagers.

According to the Palestinian historian Walid Khalidi, describing the village in 1992: "The remains of houses are scattered on the slope of one hill. The site, traversed by the Haifa-Megiddo highway and partly occupied by an Israeli soccer field, is difficult to identify."

== See also ==
- Battle of Mishmar HaEmek
- Depopulated Palestinian locations in Israel

== Bibliography ==
- Barron, J.B., ed. (1923). Palestine: Report and General Abstracts of the Census of 1922. Government of Palestine.
- Government of Palestine, Department of Statistics (1945). Village Statistics, April, 1945.
- Hadawi, S. (1970). Village Statistics of 1945: A Classification of Land and Area ownership in Palestine. Palestine Liberation Organization Research Center.
- Khalidi, W. (1992). All That Remains: The Palestinian Villages Occupied and Depopulated by Israel in 1948. Washington D.C.: Institute for Palestine Studies. ISBN 0-88728-224-5.
- Mills, E., ed. (1932). Census of Palestine 1931. Population of Villages, Towns and Administrative Areas. Jerusalem: Government of Palestine.
- Morris, B. (2004). The Birth of the Palestinian Refugee Problem Revisited. Cambridge University Press. ISBN 978-0-521-00967-6.
