= Al-Ghubayya al-Tahta =

Al-Ghubayya al-Tahta الغبية التحتا
- Village
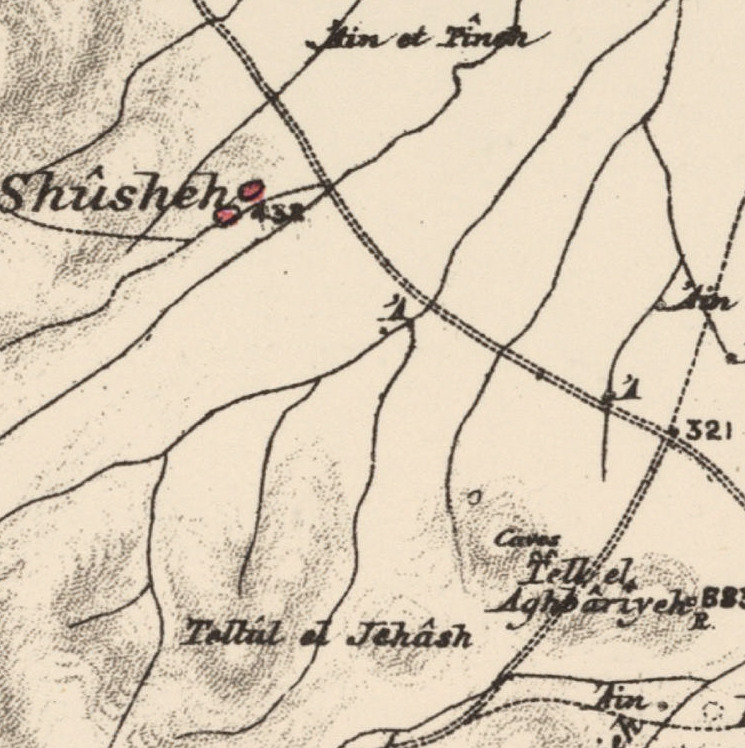
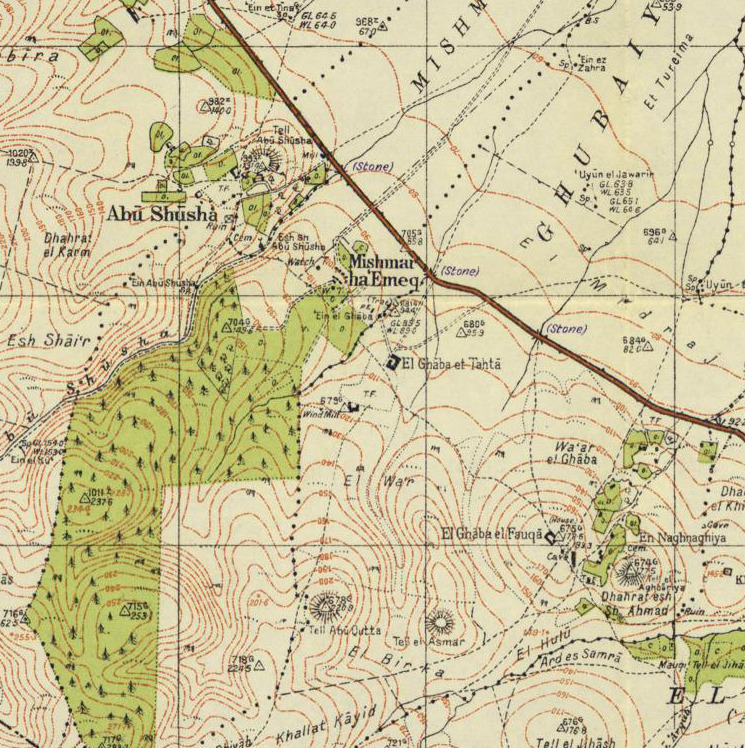
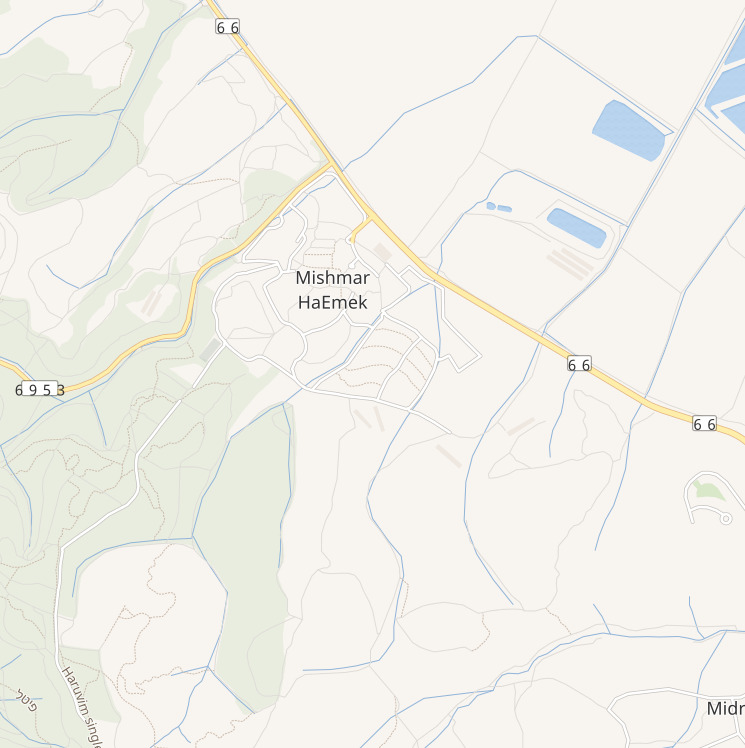
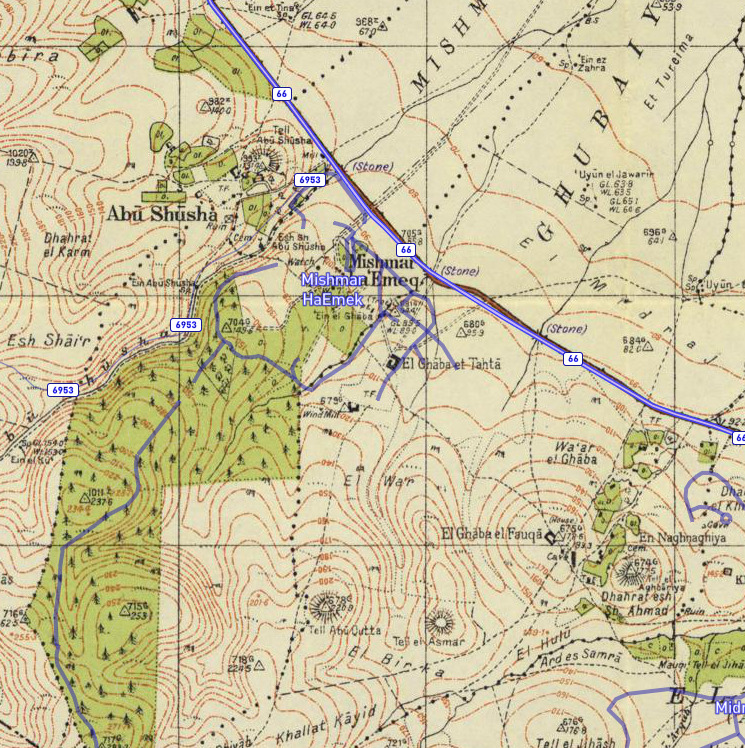
- 1870s map 1940s map modern map 1940s with modern overlay map A series of historical maps of the area around Al-Ghubayya al-Tahta (click the buttons)

- Location within Mandatory Palestine
- Coordinates: 32°36′27″N 35°8′38″E
- Palestine grid: 163/223
- Geopolitical entity: Mandatory Palestine
- Subdistrict: Haifa
- Date of depopulation: 8–9 April 1948

Population (1945)
  - Total: 1,130
- Cause(s) of depopulation: Military assault by Yishuv forces
- Current Localities: Midrakh Oz

Al-Ghubayya al-Tahta (Arabic: غبية التحتا) was a Palestinian Arab village in the Haifa Subdistrict, located 28 km southeast of Haifa. It was depopulated during the 1947–48 Civil War in Mandatory Palestine on April 8, 1948, under the Battle of Mishmar HaEmek.

The village was partly inhabited by Turkmens.

== History ==
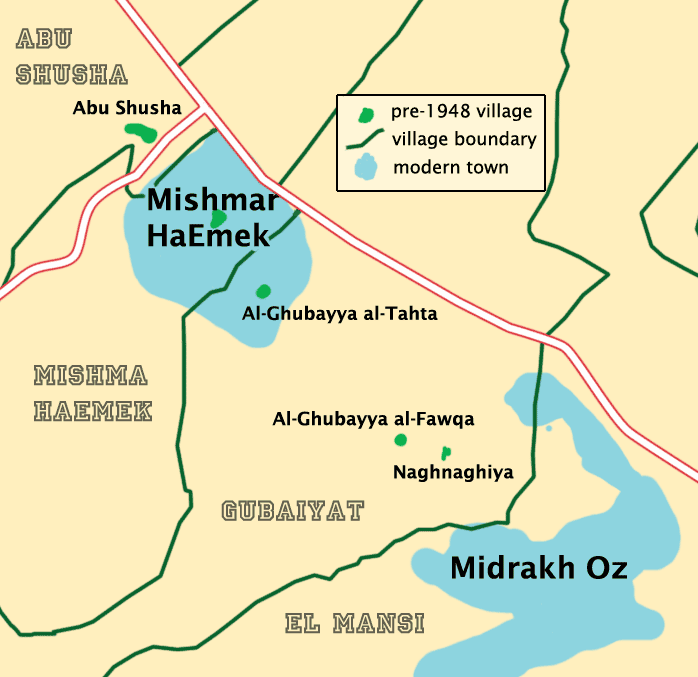
Al-Ghubayya al-Tahta in historical context

Al-Ghubayya al-Tahta shared an elementary school founded by the Ottomans in 1888 with the villages of al-Ghubayya-al-Fawqa and al-Naghnaghiyya. The school was closed during the British Mandate rule.

=== British Mandate era ===
In the 1922 census of Palestine, conducted by the British Mandate authorities, Ghabba al-Tahta had a population of 79 Muslims. In the 1931 census, the two al-Ghubayya village were counted together, the total population was 200 Muslims, in 38 houses.

In the 1945 statistics the population was counted with the neighbouring Al-Ghubayya al-Fawqa and al-Naghnaghiyya, and together they had a population of 1,130 Muslims, with a total of 12,139 dunams of land according to an official land and population survey. Of this, 209 dunams were for plantations and irrigable land, 10,883 for cereals, while a total of 1,047 dunams were non-cultivable land.

In addition to agriculture, animal husbandry formed an important source of income for the village. In 1943, residents owned 140 heads of cattle, 10 goats over a year old, 27 horses, 19 donkeys, 523 fowls, and 116 pigeons.

=== 1948 and aftermath ===
On 8 and 9 April 1948, the Haganah raided al-Ghubayya al-Fawqa, al-Ghubayya-al-Tahta and Khirbet Beit Ras, and proceeded to blow them up in the following days.

== Bibliography ==
- Barron, J.B., ed. (1923). Palestine: Report and General Abstracts of the Census of 1922. Government of Palestine.
- Government of Palestine, Department of Statistics (1945). Village Statistics, April, 1945.
- Hadawi, S. (1970). Village Statistics of 1945: A Classification of Land and Area ownership in Palestine. Palestine Liberation Organization Research Center. Archived from the original on 2018-12-08.
- Khalidi, W. (1992). All That Remains: The Palestinian Villages Occupied and Depopulated by Israel in 1948. Washington D.C.: Institute for Palestine Studies. ISBN 0-88728-224-5.
- Mills, E., ed. (1932). Census of Palestine 1931. Population of Villages, Towns and Administrative Areas. Jerusalem: Government of Palestine.
- Morris, B. (2004). The Birth of the Palestinian Refugee Problem Revisited. Cambridge University Press. ISBN 978-0-521-00967-6.
- al-Qawuqji, F. (1972): Memoirs of al-Qawuqji, Fauzi in Journal of Palestine Studies
  - "Memoirs, 1948, Part I" in 1, no. 4 (Sum. 72): 27-58., dpf-file, downloadable
  - "Memoirs, 1948, Part II" in 2, no. 1 (Aut. 72): 3-33., dpf-file, downloadable
