= Al-Ghubayya al-Fawqa =

Al-Ghubayya al-Fawqa الغبية الفوقا Ghubayya al Fauqa
- Village
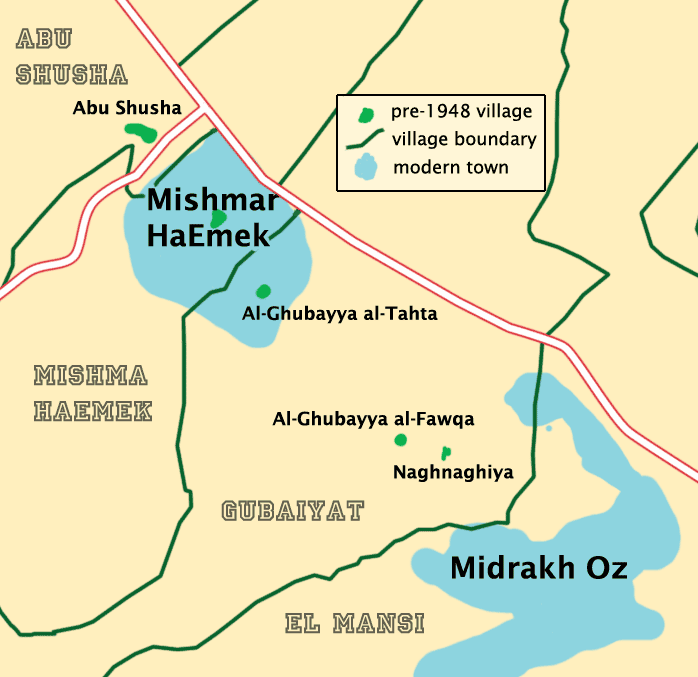
- Al-Ghubayya al-Fawqa in historical context

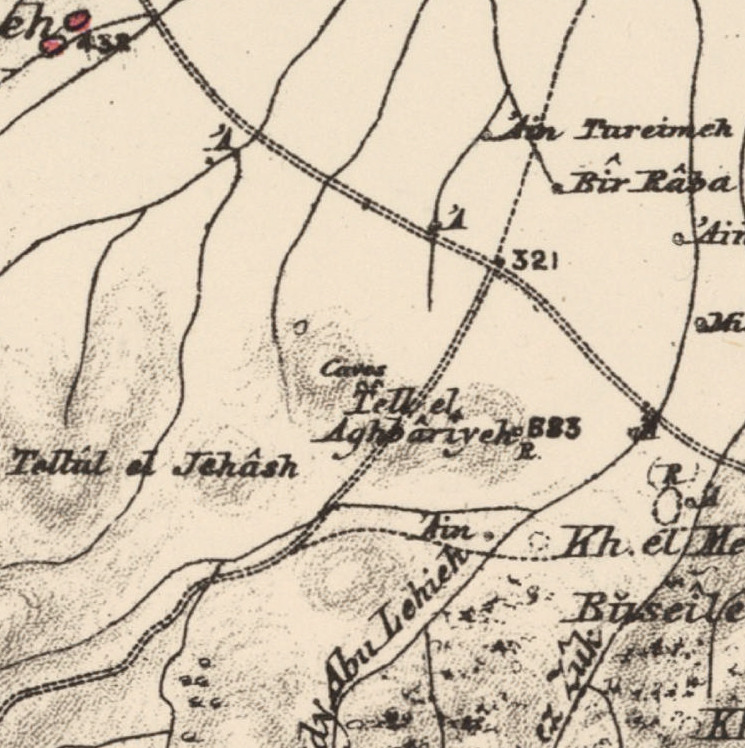
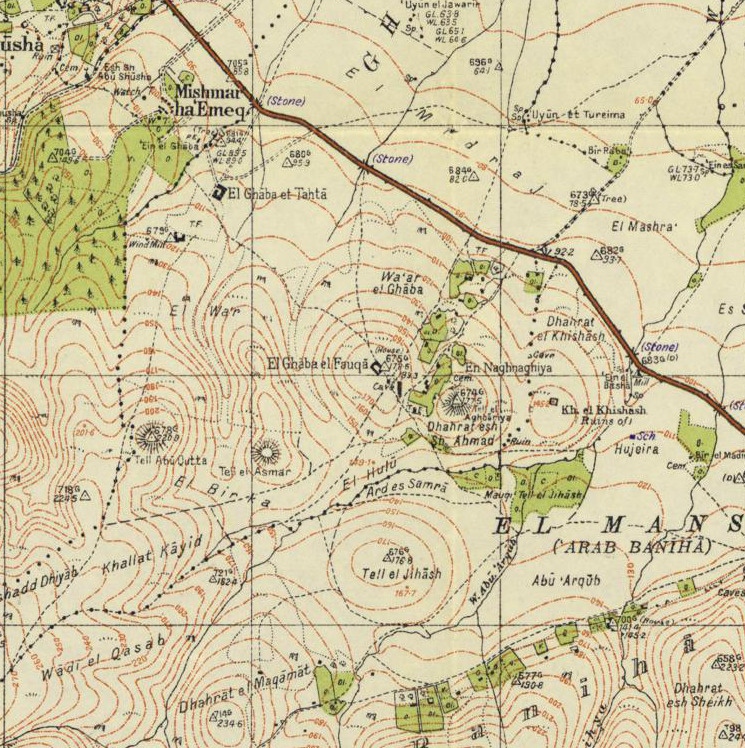
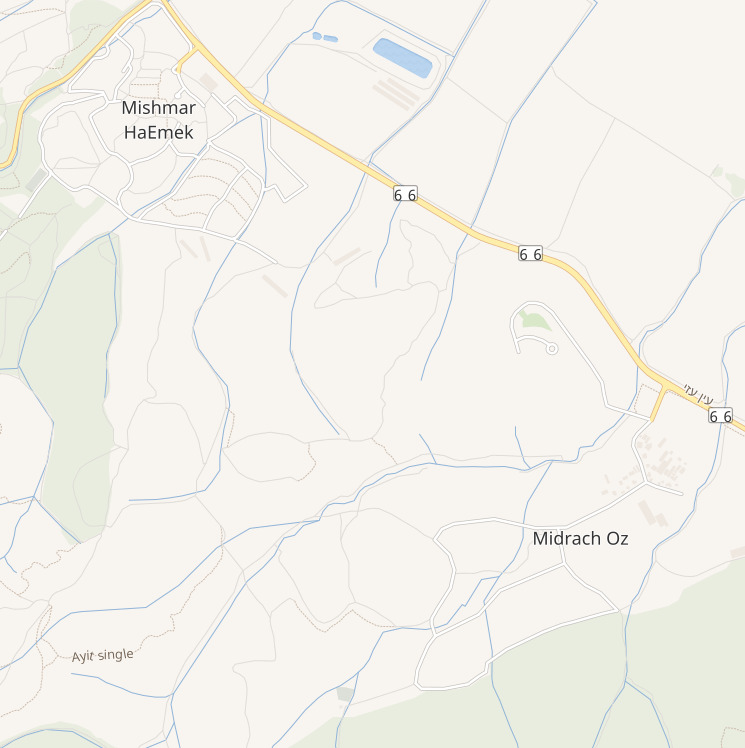
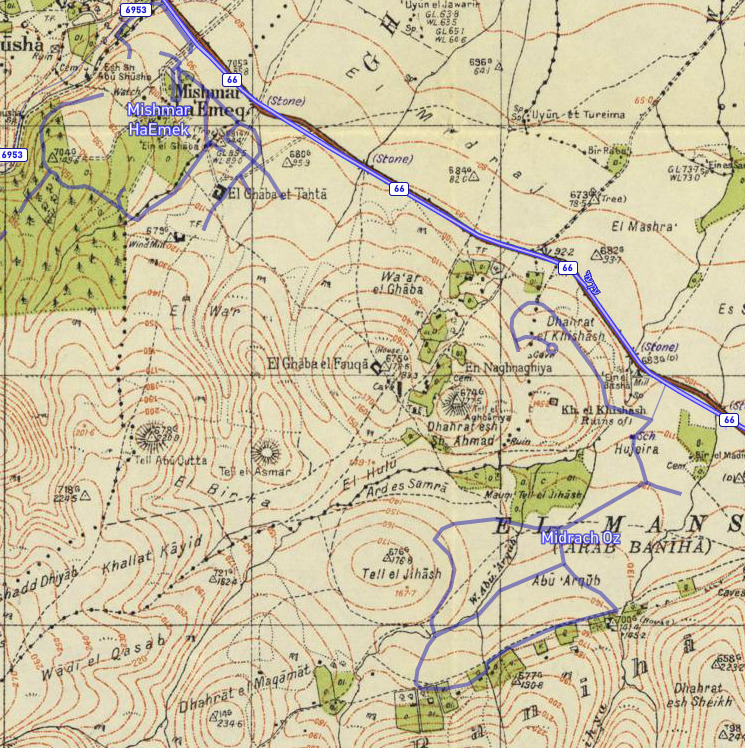
- 1870s map 1940s map modern map 1940s with modern overlay map A series of historical maps of the area around Al-Ghubayya al-Fawqa (click the buttons)

- Location within Mandatory Palestine
- Coordinates: 32°36′5″N 35°9′5″E
- Palestine grid: 164/223
- Geopolitical entity: Mandatory Palestine
- Subdistrict: Haifa
- Date of depopulation: April 8–9, 1948

Population (1945)
  - Total: 1,130
- Cause(s) of depopulation: Military assault by Yishuv forces

Al-Ghubayya al-Fawqa (Arabic: الغبية الفوقا) was a Palestinian Arab village in the Haifa Subdistrict. It was depopulated during the 1947–48 Civil War in Mandatory Palestine on April 8, 1948, during the Battle of Mishmar HaEmek. It was located 28 km southeast of Haifa.

The village was partly inhabited by Turkmens.

== History ==
During the early Ottoman era, in 1596 the village appeared under the name of Gubayya in the tax registers, being part of the nahiya (subdistrict) of Sahil Atlit in the Sanjak (district) of Lajjun. It had a population of 39 households; an estimated 215 people, all Muslim. They paid a fixed tax-rate of 25% on agricultural products, including wheat, barley, summer crops, goats and beehives, and water buffaloes; the taxes totalled 21,690 akçe.

Al-Ghubayya al-Fawqa shared an elementary school built by the Ottomans in 1888 with the nearby villages of al-Ghubayya-al-Tahta and al-Naghnaghiyya. The school was later closed during the British Mandate period. The village had its own mosque.

=== British Mandate era ===
In the 1922 census of Palestine, conducted by the British Mandate authorities, Ghabba al-Fuqa had a population of 41 Muslims. In the 1931 census, the two al-Ghubayya village were counted together, and the total population was 200 Muslims, in 38 houses.

In the 1945 statistics the population was counted with the neighbouring al-Ghubayya-al-Tahta and al-Naghnaghiyya, and together they had a population of 1,130 Muslims, with a total of 12,139 dunams of land according to an official land and population survey. Of this, 209 dunams were for plantations and irrigable land, 10,883 for cereals, while a total of 1,047 dunams were non-cultivable land.

In addition to agriculture, residents practiced animal husbandry which formed was an important source of income for the town. In 1943, they owned 104 heads of cattle, 32 horses, 23 donkeys, 500 fowls, and 64 pigeons.

=== 1948 and aftermath ===
On 8 and 9 April 1948, the Haganah raided al-Ghubayya al-Fawqa, al-Ghubayya-al-Tahta and Khirbet Beit Ras, and proceeded to blow them up in the following days. The report on 9 April from the Golani Brigade stated that they were "preparing to destroy the villages when we evacuate them". They destroyed al-Ghubayya al-Fawqa the following night.

Following the war the area was incorporated into the State of Israel. By 1992 the kibbutz of Mishmar HaEmek was using some of al-Ghubayya al-Fawqa's former land as pastures.

== Bibliography ==
- Barron, J.B., ed. (1923). Palestine: Report and General Abstracts of the Census of 1922. Government of Palestine.
- Government of Palestine, Department of Statistics (1945). Village Statistics, April, 1945.
- Hadawi, S. (1970). Village Statistics of 1945: A Classification of Land and Area ownership in Palestine. Palestine Liberation Organization Research Centre. Archived from the original on 2018-12-08.
- Hütteroth, W.-D.; Abdulfattah, K. (1977). Historical Geography of Palestine, Transjordan and Southern Syria in the Late 16th Century. Erlanger Geographische Arbeiten, Sonderband 5. Erlangen, Germany: Vorstand der Fränkischen Geographischen Gesellschaft. ISBN 3-920405-41-2.
- Khalidi, W. (1992). All That Remains: The Palestinian Villages Occupied and Depopulated by Israel in 1948. Washington D.C.: Institute for Palestine Studies. ISBN 0-88728-224-5.
- Mills, E., ed. (1932). Census of Palestine 1931. Population of Villages, Towns and Administrative Areas. Jerusalem: Government of Palestine.
- Morris, B. (2004). The Birth of the Palestinian Refugee Problem Revisited. Cambridge University Press. ISBN 978-0-521-00967-6.
- al-Qawuqji, F. (1972): Memoirs of al-Qawuqji, Fauzi in Journal of Palestine Studies
  - "Memoirs, 1948, Part I" in 1, no. 4 (Sum. 72): 27-58., dpf-file, downloadable
  - "Memoirs, 1948, Part II" in 2, no. 1 (Aut. 72): 3-33., dpf-file, downloadable
