= Yokneam Moshava =

Yokneam: יקנעם (Hebrew)
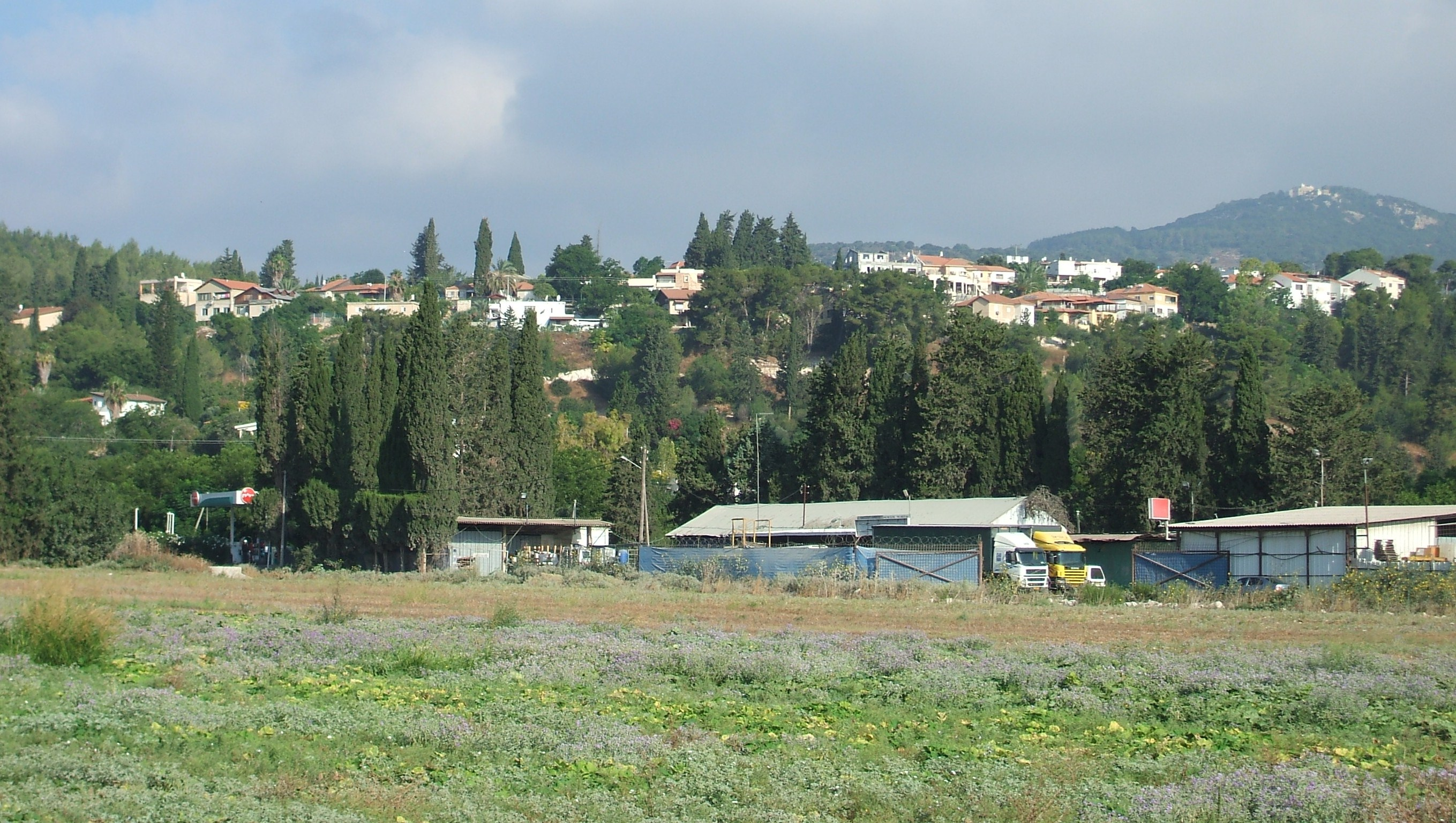

- Location within Jezreel Valley region of Israel Location within Israel
- Coordinates: 32°39′14″N 35°6′1″E
- Country: Israel
- District: Northern
- Subdistrict: Jezreel
- Council: Megiddo
- Affiliation: Agricultural Union
- Founded: 1935
- Founder: Jews from the Yishuv and Jewish immigrants.
- Population (2024): 1,487

Yokneam (Hebrew: יָקְנְעָם) is a moshava in the Northern District of Israel. Located on the outskirts of the city of Yokneam Illit on the border of the Jezreel Valley and the Manasseh Hills, it falls under the jurisdiction of the Megiddo Regional Council and is administrated by a local committee which is elected every five years. In 2024 it had a population of 1,487.

== Etymology ==
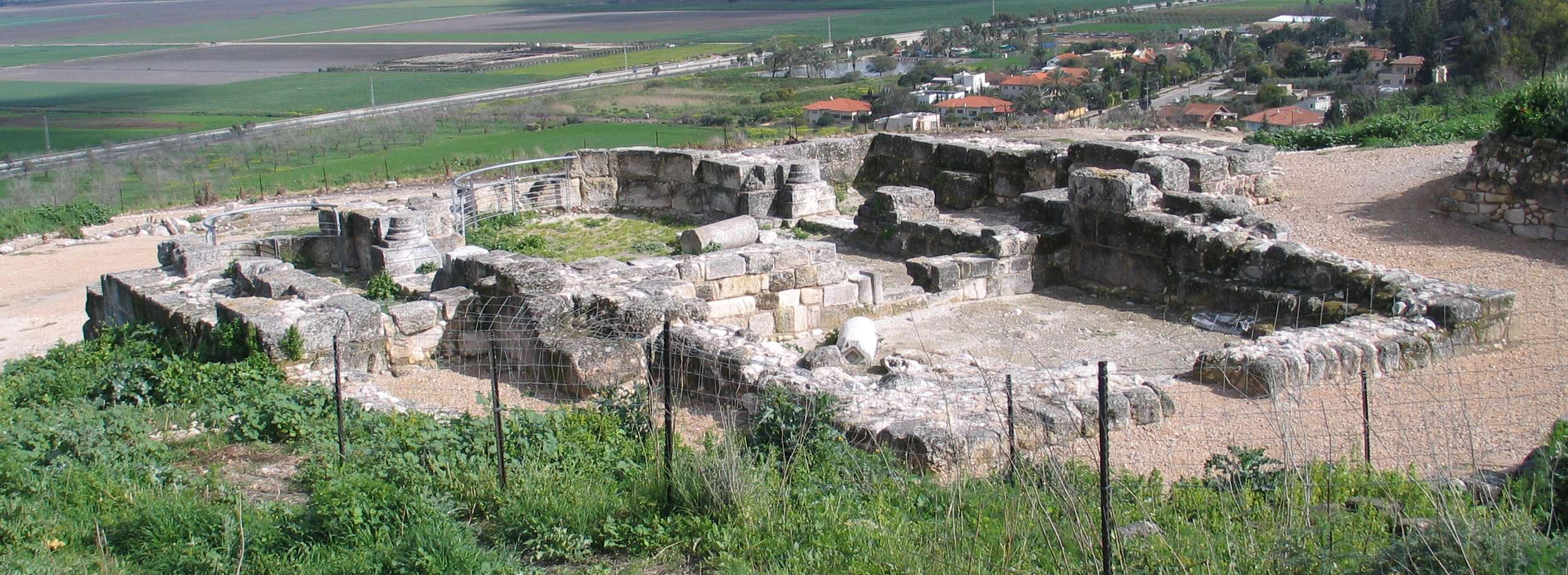
Tel Yokneam archaeological site.

Yokneam is named after a biblical city-state mentioned in Joshua 12:22: "The king of Kedesh, one; the king of Jokneam of Carmel, one." Yokneam is also mentioned in Joshua 19:10–11 as one of the borders of the Tribe of Zebulun: "And the third lot came up for the children of Zebulun according to their families: and the border of their inheritance was unto Sarid: And their border went up toward the sea, and Maralah, and reached to Dabbasheth, and reached to the river that is before Jokneam.

== History ==
In around 1872 the land was purchased by three families and was split into two sections: the first was owned by the Sursock and Tueni families of Beirut, and the second was owned by the Khouri family of Haifa. Both sections were the same size and together measured 17,500 dunams in total. An Arab sharecropper village existed on the land called Qira. It was located near the spring of the Shofet river.

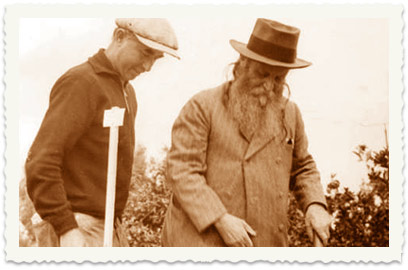
Yehoshua Hankin planting a tree in the Jezreel Valley.

The area was acquired by the Jewish community as part of the Sursock Purchase. Yehoshua Hankin, a prominent Zionist activist and one of the managers of the Palestine Land Development Company, who had had close ties with the Sursock family since 1891, planned to purchase land in the Jezreel Valley owned by the family. In 1924, the Sursock family initiated the deal and Hankin purchased the section of the land that was owned by the Sursock and Tueni families (8,750 dunams) for a price of 37,686 Palestine pounds. On 6 February 1934, after years of negotiations, Hankin purchased the other half from the Khouri family (8,750 dunams) for a price of 40,391 Palestine pounds. The Khouri family finally agreed to the deal because it went bankrupt. 3,200 dunams were transferred to the kibbutz of HaZore'a.

=== Early years ===
In 1933, 250 agricultural land plots were offered for sale. The buyers were Jews from Mandatory Palestine as well as families from Bahrain, Germany, Netherlands, Greece, Lebanon, Lithuania, Iraq, and Poland. The first families arrived on 2 December 1935 and populated 100 of the 250 land plots; they started fencing their plots and building permanent structures. The rest of the land was still held by Beduin sharecroppers from Qira, who refused to leave. Yokneam was unique because land was privately owned by the residents, who later transferred the land to the Jewish National Fund.

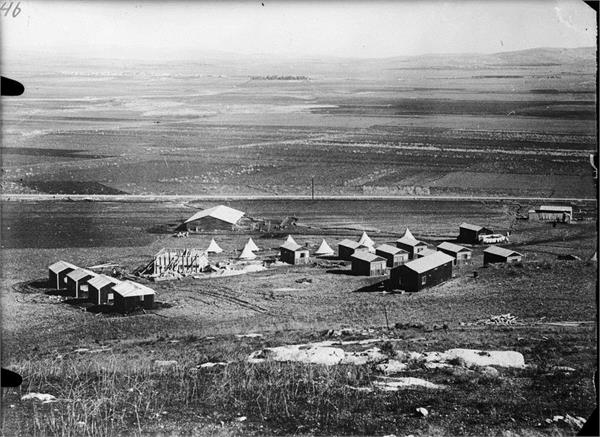
Yokneam 1937

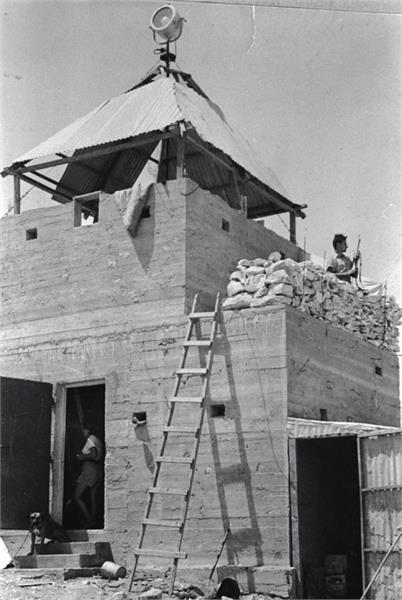
Yokneam watchtower 1937

The moshava suffered in its early years from lack of support from the authorities, undrained valley lands, hilly lands difficult for agriculture, and an overall economic crisis, leading half of the families to leave. One of the reasons for the economic crisis was that most of the land acquired for Yokneam was still populated by the two Beduin tribes, who inhabited the arable land in the nearby plains. While most of the sharecroppers left and received compensation prior to the foundation of Yokneam, attempts to mediate between the remaining sharecroppers and the Jews failed. Another attempt was made in 1936 with the help of an influential emir, who tried to talk with the mukhtar of Qira, but the outbreak of the 1936–39 revolt suspended the mediation. Another reason was the geographical challenges. The arable plain was subjected to floods while the arable parts of the hills were far from the area designated for the settlement itself. The village was planned to be divided by the Haifa-Jenin road (today Highway 66), which on the one hand created difficulties in planning the settlement, while on the other hand gave it an advantage as it was connected to major urban centers. The settlement was also not connected by road to the western part of the Jezreel Valley, with an abundance of Jewish settlements. Yokneam's farmers could not drain rain water because the water flowed through the territories still owned by the tribes.

During the Arab revolt, militants from Yusuf Abu Durra's group put heavy pressure on the sharecroppers not to leave the land. Following the suspension of the talks, residents from Yokneam and HaZorea tried to take land by gradually fencing fields in September 1936, but after a violent incident the British police intervened and the land was returned to the sharecroppers. In May 1939, after the end of the revolt, the mukhtar of one of the Beduin tribes sent a letter to Hankin, telling him he was willing to evacuate the land because the tribe wanted to move to Shefa-'Amr. The other Beduin tribe later agreed to evacuate. By fall 1939, most of the sharecroppers had evacuated the fields and the remainder stayed in Qira itself. During the three years of the revolt, Yokneam's residents earned their living from growing plums on the hills and from outside jobs.

The economic crisis ended in the 1940s after a member of the moshava, Perez Levinger, took it upon himself to administer the village. Levinger was described as the "central man, the leader, the Mukhtar, the ideological leader of Yokneam". In that time, Yokneam had some disputes with the nearby kibbutz of HaZorea over work, land, and water. In 1945 a municipality was established for Yokneam, with the status of a local council. In March 1948 the last sharecroppers fled the land in fear following the Arab defeat in the Battle of Mishmar HaEmek.

=== After Israel's independence ===
In July 1950, after the 1948 Arab–Israeli war, a ma'abara (absorption camp) was erected within the boundaries of the moshava, which at the time retained the status of a local council. Levinger headed the local council until 1955. Between 1950 and 1955, the village absorbed 60 families and the ma'abara absorbed 350 families.

Yokneam Maabara (1952)

The maabara initially housed 250 families. In early 1952, another 400 families were transferred there. In 1952, Yokneam was considered unusual in that it had a single school for all regardless of whether they were religious or secular, or from the moshava or the tent camp.

Yokneam was the only place in Israel where local elections were not held during the November 1950 local elections nationwide. The council of Yokneam, which was chosen in 1945, has decided to unite into a single list and thus was the sole candidate. The residents supported the decision and the new council promised to hold elections in the future.

In 1967, Yokneam was split into two local councils - the moshava – which joined the Megiddo Regional Council – and Yokneam Illit – which later became a city. The division was made due to the desire of the residents of the moshava to remain a rural settlement and not a development town. Both the moshava and Yokneam Illit developed a cooperative relationship and built a joint industrial zone, in cooperation with the Druze towns of Daliyat al-Karmel and Isfiya.

In the 1980s and 1990s, the moshava absorbed residents from urban areas. Today the moshava retains its rural character, with some residents working in agriculture and some outside the moshava.

In 2013, the mayor of Yokneam Illit appealed to the Interior Minister of Israel to create a committee to examine the option of annexing the moshava into the city, which the residents of the moshava strongly opposed. Yokneam Illit's mayor said that the city needed space for expansion and the moshava was standing in the way. In December 2013 the moshava, with the help of the Megiddo municipality, held a conference in Yokneam, to show support for the independence of the moshava. The director of the Ramot Manasseh Park, where the moshava is located, has revealed that out of 75% of the households in the moshava, 98% signed petition against the annexation plan. As part of the opposition to the annexation plan, the new Megiddo council elected in the 2013 Israeli municipal elections decided to hold its first meeting in Yokneam.
