= HaZore'a =

Kibbutz in northern Israel

Hazore'a
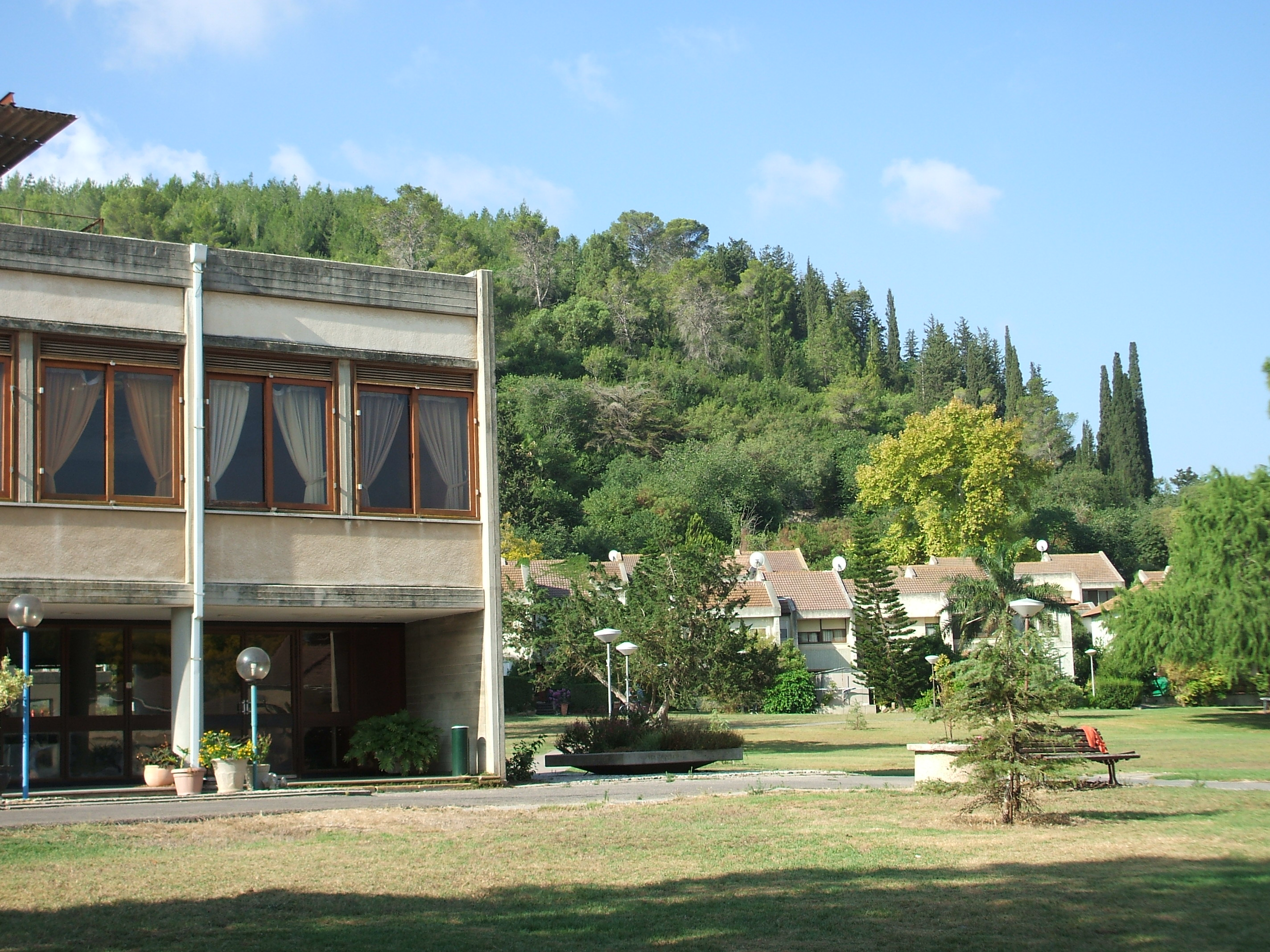

- Location within Jezreel Valley region of Israel
- Coordinates: 32°38′41″N 35°07′15″E
- Country: Israel
- District: Northern
- Subdistrict: Jezreel
- Council: Megiddo
- Affiliation: Kibbutz Movement
- Founded: 1936
- Founder: German Werkleute Members
- Population (2024): 1,031
- Website: www.hazorea.org.il

HaZore'a (Hebrew: הַזּוֹרֵעַ, lit. The Sower, named after the neighbouring Tel Zariq, Hebrew: תל זריק) is a kibbutz in northern Israel established in 1936 by German Jews. It is the only kibbutz that was established by members of the Werkleute movement. Located in the western rim of the Jezreel Valley, it falls under the jurisdiction of Megiddo Regional Council. In 2024 it had a population of 1,031.

== Geography ==
HaZore'a is located on the western rim of the Jezreel Valley, surrounded by HaZore'a Forest to the south and west of the kibbutz, Yokneam Moshava to the north and the fields of the Jezreel Valley to the east.

HaZore'a Forest is a section of the Ramot Manasseh Park planted on Menashe Heights by members of the kibbutz, working for the Jewish National Fund. The forest has around 20 million trees (Eucalyptus, Pinus halepensis, Cupressus sempervirens, Ceratonia siliqua and more). In the forest there are several recreation facilities such as paths to the Shofet River which leads to the Ein Ami spring and several lookouts.

=== Archaeology ===
Ein Hashrat is a cave located next to the Ein Ami spring, used as a burial site, with tunnels and rooms containing inscriptions from the Roman and Byzantine periods and burial tombs dating as early as the late Bronze Age. East of the cave is the site of an ancient settlement called Tel Qiri, where remains from the Neolithic, Chalcolithic, Middle and Late Bronze Age and the Iron Age were found.

== History ==
=== Establishment ===
The kibbutz is the only one in Israel established by the German Werkleute movement, a Jewish socialist movement that sought to find alternatives for Jews in Germany, but in 1933, after the rise of Adolf Hitler, adopted a Labour Zionist vision of joining the Yishuv in Mandatory Palestine and establishing a kibbutz.

In early 1934, the first group of pioneers arrived in Palestine. The sixty members split into two groups who received agricultural training in Mishmar HaEmek of the Kibbutz Artzi movement, and Givat Haim of the Kibbutz Meuhad movement, to learn the difference between the two movements. On 15 April 1934 the group reunited and concentrated in a Kibbutzim site in Hadera, where they chose the name HaZore'a. In Hadera the members established a tents and shacks camp, and they earned a living in Hadera's orchards, construction and laundry.

The Jewish National Fund chose an area of 3,500 dunams next to the moshava of Yokneam on the foot of the Menashe Hills and Mount Carmel, as the location for the kibbutz and a fund was raised in Germany to purchase the land from the Palestine Land Development Company, which purchased the land earlier from Arab landlords from Haifa and Lebanon. On 3 December 1935 the community, which had 30 members, settled in a khan which was abandoned by the residents of Qira, located between Yokneam and the land purchased for the kibbutz. Because of the slow evacuation of the Arab tenants, the community first received a narrow plot of 70 dunams. On 15 April 1936 the construction of tents and a carpentry shop was completed and all of the members moved to the land and began fencing their territory. In July 1936 the rest of the Gar'in members joined the kibbutz. In 1938 the kibbutz members decided to join the Kibbutz Artzi movement.

=== Early years ===
In the wake of the slow evacuation process of the tenants, at one night in September 1936 the members expanded the kibbutz's boundaries, without obtaining permission from the authorities. The agriculture in the kibbutz began to develop in the sectors of cattle, crops, nursery and vegetables. The members brought water to the kibbutz via horse-drawn carriage from Mishmar HaEmek. The financial hardships caused by the lack of land led the members to go work in Haifa as carriers, housewives and housekeepers. In 1937 a cowshed was established and first cows were purchased. In 1938 a vineyard was planted. Some members of the kibbutz earned their living in Mishmar HaEmek's bakery, forestry work for the Jewish National Fund and the construction of the Tegart's Wall. The British authorities agreed to expand the kibbutz's boundaries in hundreds of dunams. This allowed the kibbutz to build a chicken coop and develop the fruit and vine sectors. The first water well was drilled.

Days after the establishment of the kibbutz the 1936–1939 Arab Revolt broke out, forcing the members to temporarily sleep at the carpentry shop, whose walls were covered in gravel. The members set up a watch tower made out of wood and following shootings by Arab gangs more guard posts were set around the place which were manned all day. In 1937 a spotlight was installed in the watchtower and a weapon storage was built in the tower's first floor with permission from the authorities. During World War II members of the kibbutz served in the British Army and the Palmach. The kibbutz was used during the war as a paratrooper training camp.

In 1937, the members built the first fortified concrete building: the kitchen. A shack was set up and used as a dining room. The members began paving roads around the kibbutz. In 1938, the members built a structure used for laundry and public showers. In the next years the construction and development continue as children's houses and residential buildings were built. The kibbutz was connected to Mekorot's water supply.

On 6 September 1938, the British government issued an order that was supposed to allow the kibbutz and Yokneam to acquire the lands designated for the settlements on the plain region, blocked by Arab militants during the Arab Revolt. The British sent a large police and military force and the boundaries of both settlements was increased. HaZore'a received an additional 500 dunams. The order solved the land problem for HaZorea once and for all.

The kibbutz began absorbing Jewish groups which enriched its social fabric with a wide range of cultural views and languages: a youth group from Germany arrived to the kibbutz (1939) and later moved to Yakum; a group of Werkleute members called "Mishmar HaDarom" moved to the kibbutz (1942) after they failed to integrate into Shamir; a group of Werkleute members who participated in the Dutch resistance (November 1944); a youth group from Bulgaria (1947); a group called "Erez" from Syria and Lebanon who arrived during the Aliyah Bet (1947); a group of Hashomer Hatzair members from the United Kingdom (1948); a group of Holocaust surviving teenagers named "HaOgen" from Poland, Yugoslavia, Romania and Hungary (1948).

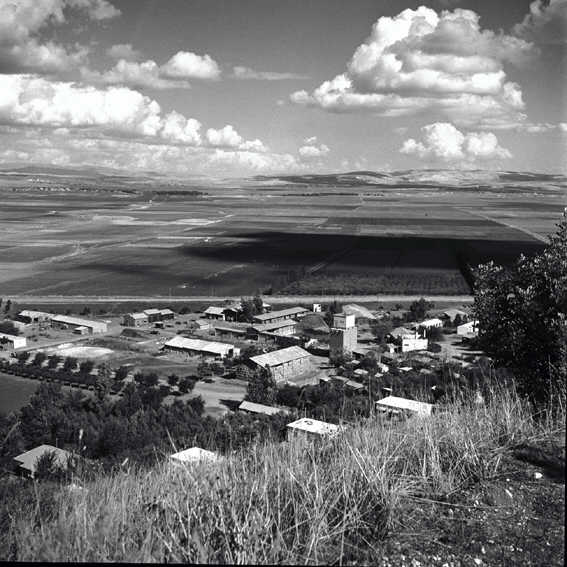
HaZote’a 1945

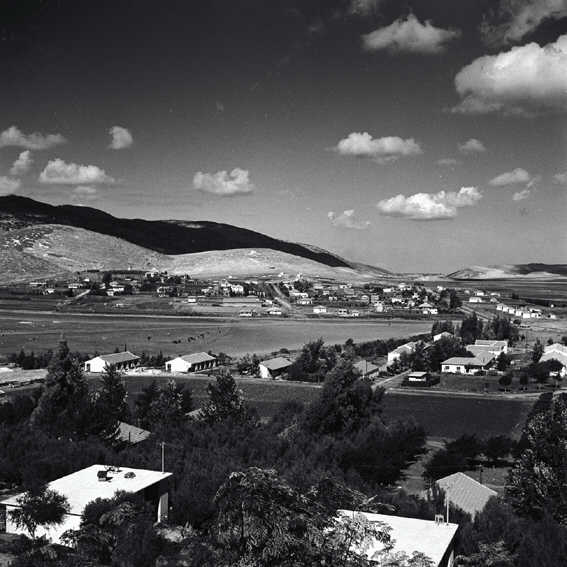
HaZore’a 1945

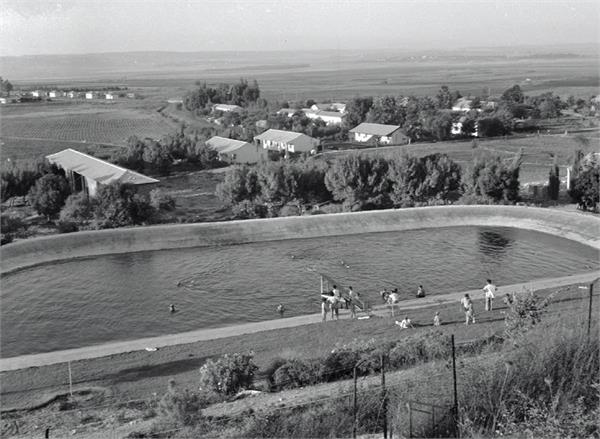
HaZore’a 1945

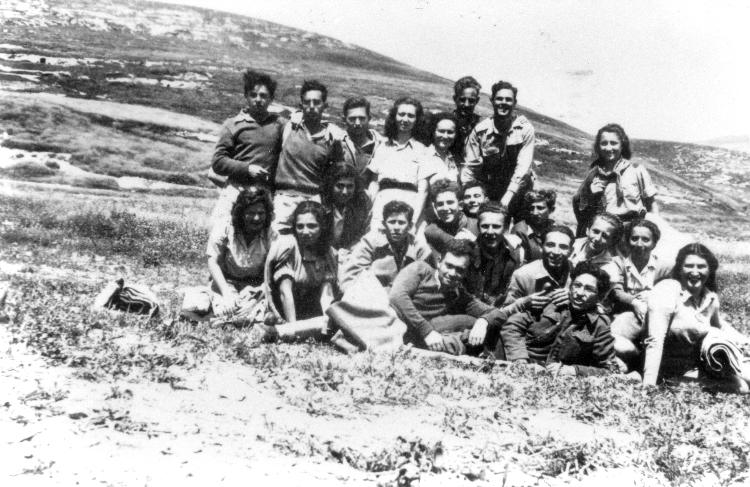
Yiftach Brigade members from Ein Harod on training week at HaZore'a, April 1948

=== After Israeli Independence ===
After the end of the 1948 Arab–Israeli war the territory of HaZore'a was increased in thousands of dunams, which allowed further development of the agriculture. In 1961 the kibbutz built a plastic factory called "Plastopil" and the carpentry shop was turned into a company called "HaZorea Furniture" The reparations from West Germany after the Holocaust helped in the construction of these facilities.

The arrival of new groups continued after the establishment of Israel. In 1952, "Bnei Ephraim", a youth group from North Africa, aged 10 and 11 were educated in the kibbutz and some of them chose to stay. In 1956 the kibbutz established an ulpan (Hebrew school) and some of its graduates chose to settle in the kibbutz. A group of Hashomer Hatzair members from the United States settled in the kibbutz in 1958 and 1959.

During the 1950s it was a center of Hashomer Hatzair attempts to work with the local Arab population.

== Economy ==
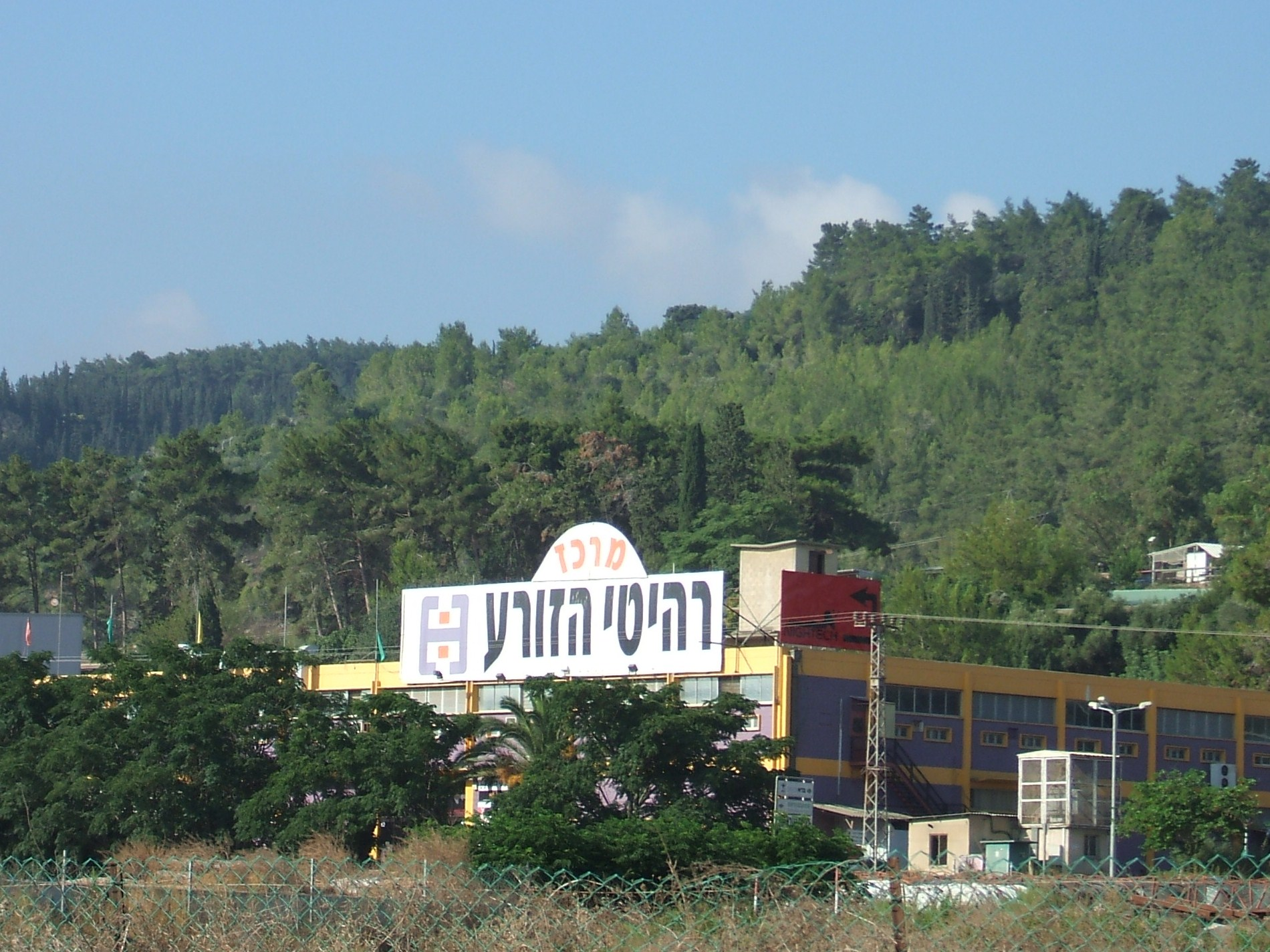
Hazore'a furniture factory

HaZore'a industries include a plastics factory ("Plastopil"), a cowshed, an aquaculture complex ("HaZore'a Aquatics"), a quality control centre ("Maba") and various field crops.

HaZore'a is undergoing a complex process of change from the model of the traditional kibbutz, where everything is equally shared, to a more individualistic form of settlement. Essentially, HaZore'a still operates as a socialistic society, providing uniform living conditions to kibbutz members. Nevertheless, several changes of individualistic nature have already taken place, such as privatization of services like the dining room and the electricity utility. Another example is official recognition of certain "residency" statuses, which allow some populations to reside in the kibbutz without being part of the economic collective.

HaZore'a is headed by the Secretariat with two officials in charge of social issues. The Community Council of 15 kibbutz members meets once a week to discuss matters needing further attention. The final decisive authority of the kibbutz is the ballot, for which all members are eligible to vote.

== Education and culture ==
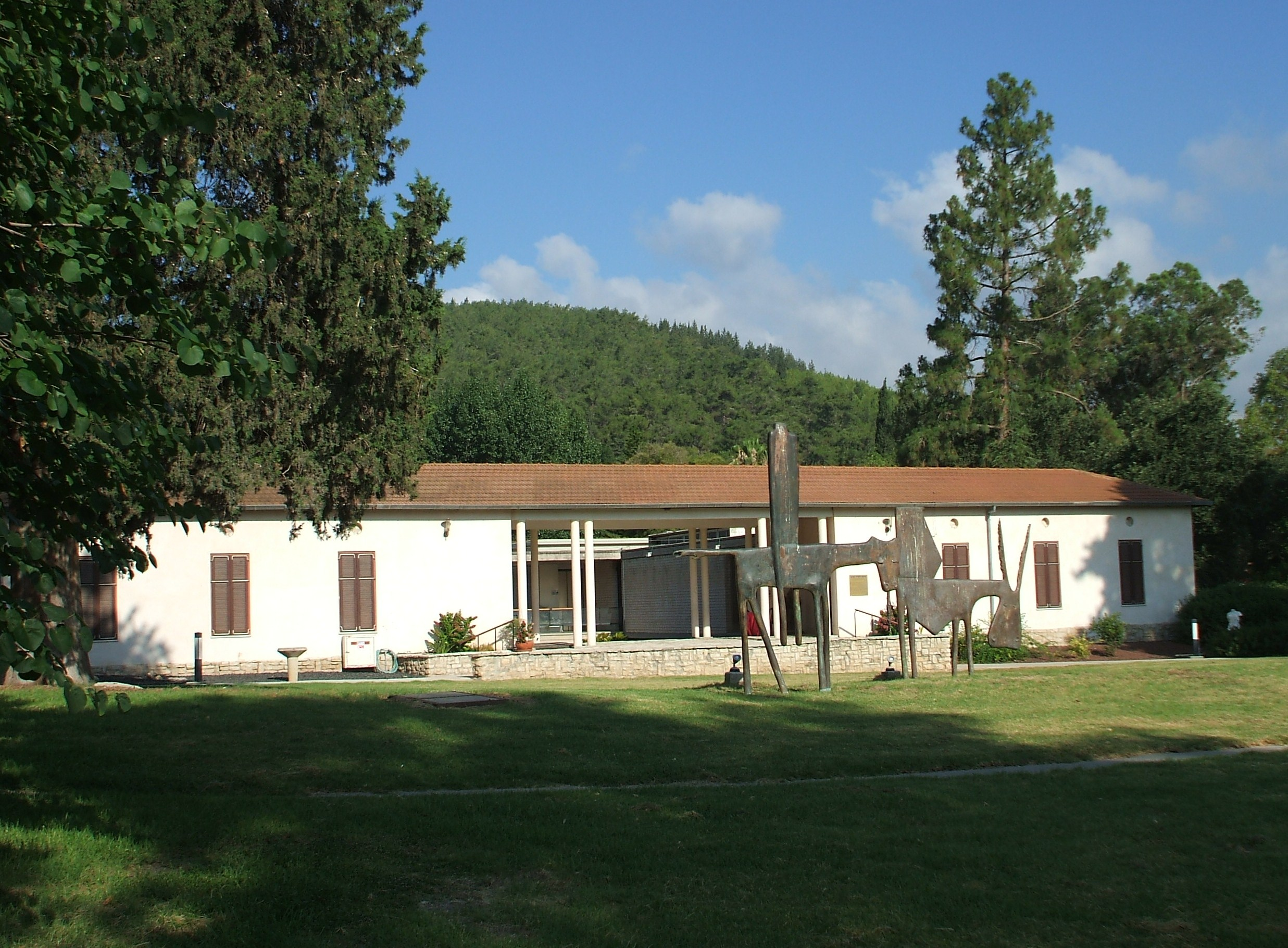
Wilfrid Israel Museum

HaZore'a maintains a communal dining hall and an auditorium for cultural and communal activities, such as celebrating Jewish holidays. The kibbutz issues a weekly paper titled "Ba'sha'ar" (English: "At the gate"), which serves as a medium for a variety of material concerning everyday life in the kibbutz.

HaZore'a is home to Plagim Elementary School (established 1991), where children from the kibbutz and five other settlements study 1st to 6th grade. The school belongs to Megiddo Regional Council, and is part of the Israeli state education system.

Another option, open to both Jews and non-Jews, is the volunteering program, offering a less obligating frame for young people to experience kibbutz life. There is also Garin Tzabar and lone soldier programs that reside on the kibbutz.

HaZore'a is home to the Wilfrid Israel Museum, an archaeology and art museum whose kernel is the Asian art collection of Wilfrid Israel. The museum was designed by Alfred Mansfeld. Significant Bronze Age archaeological finds, some displayed at Wilfrid, have been made on-site at Hazorea.

== Notable people ==
- Gideon Rafael
- Noam Chomsky

== See also ==
- List of Israeli museums

== Bibliography ==
- Levinger, Perez (1987). The Acquisition of land in the Area of Yokneam (in JSTOR) (פרשת רכישת הקרקעות באזור יקנעם) (Catedra: For the History of Eretz Israel and Its Yishuv, p. 153 - 170) (in Hebrew)
