= Abu Shusha, Haifa =

Arab village in Haifa subdistrict, Mandatory Palestine

Abu Shusha أبو شوشة
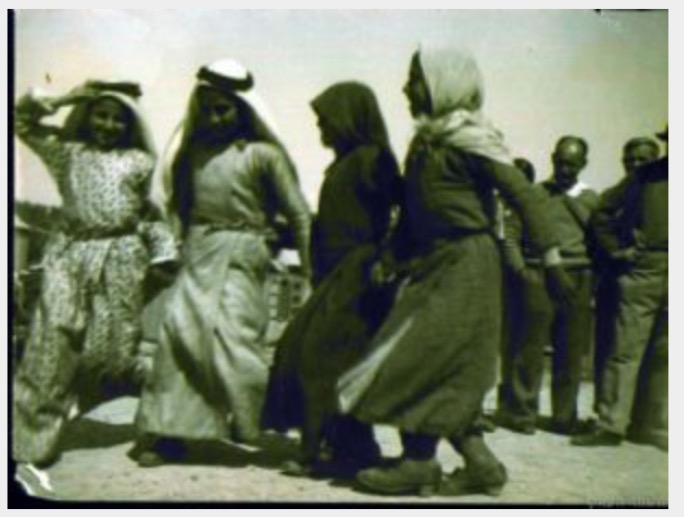
- Children in Abu Shusha
- Etymology: The father of the tuft
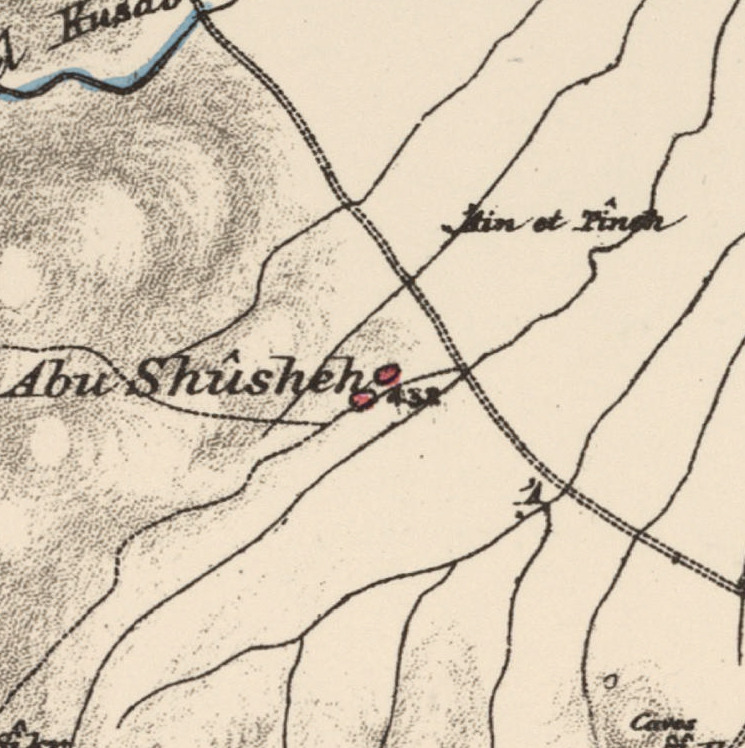
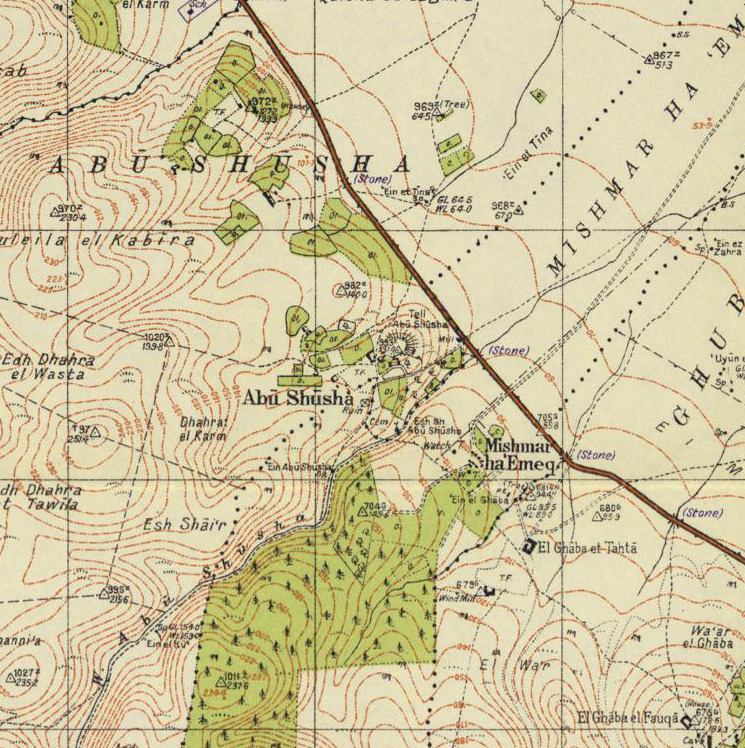
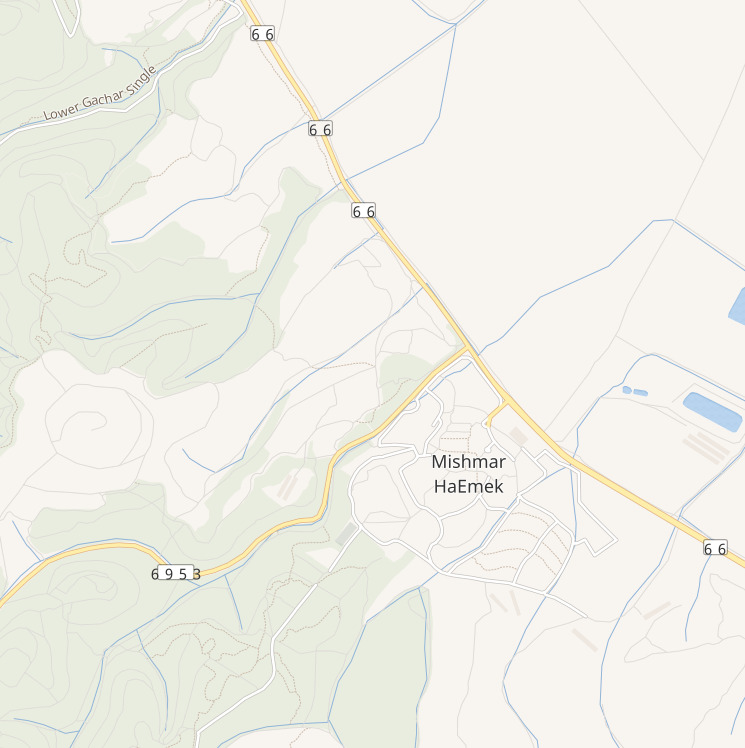
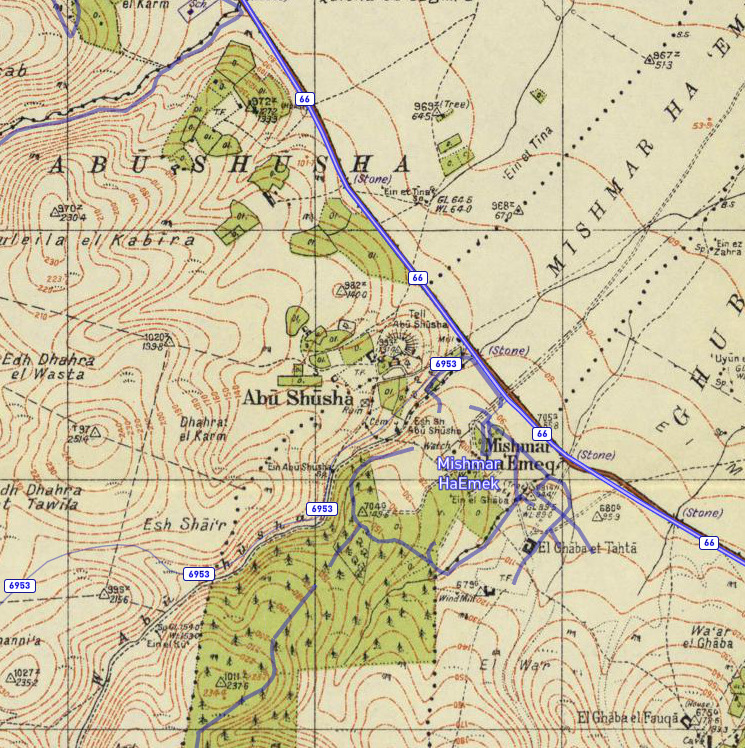
- 1870s map 1940s map modern map 1940s with modern overlay map A series of historical maps of the area around Abu Shusha, Haifa (click the buttons)

- Location within Mandatory Palestine
- Coordinates: 32°36′51″N 35°08′17″E
- Palestine grid: 163/224
- Geopolitical entity: Mandatory Palestine
- Subdistrict: Haifa
- Date of depopulation: 9–10 April 1948

Area
  - Total: 9 km^{2} (3.5 sq mi)

Population (1948)
  - Total: 835
- Cause(s) of depopulation: Military assault by Yishuv forces
- Current Localities: Mishmar HaEmek

Abu Shusha (Arabic: أبو شوشة) was a Palestinian Arab village in the Haifa Subdistrict. It was depopulated during the 1947–48 Civil War in Mandatory Palestine on 9 April 1948 during the Battle of Mishmar HaEmek. The village was inhabited by Turkmens.

== History ==
The village was located just west of Tel Shush, which recent examination shows may date from the Early Bronze Age. It has also been suggested as the location of the Roman town of Gaba Hippeon, founded in the year 61 BCE, by the Roman governor of Syria, L. Marcius Philippus. It was an episcopal see in the fifth-sixth centuries, and ceramics from the Byzantine era have been found here.

=== Ottoman era ===
In 1870 Victor Guérin described it as a small village. The slopes of the hill were covered with many piles of overturned materials from buildings, and on the highest point was the remains of an old tower.

In 1882, the PEF's Survey of Western Palestine (SWP) described "a little hamlet on the edge of the plain, with a spring to the east."

=== British Mandate era ===
In the British Mandate of Palestine period, in the 1922 census of Palestine Abu Shusheh had a population of 12; all Muslims, increasing sharply in the 1931 census when it was counted with Esh Shuqeirat and Arab el Saayda, to 831; still all Muslim, in a total of 155 houses.

In 1926 a small group of Jews from the Hashomer Hatzair movement settled in a caravanserai located on Tell Abu Shusha, before they moved to a location a few hundred yards south and established Mishmar HaEmek.

In the 1945 statistics Abu Shusha had a population of 720, all Muslims, with a total of 8,960 dunams of land. Of this, 931 dunums were plantations or irrigable land, 4,939 were for cereals, while 3,090 dunams were classified as uncultivable land.

In 1940s a resident called Salim Ibn Hussein moved to Syria and returned in 1947, infused with Arab nationalism and led the armed guard of Abu Shusha during the 1947–1948 Civil War in Mandatory Palestine.

In 1946, members of the Anglo-American Committee of Inquiry on Palestine visited Abu Shusha as part of educational tour, aimed at examining the political, economic and social conditions in Mandatory Palestine before crafting a solution to the problem of Jewish immigration and settlement. After visiting the nearby Jewish kibbutz Mishmar HaEmek, the British delegate, Richard Crossman wrote: “I’ve never met a nicer community anywhere.” By contrast, two hundred yards down the road, he later wrote: “Abu Shusha, the stenchiest Arab village I have ever seen,” where Crossman was treated to tea “on the [earthen] floor of a filthy hovel.”

=== 1948, aftermath ===
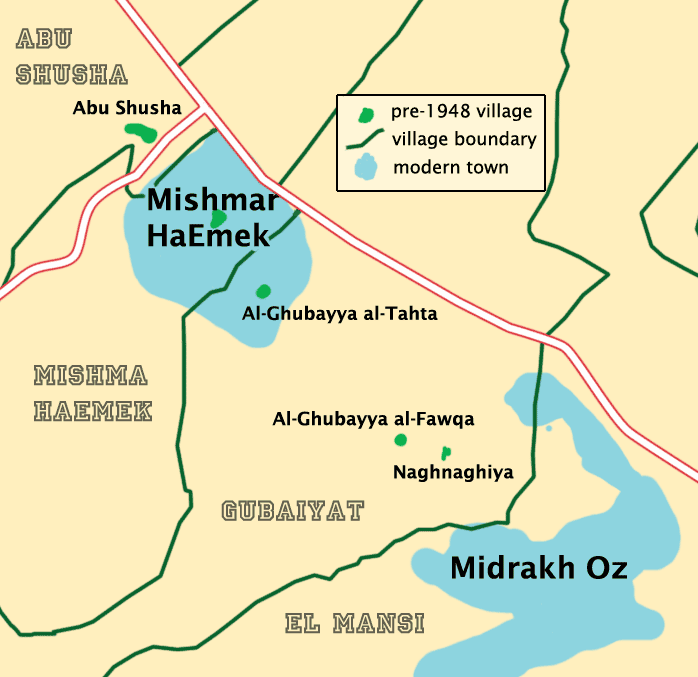
Abu Shusha in historical context

Few months into the 1947–1949 Palestine war, on 5 April 1948, the Arab Liberation Army (ALA) reached the area and used Abu Shusha among other villages as a base of operations to raid Mishmar HaEmek. The Haganah General Staff (HGS) instructed the Golani Brigade: "You must tell the following villages ... that we cannot assure their safety and security, and that they must evacuate forthwith." Among the four villages were Abu Shusha, Daliyat al-Rawha' and Al-Rihaniyya. According to Ben-Gurion, a delegation of Mishmar HaEmek leaders came to him on the 8th or 9 April, and told him that "it was imperative to expel the Arabs [in the area] and to burn the villages."

By the 11 April, the village was empty, and 1 Battalion in the Palmach blew up 30 houses in Al-Kafrayn and Abu Shusha in order to block the return of the villagers. Following the 1948 war, the area was incorporated into the State of Israel.

In 1992, Walid Khalidi described the area: "The only remaining sign of the village is the debris of houses, overgrown with cactuses. The grain mill is gone. On the hilly lands around the site, olive trees grow in a fenced-in area that serves as a pasture. The adjacent lands in Marj ibn Amir are planted in various crops, especially cotton."

Two village histories have been written about Abu Shusha and the Arab Turkoman; one in 1987 by Alya Khatib, and one in 1999 by Faisal al-Shuqayrat.

== Bibliography ==
- Barron, J.B., ed. (1923). Palestine: Report and General Abstracts of the Census of 1922. Government of Palestine.
- Conder, C.R.; Kitchener, H.H. (1882). The Survey of Western Palestine: Memoirs of the Topography, Orography, Hydrography, and Archaeology. Vol. 2. London: Committee of the Palestine Exploration Fund.
- Dauphin, C. (1998). La Palestine byzantine, Peuplement et Populations. BAR International Series 726 (in French). Vol. III : Catalogue. Oxford: Archeopress. ISBN 0-86054-905-4.
- Davis, Rochelle (2011). Palestinian Village Histories: Geographies of the Displaced. Stanford: Stanford University Press. ISBN 978-0-8047-7313-3. (p. XXV)
- Flapan, S. "The Palestinian Exodus of 1948" in 16, no. 4 (Sum. 87): 3–26. Simha Flapan records HaShomer HaTzair member Eliezer Bauer, who was also a member of the Mapam Arab Department reporting during a discussion that the villagers of Abu Zrik and Abu Shusha were arrested or driven out and the villages were then destroyed.
- Government of Palestine, Department of Statistics (1945). Village Statistics, April, 1945.
- Guérin, V. (1875). Description Géographique Historique et Archéologique de la Palestine (in French). Vol. 2: Samarie, pt. 2. Paris: L'Imprimerie Nationale.
- Hadawi, S. (1970). Village Statistics of 1945: A Classification of Land and Area ownership in Palestine. Palestine Liberation Organization Research Center. Archived from the original on 2018-12-08.
- Khalidi, W. (1992). All That Remains: The Palestinian Villages Occupied and Depopulated by Israel in 1948. Washington D.C.: Institute for Palestine Studies. ISBN 0-88728-224-5.
- Mills, E., ed. (1932). Census of Palestine 1931. Population of Villages, Towns and Administrative Areas. Jerusalem: Government of Palestine.
- Morris, B. (1987). The Birth of the Palestinian refugee problem, 1947–1949. Cambridge University Press. ISBN 0-521-33028-9.
- Morris, B. (2004). The Birth of the Palestinian Refugee Problem Revisited. Cambridge University Press. ISBN 978-0-521-00967-6.
- Palmer, E.H. (1881). The Survey of Western Palestine: Arabic and English Name Lists Collected During the Survey by Lieutenants Conder and Kitchener, R. E. Transliterated and Explained by E.H. Palmer. Committee of the Palestine Exploration Fund.
- Siegelmann, A. (1984). "The Identification of Gaba Hippeon". Palestine Exploration Quarterly. 116 (2): 89–93. doi:10.1179/peq.1984.116.2.89.
- Shatzman, I. (1991). The Armies of the Hasmonaeans and Herod: From Hellenistic to Roman Frameworks. Mohr Siebeck. ISBN 9783161456176.
- Tsafrir, Y.; Leah Di Segni; Judith Green (1994). (TIR): Tabula Imperii Romani: Judaea, Palaestina. Jerusalem: Israel Academy of Sciences and Humanities. ISBN 965-208-107 8.
