= Al-Kafrayn =

Al-Kafrayn الكفرين Kafrin, al-
- Village
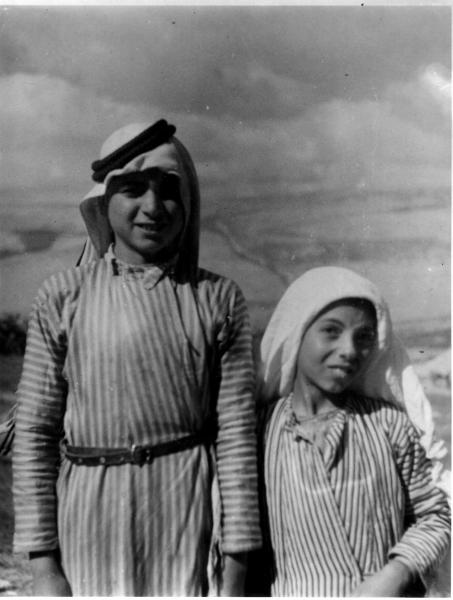
- Children of Al-Kafrayn, around 1937
- Etymology: "The two villages"
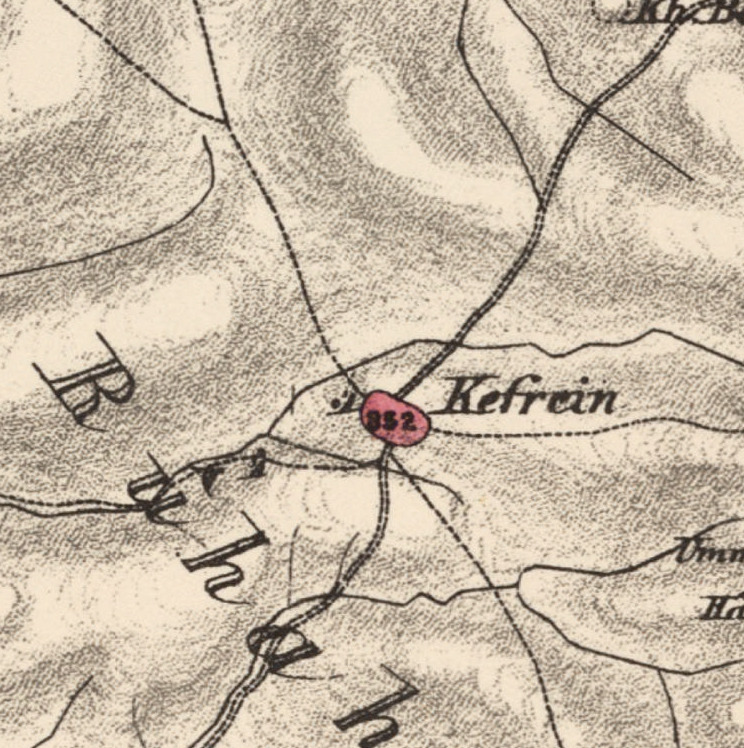
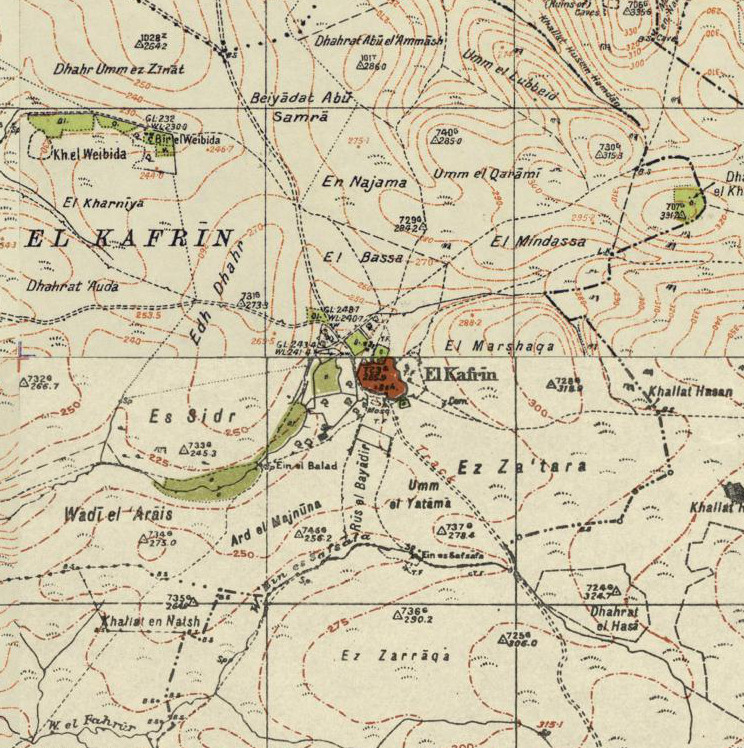
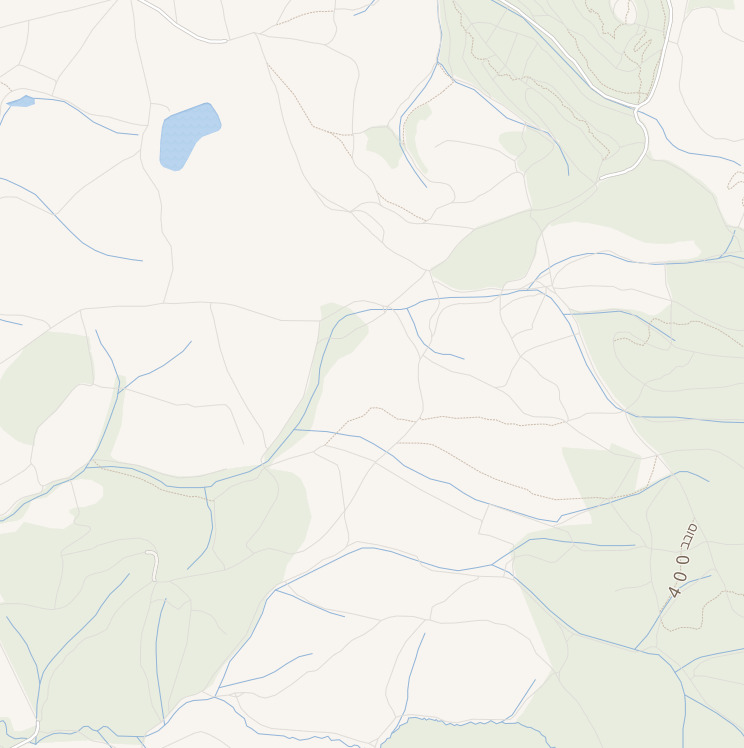
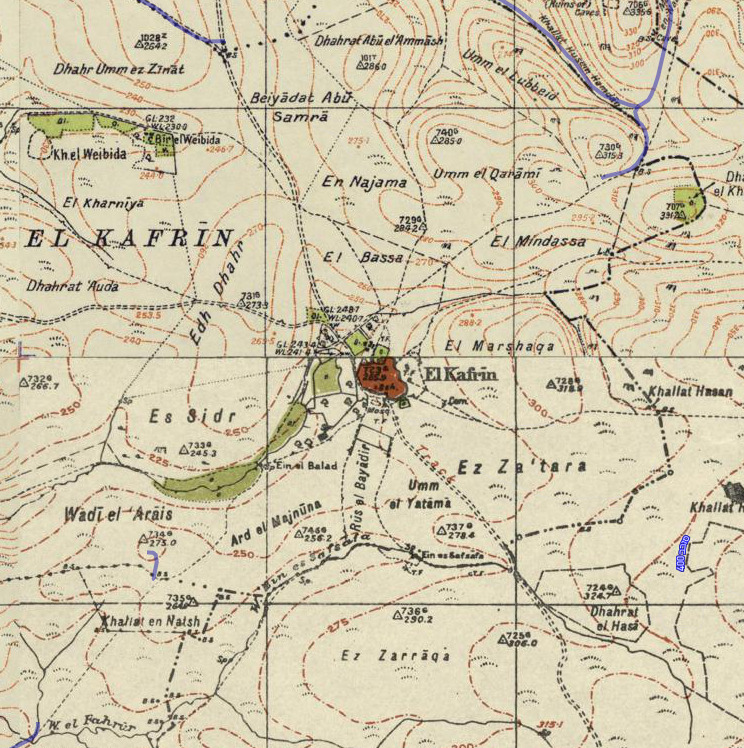
- 1870s map 1940s map modern map 1940s with modern overlay map A series of historical maps of the area around Al-Kafrayn (click the buttons)

- Location within Mandatory Palestine
- Coordinates: 32°34′25″N 35°07′08″E
- Palestine grid: 161/219
- Geopolitical entity: Mandatory Palestine
- Subdistrict: Haifa
- Date of depopulation: 12–13 April 1948

Area
  - Total: 10,882 dunams (10.882 km^{2}; 4.202 sq mi)

Population (1945)
  - Total: 920
- Cause(s) of depopulation: Military assault by Yishuv forces

Al-Kafrayn (Arabic: الكفرين) was a Palestinian village in the Haifa Subdistrict. It was depopulated during the 1947–48 Civil War in Mandatory Palestine on 12 April 1948 as part of the Battle of Mishmar HaEmek. It was located 29.5 km southeast of Haifa.

== History ==
Archaeological discoveries spanning from the Iron Age to the post-Islamic period have been unearthed at the site. That includes an ancient stone bowl with an inscription in Hebrew, using the Jewish script, was found. The inscription bears the placename "Geva", possibly referring to the ancient city of Gaba/Geva, located 5 kilometers away. This name was also discovered on two objects at the site of the ancient city.

The Crusaders referred to al-Kafrayn as Caforana.

=== Ottoman era ===
During the 19th and first half of the 20th century, al-Kafryan was one of the settlements in the margins of the so-called "Fahmawi Commonwealth" established by Hebronite clans belonging to Umm al-Fahm. The Commonwealth consisted of a network of interspersed communities connected by ties of kinship, and socially, economically and politically affiliated with Umm al Fahm. The Commonwealth dominated vast sections of Bilad al-Ruha/Ramot Menashe, Wadi 'Ara and Marj Ibn 'Amir/Jezreel Valley during that time.

In 1859, Kefrein was estimated to have a population of 200, who cultivated 30 feddans.

In 1882, the PEF's Survey of Western Palestine described it as "a village of moderate size, on the west side of the watershed, with a spring on that side." A population list from about 1887 showed that Kefrein had about 485 inhabitants, all Muslim.

=== British Mandate era ===
In the 1922 census of Palestine conducted by the British Mandate authorities, Al Kufrain had a population 571; 569 Muslims, and 2 Orthodox Christians, increasing in the 1931 census to 657, all Muslims, in a total of 95 houses.

In the 1945 statistics, the village had a population of 920 Muslims, and the total land area was 10,882 dunams. Of the land, 147 dunams was for plantations and irrigable land, 9,776 dunums (2,416 acres) for cereals, while 18 dunams were built-up (urban) land.

=== 1948 and aftermath ===
Al-Kafrayn became depopulated in April 1948 after military assault by Yishuv forces. 11–12 April 1948, the same day it was occupied, the Yishuv forces blew up some 30 of Kafrayns houses.

On 19 April 1948, the Palmach held an exercise in al-Kafrayn and afterwards they blew up the rest of the village.

Most of the villagers ended up in tent homes in the Jenin area, appealing to the Arab Higher Committee (AHC): "Thousands of poor women and children from the villages of Abu Zureiq and Mansi and Ghubayya and Kafrin and other places near the colony of Mishmar Ha‘emek, whose houses the Jews have destroyed and whose babies and old people [the Jews] have killed, are now in the villages around Jenin without help and dying of hunger. We ask you to repair the situation ... and do everything to quickly send forces of vengeance against the Jews and restore us to our lands."

Following the war the area was incorporated into the State of Israel. An Israeli military training camp was later built on the village's land.

In 1992, the remains were described: "The site and its surrounding area are divided between a military training camp and a cow pasture. A rubble-filled has been fenced in and is covered with dirt, underbrush and thorns. Almond, olive and fig trees are scattered around the site."

== Bibliography ==
- Barron, J. B., ed. (1923). Palestine: Report and General Abstracts of the Census of 1922. Government of Palestine.
- Conder, C.R.; Kitchener, H.H. (1882). The Survey of Western Palestine: Memoirs of the Topography, Orography, Hydrography, and Archaeology. Vol. 2. London: Committee of the Palestine Exploration Fund.
- Department of Statistics (1945). Village Statistics, April, 1945. Government of Palestine.
- Hadawi, S. (1970). Village Statistics of 1945: A Classification of Land and Area ownership in Palestine. Palestine Liberation Organization Research Center. Archived from the original on 2018-12-08.
- Khalidi, W. (1992). All That Remains: The Palestinian Villages Occupied and Depopulated by Israel in 1948. Washington D.C.: Institute for Palestine Studies. ISBN 0-88728-224-5.
- Mills, E., ed. (1932). Census of Palestine 1931. Population of Villages, Towns and Administrative Areas. Jerusalem: Government of Palestine.
- Morris, B. (2004). The Birth of the Palestinian Refugee Problem Revisited. Cambridge University Press. ISBN 978-0-521-00967-6.
- Palmer, E.H. (1881). The Survey of Western Palestine: Arabic and English Name Lists Collected During the Survey by Lieutenants Conder and Kitchener, R. E. Transliterated and Explained by E.H. Palmer. Committee of the Palestine Exploration Fund.
- Schumacher, G. (1888). "Population list of the Liwa of Akka". Quarterly Statement - Palestine Exploration Fund. 20: 169–191.
