= Haifa Subdistrict, Mandatory Palestine =

Administrative division of British Palestine (1920–1948)

Haifa Subdistrict قضاء حيفا נפת חיפה
- Subdistrict of Mandatory Palestine
- 1920–1948
- Capital: Haifa
- Population
  - 1945: 224,630
- History
  - Established: 1920
  - Disestablished: 1948
Preceded by	Succeeded by
Acre Sanjak; Nablus Sanjak	Israel
- Today part of: Israel (Haifa Subdistrict, Hadera Subdistrict, Jezreel Subdistrict)

The Haifa Subdistrict (Arabic: قضاء حيفا; Hebrew: נפת חיפה) was one of the subdistricts of Mandatory Palestine. It covered the northern Mediterranean coast of regional Palestine, southwestern Galilee, and the Wadi Ara region. It was disintegrated after the British withdrawal from the area. Prior to and during the 1948 Arab-Israeli War around half of the Arab localities were depopulated or destroyed. The entire district was captured by Israel and most of its Arab defenders were composed of the Arab Liberation Army and local militias.

Its predecessor was Haifa Subdistrict, Ottoman Empire.

The subdistrict was transformed into Haifa District, divided into Haifa Subdistrict and Hadera Subdistrict under Israel.

== Localities ==
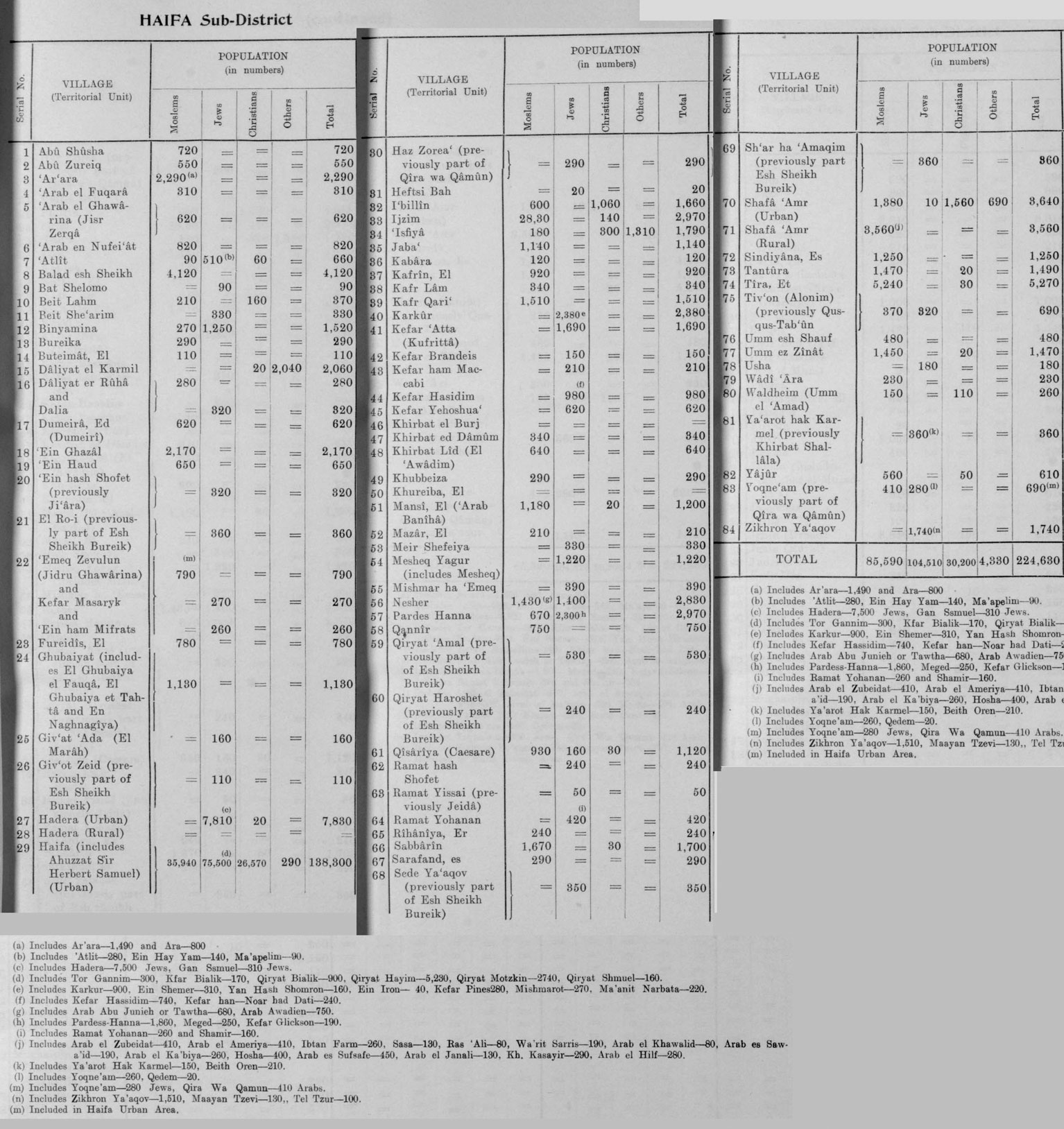
Official population statistics for the sub-district, from Village Statistics, 1945.

Haifa Sub-District – Population by Village
Village	Muslims	Jews	Christians	Others	Total
Abu Shusha	720				720
Abu Zureiq	550				550
‘Ar‘ara	2,290				2,290
‘Arab el Fuqara	310				310
‘Arab el Ghawarina (Jisr Zerqa)	620				620
‘Arab en Nufe‘at	820				820
‘Atlit	90	510	60		660
Balad esh Sheikh	4,120				4,120
Bat Shelomo		90			90
Beit Lahm	210		160		370
Beit She‘arim		330			330
Binyamina	270	1,250			1,520
Bureika	290				290
Buteimat (El)	110				110
Dalyat el Karmil			20	2,040	2,060
Daliyat er Ruha	280				280
Dalia		320			320
Dumeira (Ed)	620				620
‘Ein Ghazal	2,170				2,170
‘Ein Haud	650				650
‘Ein hash Shofet (previously Ji‘ara)		320			320
El Ro‘i (previously part of Esh Sheikh Bureik)		360			360
‘Emeq Zevulun (Jidra Ghawarina)	790				790
Kefar Masaryk		270			270
‘Ein ham Mifratz		260			260
Fureidis (El)	780				780
Ghubaiyat (includes El Ghubaiya el Fauqa, El Ghubaiya et Tahta and En Naghnagiya)	1,130				1,130
Giv‘at ‘Ada (El Marah)		160			160
Giv‘ot Zeid (previously part of Esh Sheikh Bureik)		110			110
Hadera (Urban)		7,810	20		7,830
Hadera (Rural)					
Haifa (includes Ahuzzat Sir Herbert Samuel)	35,940	75,500	26,570	290	138,300
Haz Zorea‘ (previously part of Qira wa Qamun)		290			290
Heftsi Bah		20			20
I‘billin	600		1,060		1,660
Ijzim	2,830		140		2,970
Isfiya	180		300	1,310	1,790
Jaba‘	1,140				1,140
Kabara	120				120
Kafrin (El)	920				920
Kafr Lam	340				340
Kafr Qari‘	1,510				1,510
Karkur		2,380			2,380
Kefar ‘Atta (Kufritta)		1,690			1,690
Kefar Brandeis		150			150
Kefar ham Macabi		210			210
Kefar Hasidim		980			980
Kefar Yehoshua‘		620			620
Khirbat el Burj					
Khirbat ed Damum	340				340
Khirbat Lid (El ‘Awadim)	640				640
Khubeiza	290				290
Khureiba (El)					
Mansi (El, ‘Arab Baniha)	1,180		20		1,200
Mazra‘a (El)	210				210
Meir Shefeiya		330			330
Mesheq Yagur		1,220			1,220
Mishmar ha ‘Emeq		390			390
Nesher	1,430	1,400			2,830
Pardes Hanna	670	2,300			2,970
Qannir	750				750
Qiryat ‘Amal		530			530
Qiryat Haroshet		240			240
Qisariya (Caesarea)	930	160	30		1,120
Ramat hash Shofet		240			240
Ramat Yissai		50			50
Ramat Yohanan		420			420
Rihaniya (Er)	240				240
Sabbirin	1,670		30		1,700
Sarafand (Es)	290				290
Sede Ya‘aqov		350			350
Sh‘ar ha ‘Amaqim (previously part of Esh Sheikh Bureik)		360			360
Shafa ‘Amr (Urban)	1,380	10	1,560	690	3,640
Shafa ‘Amr (Rural)	3,560				3,560
Sindiyana (Es)	1,250				1,250
Tantura	1,470		20		1,490
Tira (Et)	5,240		30		5,270
Tiv‘on (Alonim)	370	320			690
Umm esh Shauf	480				480
Umm ez Zinat	1,450		20		1,470
Usha		180			180
Wadi ‘Ara	230				230
Waldheim (Umm el ‘Amad)	150		110		260
Ya‘arot hak Karmel (previously Khirbat Shalala)		360			360
Yajur	560		50		610
Yoqne‘am (previously part of Qira wa Qamun)	410	280			690
Zikhron Ya‘aqov		1,740			1,740
TOTAL	85,590	104,510	30,200	4,330	224,630

=== Depopulated towns and villages ===
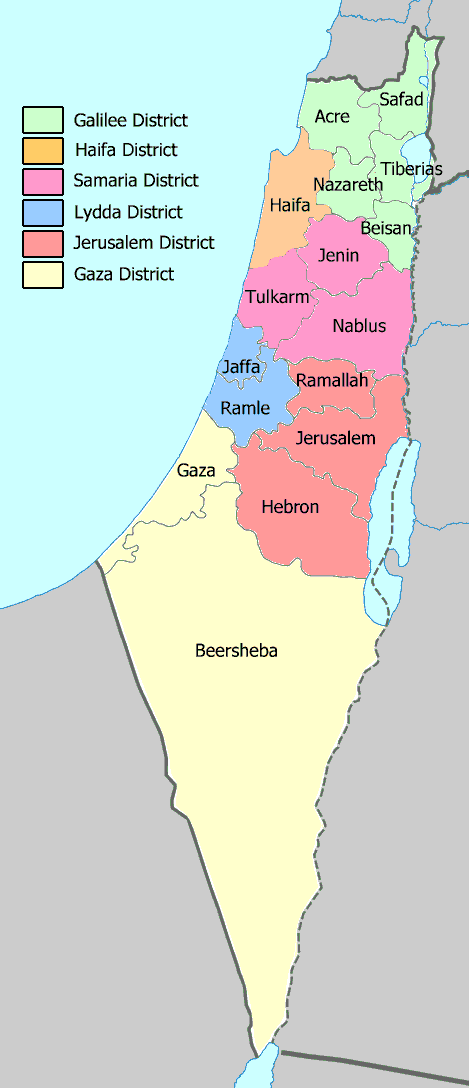
Subdistricts grouped by districts in 1945.

Former localities	Existing localities
Abu Shusha; Abu Zurayq; Arab al-Fuqara; Arab al-Nufayat; Arab Zahrat al-Dumayri; Ayn Ghazal; Ayn Hawd; Balad ash-Sheikh; Barrat Qisarya; Beit Lehem; Burayka; al-Burj, Khirbat; al-Butaymat; Daliyat al-Rawha; al-Damun, Khirbat; al-Dumayri; al-Ghubayya al-Fawqa; al-Ghubayya al-Tahta; Hawsha; Ijzim; Jaba'; al-Jalama; Jebata; Kabara; Kafr Lam; al-Kafrayn; al-Kasayir, Khirbat; Khubbaiza; Lid, Khirbat; al-Manara; al-Manara, Khirbat; al-Mansi; al-Mansura; al-Mansura, Khirbat; al-Mazar; al-Naghnaghiyya; Qannir; Qira; Qisarya; Qumbaza, Khirbat; al-Rihaniyya; Sabbarin; al-Sarafand; al-Sarkas, Khirbat; Sa'sa', Khirbat; Al-Sawamir, Khirbat; Sheikh Bureik; al-Shuna, Khirbat; al-Sindiyana; al-Tantura; al-Tira; Umm al-Shawf; Umm al-Zinat; Wa'arat al-Sarris; Wadi Ara; Waldheim (Umm al 'Amad); Yajur	Alonei Abba; Amriyye; 'Ara; Ar'ara; Atlit; Basmat Tab'un; Bethlehem of Galilee; Binyamina; Buweishat; Daliyat al-Carmel; Fureidis; Gvat; Hadera; Haifa; Hajajra; Hilf; al-Humeira; I'billin; Ibtin; Isifiya; Jeida; Jisr az-Zarqa; Ka'abiyya; Kababir; Kafr Qara; Karkur; Khawalid; Kiryat Atta; Kiryat Bialik; Kiryat Motzkin; Meiser; Pardes Hanna; Ras Ali; al-Maqura, Khirbat; Sa'ayda; Sarkis; Shefa-'Amr; Shimron; Umm al-Qutuf; Zikhron Ya'akov; al-Zubeidat

== See also ==
- Haifa District For Jewish localities established before 1947.
