= Abu Zurayq =

Abu Zurayq Abu Zureiq or Abu Zreiq
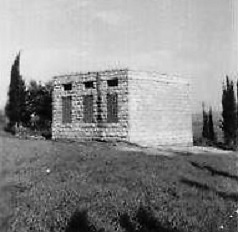
- A school in Abu Zurayq, pre-1948
- Interactive map of Abu Zurayq
- Palestine grid: 162/226
- Geopolitical entity: Mandatory Palestine
- Subdistrict: Haifa
- Date of depopulation: April 12–13, 1948

Area
  - Total: 6,493 dunams (6.493 km^{2}; 2.507 sq mi)

Population (1945)
  - Total: 550
- Cause(s) of depopulation: 1948 Palestinian expulsion

Abu Zurayq or Abu Zureiq (Arabic أبو زريق) is a cluster of archaeological sites at a well-watered spot at the western edge of the Jezreel Valley and its transition to the Menashe Heights, next to Highway 66, between the modern kibbutzim of HaZore'a and Mishmar HaEmek.

The site includes a tell (archaeological mound) called in Hebrew Tel Zariq (תל זריק) and Tell Abu Zureiq in Arabic, a spring called Ein Zariq, and other sites around it. The site was surveyed by Avner Raban as part of the survey of the Mishmar HaEmek area between 1974 and 1976. Based on the pottery collected by his team, the site was inhabited continuously from the Neolithic to the Ottoman periods. The site is named after a Muslim saint who is buried there.

In the 20th century, it was a Palestinian Turkmen village in the Haifa Subdistrict of Mandatory Palestine, situated near Wadi Abu Zurayq. The area was also named Et Tawatiha, after the al-Tawatiha tribe, one of the three "true" Turkmen tribes in Palestine.

It was depopulated on April 12–13 during and after the Battle of Mishmar HaEmek of the 1947–48 Civil War in Mandatory Palestine.

== Location; palaeogeography ==
Abu Zurayq village was situated in the northern foothills of an area overlooking the Jezreel Valley called "Bilad al-Rawha" ('The Fragrant Country'). It depended on a number of water sources in its vicinity including the spring of Ein Abu Zurayq, the Wadi Abu Zurayq stream, and a well.

The prehistoric site of Abu Zurayq was found south of the mound, on the sloping terrace east of the foothills of the Menashe Heights. During the Neolithic period there was a large lake next to the site covering part of what is today the Jezreel Valley.

== Archaeological exploration ==
The site was excavated by three different expeditions. The first was headed by Jean Perrot in 1962 and excavated south of the mound. The final report of the excavation was published by Yosef Garfinkel and Zinovi Matskevich in 2002. The second expedition included Italians from Centro Camuno di Studi Preistorici and Israelis from the Tel Aviv University and the Wilfrid Israel museum. They excavated the site from December 1970 to April 1971. The third expedition, headed by Aviram Oshri on behalf of the Israel Antiquities Authority, conducted a salvage excavation at the site after the construction of light posts for the Zariq junction near the site has damaged antiquities.

== Archaeological periods ==
The survey done by A. Raban during the Mishmar HaEmek survey (1974-1976) concluded, based on pottery findings, that the site was inhabited continuously from the Neolithic to the Ottoman periods.

Perrot's excavation has revealed a few Paleolithic flints in very bad shape. The Italian-Israeli expedition has dated similar finds to the Upper Paleolithic period. Neither found any artifacts from the preceding Epipalaeolithic period so it is understood the site was abandoned in that period and only resettled again during the Neolithic period. The Italian-Israeli expedition noticed two distinct cultures appearing in Abu Zurayq in the Neolithic, one named "Middle Neolithic", beginning in the late 7th or 6th millennium BC and the other called "Late Neolithic", beginning in the 5th millennium BC. The "Late Neolithic" settlement is identified by Garfinkel and Matskevich as part of the Wadi Raba culture. This period is well documented by all three expeditions. This settlement was succeeded by a Chalcolithic settlement in the 4th millennium BC and later by the Early Bronze Age in the 3rd millennium BC, indicating a consecutive settlement sequence.

=== Neolithic and Chalcolithic ===
==== 6th millennium BC ====
The Italian-Israeli expedition has found well-preserved remains of the Neolithic and Chalcolithic periods. The expedition studied three areas and in one of them, 15 settlement phases of these periods were noticed. Emmanuel Anati has divided the findings into two main periods, the "Middle Neolithic" period from the 6th millennium BC and the "Late Neolithic" period of the 5th millennium.

The earliest Neolithic farmers, belonging to the "Middle Neolithic" culture according to Anati, had an advanced culture. Their houses were made of pits dug up to 1.5 meters below the surface. They were roofed with hardened mud mixed with straw. Within these houses, they had campfires and stone installations that stored their various tools. The economy of this settlement was based on various practices such as hunting, fishing, animal husbandry, agriculture and trade. The tools recovered by the excavation were diverse. Flint tools included axes, saws, sickles and others. Among the flint tools were arrow and javelin heads used as weapons. The pottery of this culture was thick and hard, but well fired, a unique phenomenon in the eyes of the excavators. These included simple and large storage and cooking vessels, mostly burnished. The stone objects included millstone, mortar and pestles and weights, probably used for fishing nets. Since little was known about this period, Anati has described this culture as an independent culture.

==== 5th millennium BC (Wadi Rabah culture) ====
In the Italian-Israeli excavations at least eight settlement phases of the "Late Neolithic" culture of the 5th millennium were excavated. These settlers had a more complicated architecture that included well-built walls and plastered or stone-paved floors. Their dwellings were much more permanent than the pit-houses of the previous culture. A large amount of pottery, flint, stone and bone tools were discovered in these layers. The early pottery of this period was mostly painted red. As time progressed, the potters made impressions and incised decorations to their pots. In the later phases of this period, the pottery was lustrous, painted red and black and burnished. Interesting findings from this period are non-local pottery that was acquired by trade. These include pottery of the Yarmukian culture but also pottery that is originated in areas further to the north of the Mediterranean coast such as the Amuq Valley and Mersin, in Cilicia. In the 2002 final report of Perrot's excavation, Yosef Garfinkel and Zinovi Matskevich claim that this "Late Neolithic" culture is actually the Wadi Raba culture.

In Perrot's excavation an area of 70 square meters was excavated and within it, remains of the 5th millennium BC of the Wadi Raba culture were found. The site yielded the remains of stone walls, pebble pavements, pits and installations. Because of the small size of the excavation, these finds did not provide a clear architectural picture, but it is clear that these finds represent more than one settlement phase. The findings indicate a wide variety of practices centered around a single entity, which may have been a single autonomous household that relied on domesticated animals and plants. Evidence for external relations are seen in imported raw materials such as basalt, seashells and obsidian, brought to the site from places close or very far from the site.

The analysis of the findings is based on pottery, stone objects and others. The pottery analysis is based only on complete vessels and definitive potsherds (such as rims, handles and bases). These were mostly found in a certain area of the excavation. They are divided into three different craft levels. A first group, composed of large vessels, is made of unrefined clay, fired at low heat. A second group includes medium-sized vessels that are made of finer clay and were well fired. The last group represents only a small fraction of the findings and was made of well-refined clay which is also rich in carbonates, appearing white. Most of the pottery is decorated, mostly with slipping, painting and impressions. Among the stone objects there were over a hundred tools for a variety of uses including agriculture, wood-making and animal products., Other findings include Sling stones, two figurines, one looks like a dog and the other represents a female, a bone tool used for cutting and polishing, punched seashells and a sandstone painted with ochre.

The salvage 1996 salvage excavation yielded a Wadi Rabah silo, 1 meter deep and 1 meter in diameter, which at some point was used for waste. Next to the silo is a grave with a human skeleton. It seems that before the burial, the thigh bone was removed from the skeleton.

=== Bronze Age ===
Based on Raban's survey, during the Early Bronze Age II-III periods (3rd millennium BC), the first urban period in the land, a settlement with a size of 0.4–1 hectare (4.0–10.0 dunams) used to exist in Abu Zurayq. In the Middle Bronze Age II period (2500-2000 BC), the second urban period in the land, the size of the settlement was approximately 0.8 hectares (8.0 dunams).

South of the unexcavated mound is a burial cave, dug into a soft limestone exposure, with two chambers and a total length of 9 meters. At least ten people were buried in this cave, which is relatively a small number considering that the pottery found in the cave span a time frame of 300 years from the 17th to 14th centuries BC (From the Middle Bronze Age II to the Late Bronze Age II). The initial analysis of the vessels, oil lamps and bronze objects found in the cave revealed that many of the vessels are of Cypriot origin and one is of Mycenaean origin. Late Bronze Age I pottery is absent from the cave and indicates a possible gap in the use of the cave during the LB I period. and the presence of a terracotta figurine of a bird-shaped woman with large pierced ears, a style common in LB II Cyprus. Since it is rare to find such figurine in the Levant, it is likely that it was imported from Cyprus. An isolated Late Bronze Age structure, described as a "farm-house" was also discovered.

== Modern history ==
=== Ottoman period ===
Benvenisti writes that the grave of Abu Zurayq al-Attili, a local Muslim saint from Attil, predated the establishment of the village and gave its name to the site.

In 1878, Abu Zurayq was listed as a spring, not as a populated place. Towards the start of WW I, the first house was built in Abu Zurayq by Samir al-Isa, followed by a second house built during the war by Abd al-Karem Abd al-Shitawi.

=== British period: Arab Turkmen village ===
The war brought an end to the Ottoman period and, after a short period of military administration, the beginning of British Mandatory rule.

The village of Abu Zurayq took shape in those transitional years. Its inhabitants were largely of nomadic Turkmen descent, although by the 20th century, they spoke only Arabic and considered themselves Arabs. They were part of the larger nomadic Turkmen community that lived in the Marj Ibn Amer plain (the Jezreel Valley) and in their transition to a sedentary lifestyle also founded the nearby villages of Abu Shusha, al-Mansi, Ayn al-Mansi, Khirbat Lid, and al-Ghubayya at around the same time Abu Zurayq was founded. Nearly all of Abu Zurayq's residents hailed from the Turkmen Tawhashe clan, although one of the families claimed descent from the village's namesake Abu Zurayq and another claimed Jewish ancestry. There were also four families of African descent in the village, who had either come to the area with the Egyptian army of Ibrahim Pasha in the mid-19th century or were the descendants of African slaves. The Turkmen families also claimed kinship ties with the Beni Sakhr of Transjordan. All of the inhabitants were Sunni Muslims, although in general they were not religious.

In the 1922 census, the population was 301 (142 males and 159 females), all Muslim; increasing in the 1931 census to 361; still all Muslim, in a total of 78 houses.

During the 1936-1939 Arab revolt in Palestine, Abu Zurayq's residents did not participate in the fighting, and most were quietly opposed to the revolt, although there were some sympathizers of the rebels as well. The village mukhtar (headman) was a man named Dahmus in 1937, but he was replaced by Abd al-Khalaq al-Shabash, a pro-rebel mukhtar. A small, simply-constructed mosque was built in Abu Zurayq in 1938. The imam of the mosque was a resident from nearby Umm az-Zinat, but was eventually replaced by an imam from Haifa.

In mid-1937, the population was estimated as 406 Muslims, increasing to 550 Muslims in the 1945 statistics. Abu Zurayq had a total land area of 6,493 Turkish dunams, most of which—4,401 dunams—were privately owned by Arabs; the remainder was public property. Of the land, 4,092 was used for grains, the village's principal crop, 282 for plantations and irrigated land, and one dunam for citrus and bananas. while 2,118 dunams were classified as non-cultivable land. In 1942–43, olive trees occupied roughly 100 dunams of Abu Zurayq's land.

An unspecified area consisted of built-up space. Abu Zurayq contained a number of houses that were dispersed throughout the village and on a nearby hill near the highway between Jenin and Haifa, most of them built at a relative distance from each other. The homes were built of stone and with either concrete rooftops or roofs built of other material such as mud, straw or wood.

=== 1948 Palestine war and destruction ===
Abu Zurayq's residents had traditionally maintained cordial relations with the nearby Jewish kibbutz of HaZorea, including low-level economic cooperation, particularly with regards to agriculture. Arabic language versions of a Jewish labor periodical were regularly distributed in the village. In the lead-up to the 1948 Arab-Israeli War, as part of Jewish efforts to clear the area around Mishmar HaEmek of Palestinian Arabs, on 12 April 1948, Palmach units of the Haganah took over Abu Zurayq. There they took 15 men and 200 women and children into custody, after which they expelled all of the women and children. Demolitions of homes in the village began on the night of its capture and were completed by 15 April. The Filastin newspaper reported that of the 30 homes demolished by Palmach forces, five still contained residents.

According to the account of a Middle East scholar and resident from HaZore'a, Eliezer Bauer, following its capture, Abu Zurayq's men, who were unaffiliated with any Palestinian militia and did not resist the Haganah, "tried to escape and save themselves by fleeing" to nearby fields but were intercepted by armed Jewish residents of nearby kibbutzim and moshavim. After a firefight in which many of the village's men were killed, several survivors surrendered themselves while other unarmed men were taken captive, and the majority of these men were killed. Other men found hiding in the village itself were executed, while houses were looted before being demolished. Bauer's account of events was discussed by the members of HaZorea's kibbutz council where the events surrounding Abu Zurayq's capture were condemned.

Most of the people who managed to escape or were expelled from Abu Zurayq ended up in makeshift camps around Jenin. Along with the expelled residents of other nearby villages they complained to the Arab Higher Committee of their situation, asked for help with humanitarian aid and demanded that Arab forces be sent to avenge their loss and return them to their lands.

=== State of Israel ===
Following the 1948 war, the area was incorporated into the State of Israel, and as of 1992, the land had been left undeveloped and the closest populated place is HaZorea. Much of the village land is used for either agricultural or pastoral purposes. The agricultural land largely consists of cacti, olive and fig trees.

== See also ==
- Village files

== Bibliography ==
- Barron, J.B., ed. (1923). Palestine: Report and General Abstracts of the Census of 1922. Government of Palestine.
- Benveniśtî, M. (2000). Sacred landscape: the buried history of the Holy Land since 1948 (Illustrated ed.). University of California Press. ISBN 0-520-21154-5. (pp. 74–77)
- Flapan, S. "The Palestinian Exodus of 1948" in 16, no. 4 (Sum. 87): 3–26.Simha Flapan records Eliezer Bauer of the HaShomer Hatiz kibbutz and a member of the Mapam Arab Department reporting during a discussion that the villagers of Abu Zrik and Abu Shusha were arrested or driven out and the villages were then destroyed.
- Garfinkel, Y. and Zinovi Matskevich (2002). "Abu Zureiq, a Wadi Rabah Site in the Jezreel Valley: Final Report of the 1962 Excavations". Israel Exploration Journal. 52 (2). Israel Exploration Society: 129–166. JSTOR 27927004.
- Gonen, Rivka (1992). Burial patterns and cultural diversity in late Bronze Age Canaan (Illustrated ed.). EISENBRAUNS. ISBN 978-0-931464-68-3.
- Government of Palestine, Department of Statistics (1945). Village Statistics, April, 1945.
- Hadawi, S. (1970). Village Statistics of 1945: A Classification of Land and Area ownership in Palestine. Palestine Liberation Organization Research Center. Archived from the original on 2018-12-08.
- Khalidi, W. (1992). All That Remains: The Palestinian Villages Occupied and Depopulated by Israel in 1948. Washington D.C.: Institute for Palestine Studies. ISBN 0-88728-224-5.
- Kitchen, K. (1989). "An Early West-Semitic Epigraph on a Scarab from Tell Abu Zureiq?". Israel Exploration Journal. 39 (3/4). Israel Exploration Society: 278–280. JSTOR 27926160.
- Mills, E., ed. (1932). Census of Palestine 1931. Population of Villages, Towns and Administrative Areas. Jerusalem: Government of Palestine.
- Morris, B. (2004). The Birth of the Palestinian Refugee Problem Revisited. Cambridge University Press. ISBN 978-0-521-00967-6.
- Palmer, E.H. (1881). The Survey of Western Palestine: Arabic and English Name Lists Collected During the Survey by Lieutenants Conder and Kitchener, R. E. Transliterated and Explained by E.H. Palmer. Committee of the Palestine Exploration Fund.
- Raban, Avner; Ayala Sussmann (2013). Mishmar HaEmek - 32 (in Hebrew). Israel Antiquities Authority. ISBN 978-965-406-029-5.
  - Tel Zariq
  - Tel Zariq (south)
  - ‘En Zariq
  - Tel Zariq (M)
- Tepper, Y (2013). "Megiddo – Yoqne'am–Megiddo Junctions, Survey (Road 66): Final Report". Hadashot Arkheologiyot: Excavations and Surveys in Israel. 125. Israel Antiquities Authority.
- Yusuf, Muhsin; Anabisa, Ghaleb (2008). "Territorial Awareness In the 1834 Palestinian Revolt". In Roger Heacock (ed.). Les Turkmènes en Palestine: histoire et devenir (in French). Beirut: Presses de l'Ifpo. ISBN 978-2-35159-265-6.
