= Daliyat =

Daliyat is part of the name of the following places:

- Daliyat al-Karmel, Druze town in the Haifa District of Israel
- Daliyat al-Rawha', Palestinian village
