= Khirbat al-Mansura =

Arab village in the Haifa subdistrict, Mandatory Palestine

Khirbat Al-Mansura خربة المنصورة
- Village
- Etymology: Jelamet el Mansûrah, the hill of Mansûreh
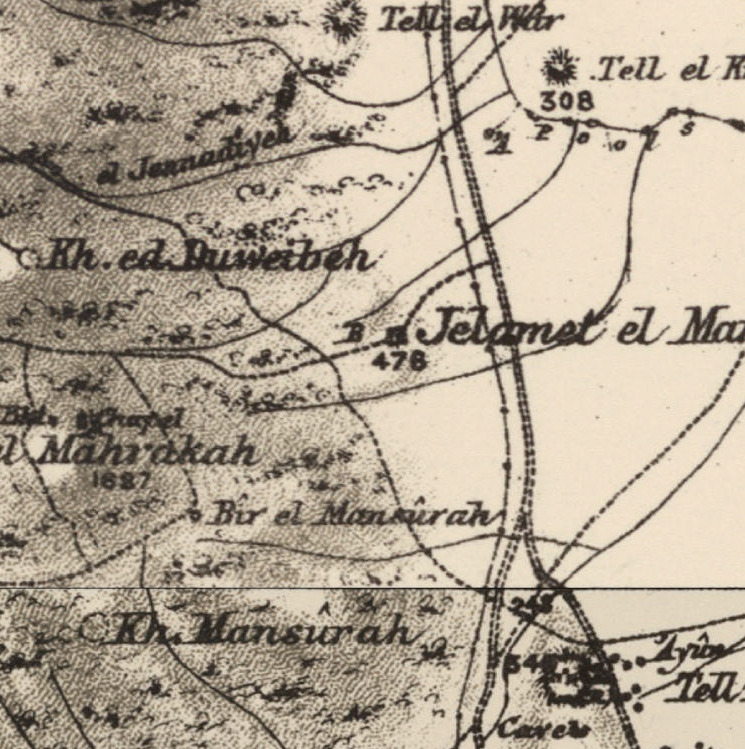
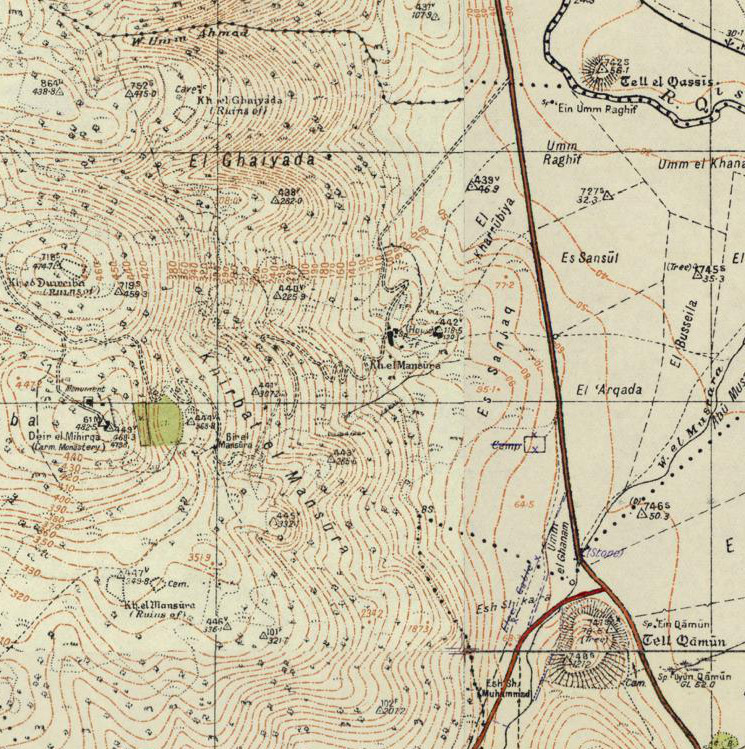
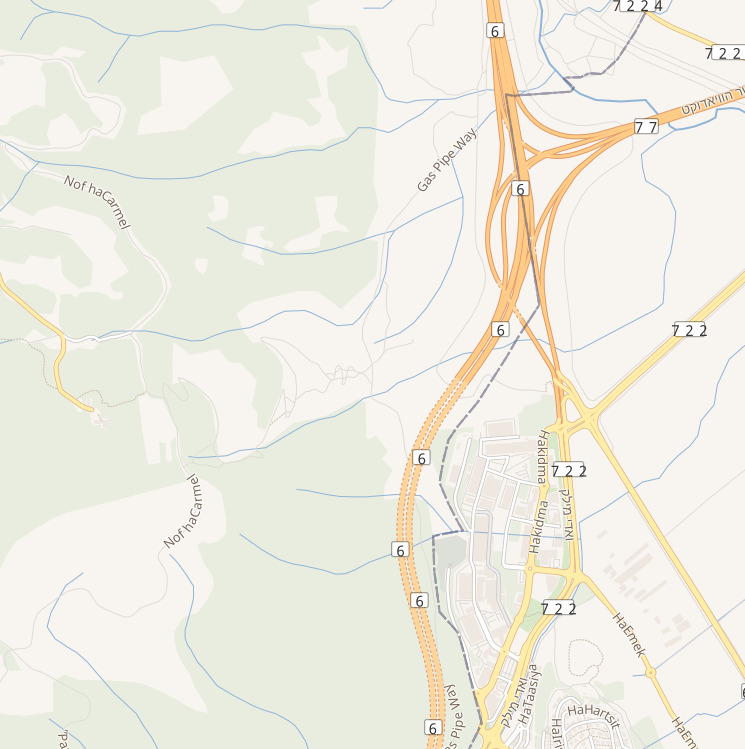
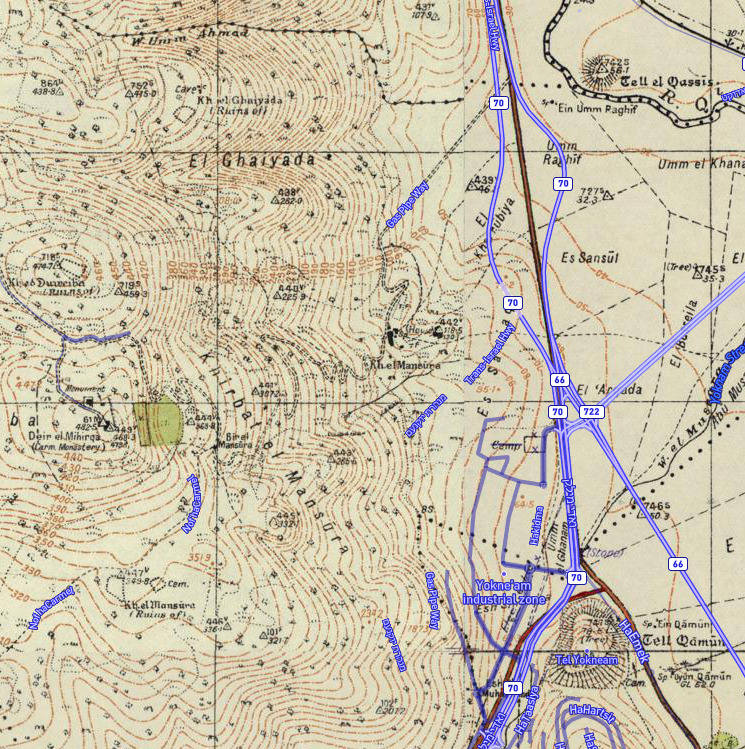
- 1870s map 1940s map modern map 1940s with modern overlay map A series of historical maps of the area around Khirbat al-Mansura (click the buttons)

- Location within Mandatory Palestine
- Coordinates: 32°40′28″N 35°05′59″E
- Palestine grid: 159/231
- Geopolitical entity: Mandatory Palestine
- Subdistrict: Haifa
- Date of depopulation: April 28, 1948

Khirbat Al-Mansura was a Palestinian village in the Haifa Subdistrict. It was probably depopulated during an offensive by the Carmeli Brigade at the end of April 1948. It was located 18.5 km southeast of Haifa with a mostly Druze population. Khirbat Al-Mansura contained the ruins of building foundations and rock-cut tombs.

== History ==
In 1863, the Victor Guérin described El Mansoura as a small Druze village.

In the 1931 census of Palestine it was counted under Daliyat al-Karmel, together with Deir el Muhraqa.

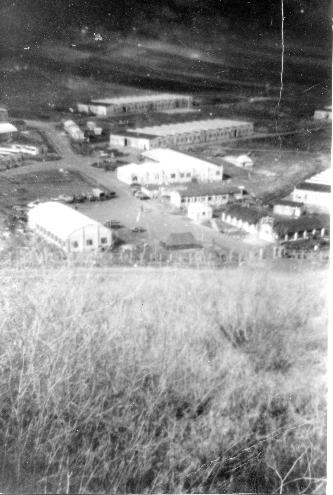
Israeli army camp at Mansura, 1948

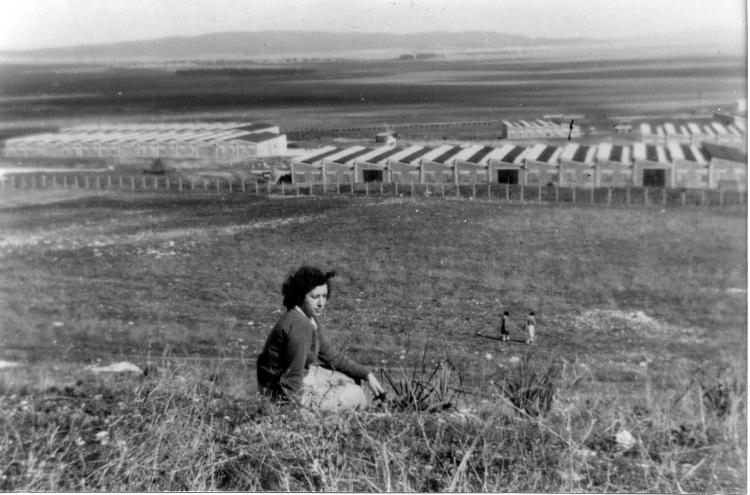
Israeli army camp at Khirbet al-Mansura. 1948

== Bibliography ==
- Guérin, V. (1875). Description Géographique Historique et Archéologique de la Palestine (in French). Vol. 2: Samarie, pt. 2. Paris: L'Imprimerie Nationale.
- Khalidi, W. (1992). All That Remains:The Palestinian Villages Occupied and Depopulated by Israel in 1948. Washington D.C.: Institute for Palestine Studies. ISBN 0-88728-224-5.
- Mills, E., ed. (1932). Census of Palestine 1931. Population of Villages, Towns and Administrative Areas. Jerusalem: Government of Palestine.
- Morris, B. (2004). The Birth of the Palestinian Refugee Problem Revisited. Cambridge University Press. ISBN 978-0-521-00967-6.
- Palmer, E H. (1881). The Survey of Western Palestine: Arabic and English Name Lists Collected During the Survey by Lieutenants Conder and Kitchener, R. E. Transliterated and Explained by E.H. Palmer. Committee of the Palestine Exploration Fund.
