= Wa'arat al-Sarris =

Wa'arat al-Sarris وعرة السرّيس
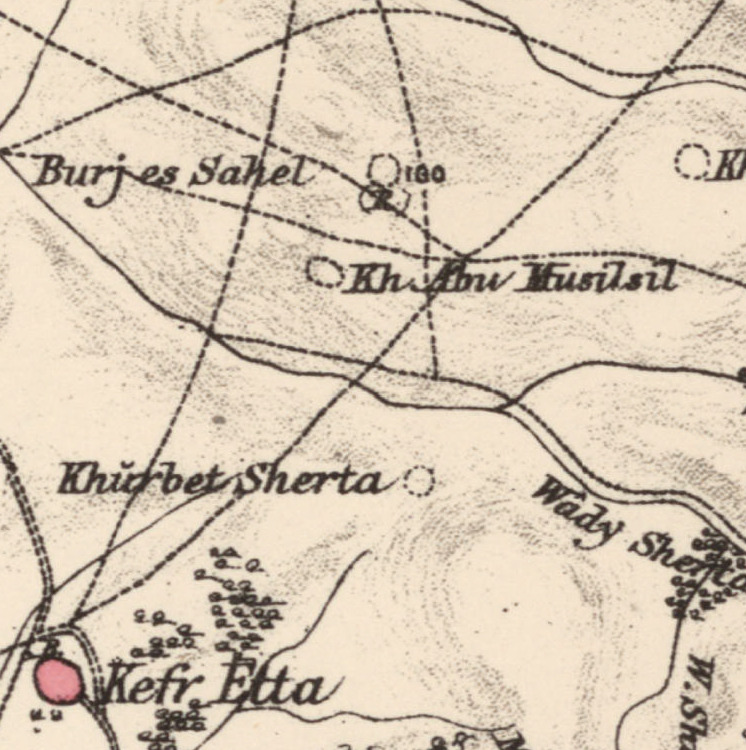
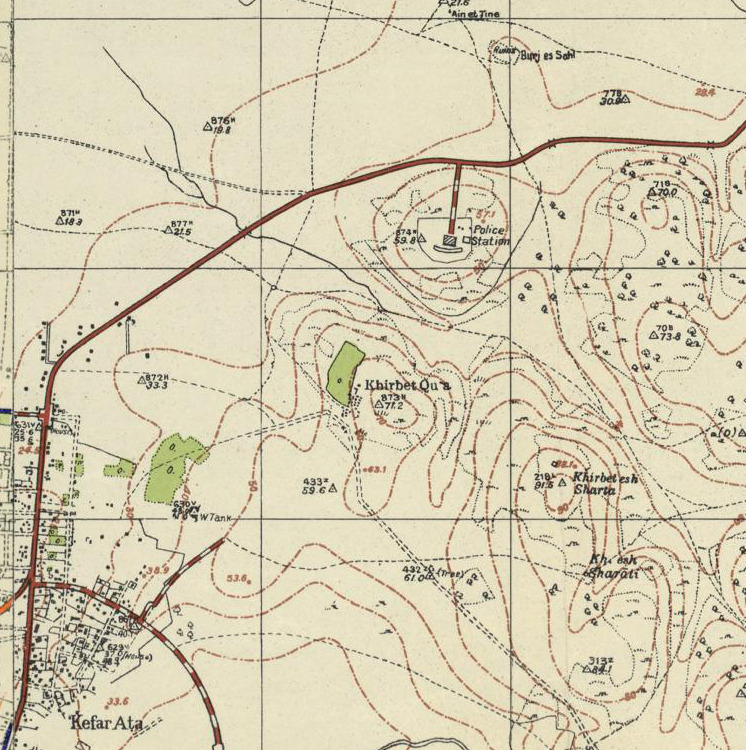
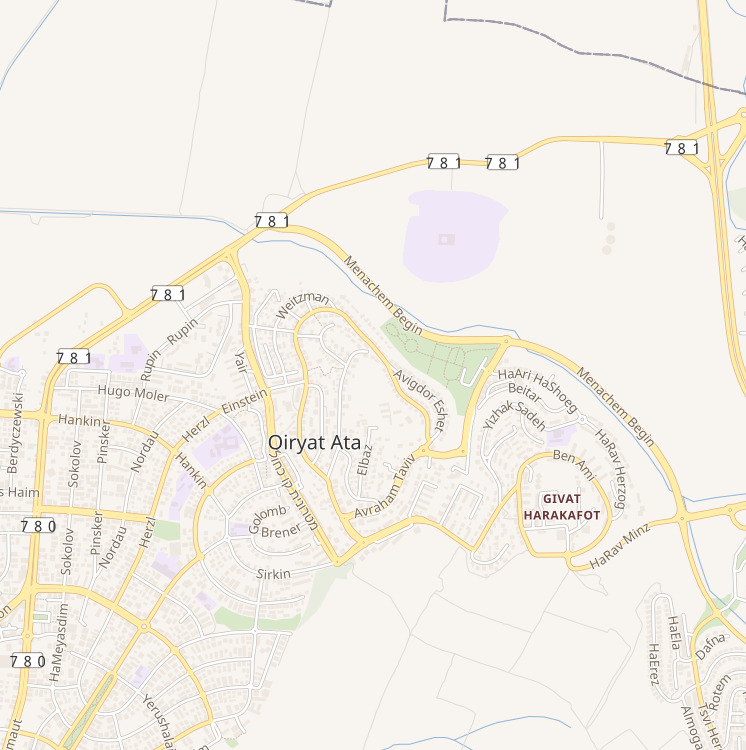
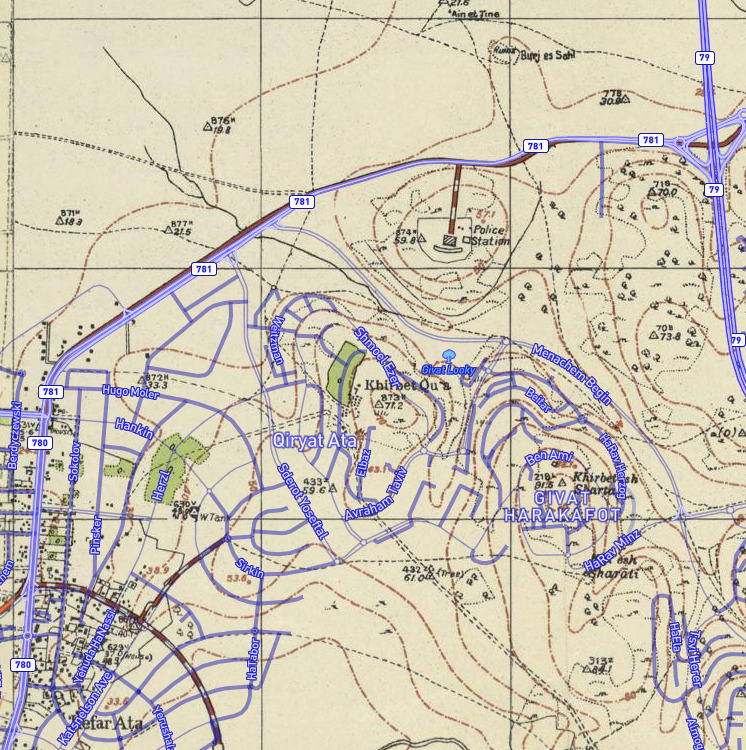
- 1870s map 1940s map modern map 1940s with modern overlay map A series of historical maps of the area around Wa'arat al-Sarris (click the buttons)

- Location within Mandatory Palestine
- Coordinates: 32°48′50″N 35°07′08″E
- Palestine grid: 161/245
- Geopolitical entity: Mandatory Palestine
- Subdistrict: Haifa
- Date of depopulation: unknown

Population (1945)
  - Total: 190

Wa'arat al-Sarris (Arabic: وعرة السرّيس) was a Palestinian village in the Haifa Subdistrict, which was depopulated during the 1948 Palestine war.

== History ==
In the 1931 census of Palestine, conducted by the British Mandate authorities, it was counted as a part of Shefa-'Amr suburbs, together with 9 other villages, and together they had a total of 1197 inhabitants, all Muslim, in 234 houses.

In the 1945 statistics Wa'rit Sarris was again counted among Shefa-'Amr suburbs, and it was noted with a population of 190 Muslims.

=== 1948, aftermath ===
During the 1947–1948 Civil War in Mandatory Palestine, there were raids on Arab villages by Jewish forces, which led to flight of the residents and in early January 1948 Hans Moller, the manager of the Ata factory (in modern-day Kiryat Ata) offered the residents of the village to find shelter in his factory, which was near the village, but the residents declined the offer, in fear of being targeted by the Palestinian Arabs and fled to Shefa-'Amr. The village was occupied during April, 1948, during the Battle of Ramat Yohanan between the Jews and the Druze battalion of the Arab Liberation Army. The village was located 11 km east of Haifa.

== Bibliography ==
- Government of Palestine, Department of Statistics (1945). Village Statistics, April, 1945.
- Hadawi, S. (1970). Village Statistics of 1945: A Classification of Land and Area ownership in Palestine. Palestine Liberation Organization Research Center.
- Khalidi, W. (1992). All That Remains: The Palestinian Villages Occupied and Depopulated by Israel in 1948. Washington D.C.: Institute for Palestine Studies. ISBN 0-88728-224-5.
- Mills, E., ed. (1932). Census of Palestine 1931. Population of Villages, Towns and Administrative Areas. Jerusalem: Government of Palestine.
- Morris, B. (2004). The Birth of the Palestinian Refugee Problem Revisited. Cambridge University Press. ISBN 978-0-521-00967-6.
