= Burayka =

Burayka بريكة Bureika, Ibraikeh
- Village
- Etymology: The little pool
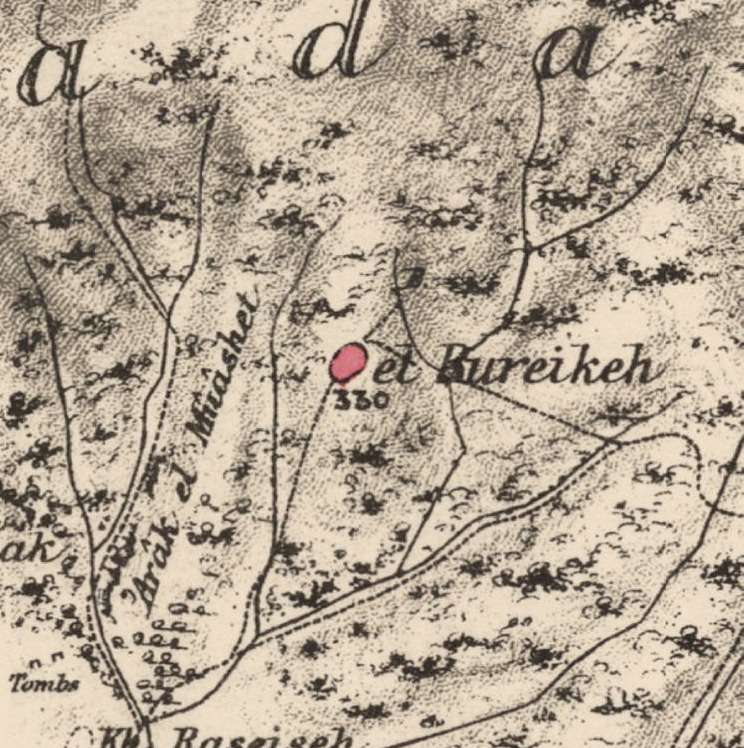
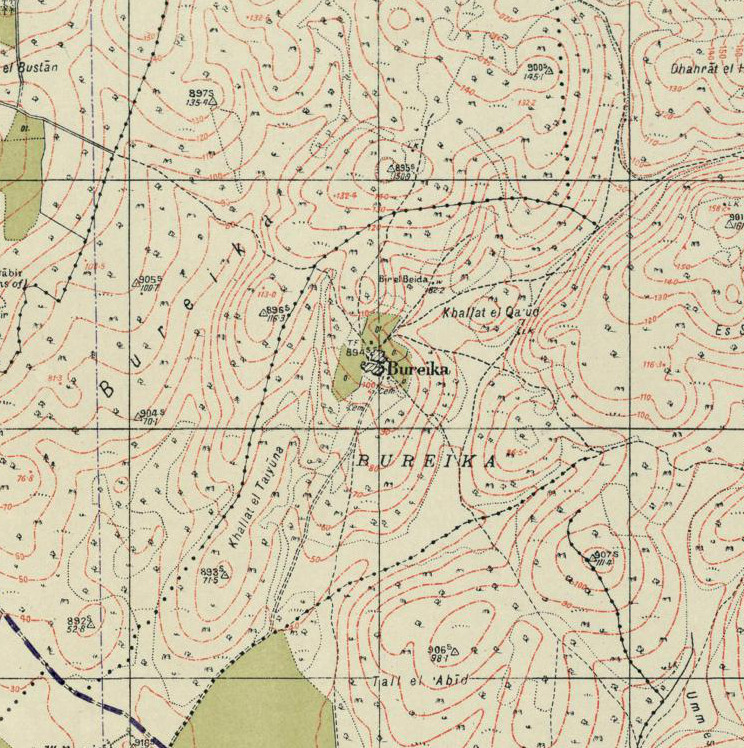
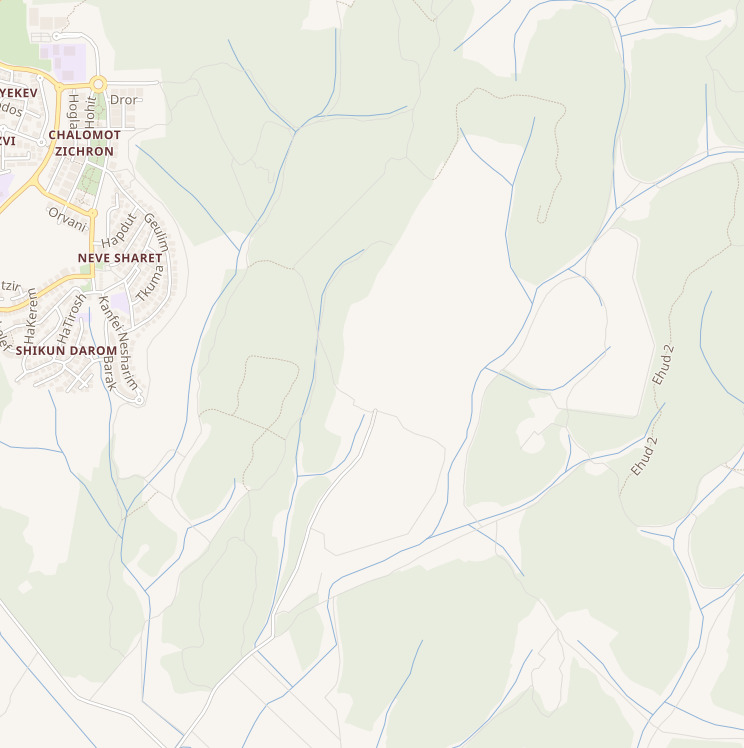
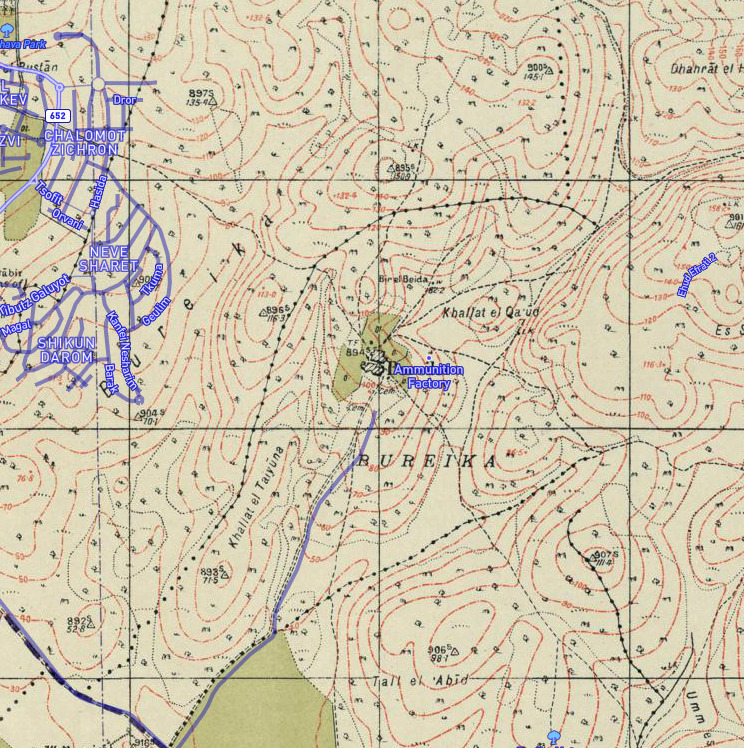
- 1870s map 1940s map modern map 1940s with modern overlay map A series of historical maps of the area around Burayka (click the buttons)

- Location within Mandatory Palestine
- Coordinates: 32°33′29″N 34°58′32″E
- Palestine grid: 148/213
- Geopolitical entity: Mandatory Palestine
- Subdistrict: Haifa
- Date of depopulation: May 5, 1948

Area
  - Total: 11,434 dunams (11.434 km^{2}; 4.415 sq mi)

Population (1945)
  - Total: 290
- Cause(s) of depopulation: Influence of nearby town's fall

Burayka was a Palestinian Arab village in the Haifa Subdistrict. It was depopulated during the 1947–1948 Civil War in Mandatory Palestine on May 5, 1948. It was located 29 km south of Haifa.

== History ==
The Crusaders called the place for Broiquet. In 1265, Burayka was among the villages and estates sultan Baibars allocated to his amirs after he had expelled the Crusaders. Half of the income from Burayka went to his emir Jamal al-Din Musa b. Yaghmur, the other half to emir 'Alam al-Din Sanjar al-Hilli al-Ghazzawi.

=== Ottoman era ===
In 1882, the PEF's Survey of Western Palestine (SWP) described it as "a small village on a hill-top, with a well to the north, and wooded country round." A population list from about 1887 showed that Bureikeh had about 115 inhabitants, all Muslim. A school, founded in 1889 during the Ottoman period, was located in the village, but was closed during the British Mandate period.

=== British Mandate era ===
In the 1922 census of Palestine, conducted by the British Mandate authorities, Ibraikeh had a population of 249, all Muslims, increasing in the 1931 census to 237, still all Muslims, in 45 houses.

In the 1945 statistics the village had a population of 290 Muslims, and a land area of 11,434 dunams. Of this, Arabs had a total of 1,864 dunams (16 percent), and 78 dunams were for plantations and irrigable land, 1,538 for cereals, and 15 dunams were built-up (urban) land. Meanwhile, 9,384 dunams (82 percent) were owned by Jews.

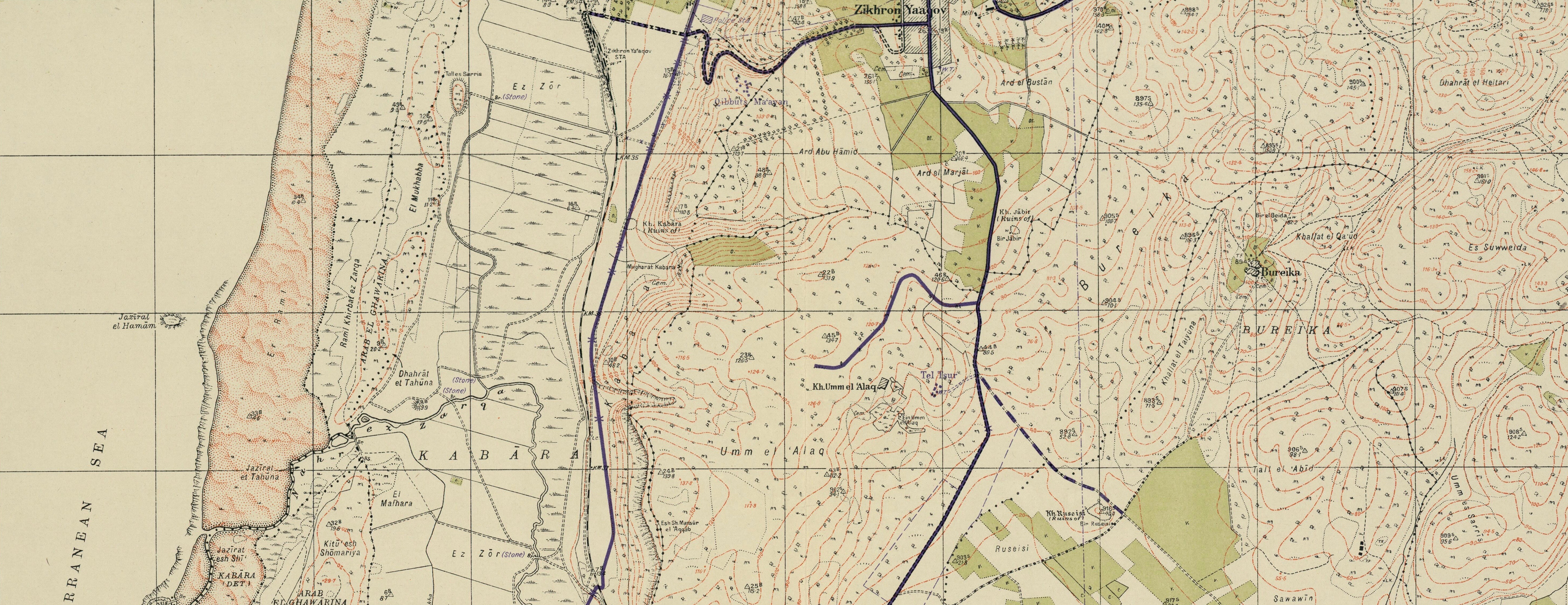
Burayka 1945 1:20,000

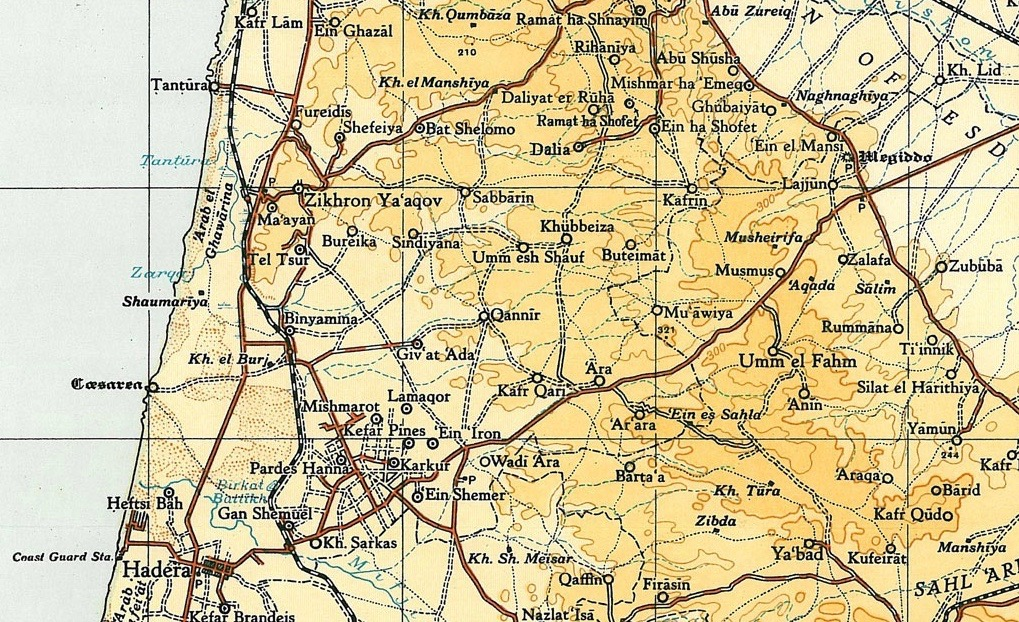
Burayka 1945 1:250,000

=== 1948, aftermath ===
Initially, the villagers did not want to take part in the war, and they opposed garrisoning ALA militiamen in their village.

According to Yishuv sources, the AHC had in early March, 1948, ordered the villagers to evacuate, so that it could serve as a base for Arab irregular forces, However, most of the villagers seems to have stayed in the village at this stage. The village was finally depopulated in early May, in the aftermath of the Battle of Mishmar HaEmek, when IZL attacked the remaining villages in the area with mortar fire.

Today, a civilian explosives factory is located on the site.

== Bibliography ==
- Barron, J.B., ed. (1923). Palestine: Report and General Abstracts of the Census of 1922. Government of Palestine.
- Conder, C.R.; Kitchener, H.H. (1882). The Survey of Western Palestine: Memoirs of the Topography, Orography, Hydrography, and Archaeology. Vol. 2. London: Committee of the Palestine Exploration Fund.
- Department of Statistics (1945). Village Statistics, April, 1945. Government of Palestine.
- Hadawi, S. (1970). "Village Statistics of 1945: A Classification of Land and Area ownership in Palestine". Palestine Liberation Organization Research Center.
- Ibn al-Furat (1971). Jonathan Riley-Smith (ed.). Ayyubids, Mamluks and Crusaders: Selections from the "Tarikh Al-duwal Wal-muluk" of Ibn Al-Furat : the Text, the Translation. Vol. 2. Translation by Malcolm Cameron Lyons, Ursula Lyons. Cambridge: W. Heffer.
- Khalidi, W. (1992). All That Remains: The Palestinian Villages Occupied and Depopulated by Israel in 1948. Washington D.C.: Institute for Palestine Studies. ISBN 0-88728-224-5.
- Mills, E., ed. (1932). Census of Palestine 1931. Population of Villages, Towns and Administrative Areas. Jerusalem: Government of Palestine.
- Morris, B. (2004). The Birth of the Palestinian Refugee Problem Revisited. Cambridge University Press. ISBN 978-0-521-00967-6.
- Palmer, E.H. (1881). The Survey of Western Palestine: Arabic and English Name Lists Collected During the Survey by Lieutenants Conder and Kitchener, R. E. Transliterated and Explained by E.H. Palmer. Committee of the Palestine Exploration Fund.
- Schumacher, G. (1888). "Population list of the Liwa of Akka". Quarterly Statement - Palestine Exploration Fund. 20: 169–191.
