= Khirbat Sa'sa' =

Village in Haifa Subdistrict, Mandatory Palestine

Khirbat Sa'sa' خربة سعْسع
- Village
- Etymology: Kh. Sảsả, the ruin of Sảsả
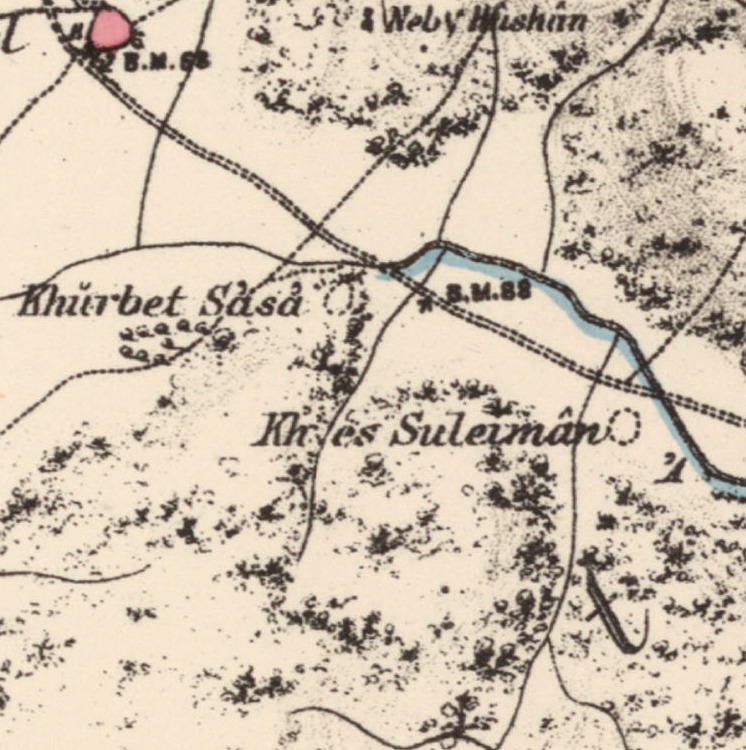
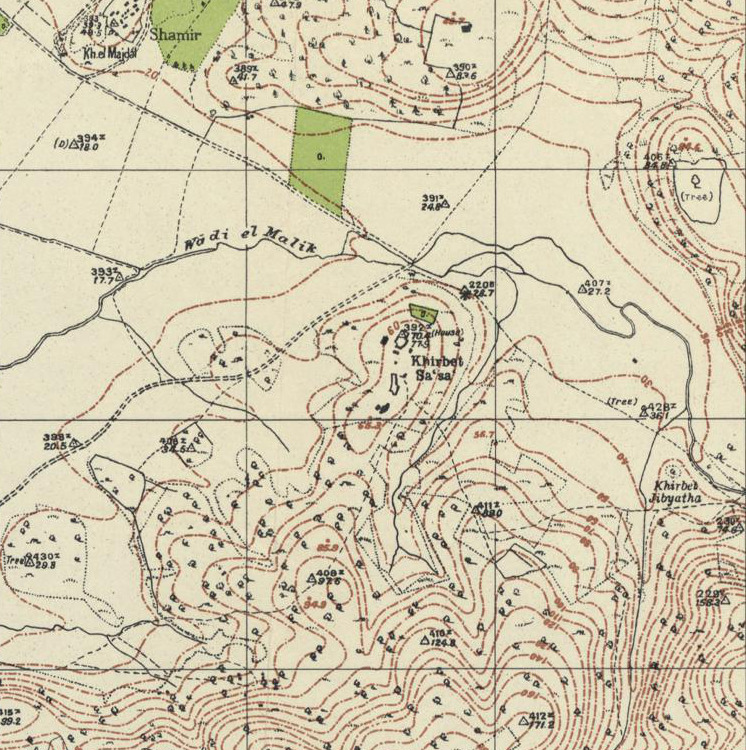
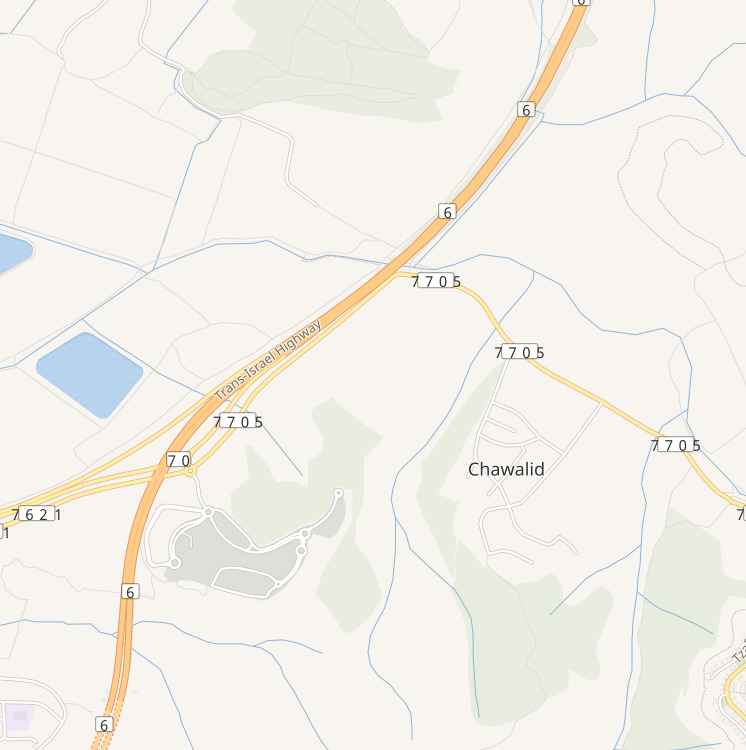
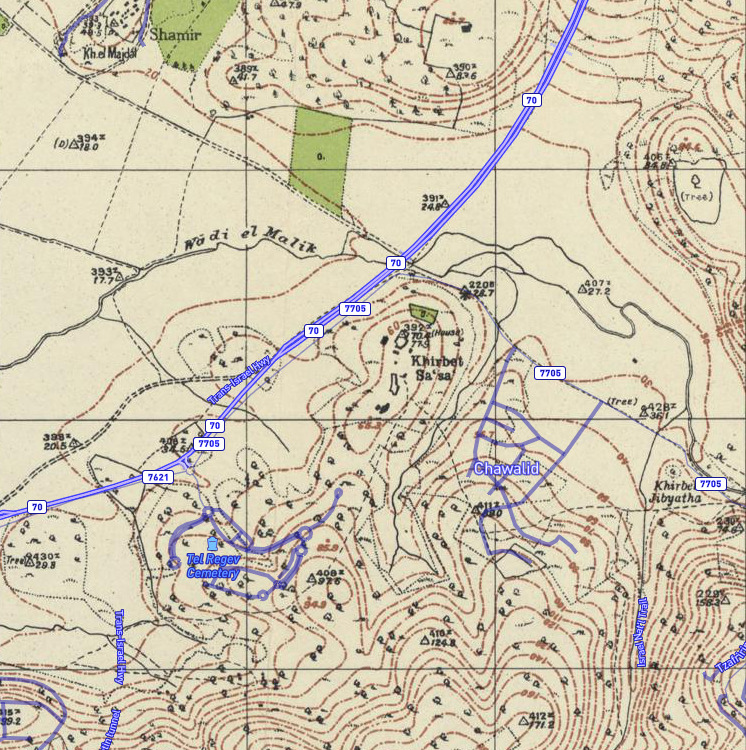
- 1870s map 1940s map modern map 1940s with modern overlay map A series of historical maps of the area around Khirbat Sa'sa' (click the buttons)

- Location within Mandatory Palestine
- Coordinates: 32°46′27″N 35°07′49″E
- Palestine grid: 162/242
- Geopolitical entity: Mandatory Palestine
- Subdistrict: Haifa
- Date of depopulation: April 28, 1948

Population (1945)
  - Total: 130

Khirbat Sa'sa' was a Palestinian Arab village in the Haifa Subdistrict. It was depopulated during the 1947–1948 Civil War in Mandatory Palestine on April 28, 1948. It was located 15 km east of Haifa.

== History ==
The Romans referred to the village as Kefar Sasai.

In 1881, the PEF's Survey of Western Palestine found at Kh. Sasa: "caves and foundations".

=== British Mandate era ===
In the 1931 census of Palestine, conducted by the British Mandate authorities, it was counted as a part of Shefa-'Amr suburbs, together with 9 other villages, and together they had a total of 1197 inhabitants, all Muslim, in 234 houses.

In the 1945 statistics Sasa was again counted among Shefa-'Amr suburbs, and it was noted with a population of 130 Muslims.

=== Post 1948 ===
In 1992 the village site was described: "Cactuses and fig trees can be found scattered about the site. There are a number of partially collapsed stone walls, one with a large arched opening. The surrounding lands are used as a grazing area." Village ruins include building foundations, tombs, and cisterns.

== Bibliography ==
- Department of Statistics (1945). Village Statistics, April, 1945. Government of Palestine.
- Conder, C.R.; Kitchener, H. H. (1881). The Survey of Western Palestine: Memoirs of the Topography, Orography, Hydrography, and Archaeology. Vol. 1. London: Committee of the Palestine Exploration Fund.
- Hadawi, S. (1970). Village Statistics of 1945: A Classification of Land and Area ownership in Palestine. Palestine Liberation Organization Research Center. Archived from the original on 2018-12-08.
- Khalidi, W. (1992). All That Remains: The Palestinian Villages Occupied and Depopulated by Israel in 1948. Washington D.C.: Institute for Palestine Studies. ISBN 0-88728-224-5.
- Mills, E., ed. (1932). Census of Palestine 1931. Population of Villages, Towns and Administrative Areas. Jerusalem: Government of Palestine.
- Palmer, E. H. (1881). The Survey of Western Palestine: Arabic and English Name Lists Collected During the Survey by Lieutenants Conder and Kitchener, R. E. Transliterated and Explained by E.H. Palmer. Committee of the Palestine Exploration Fund.
