= Khirbat Lid =

Lid خربة لِد العوادين Khirbet Lid al Awadin
- Village
- Etymology: From personal name
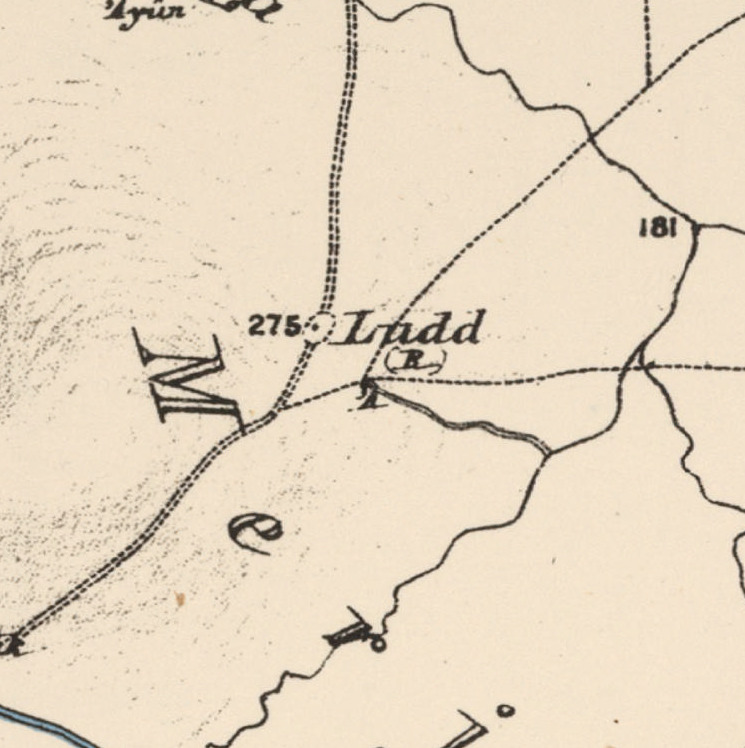
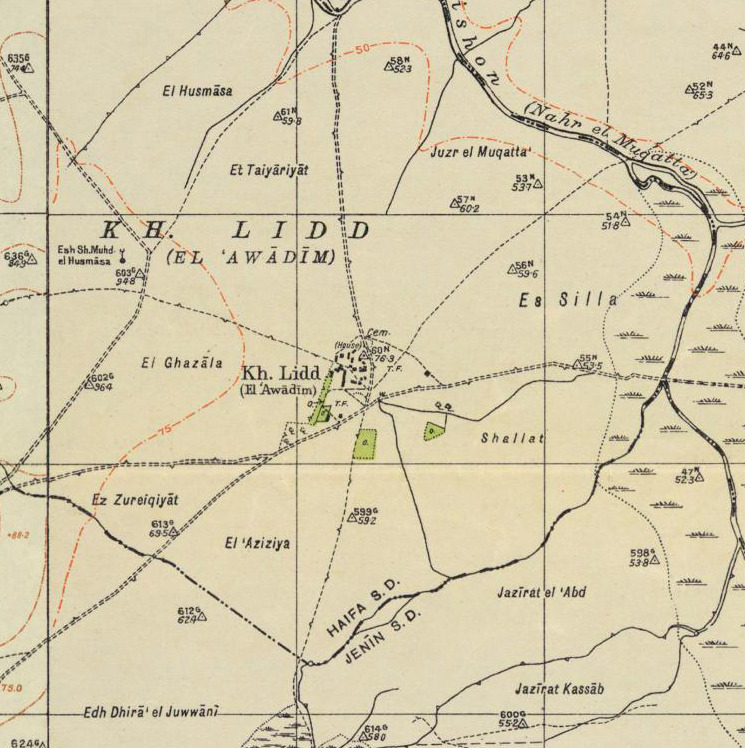
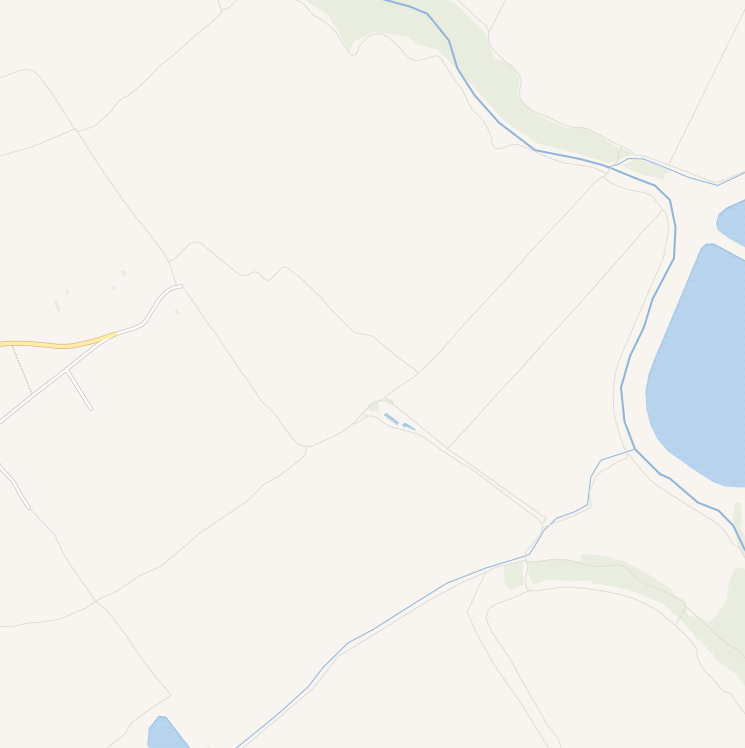
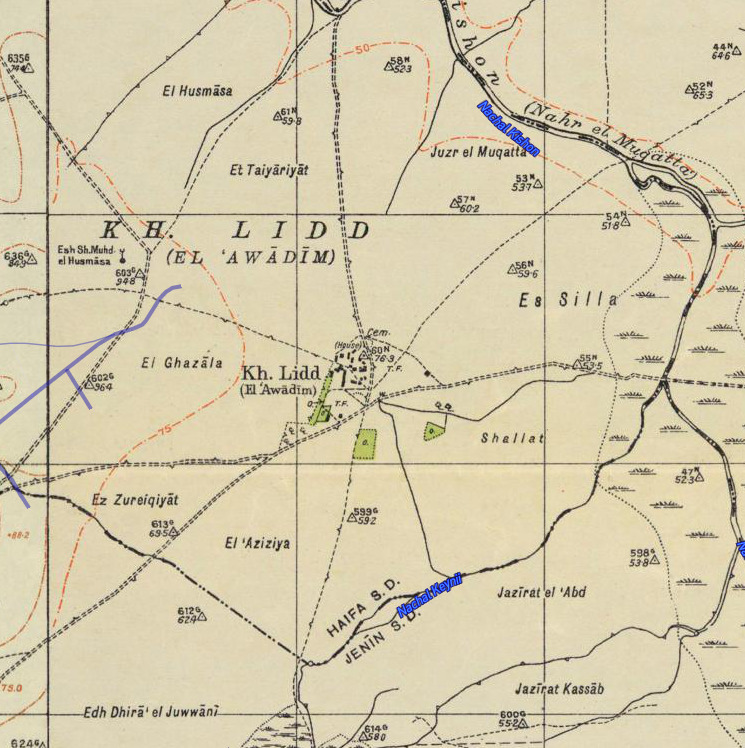
- 1870s map 1940s map modern map 1940s with modern overlay map A series of historical maps of the area around Khirbat Lid (click the buttons)

- Location within Mandatory Palestine
- Coordinates: 32°36′49″N 35°13′27″E
- Palestine grid: 171/224
- Geopolitical entity: Mandatory Palestine
- Subdistrict: Haifa
- Date of depopulation: Not known

Population (1945)
  - Total: 640
- Current Localities: HaYogev

Lid was a Palestinian village in the Haifa Subdistrict. It was depopulated during the 1948 Arab–Israeli War on April 9, 1948. It was 32 km southeast of Haifa.

== History ==
The Khirbat al-Manatir contained artifacts from the Byzantine period.

=== Ottoman era ===
In 1881, the PEF's Survey of Western Palestine (SWP) found "traces of ruins, with a pillar-shaft near a spring" at Lid.

While surveying for the construction of the Jezreel Valley railway, Gottlieb Schumacher noted in 1900 that Lid was a "flourishing village" of 46 huts and 200 inhabitants, built up by the Bedouin of the Merj.

=== British Mandate era ===
In the 1922 census of Palestine conducted by the British Mandate authorities, the tribal area of Al Awadein had a population of 402 Muslims, increasing in the 1931 census to 451, in 87 houses. In the 1945 statistics it had a population of 640 Muslims, and the total area was 13,572 dunams. Of the land, 103 dunams were used for plantations and irrigable land, 13,063 for cereals, and 52 were built-up (urban) areas.

In addition to agriculture, residents practiced animal husbandry, an important source of income for the town. In 1943, they owned 480 heads of cattle, 612 sheep over a year old, 125 goats over a year old, 36 camels, 16 horses, 39 donkeys, 2890 birds, and 650 pigs.

=== 1948 and aftermath ===
A Jewish force infiltrated Lid on the evening of 26 February 1948, in the early weeks of the war. According to an account of the raid published in the Palestinian daily Filastin, villagers fired heavily on the attackers, driving them back after a brief skirmish. No casualties were reported. While no explicit account of the occupation of Lid is available, it is possible that, given its location, it may have been one of the villages captured in the aftermath of the Battle of Mishmar ha-Emeq. All the villages occupied during the operation were almost immediately destroyed by the Jewish forces as part of the Nakba. A remoter possibility is that it was occupied during the Israeli army's Operation Dekel.

After the war the area was incorporated into the State of Israel. The moshav of HaYogev was established in 1949, west of the village site and partly on village land.

In 1992 the village site was described as "Piles of stones, scattered across the ground near several large eucalyptus and olive trees, are all that remain of the village. There is a newly-built structure over the village well."

== Bibliography ==
- Barron, J.B., ed. (1923). Palestine: Report and General Abstracts of the Census of 1922. Government of Palestine.
- Conder, C.R.; Kitchener, H.H. (1881). The Survey of Western Palestine: Memoirs of the Topography, Orography, Hydrography, and Archaeology. Vol. 1. London: Committee of the Palestine Exploration Fund.
- Department of Statistics (1945). Village Statistics, April, 1945. Government of Palestine.
- Hadawi, S. (1970). Village Statistics of 1945: A Classification of Land and Area ownership in Palestine. Palestine Liberation Organization Research Center. Archived from the original on 2018-12-08.
- Khalidi, W. (1992). All That Remains: The Palestinian Villages Occupied and Depopulated by Israel in 1948. Washington D.C.: Institute for Palestine Studies. ISBN 0-88728-224-5.
- Mills, E., ed. (1932). Census of Palestine 1931. Population of Villages, Towns and Administrative Areas. Jerusalem: Government of Palestine.
- Morris, B. (2004). The Birth of the Palestinian Refugee Problem Revisited. Cambridge University Press. ISBN 978-0-521-00967-6.
- Palmer, E.H. (1881). The Survey of Western Palestine: Arabic and English Name Lists Collected During the Survey by Lieutenants Conder and Kitchener, R. E. Transliterated and Explained by E.H. Palmer. Committee of the Palestine Exploration Fund.
- Schumacher, G. (1900). "Reports from Galilee". Quarterly Statement - Palestine Exploration Fund. 32 (4): 355–360. doi:10.1179/peq.1900.32.4.355.
