= Ka'abiyye-Tabbash-Hajajre =

Ka'abiyye-Tabash-Hajajre: כַּעְבִּיָּה-טַבָּאשׁ-חַגָ'גְ'רָה; كعبية طباش الحجاجرة
- Local council (from 1996)

Hebrew transcription(s)
  - ISO 259: Kaˁbíya - Ṭabašh - Ḥaǧaǧra
  - Translit.: Ka'abiya-Tabash-Hajajra
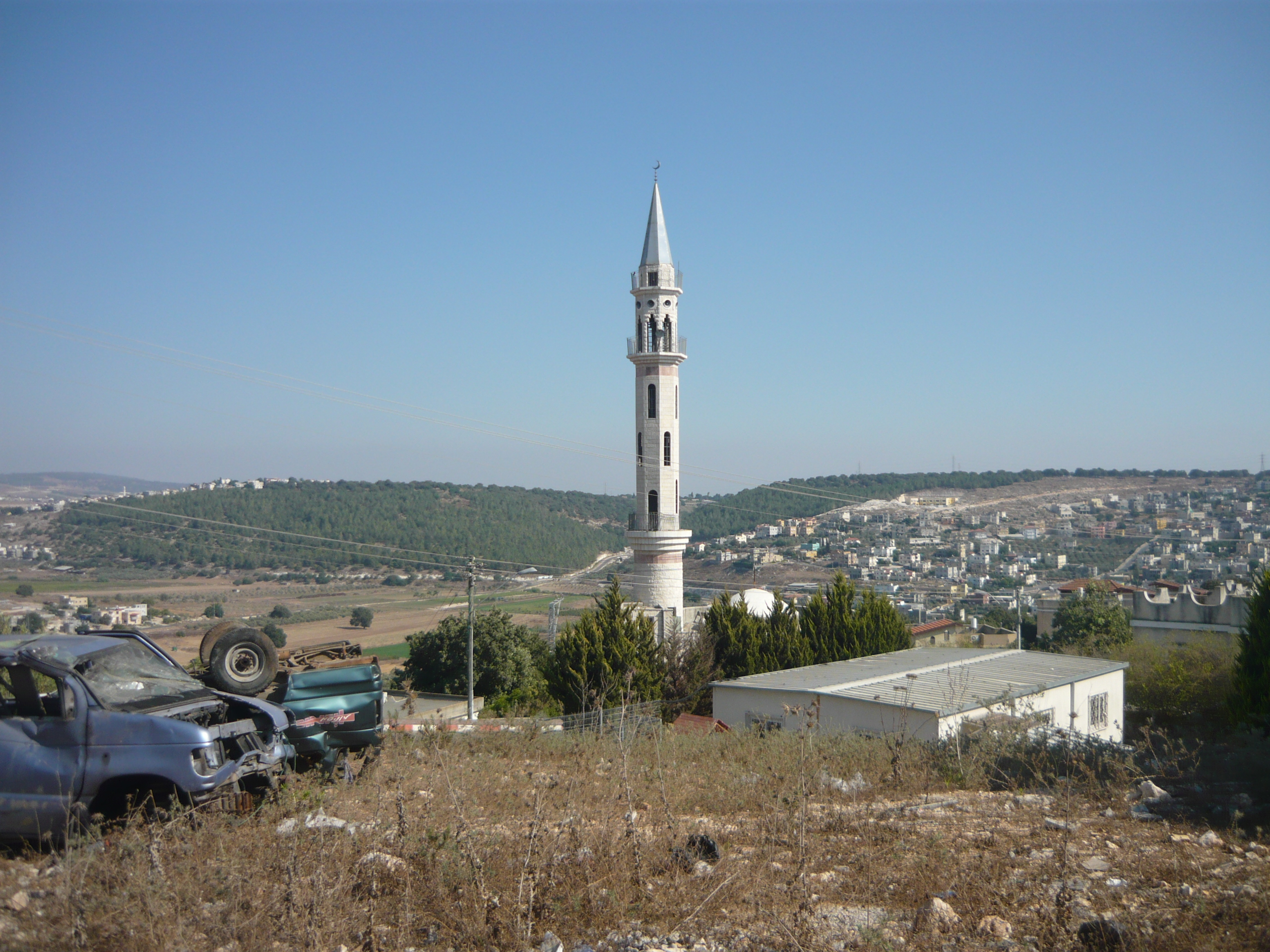

- Location within Haifa region of Israel
- Coordinates: 32°44′58″N 35°11′1″E
- Country: Israel
- District: Northern
- Subdistrict: Jezreel
- Natural Region: Nazareth-Tir'an Mountains

Government
  - Head of Municipality: Yaser Tabash

Area
  - Total: 1,653 dunams (1.653 km^{2}; 0.638 sq mi)

Population (2024)
  - Total: 6,545
  - Density: 3,959/km^{2} (10,250/sq mi)

Ka'abiyye-Tabbash-Hajajre is an Arab local council in the Northern District of Israel. It was declared as a local council in 1996. In 2024 it had a population of 6,545, the majority of whom are Muslims.

== Geography ==
Ka'abiyye-Tabbash-Hajajre is located in the Lower Galilee region of Israel, in the Jezreel Subdistrict of the Northern District. It is south of Shefa-Amr and northwest of Nazareth.

== Voting Patterns ==
In the 2026 election, 92 percent of voters in Ka'abiyye-Tabbash-Hajajre voted for the Arab parties, while 6 percent voted for the parties of the center-left coalition led by Gadi Eisenkot and 1 percent voted for the parties of the right-wing coalition led by Benjamin Netanyahu. Among the voters for the Arab parties, 80 percent voted for Ra'am, while 20 percent voted for the Joint List. Voter turnout increased 61 percent from the 2022 election.

== See also ==
- Arab localities in Israel
