= Al-Mansi =

Former Palestinian village

Al-Mansi المنسي 'Arab Baniha
- Village
- Etymology: The forgotten
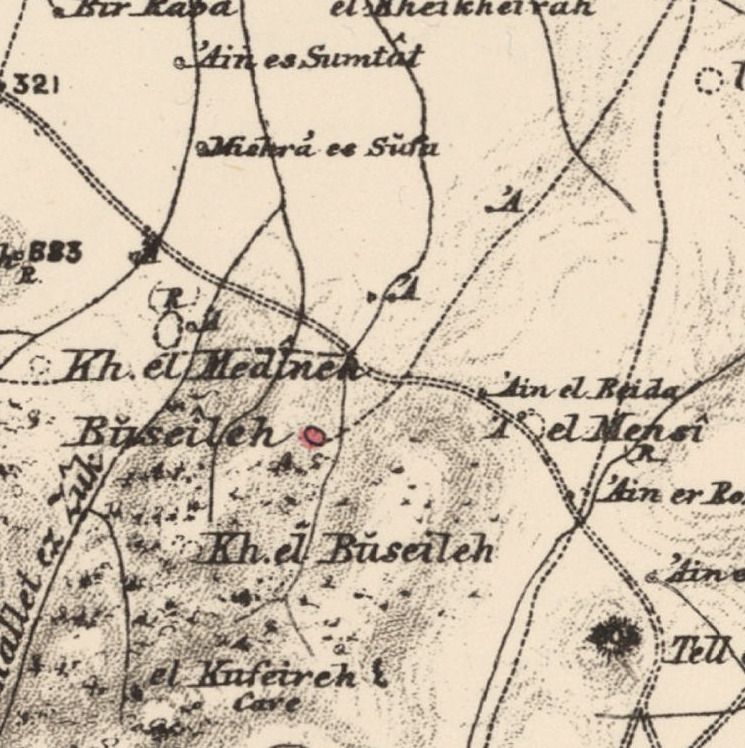
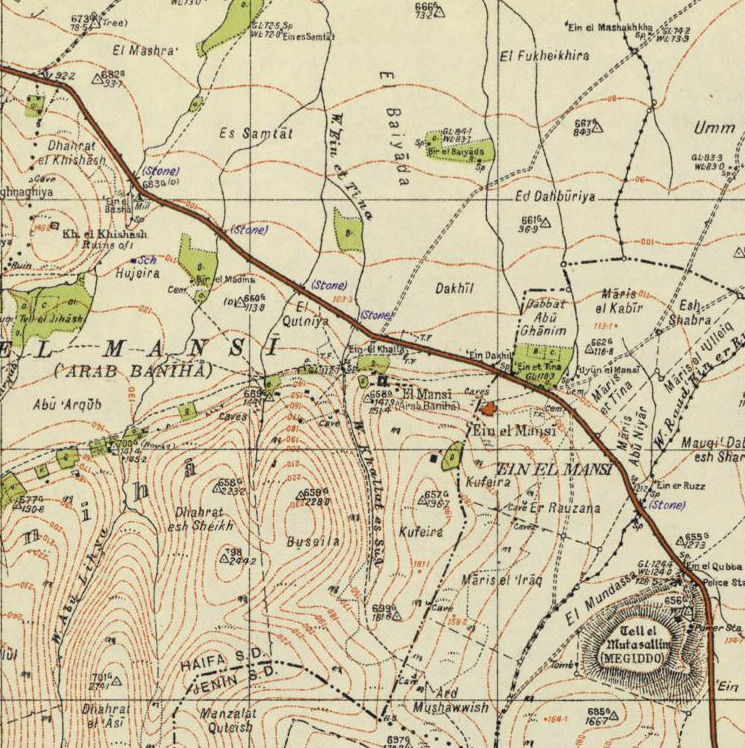
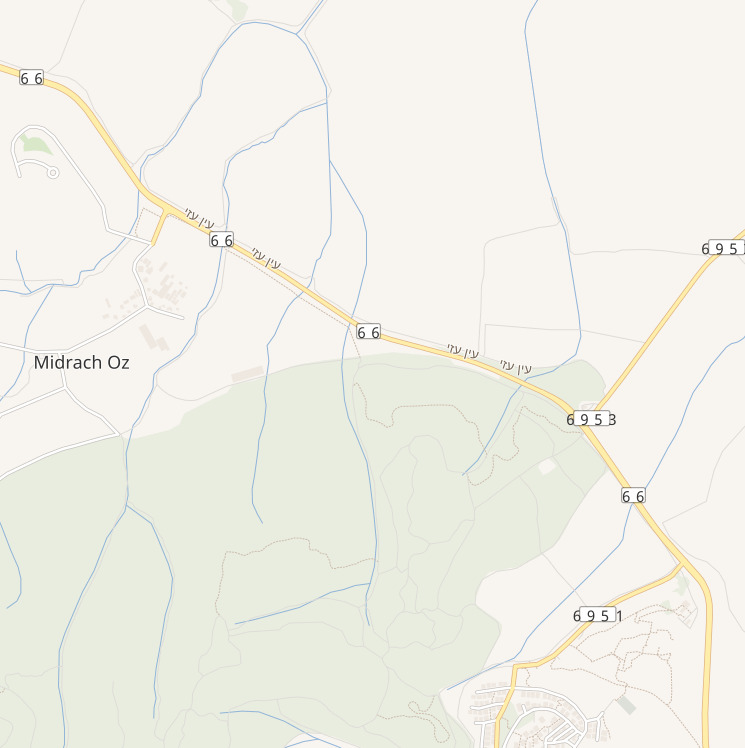
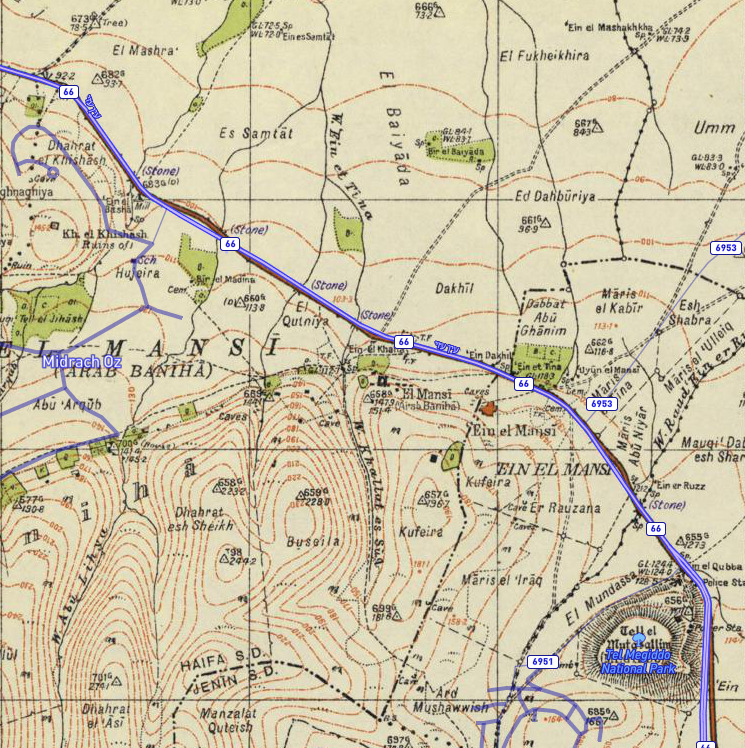
- 1870s map 1940s map modern map 1940s with modern overlay map A series of historical maps of the area around Al-Mansi (click the buttons)

- Location within Mandatory Palestine
- Coordinates: 32°35′42″N 35°10′22″E
- Palestine grid: 166/222
- Geopolitical entity: Mandatory Palestine
- Subdistrict: Haifa
- Date of depopulation: 12–13 April 1948

Area
  - Total: 12.3 km^{2} (4.7 sq mi)

Population (1944/45)
  - Total: 1,200
- Cause(s) of depopulation: Military assault by Yishuv forces
- Current Localities: Midrakh Oz

Al-Mansi (Arabic: المنسي, also called 'Arab Baniha Arabic: عرب بنيها) was a Palestinian village in the Haifa Subdistrict. It was occupied on 12 April 1948 by Israeli troops during the Battle of Mishmar HaEmek. The village was inhabited by Turkmens.

== Geography ==
Al-Mansi is located on the western side of Marj Ibn 'Amer (Jezreel Valley), and is 30 km southeast of Haifa city. It is situated at an elevation of 125 meters above sea level. The total land area is (12,272 Dunums;12,272,000 m²).

== History ==
In 1882 the PEF's Survey of Western Palestine described it as "a small ruined village, with springs".

=== British Mandate era ===
In the 1922 census of Palestine conducted by the British Mandate authorities, Al-Mansi had a population 72; 68 Muslims and 4 Christians, where the Christians were Roman Catholics. This had increased in the 1931 census to 467; 461 Muslims and 6 Christians, in a total of 98 houses.

In the 1945 statistics, al-Mansi had 292 houses, most constructed from stone. It had one elementary school, a mosque and a mill. The land used to be planted with olives, cereals and vegetable. Al-Mansi had six springs in its vicinity which supplied it with drinking water. In 1945, it had a population of 1,200 inhabitants; 1,180 Muslims and 20 Christians, and the total land area was 12,272 dunams. Of the land, Arabs used 1,391 dunams for plantations and irrigable land, 6,559 for grains, while 17 dunams were built-up (urban) areas.

In addition to agriculture, residents practiced animal husbandry which formed was an important source of income for the town. In 1943, they owned 1254 heads of cattle, 995 sheep over a year old, 503 goats over a year old, 54 camels, 64 horses, 3 mules, 307 donkeys, 3298 fowls, and 112 pigeons.

=== 1948 War and aftermath ===
On 9 April 1948, Golani troops informed their headquarter that "Our forces are fighting in...Mansi...We are preparing to destroy the villages when we evacuate them". The newspaper Filastin reported that Zionist forces had infiltrated al-Mansi on 9 April, resulting in an exchange of fire with the village's defenders.

According to Fawzi al-Qawuqji, the Arab Liberation Army forces withdrew to al-Mansi on 11 April, after a "violent" counter-attack.

On 12 April, al-Mansi and other villages in its vicinity were attacked by Haganah troops, and their inhabitants evacuated, and its inhabitants became refugees, most of them currently living in the Palestinian refugee camps, or in Jordan, Syria, Germany and the United States. The following days, the buildings of al-Mansi were blown up by Haganah.

Following the war the area was incorporated into the State of Israel. The kibbutz of Midrakh Oz was built close to the village site in 1952, and uses part of the village's former lands. The Palestinian historian Walid Khalidi described the village in 1992: "The remains of the school and the mosque are still standing in the midst of a thick undergrowth composed of vines and thorny bushes. The exposed foundations of the village buildings, surrounded by stone rubble, can be seen throughout the site. The agricultural kibbutz of Midrakh Oz occupies part of the adjacent land. The rest is used for growing avocado trees and raising poultry and cattle."

Some of the people of al-Mansi in Jordan formed a social club in Amman called Diwan al-Mansi (Arabic: ديوان آل المنسي), and in 2005 a book on al-Mansi was published.

== Bibliography ==
- Barron, J.B., ed. (1923). Palestine: Report and General Abstracts of the Census of 1922. Government of Palestine.
- Conder, C.R.; Kitchener, H.H. (1882). The Survey of Western Palestine: Memoirs of the Topography, Orography, Hydrography, and Archaeology. Vol. 2. London: Committee of the Palestine Exploration Fund.
- Department of Statistics (1945). Village Statistics, April, 1945. Government of Palestine.
- Hadawi, S. (1970). Village Statistics of 1945: A Classification of Land and Area ownership in Palestine. Palestine Liberation Organization Research Center. Archived from the original on 8 December 2018.
- Khalidi, W. (1992). All That Remains: The Palestinian Villages Occupied and Depopulated by Israel in 1948. Washington D.C.: Institute for Palestine Studies. ISBN 0-88728-224-5.
- Mills, E., ed. (1932). Census of Palestine 1931. Population of Villages, Towns and Administrative Areas. Jerusalem: Government of Palestine.
- Morris, B. (2004). The Birth of the Palestinian Refugee Problem Revisited. Cambridge University Press. ISBN 978-0-521-00967-6.
- Palmer, E.H. (1881). The Survey of Western Palestine: Arabic and English Name Lists Collected During the Survey by Lieutenants Conder and Kitchener, R. E. Transliterated and Explained by E.H. Palmer. Committee of the Palestine Exploration Fund.
- al-Qawuqji, F. (1972): Memoirs of al-Qawuqji, Fauzi in Journal of Palestine Studies
  - "Memoirs, 1948, Part I" in 1, no. 4 (Sum. 72): 27-58., dpf-file, downloadable
  - "Memoirs, 1948, Part II" in 2, no. 1 (Aut. 72): 3-33., dpf-file, downloadable
