= Daliyat al-Rawha' =

Arab village in Haifa subdistrict, Mandatory Palestine

Daliyat al-Rawha' دالية الروحاء Daliyat al Ruha, Daliyat ar Ruha
- Village
- Etymology: "The trailing vine of er Rûhah", p.n.
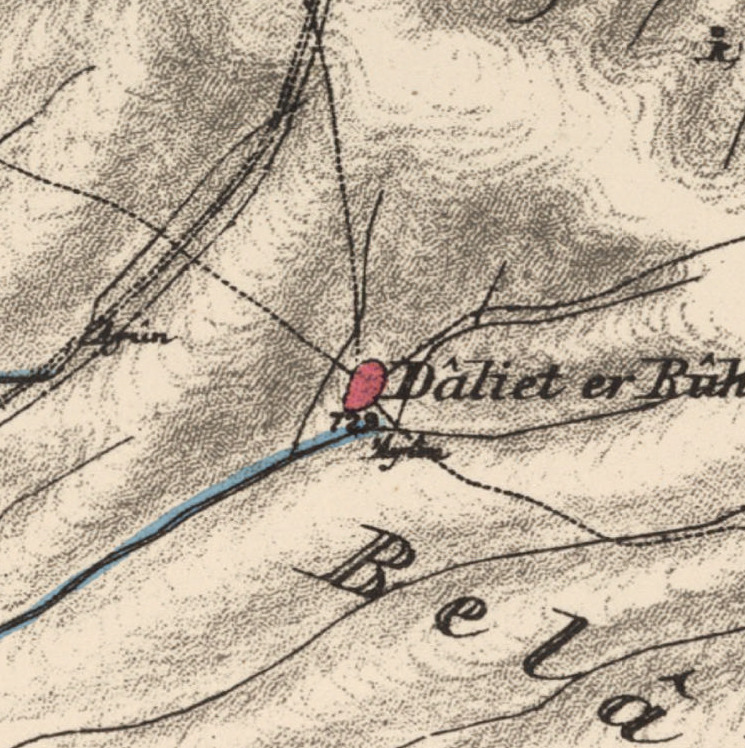
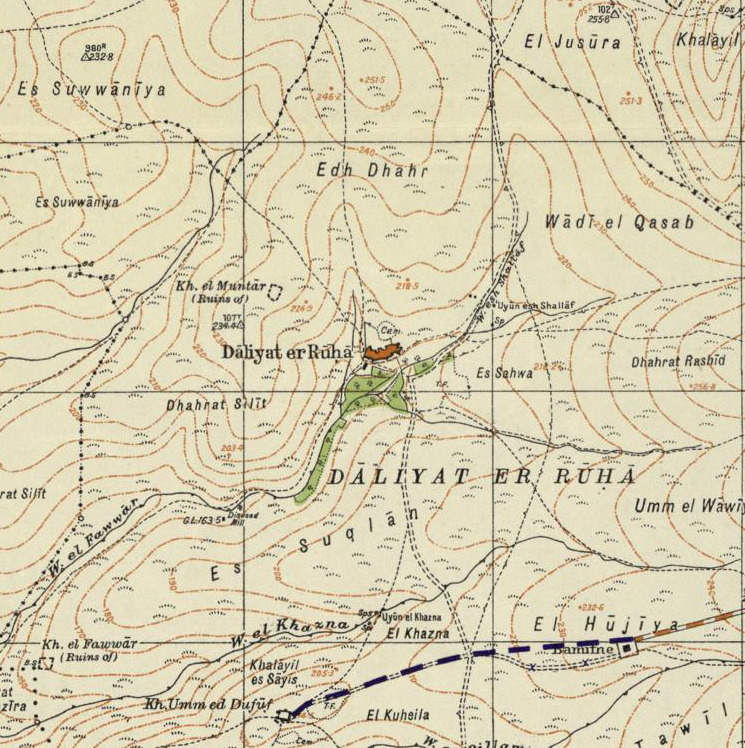
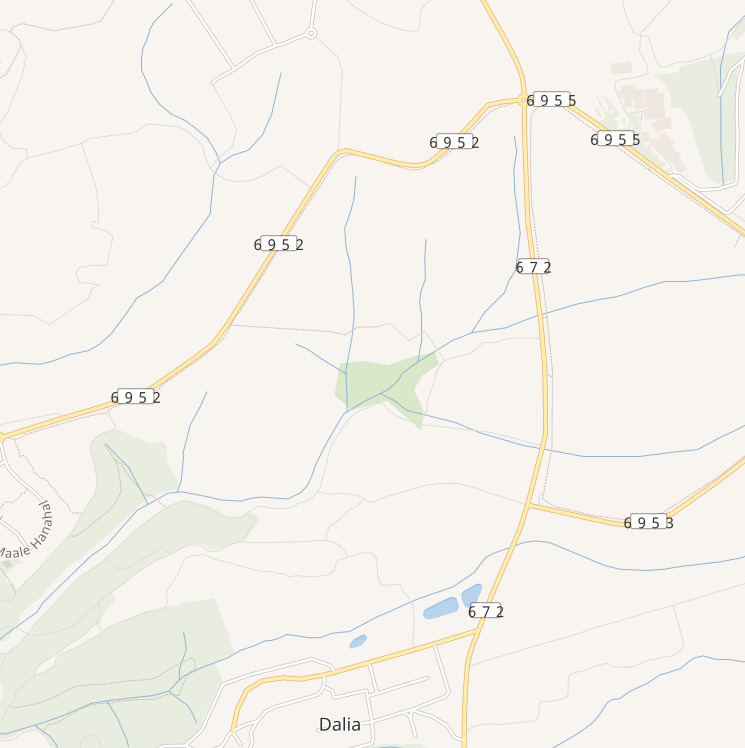
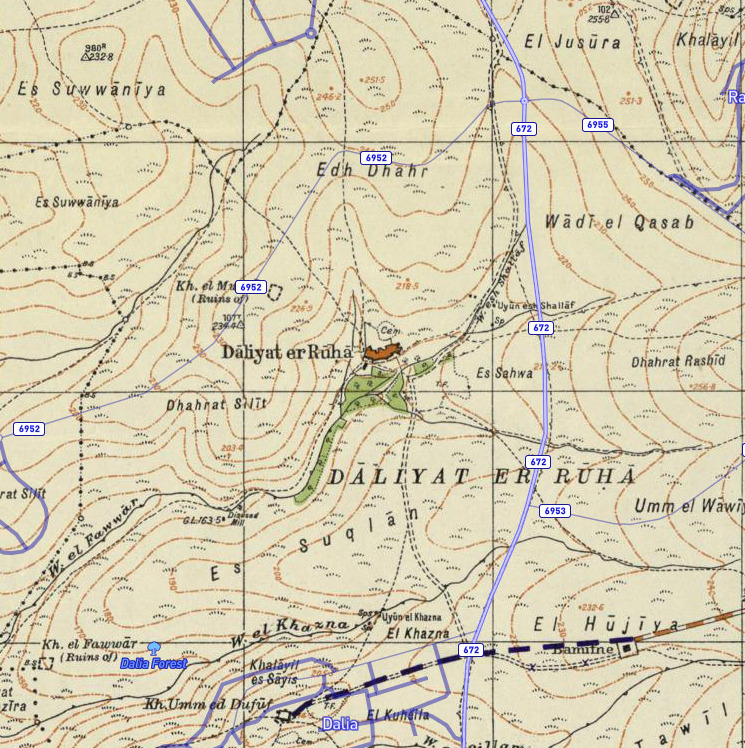
- 1870s map 1940s map modern map 1940s with modern overlay map A series of historical maps of the area around Daliyat al-Rawha' (click the buttons)

- Location within Mandatory Palestine
- Coordinates: 32°36′7″N 35°04′38″E
- Palestine grid: 157/223
- Geopolitical entity: Mandatory Palestine
- Subdistrict: Haifa
- Date of depopulation: late March 1948

Area
  - Total: 10,008 dunams (10.008 km^{2}; 3.864 sq mi)

Population (1945)
  - Total: 600
- Cause(s) of depopulation: Whispering campaign
- Secondary cause: Military assault by Yishuv forces
- Current Localities: Ramot Menashe? Dalia

Daliyat al-Rawha' (Arabic: دالية الروحاء, Dâliyat er Rûhâ, "vineyards (دالية) of al-Rawha") was a Palestinian village located 24.5 kilometers (15.2 mi) southeast of Haifa. It was the site of the signing of a ceasefire agreement between the forces of the Mamluks and the Crusaders in the 13th century. A small village of 60 Arab Muslims in the late 19th century, the kibbutz of Dalia was established on land purchased in the village in 1939. The population in 1945 reached 600 people: 280 Arabs and 320 Jews. It was depopulated of its Arab inhabitants in late March during the 1947–1948 civil war in Mandatory Palestine. Its remains lie at the very center of the Ramat Menashe Park of the JNF covered by the kibbutz of the same name.

== History ==
In 1281, the Mamluk sultan Qalawun stayed in Daliyat al-Rawha' while his forces battled against those of the Crusaders. According to Al-Maqrizi, the two sides signed a temporary peace treaty (hudna) in the village.

=== Ottoman era ===
In 1859 the population was estimated to be about 60, who cultivated 10 faddans of land. In 1882, the PEF's Survey of Western Palestine (SWP) described Daliyat al-Rawha' as being a village of moderate size, situated on the west side of a watershed, with a good spring close by on the south.

A population list from about 1887 showed that Daliet er Ruhah had about 195 inhabitants, all Muslim, while Khiryet Umm ed Duff had about 80 Muslim inhabitants.

=== British Mandate era ===
In the 1922 census of Palestine conducted by the British Mandate authorities, Dalia al-Ruha had a population 135, while Umm al-Defuf had a population of 44, all Muslims. In the 1931 census Daliat el Rauha had 163 Muslim inhabitants, in 46 houses, while Umm ed Dufuf had 49 Muslim inhabitants in 10 houses.

The villagers also raised livestock. The village had a rectangular layout from east to west. The houses were grouped closely together and made of stone, held together with mud or cement. The main water sources for the village were located nearby.

By the 20th century, the Arabs of Daliyat al-Rawha were tenant farmers. The Palestine Jewish Colonization Association (PICA) purchased 10,073 dunams of land in Daliyat al-Rawha and neighboring Umm ed-Dafuf in 1936. The kibbutz of Dalia was established in 1939 to the south of the built up area of Daliyat al-Rawha' on village lands. By 1939, the people of Umm ed-Dafuf, previously independent, were included in Daliyat al-Rawha'.

In the 1945 statistics the population was 280 Muslims, and a total of 10,008 dunams of land, most of it Jewish owned, according to an official land and population survey. Arabs used 98 dunams for plantations and irrigable land, 56 for cereals, while 24 dunams were built-up (urban) land.

Types of land use in dunams in the village in 1945:

Land Usage	Arab	Jewish
Irrigated and plantation	98	0
Cereal	56	9,595
Urban	24	19
Cultivable	154	9,595

The land ownership of the village before occupation in dunams:

Owner	Dunams
Arab	178
Jewish	9,614
Public	216
Total	10,008

=== 1948 war and aftermath ===
Benny Morris relates that Yosef Weitz was concerned with the problem posed by Arab tenant farmers in the area as early as January 1948. A diary entry Weitz made following a meeting with officials of the Jewish National Fund states:

"Is not now the time to be rid of them [he was referring specifically to the tenant farmers in Qira and Daliyat ar Ruha]? Why continue to keep in our midst these thorns at a time when they pose a danger to us? Our people are considering [solutions]."

In March 1948, Weitz organized with the Jewish residents of kibbutz Kfar Masaryk the eviction of the tenant communities at Daliyat al-Rawha' and Buteimat.

The New York Times reports the village was captured on April 14, 1948, during the Battle of Mishmar HaEmek. By mid-June 1948, according to David Ben-Gurion as based on a report written by Weitz, Daliyat al-Rawha' had been destroyed by the Israeli authorities, while the destruction of Buteimat and Sabbarin was about to begin. According to Morris, Ramot Menashe was established near the village lands almost immediately thereafter. Khalidi writes that Ramot Menashe is actually located on the lands of neighboring Sabbarin.

In 1995, a committee representing internally displaced Palestinians from Daliyat al-Rawha' joined the Association for the Defense of the Rights of the Internally Displaced (ADRID), a national committee in Israel that advocates for these internal refugees' right of return.

== Bibliography ==
- Avneri, Arieh L. (1984). The Claim of Dispossession: Jewish Land-settlement and the Arabs, 1878-1948. Transaction Publishers. ISBN 0-87855-964-7.
- Barron, J.B., ed. (1923). Palestine: Report and General Abstracts of the Census of 1922. Government of Palestine.
- Conder, C.R.; Kitchener, H.H. (1882). The Survey of Western Palestine: Memoirs of the Topography, Orography, Hydrography, and Archaeology. Vol. 2. London: Committee of the Palestine Exploration Fund.
- Government of Palestine, Department of Statistics (1945). Village Statistics, April, 1945.
- Hadawi, S. (1970). Village Statistics of 1945: A Classification of Land and Area ownership in Palestine. Palestine Liberation Organization Research Center.
- Khalidi, W. (1992). All That Remains: The Palestinian Villages Occupied and Depopulated by Israel in 1948. Washington D.C.: Institute for Palestine Studies. ISBN 0-88728-224-5.
- Masalha, N. (2005). Catastrophe remembered: Palestine, Israel and the internal refugees : essays in memory of Edward W. Said (1935-2003). Zed Books. ISBN 978-1-84277-623-0.
- Mills, E., ed. (1932). Census of Palestine 1931. Population of Villages, Towns and Administrative Areas. Jerusalem: Government of Palestine.
- Morris, B. (2004). The Birth of the Palestinian Refugee Problem Revisited. Cambridge University Press. ISBN 978-0-521-00967-6.
- Palmer, E.H. (1881). The Survey of Western Palestine: Arabic and English Name Lists Collected During the Survey by Lieutenants Conder and Kitchener, R. E. Transliterated and Explained by E.H. Palmer. Committee of the Palestine Exploration Fund.
- Schumacher, G. (1888). "Population list of the Liwa of Akka". Quarterly Statement - Palestine Exploration Fund. 20: 169–191.
