= Menashe Plateau Natural Region =

Coordinates: 32°36′42″N 35°25′36″E

- Natural Region
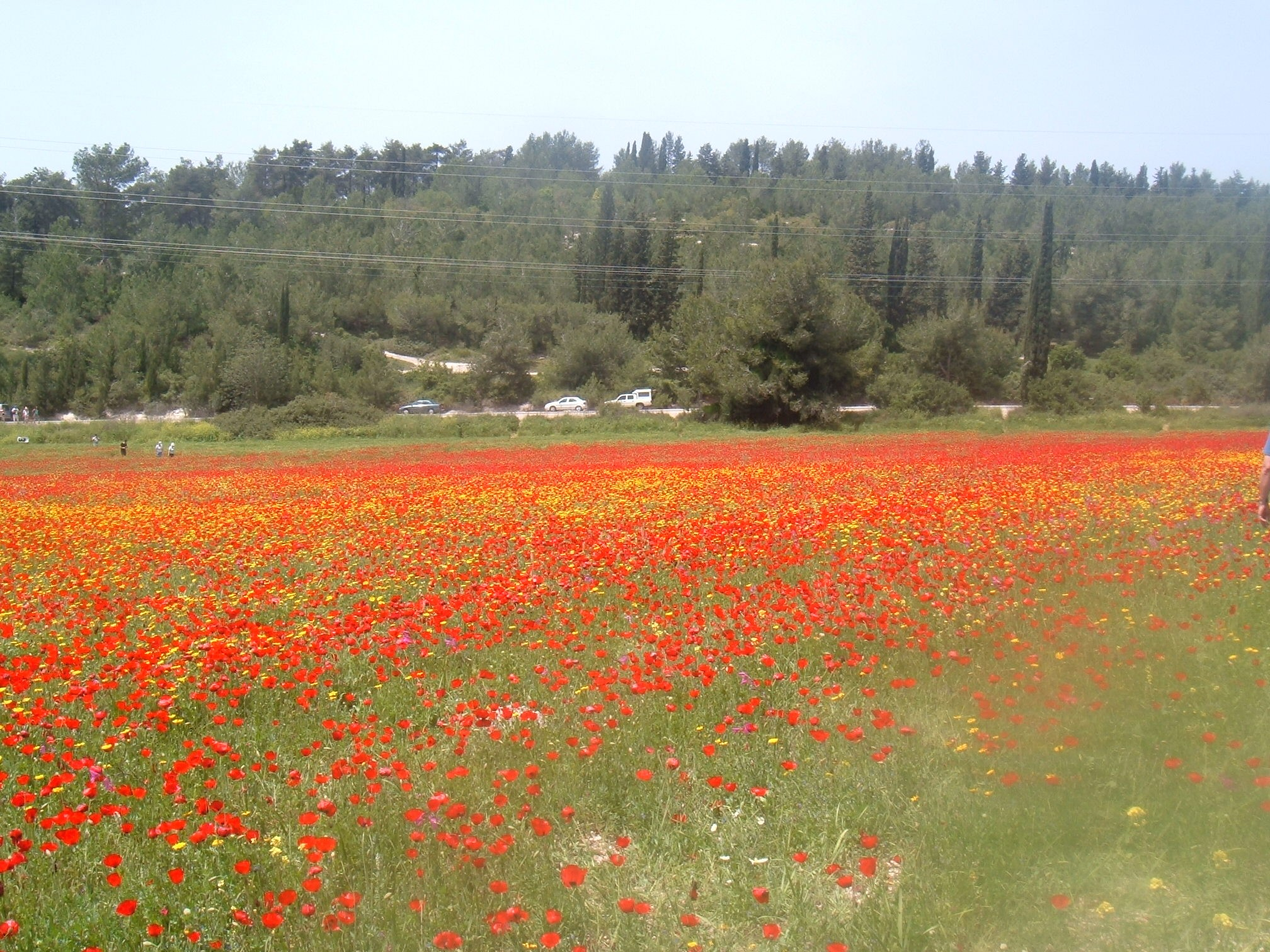
- Field near Ein HaShofet, one of the villages in the Menashe Plateau Natural Region
- Interactive map of Menashe Plateau Natural Region
- Country: Israel
- District: Northern
- Subdistrict: Jezreel
- Largest City: Ramot Menashe

Area
  - Total: 102 km^{2} (39 sq mi)

Population (2024)
  - Total: 6,701

Ethnicity
  - Jews and others: 98.0%
  - Arabs: 0.01%

The Menashe Plateau Natural Region is a natural region in the Jezreel Subdistrict, in the Northern District of Israel. It is entirely contained within the Megiddo Regional Council. Ramot Menashe is the largest town in the natural region.

== Geography ==
Districts, Subdistricts and Natural Regions of the State of Israel, 2018

The natural region is located west of Afula and south of Yokneam Illit and Mount Carmel. It overlooks the Jezreel Valley to the east, and borders Wadi Ara to the south. It has an area of 102 km^{2}.

== Demographics ==
It is the least populous natural region in the Jezreel Subdistrict. It does not contain any major cities; the largest town in the natural region is the village of Ramot Menashe, which contains just 20 percent of the natural region's population.

The vast majority of residents of the Menashe Plateau Natural Region are Jews. There are no Arab towns in the region.

Historical population
Year	Pop.	±%
1972	3,400	—
1983	3,800	+11.8%
1995	4,100	+7.9%
2008	4,700	+14.6%
2022	6,542	+39.2%
2024	6,701	+2.4%

== Administrative local authorities ==
Cities	Local Councils	Villages
[None]	[None]	Megiddo: Dalia; Elyakim; Ein HaEmek; Ein HaShofet; Gal'ed; Ramat HaShofet; Ramot Menashe

== Politics ==
In the 2022 election, 72 percent of voters in the natural region voted for the parties of the center-left coalition led by Yair Lapid, while 26 percent voted for the parties of the right-wing coalition led by Benjamin Netanyahu and 0.3 percent voted for the Arab parties.

In the 2026 election, 73 percent of voters in the natural region voted for the parties of the center-left coalition led by Gadi Eisenkot, while 23 percent voted for the parties of the right-wing coalition led by Benjamin Netanyahu and 0.6 percent voted for the Arab parties. An additional 2.3 percent voted for the Reservists, and 1 percent voted for Amcha Yisrael. Voter turnout increased 15 percent from the 2022 election.
