= Yokneam–Kfar Yehoshua railway station =

Railway station in Israel

Yokneam–Kfar Yehoshua יקנעם – כפר יהושע
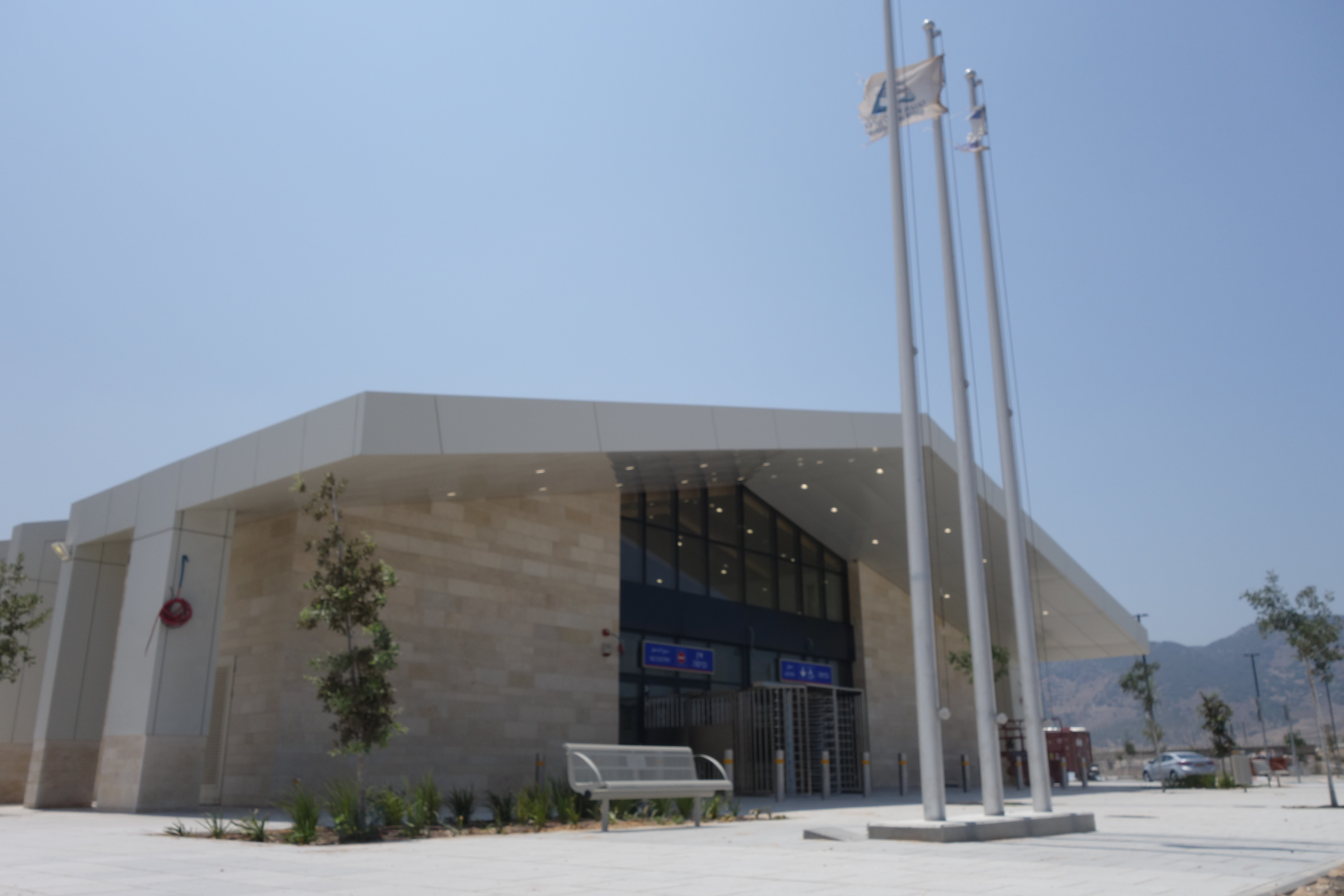
- Entrance to the station

General information
- Location: Israel
- Coordinates: 32.6808°N 35.1257°E
- Owner: Israel Railways
- Platforms: 1
- Tracks: 2

Construction
- Parking: 469 free spaces

History
- Opened: October 16, 2016

Passengers
- 2019: 339,789
- Rank: 60 out of 68
Location

Yokneam–Kfar Yehoshua railway station (Hebrew: תחנת הרכבת יקנעם – כפר יהושע) is an Israel Railways passenger station situated on the Jezreel Valley railway. The station serves Yokneam Illit, Kiryat Tiv'on, Ramat Yishai and the surrounding area. The station is located between Yokneam and Kfar Yehoshua, east of Highway 70 and south of Highway 722. It is served by one to two trains per hour in each direction.

== The new station ==
The Yokneam–Kfar Yehoshua railway station was built as part of the New Jezreel Valley railway, next to the Tishbi junction. The cost of constructing the station is estimated at 92 million NIS and was planned by architectural company Kuriel-Amar. The inspiration for the stations form came from the stations in the historical Jezreel Valley railway and also from the many agricultural structures that can be seen in the area with a similar design, a rectangular structure with a two-sided roof.

In addition to the station, there is also a water tower, inspired from the water towers that the historical line used. The original water towers were used for refilling the steam locomotives, but the modern tower was added to ensure constant water pressure in the station itself. The tracks are on ground level, but the access to the platforms requires the use of an underpass.

The station is located approximately 3 km north-east of Yokneam, 2.5 km west of Kfar Yehoshua and 2 km east of Kiryat Haroshet. The station is located outside of the urban areas and requires passengers to reach the station by vehicle, therefore the number of passengers has remained low.

== Public transportation connections ==
Near the station there is a bus terminal. There are seven bus routes that stop at the terminal. The frequency of most of the routes is every one or two hours. All seven routes are operated by Superbus. all of the routes are accessible for wheelchair users.

- Route 9: From Nofit via Kiryat Tiv'on to the station.
- Route 13: From Kiryat Tiv'on to the station.
- Route 22: From Ramat Yishai to Kfar Yehoshua via the station.
- Route 117: From the residential neighbourhoods in Yokneam Illit to the station.
- Route 118: From the industrial area in Yokneam Illit to the station.
- Route 184: From Gal'ed via Dalia, Ein HaShofet and Ramat HaShofet to the station.
- Route 185: From Ramot Menashe via Ein HaEmek and Eliakim to the station.

Preceding station	Israel Railways	Following station
Migdal HaEmek–Kfar Baruch towards Beit She'an	Beit She'an–Atlit	HaMifratz Central towards Atlit
