= Night of the Pitchforks =

Islamic Jihad attack in northern Israel

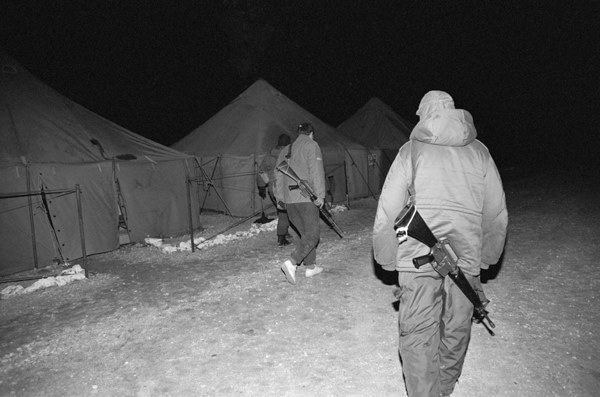
- Israeli soldiers inspect the scene of the attack

- Location of the attack
- Location: 32°34′07″N 35°07′24″E; IDF military recruit training base near Kibbutz Gal'ed, Israel
- Date: February 14, 1992
- Weapons: Knives, axes and a pitchfork
- Deaths: 3 Israeli soldiers
- Injuries: 1 Israeli soldier
- Perpetrator: Israeli Arab militants from the Wadi Ara area

The Night of the Pitchforks (Hebrew: ליל הקילשונים, Leil HaKilshonim), refers to an incident that took place on February 14, 1992, in which Israeli Arab militants from the Wadi Ara area, members of Islamic Jihad, infiltrated into an IDF military recruit training base near Kibbutz Gal'ed, in the Menashe Heights, and killed three Israeli soldiers.

== The attack ==
At the time of the attack, the Nahal Brigade's Basic Training Recruits were spending a week in field training near Kibbutz Gal'ed in Ramot Menashe. Their tent encampment had not been fenced off and was lightly guarded. The four killers entered the encampment armed with knives, axes, and a pitchfork. Once inside the encampment, they approached a tent and attacked the soldier guarding it, Corporal Yuri Preda, wounding him. The attackers chased Preda into the tent as he attempted to get away from them and stabbed him to death. They then attacked two other soldiers in the tent, killing Corporal Yaakov Dubinsky and wounding Private Sergei Zatziriyani. The attackers stole M-16 rifles from the tent before exiting it. Upon leaving the tent, they encountered Corporal Guy Friedman, who was in charge of training for the weekend, killed him, and stole his IMI Galil rifle. Another soldier who had noticed what was happening opened fire on the attackers, but his gun malfunctioned after he had fired two shots. The attackers escaped. When it became clear what had happened, the soldiers at the base could not call for help as the camp's electrical generator and two-way radio were not working, so soldiers had to go to kibbutz Gal'ed and call in assistance from there.

Preda, Dubinsky, and Zatziriyani were immigrants from the former Soviet Union who had only been in the army for three weeks. They had been undergoing a condensed basic training course before being posted to reserve units.

== Aftermath ==
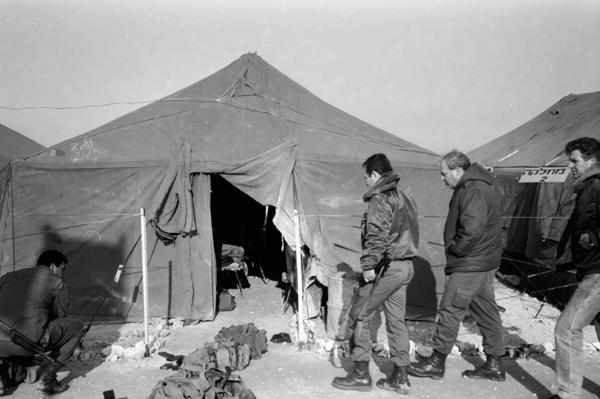
IDF Chief of Staff Ehud Barak inspects the scene of the attack

The killers were eventually caught by the Israel Police after intelligence pinpointed the house where the weapons were hidden. When they reached the house, they found a concrete wall which was not yet dry, arousing their suspicion. After digging up the concrete they found the murder weapons - the pitchfork, knives and axes which were used by the militants to kill the soldiers. After examining the weapons, an investigation led the police to the killers themselves. The arrests were announced in March 1992. The killers were brothers Ibrahim Hassan Agbariya and Mohammed Hassan Agbariya, their cousin Yahya Mustafa Agbariya, and Mohammed Tawfik Jabarin, residents of Umm al-Fahm and Musheirifa. They had been recruited by the Islamic Jihad Movement in Palestine.

The killers were tried in the Nazareth District Court. They freely admitted their actions, showed no remorse, and claimed to be serving Islam in a holy war against infidels. On April 29, 1992, they were sentenced to life imprisonment. They did not appeal the sentences.

== See also ==
- Night of the Gliders
