= Megiddo Regional Council =

Regional council in northern Israel

Coordinates: 32°35′N 35°11′E

Megiddo מגידו
- Regional council (from 1954)
- Interactive map of Megiddo
- Country: Israel
- District: Northern
- Subdistrict: Jezreel
- Natural region: Menashe Plateau, Yizre'el Valley, Yokneam

Government
  - Head of Municipality: Gil Lin

Area
  - Total: 173,420 dunams (173.42 km^{2}; 66.96 sq mi)

Population (2024)
  - Total: 12,734
  - Density: 73.429/km^{2} (190.18/sq mi)
- Website: Official website

The Megiddo Regional Council (Hebrew: מועצה אזורית מגידו, Mo'atza Azorit Megido) is a regional council in northern Israel encompassing land on the Menashe Plateau, and partly in the Jezreel Valley. The council is bounded by the city of Yokneam Illit to the north, and the Carmel mountain range to the east, and houses about 12,734 people on nine kibbutzim, and four moshavim located in its municipal territory.

The council is named after the ancient city of Megiddo, with the remains of this ancient city being located in the proximity of kibbutz Megiddo, in the territory of the council. The Head of the Regional Council from 2024 is Gil Lin.

== History ==
Megiddo Regional Council is one of the oldest regional councils in Israel, being established in 1945, three years before the establishment of the State of Israel. Before 1945, the territory of the council was part of Gush Nahalal, a municipal entity of the British Mandate. The first Head of the Megiddo Regional Council was Avraham Fine from Ein HaShofet.

At the time of its establishment, the council included only 3,000 inhabitants from five settlements. It was originally named "Harei Efrayim" (lit. Efrayim Hills), changing its name to "Megiddo" in 1952, although this change was only officially approved by the state in 1954.

The oldest settlement in the council is kibbutz Mishmar HaEmek, established in 1926, whilst the youngest settlement is moshav Midrakh Oz, established in 1952.

The official emblem of the regional council was designed in 1952 by Leo Platau from Hazorea. It depicts the hills of the region, an ear of wheat, and a lion. The ear of wheat represents the rural and agricultural nature of the council territory. The image of the lion was inspired by a seal, discovered in the ancient city of Megiddo.

== Culture and education ==
There is one high school located in the regional council, Megiddo Regional High School, located in kibbutz Ein HaShofet. There are three primary schools: Hatikva in Eliakim, Omarim in Yad Labanim Regional Center, and Plagim in HaZorea. Some students from the settlements in the Megiddo Regional Council attend schools located outside of the council's territory.

The Megiddo Community College is an institution for adult education and extracurricular activities, sponsored by the Israeli Ministry of Education. The college offers a variety of classes for both children and adults, including languages, computer skills, art, dance, music, history, Judaism, world religions, and martial arts. The college also organizes educational field trips for adults.

The Megiddo Dance School works to nurture the art of dance in the settlements of the Megiddo Regional Council. The school offers dance classes in the schools of the area, and works to involve dance in the lives of disabled students.

The Megiddo Music School offers practical and theoretical music classes to students in the schools of the regional council, including classical music, modern music, theory of music, and voice lessons.

== Ramot Menashe Biosphere Reserve ==
84 million square meters of the 170 million of the Megiddo Regional Council constitute a nature reserve, including forested areas, various water sources, volcanic hills and archaeological sites. The park is currently in the process of becoming recognized by UNESCO as a biosphere reserve.

The remains of seven depopulated Palestinian locations in Israel are within the boundaries of the reserve: Abu Shusha, al-Butaymat, Khubbayza, al-Rihaniyya, Daliyat al-Rawha’, Abu Zurayq, and al-Kafrayn.

== Economy ==
In addition to the agricultural and other industries in the various communities in the Regional Council, the Regional Council has joined with Yokneam Illit, and the Druze villages of Daliyat al-Karmel and Isfiya to develop a Jewish-Arab high-tech industrial park named Mevo Carmel that will become part of the larger Startup Village - Yokneam Ecosystem.

== List of settlements ==
=== Kibbutzim ===
- Dalia
- Ein HaShofet
- Gal'ed
- Giv'at Oz
- Hazorea
- Megiddo
- Mishmar HaEmek
- Ramat HaShofet
- Ramot Menashe

=== Other villages ===
- Ein HaEmek (community settlement)
- Eliakim (moshav)
- Midrakh Oz (moshav)
- Yokneam Moshava (moshava)

== Demographics ==
Historical population
Year	Pop.	±%
1972	6,600	—
1983	7,900	+19.7%
1995	7,900	+0.0%
2008	9,400	+19.0%
2022	12,530	+33.3%
2024	12,734	+1.6%

== Voting Patterns ==
In the 2022 election, 79 percent of voters in the regional council voted for the parties of the center-left coalition led by Yair Lapid, while 20 percent voted for the parties of the right-wing coalition led by Benjamin Netanyahu and 0.4 percent voted for the Arab parties.

In the 2026 election, 77 percent of voters in the regional council voted for the parties of the center-left coalition led by Gadi Eisenkot, while 19 percent voted for the parties of the right-wing coalition led by Benjamin Netanyahu and 0.5 percent voted for the Arab parties. An additional 2.3 percent voted for the Reservists, and 0.9 percent voted for Amcha Yisrael. Voter turnout increased 13 percent from the 2022 election.
