= Al-Rihaniyya =

Arab village in Haifa subdistrict, Mandatory Palestine

Al-Rihaniyya Rihaniya, -al
- Etymology: "Sweet basil"
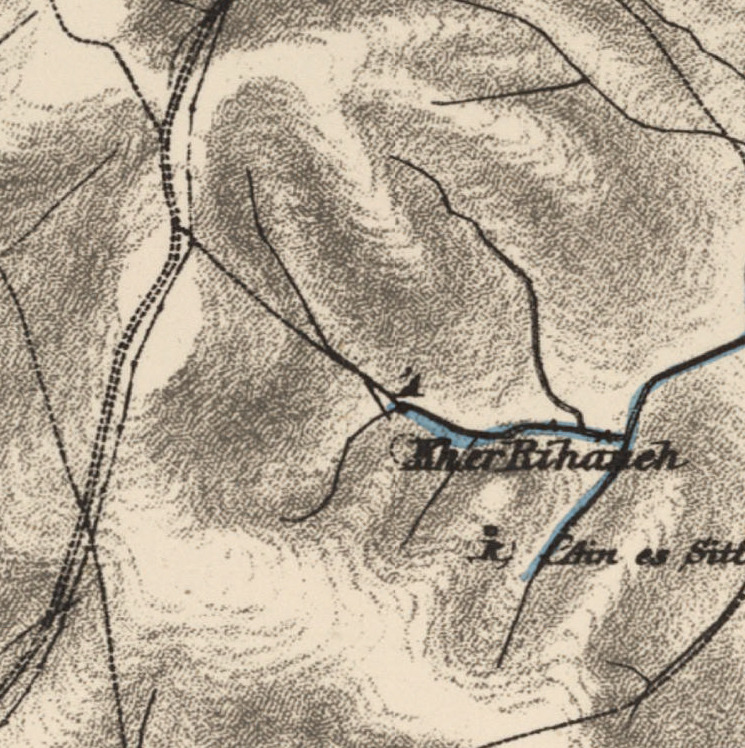
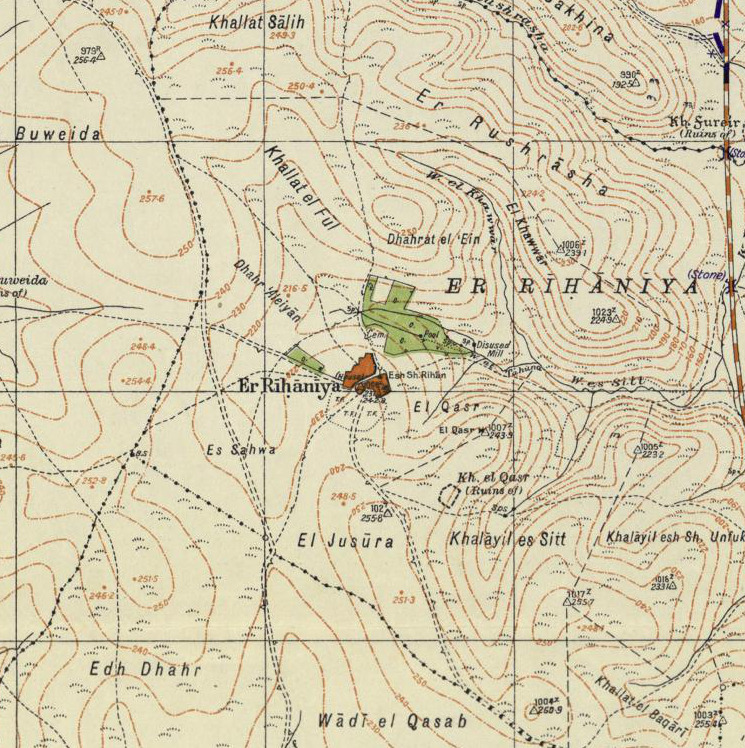
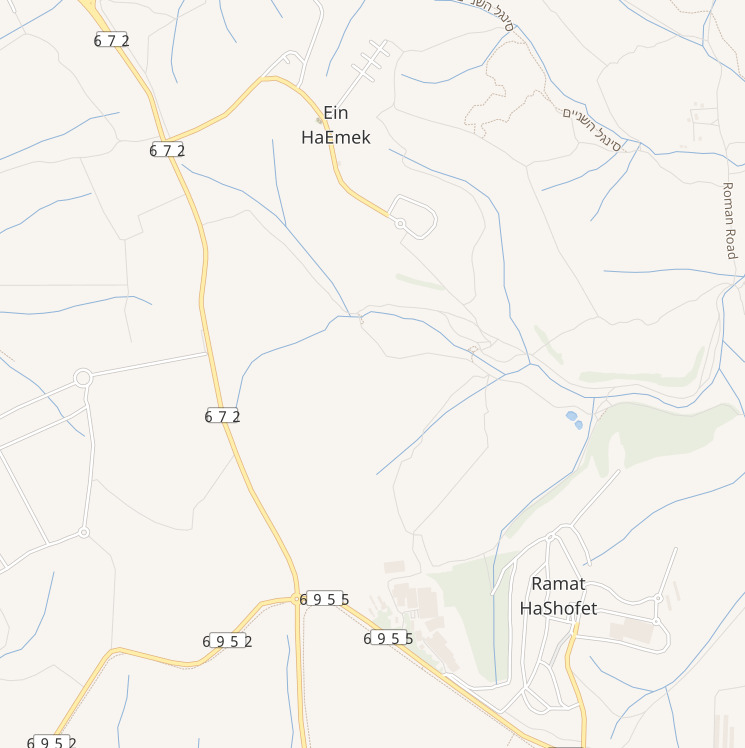
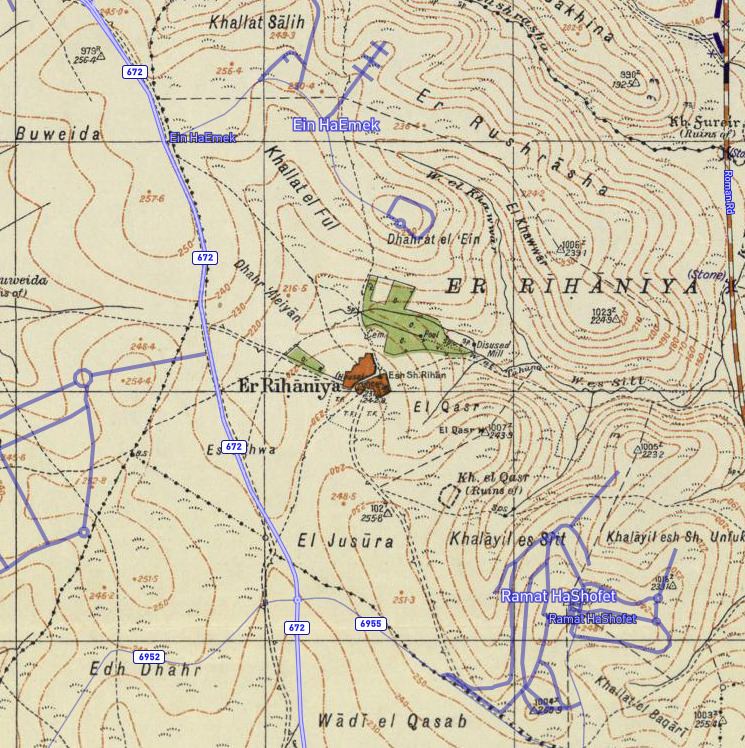
- 1870s map 1940s map modern map 1940s with modern overlay map A series of historical maps of the area around Al-Rihaniyya (click the buttons)

- Location within Mandatory Palestine
- Coordinates: 32°37′12″N 35°05′13″E
- Palestine grid: 158/225
- Geopolitical entity: Mandatory Palestine
- Subdistrict: Haifa
- Date of depopulation: Not known

Population (1945)
  - Total: 240
- Current Localities: Ramat HaShofet Ein HaEmek

Al-Rihaniyya was a Palestinian Arab village in the Haifa Subdistrict. It was depopulated during the 1947–1948 Civil War in Mandatory Palestine on 30 April 1948 as part of the battle of Mishmar HaEmek. It was located 25 km southeast of Haifa and 3 km northwest of Wadi al-Mileh.

== History ==
In 1882, the PEF's Survey of Western Palestine described Kh. Rihaneh as a village containing the remnants of watch-towers and two springs.

A population list from about 1887 showed that Rihaneh had about 190 inhabitants; all Muslims.

Al-Rihaniyya had an elementary school for boys founded in 1888 that was no longer open during the British Mandate period.

=== British Mandate era ===
In the 1922 census of Palestine, conducted by the British Mandate authorities, Al Rehaniyeh had a population of 266 Muslims, increasing in the 1931 census to 293 Muslim, in a total of 55 houses.

In the 1945 statistics, the village had a population of 240 Muslims, and the village's lands spanned 1,930 dunams. Of this, 1,761 dunums of land were used for cereals; 73 dunums were irrigated or used for orchards, while 46 dunams were built-up (urban) land.

=== 1948, aftermath ===
On 5 April 1948, after the Battle of Mishmar HaEmek the Haganah ordered the Golani Brigade to inform the residents four Arab villages including Rihaniya that they should leave for safety reasons.

On 14 April, The New York Times reported that Al-Rihaniyya was occupied, together with Daliyat al Ruha and Al-Butaymat. However Khalidi believes that the actual depopulation only happened two weeks later, during Passover Clearing.

Surviving villagers told Rosemarie Esber that they decided to leave Al-Rihaniyya on 30 April, as "we did not have guns to defend it". They took refugee in Umm az-Zinat, but when the Haganah attacked it (according to the villagers: unprovoked) they fled "with nothing but our clothes on", to Ijzim. They stayed at Ijzim for several months, until it also was attacked by Zionist forces, who "kicked everybody out". Esbers informants ended up in Umm al-Fahm.

Following the war the area was incorporated into the State of Israel, with the village's lands taken over by kibbutz Ramat HaShofet and the moshav of Ein HaEmek.

According to Khalidi's description in 1992, the village site was strewn with housing rubble, bushes and thorns. The village cemetery and a well were visible at the bottom of a hill to the north. The surrounding land was farmed and an avocado orchard lay to the south.

== Bibliography ==
- Barron, J. B., ed. (1923). Palestine: Report and General Abstracts of the Census of 1922. Government of Palestine.
- Conder, C.R.; Kitchener, H.H. (1882). The Survey of Western Palestine: Memoirs of the Topography, Orography, Hydrography, and Archaeology. Vol. 2. London: Committee of the Palestine Exploration Fund.
- Department of Statistics (1945). Village Statistics, April, 1945. Government of Palestine.
- Esber, R. (2008). Under the Cover of War, The Zionist Expulsions of the Palestinians. Arabicus Books & Media. ISBN 978-0981513171.
- Hadawi, S. (1970). Village Statistics of 1945: A Classification of Land and Area ownership in Palestine. Palestine Liberation Organization Research Center. Archived from the original on 2018-12-08.
- Khalidi, W. (1992). All That Remains: The Palestinian Villages Occupied and Depopulated by Israel in 1948. Washington D.C.: Institute for Palestine Studies. ISBN 0-88728-224-5.
- Mills, E., ed. (1932). Census of Palestine 1931. Population of Villages, Towns and Administrative Areas. Jerusalem: Government of Palestine.
- Morris, B. (2004). The Birth of the Palestinian Refugee Problem Revisited. Cambridge University Press. ISBN 978-0-521-00967-6.
- Palmer, E.H. (1881). The Survey of Western Palestine: Arabic and English Name Lists Collected During the Survey by Lieutenants Conder and Kitchener, R. E. Transliterated and Explained by E.H. Palmer. Committee of the Palestine Exploration Fund.
- Schumacher, G. (1888). "Population list of the Liwa of Akka". Quarterly Statement - Palestine Exploration Fund. 20: 169–191.
