= Midrakh Oz =

Midrakh Oz: מדרך עוז, מִדְרַךְ עֹז (Hebrew)
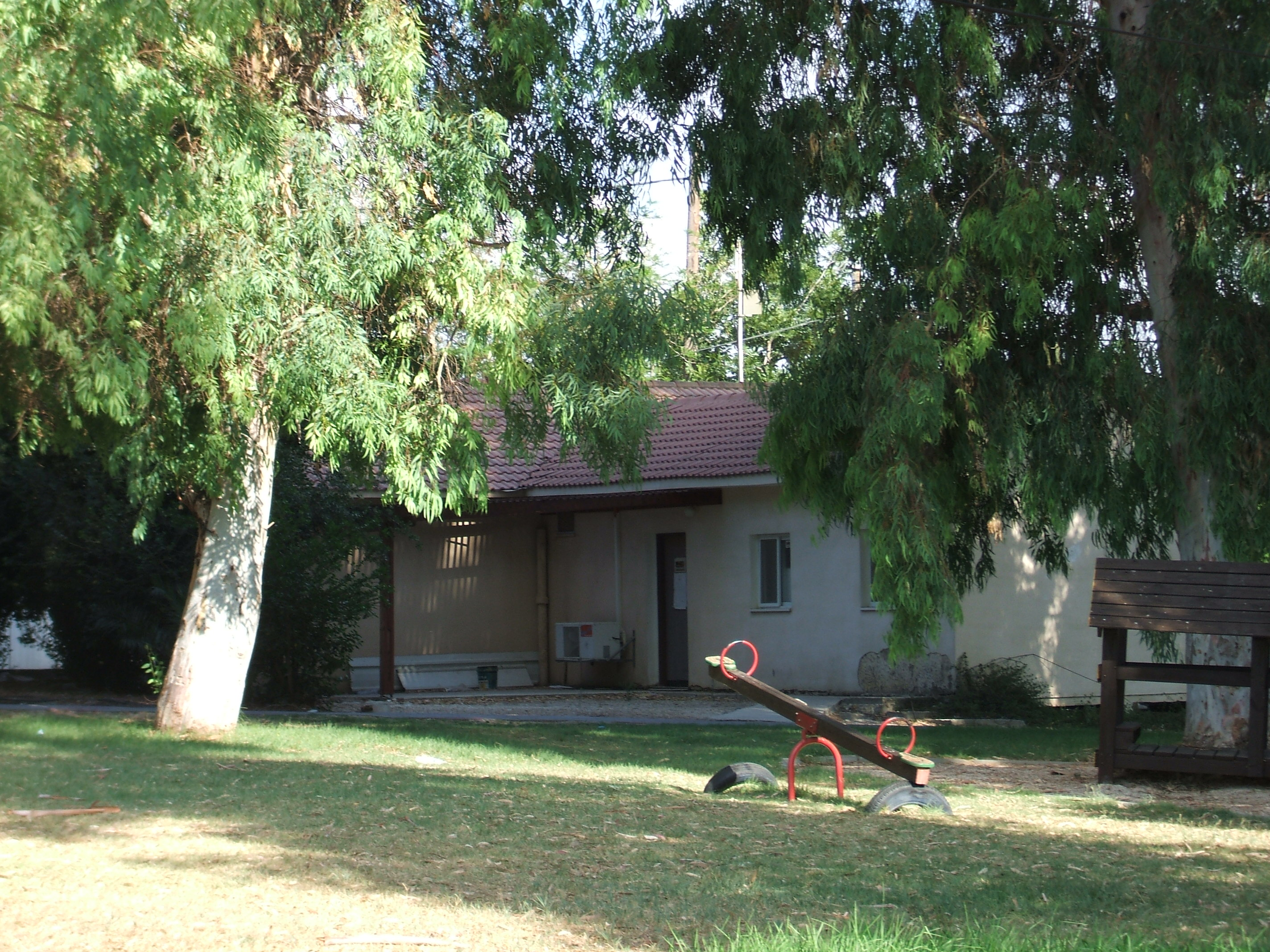
- Moshav office

- Location within Jezreel Valley region of Israel
- Coordinates: 32°35′43″N 35°9′30″E
- Country: Israel
- District: Northern
- Subdistrict: Jezreel
- Council: Megiddo
- Affiliation: Moshavim Movement
- Founded: 1952
- Founder: Yemenite Jews
- Population (2024): 833

Midrakh Oz (Hebrew: מִדְרַךְ עֹז, lit. 'Foothold of Strength') is an agricultural moshav in northern Israel. Located in the Jezreel Valley, it falls under the jurisdiction of Megiddo Regional Council. In 2024 it had a population of 833, both religious and secular Jews.

== Etymology ==
"Midrakh Oz" inspired by a passage in the Song of Deborah (Book of Judges 5:21).

The brook Kishon swept them away, that ancient brook, the brook Kishon. O my soul, tread them down with strength.

== Geography ==
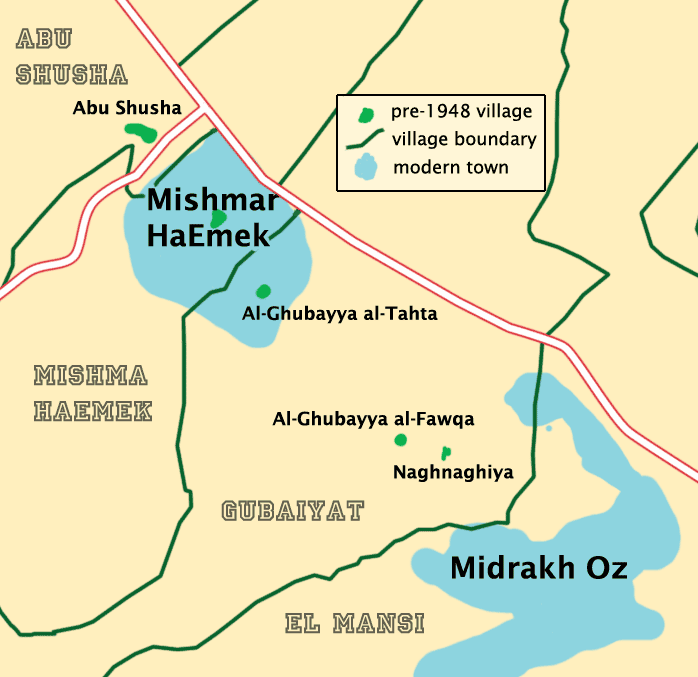
Midrakh Oz in historical context

The moshav is located in a valley called "Mansi Valley", part of the larger Jezreel Valley, near Manasseh Park and is surrounded by green hills of the Plain of Manasseh. It is at an attitude of 128 meters above sea level, 7 km south-east of Yokneam Illit. The moshav lies on Highway 66, which is connected to Highway 65 through nearby Megiddo Junction, connecting the moshav to Haifa and Afula.

== History ==
In 1951, a Ma'abara was built named "Ma'abarat Mansi" and was populated by Jewish immigrants from Yemen. The origins of the families who arrived can be traced in twelve villages and towns in Yemen's central and southwestern regions, with the large majority from five villages south of Yemen's capital Sana'a. Midrakh Oz was built on land near the former depopulated Palestinian villages of Al-Mansi and Al-Ghubayya al-Tahta.

A year later the Ma'abara was dismantled and on 12 December 1952 Moshav was established, first named "Mansi" and later renamed to "Midrakh Oz".

Between 2000 and 2008 Israel had its milk reform and 13,000,000 NIS were invested in the moshav (around 5,000 NIS per cow), about half was provided by the locals.

An expansion of the moshav was built on one of the nearby hills called Khirbat el Khishash, at the foot of the Menashe Heights overlooking the Jezreel Valley and the first stage was completed in 2008 with 83 residential units.

== Economy ==
All of Midrakh Oz's food productions are members of a local agricultural association called "Oz Dganim". All members pay member's fee and take full responsibility for running the foods center.

Midrakh Oz's dairy farming is considered one of the prominent in Israel, with an annual production of 13.5 million litres of milk. Until the 90s there were 48 milk producers in 46 dairies and after Israel's milk reform, 31 milk producers were left in 26 dairies. Prior to the reform, the dairy farming caused pollution inside the moshav and each cow received on average only 5 m2. The reform improved the environmental condition and each cow received 18 m2 on average. Today most of the work is done by foreign workers.

== Bibliography ==
- Brin Ingber, Judith (2011). Seeing Israeli and Jewish dance. Detroit : Wayne State University Press. ISBN 978-0814333303.
- Khalidi, Walid (1992). All That Remains: The Palestinian Villages Occupied and Depopulated by Israel in 1948. Washington D.C.: Institute for Palestine Studies. ISBN 0-88728-224-5.
