= Umm az-Zinat =

Umm az Zinat أُم الزينات
- Etymology: the place of ornamentation or of festivals
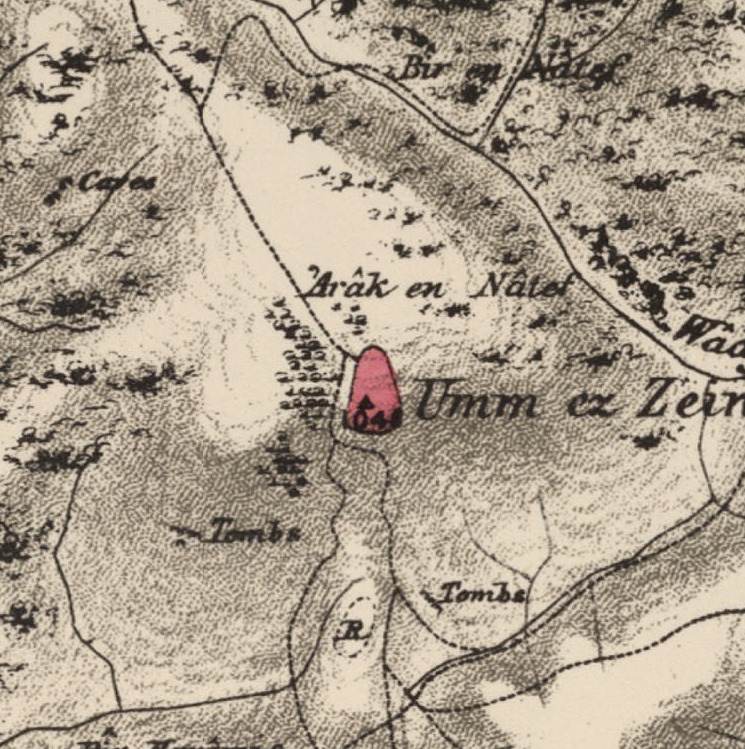
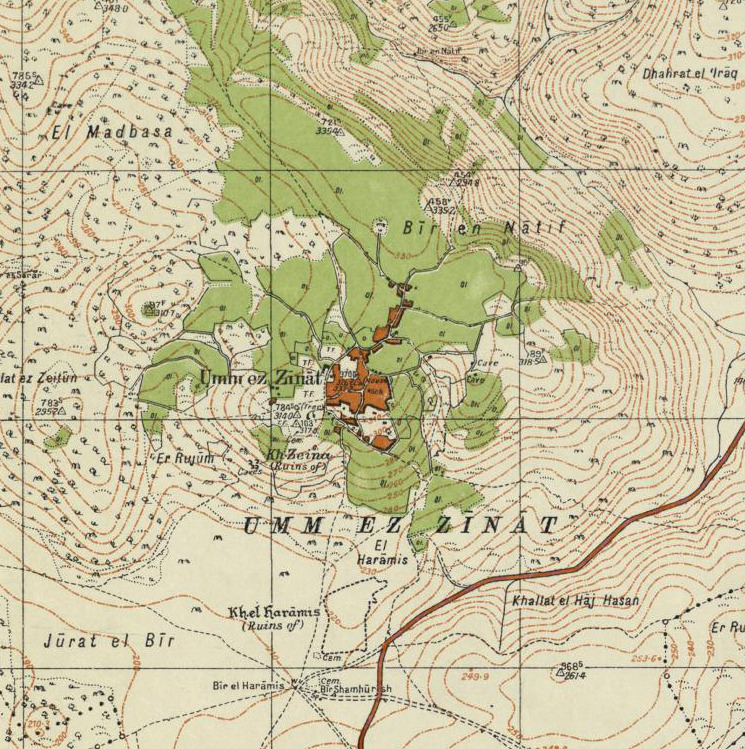
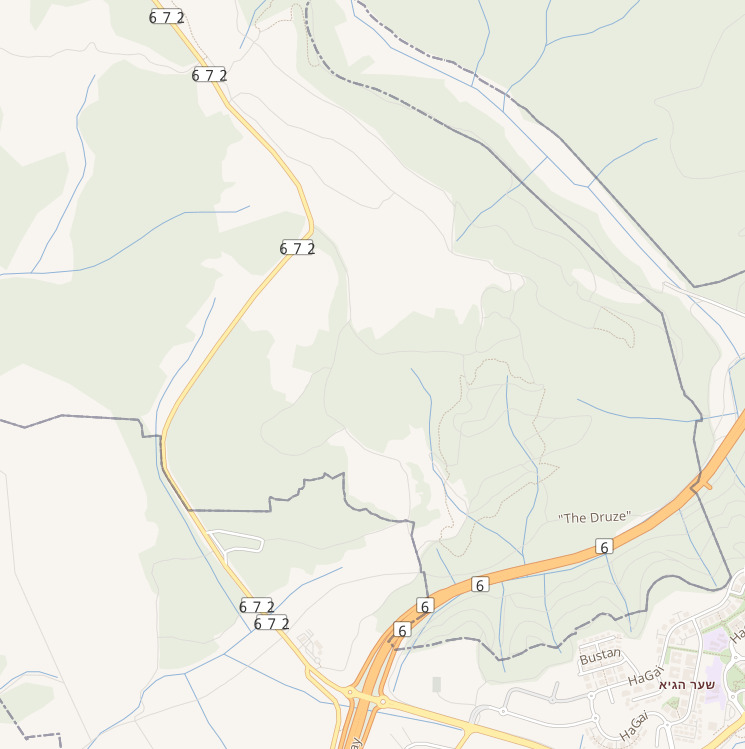
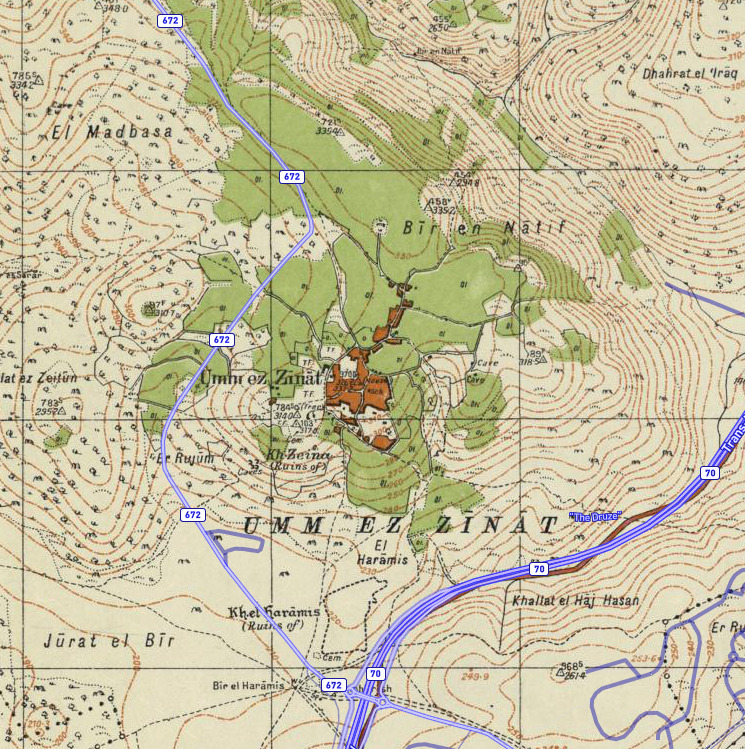
- 1870s map 1940s map modern map 1940s with modern overlay map A series of historical maps of the area around Umm az-Zinat (click the buttons)

- Location within Mandatory Palestine
- Coordinates: 32°38′53″N 35°03′55″E
- Palestine grid: 156/228
- Geopolitical entity: Mandatory Palestine
- Subdistrict: Haifa
- Date of depopulation: May 1948

Area
  - Total: 22,156 dunams (22.156 km^{2}; 8.554 sq mi)

Population (1945)
  - Total: 1,470
- Cause(s) of depopulation: Fear of being caught up in the fighting
- Current Localities: Eliakim

Umm az-Zinat (Arabic: أُم الزينات, Umm ez Zînât) was a Palestinian Arab village in the Haifa Subdistrict. It was depopulated during the 1948 War on May 15, 1948, by Golani Brigade's Fourth Battalion. It was located 20.5 km southeast of Haifa.

== History ==
Ceramics from the Byzantine era have been found here. Several rock cut tombs were found south and south west of the village. They have been dated to the Christian era.

=== Ottoman era ===
In 1859, the English Consul Rogers stated that the population was 350 souls, with 25 feddans of cultivation.

In 1870, Victor Guérin found the village to have four hundred and fifty inhabitants. Some gardens were surrounded by a cactus. The medhafeh, or guest house, also served as a mosque.

In 1882, the PEF's Survey of Western Palestine (SWP) described the village as: "A good-sized village on a saddle, built principally of stone, with a well on the south. This seems to be an ancient site, having many well-cut rock-tombs."

A population list from about 1887 showed that Umm ez-Zeinat had about 750 inhabitants; all Muslims.

Umm al-Zinat had an elementary school for boys which was founded by the Ottomans in 1888.

=== British Mandate era ===
In the 1922 census of Palestine Umm al-Zainat had a population of 787; 782 Muslims and 5 Christians, where the Christians were all Melkite. This had increased in the 1931 census to 1,020 Muslims and 9 Christians, in a total of 209 houses.

In the 1945 statistics, the village had a population of 1,470; 1,450 Muslims and 20 Christians, with a total of 22,156 dunams of land. Of this, 1,742 dunums of land were for plantations and irrigable land, 9,879 for cereals, while 69 dunams were classified as built-up land.

=== 1948, aftermath ===
Umm az-Zinat became depopulated in May 1948. In early May, it was reported that the women and children of Umm az-Zinat had been evacuated.

One of the villagers said that "One day before the fall of Umm al-Zaynat, three men from the settlement of Ein HaEmek entered our village, warning us that the Haganah forces were preparing to enter our village, where their aim was to intimidate us to flee, and leave the village. Some of them feared and fled, and some of them remained and waited for their fate."

The Golani Brigade took the village on 15 May, 1948, and expelled the remaining villagers. In August 1948 Israeli troops returned, with orders to kill any males and expel any females they found in the village. At least 2 Palestinian men were killed, and a number of females were expelled.

In 1949 Eliakim was established, just south of the village site.

In 1992 the village site was described: "The houses have been reduced to rubble, piles of which are scattered over the site. The site itself is overgrown with thorns, bushes, cactuses, and pomegranate and fig trees. There is also a small forest on part of the site. The village's cemetery is still visible. Part of the surrounding land is used by Israeli farmers as cattle pasture and is planted with fruit and olive trees."

== Bibliography ==
- Barron, J.B., ed. (1923). Palestine: Report and General Abstracts of the Census of 1922. Government of Palestine.
- Conder, C.R.; Kitchener, H.H. (1882). The Survey of Western Palestine: Memoirs of the Topography, Orography, Hydrography, and Archaeology. Vol. 2. London: Committee of the Palestine Exploration Fund.
- Department of Statistics (1945). Village Statistics, April, 1945. Government of Palestine.
- Dauphin, C. (1998). La Palestine byzantine, Peuplement et Populations. BAR International Series 726 (in French). Vol. III : Catalogue. Oxford: Archeopress. ISBN 0-860549-05-4.
- Guérin, V. (1875). Description Géographique Historique et Archéologique de la Palestine (in French). Vol. 2: Samarie, pt. 2. Paris: L'Imprimerie Nationale.
- Hadawi, S. (1970). Village Statistics of 1945: A Classification of Land and Area ownership in Palestine. Palestine Liberation Organization Research Center.
- Khalidi, W. (1992). All That Remains: The Palestinian Villages Occupied and Depopulated by Israel in 1948. Washington D.C.: Institute for Palestine Studies. ISBN 0-88728-224-5.
- Mills, E., ed. (1932). Census of Palestine 1931. Population of Villages, Towns and Administrative Areas. Jerusalem: Government of Palestine.
- Morris, B. (2004). The Birth of the Palestinian Refugee Problem Revisited. Cambridge University Press. ISBN 978-0-521-00967-6.
- Mülinen, Egbert Friedrich von 1908, Beiträge zur Kenntnis des Karmels "Separateabdruck aus der Zeitschrift des Deutschen Palëstina-Vereins Band XXX (1907) Seite 117-207 und Band XXXI (1908) Seite 1-258." Umm ez-Zeinat: p.353 ff.
- Palmer, E.H. (1881). The Survey of Western Palestine: Arabic and English Name Lists Collected During the Survey by Lieutenants Conder and Kitchener, R. E. Transliterated and Explained by E.H. Palmer. Committee of the Palestine Exploration Fund.
- Schumacher, G. (1888). "Population list of the Liwa of Akka". Quarterly Statement - Palestine Exploration Fund. 20: 169–191.
