= Ein HaEmek =

Community settlement in northern Israel

Ein HaEmek: עֵין הָעֵמֶק (Hebrew)
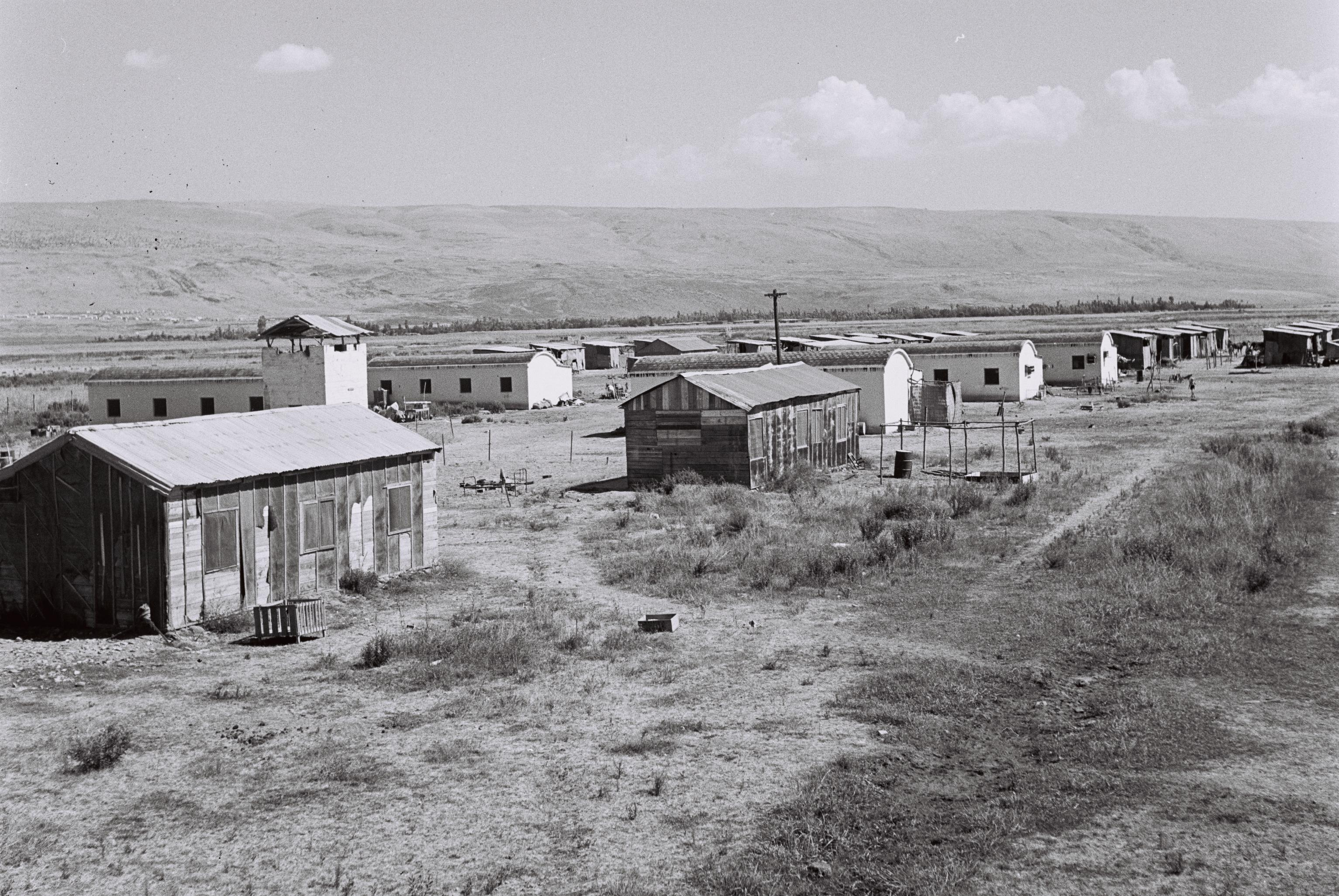
- Ein HaEmek in 1946

- Location within Jezreel Valley region of Israel Location within Israel
- Coordinates: 32°37′47″N 35°5′3″E
- Country: Israel
- District: Northern
- Subdistrict: Jezreel
- Council: Megiddo
- Founded: 1944
- Founder: Kurdish Jews
- Population (2024): 802

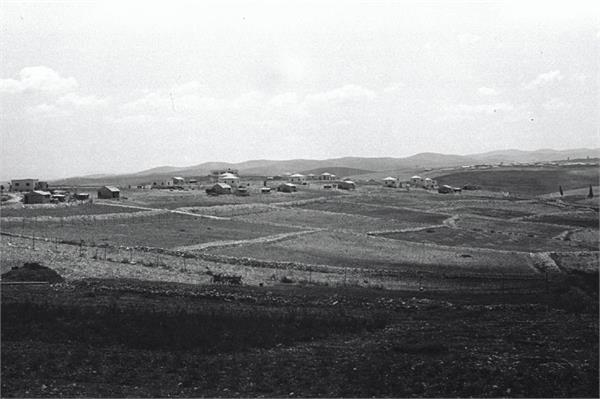
Ein HaEmek in 1947

Ein HaEmek (Hebrew: עֵין הָעֵמֶק, lit. 'Eye of the Valley') is a community settlement in northern Israel. Located near Yokneam, it falls under the jurisdiction of Megiddo Regional Council. In 2024 it had a population of 802.

The name "Ein HaEmek" indicates its location at the top of the hill, overlooking the valleys around it.

== History ==
The village was established as a moshav in 1944 by a group of 30 immigrant families from Kurdistan, and was initially named Kedem after the organization which helped the founders make aliyah.

After the Palestinian village of al-Rihaniyya was depopulated in the 1948 Arab-Israeli war, Ein HaEmek and Ramat HaShofet absorbed the lands nearby.

Ein HaEmek became the seventh community settlement in the Ramot Menashe region and joined the six Jewish communities established before it; Mishmar HaEmek (1926), Yokneam Moshava (1935), HaZorea (1936), Ein HaShofet (1937), Dalia (1939) and Ramat HaShofet (1941).

For many years Ein HaEmek was an agricultural moshav, consisting of farms based on pasture, cereal crops and olive trees. Starting in the 1980s, the nature of the moshav began to change due to demographic growth and a trend towards non-agricultural professions.
