= Eliakim =

Moshav in northern Israel

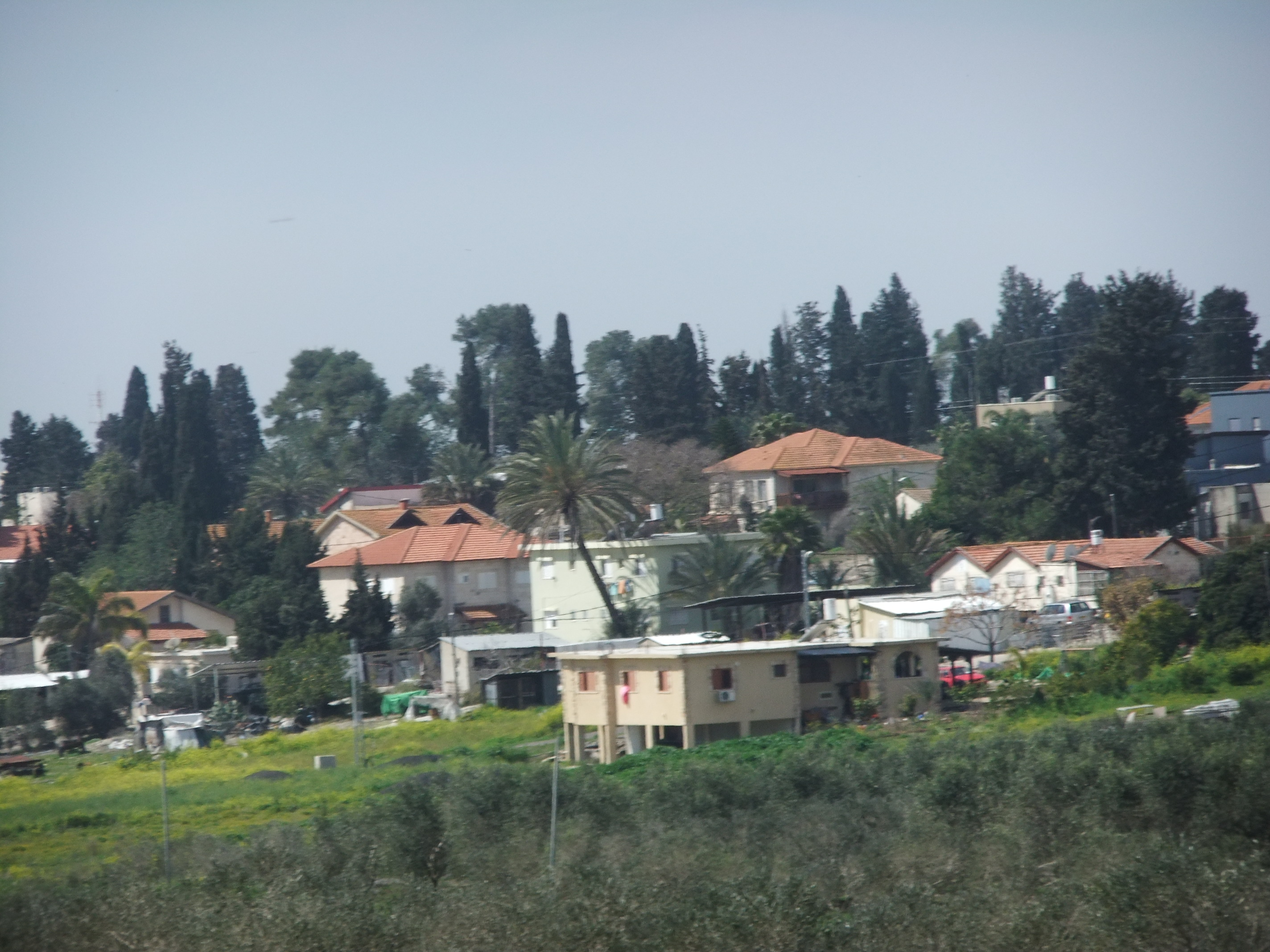

- Location within Jezreel Valley region of Israel Location within Israel
- Coordinates: 32°37′57″N 35°3′59″E
- Country: Israel
- District: Northern
- Subdistrict: Jezreel
- Council: Megiddo
- Affiliation: Moshavim Movement
- Founded: 1949
- Founder: Yemenite Jews
- Population (2024): 943

Eliakim (Hebrew: אֶלְיָקִים) is a moshav in northern Israel. Located in the Menashe Heights, it falls under the jurisdiction of Megiddo Regional Council. In 2024 it had a population of 943.

== History ==
The village was established in 1949 as a moshav by Jewish refugees from Yemen, on the lands of the depopulated Palestinian village of Umm az-Zinat. It was named after Jehoiakim (who was originally named Eliakim), a King of Judah (2 Kings 23:34). In 1970 it was converted to a communal settlement, but returned to being a moshav in 2008.

== Archaeology ==
A large burial cave was unearthed at Eliakim, featuring a poorly executed inscription above its entrance, using the Samaritan script, which reads "El'azar son of Azariah". The cave houses three burial troughs and a loculus.

== Notable residents ==
- Boaz Mauda, winner of season 5 of Kokhav Nolad
