= Al-Butaymat =

Al-Butaymat البطيمات Buteimat, al-Buteimat
- Village
- Etymology: "the place with the terebinths."
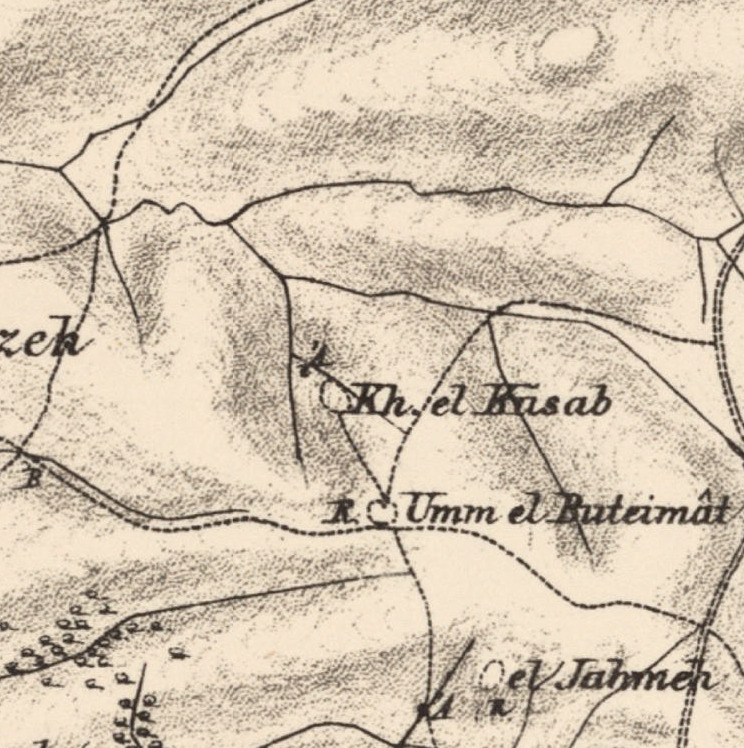
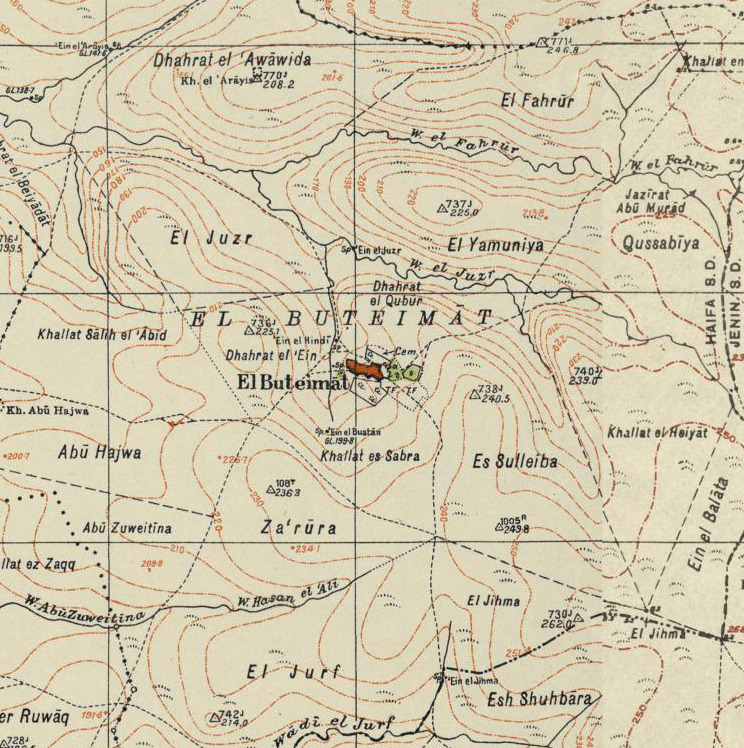
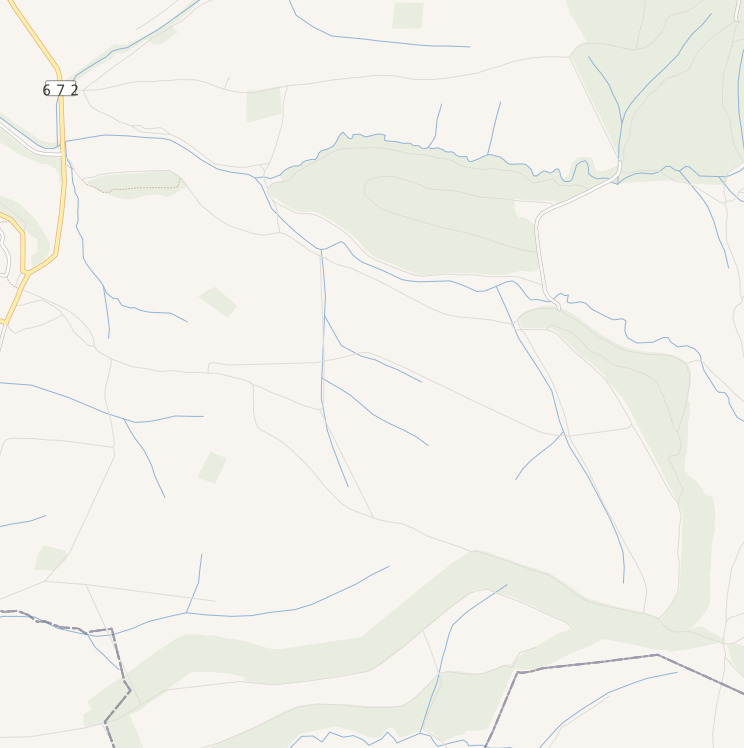
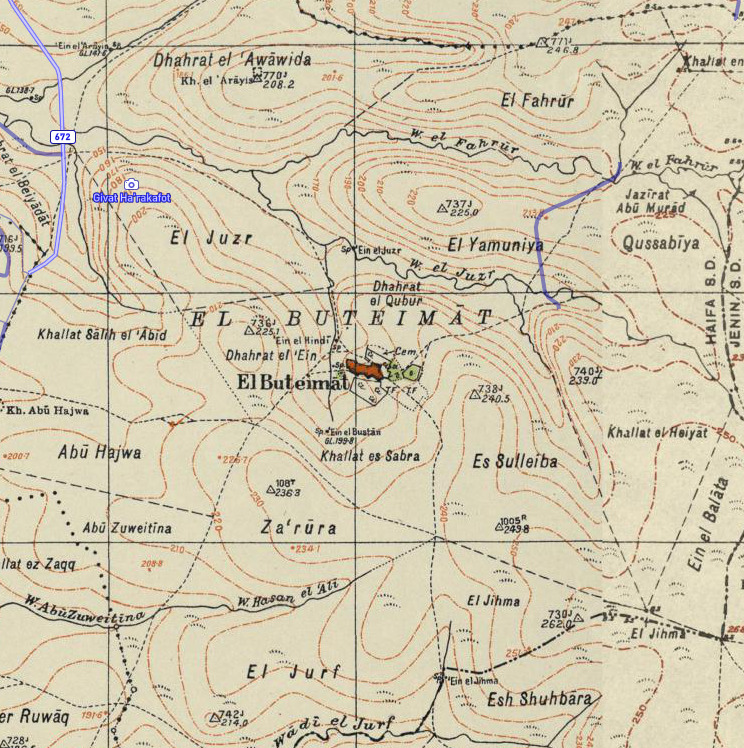
- 1870s map 1940s map modern map 1940s with modern overlay map A series of historical maps of the area around Al-Butaymat (click the buttons)

- Location within Mandatory Palestine
- Coordinates: 32°33′12″N 35°5′38″E
- Palestine grid: 159/217
- Geopolitical entity: Mandatory Palestine
- Subdistrict: Haifa
- Date of depopulation: May 1948

Population (1945)
  - Total: 110
- Cause(s) of depopulation: Fear of being caught up in the fighting
- Current Localities: Gal'ed Former: Regavim

Al-Butaymat (Arabic: البطيمات, El Buteimât) was a Palestinian Arab village the Haifa Subdistrict, located 31 kilometers (19 mi) southeast of Haifa. It was depopulated during the 1947–48 Civil War in Mandatory Palestine on May 1, 1948, under the Battle of Mishmar HaEmek.

== History ==
In 1882, the PEF's Survey of Western Palestine (SWP) found "traces of ruins" here.

Haifa merchant Mustafa al-Khalil acquired land in among other places, Al-Butaymat, in the late Ottoman era.

During the 19th and first half of the 20th century, al-Butaymat was one of the settlements of the so-called "Fahmawi Commonwealth" established by Hebronite clans belonging to Umm al-Fahm. The Commonwealth consisted of a network of interspersed communities connected by ties of kinship, and socially, economically and politically affiliated with Umm al Fahm. The Commonwealth dominated vast sections of Bilad al-Ruha/Ramot Menashe, Wadi 'Ara and Marj Ibn 'Amir/Jezreel Valley during that time.

=== British Mandate era ===
In the 1922 census of Palestine conducted by the British Mandate authorities, ‘’Al Buteimat’’ had a population 137, all Muslims, decreasing in the 1931 census to 112 Muslims, in a total of 29 houses.

In the 1945 statistics the village had a population of 110 Muslims, and they had 3,832 dunams (45 percent) of land according to an official land and population survey. Of this, 8 dunams were for plantations and irrigable land, 2,508 for cereals, while 4 dunams were built-up (urban) land. Meanwhile, Jews owned an additional 4,724 dunams (55 percent) of land.(pp. 10)

In 1945 the kibbutz of Gal'ed was established on what was traditionally village land.

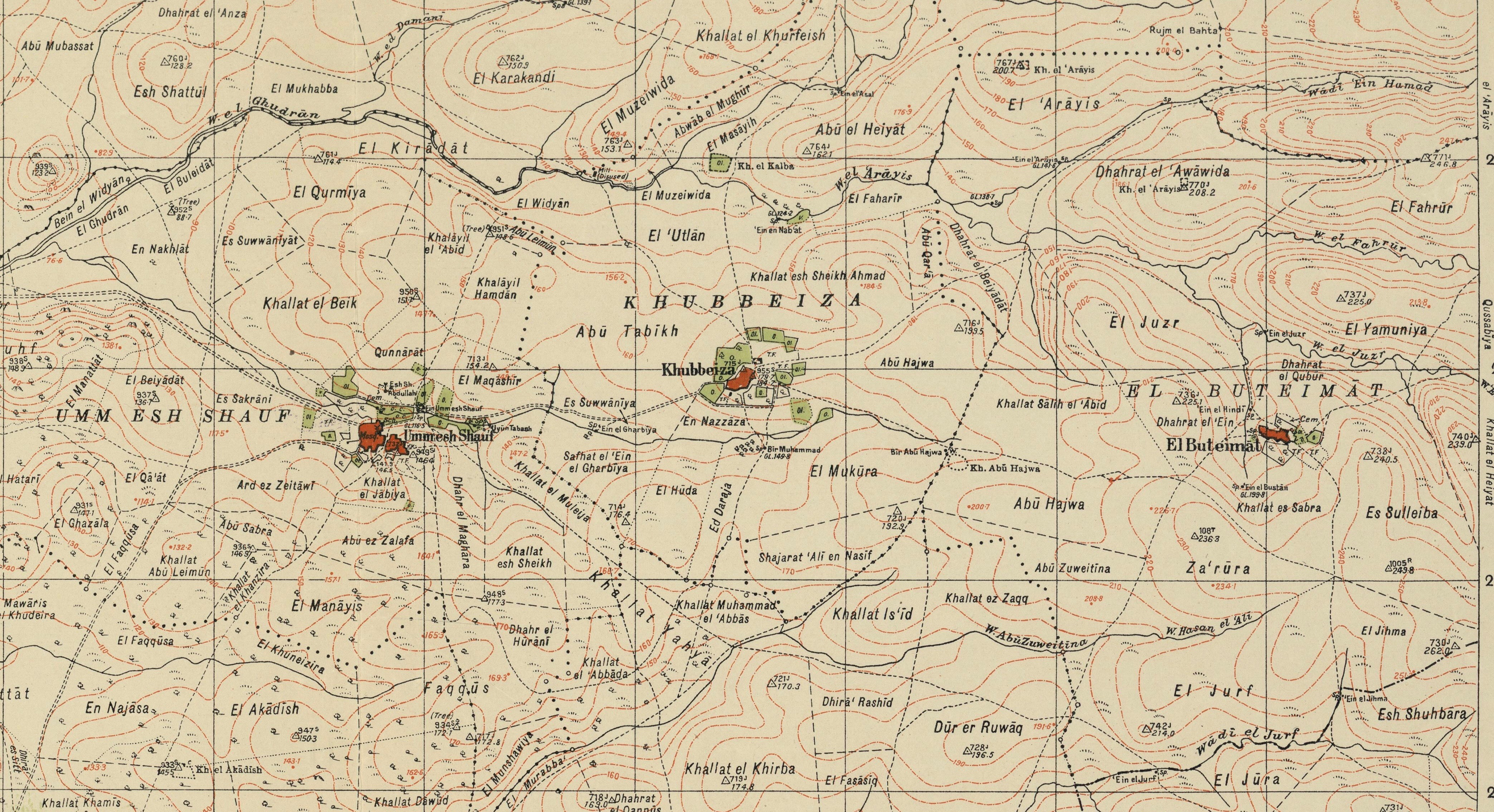
Al-Butaymat 1942 1:20,000

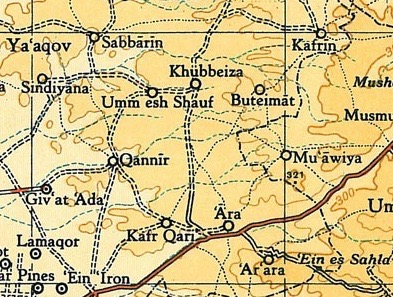
Al-Butaymat 1945 1:250,000

=== 1948 and aftermath ===
Benny Morris gives May 1948 as depopulation date, and "Fear of being caught up in the fighting" as the cause, but with a question mark.

In 1992 the village site was described: "The site is fenced in, overgrown with grass and cactuses. There are no traces of houses except for adobe bricks scattered around the site. Most of the surrounding lands are used as grazing areas, but some of them are cultivated."

== Bibliography ==
- Avneri, Aryeh L. (1984). The claim of dispossession: Jewish land-settlement and the Arabs, 1878-1948 (Illustrated ed.). Transaction Publishers. ISBN 978-0-87855-964-0.
- Barron, J. B., ed. (1923). Palestine: Report and General Abstracts of the Census of 1922. Government of Palestine.
- Benvenisti, M. (2002). Sacred landscape: the buried history of the Holy Land since 1948 (Illustrated ed.). University of California Press. ISBN 978-0-520-23422-2.
- Conder, C.R.; Kitchener, H.H. (1882). The Survey of Western Palestine: Memoirs of the Topography, Orography, Hydrography, and Archaeology. Vol. 2. London: Committee of the Palestine Exploration Fund.
- Department of Statistics (1945). Village Statistics, April, 1945. Government of Palestine.
- Hadawi, S. (1970). Village Statistics of 1945: A Classification of Land and Area ownership in Palestine. Palestine Liberation Organization Research Center. Archived from the original on 2018-12-08.
- Khalidi, W. (1992). All That Remains: The Palestinian Villages Occupied and Depopulated by Israel in 1948. Washington D.C.: Institute for Palestine Studies. ISBN 0-88728-224-5.
- Mills, E., ed. (1932). Census of Palestine 1931. Population of Villages, Towns and Administrative Areas. Jerusalem: Government of Palestine.
- Morris, B. (2004). The Birth of the Palestinian Refugee Problem Revisited. Cambridge University Press. ISBN 978-0-521-00967-6.
- Palmer, E.H. (1881). The Survey of Western Palestine: Arabic and English Name Lists Collected During the Survey by Lieutenants Conder and Kitchener, R. E. Transliterated and Explained by E.H. Palmer. Committee of the Palestine Exploration Fund.
- Yazbak, M. (1998). Haifa in the late Ottoman period, 1864-1914: a Muslim town in transition (Illustrated ed.). BRILL. ISBN 978-90-04-11051-9.
