= Manasseh Hills =

Geographical region in northern Israel

Coordinates: 32°35′N 35°8′E

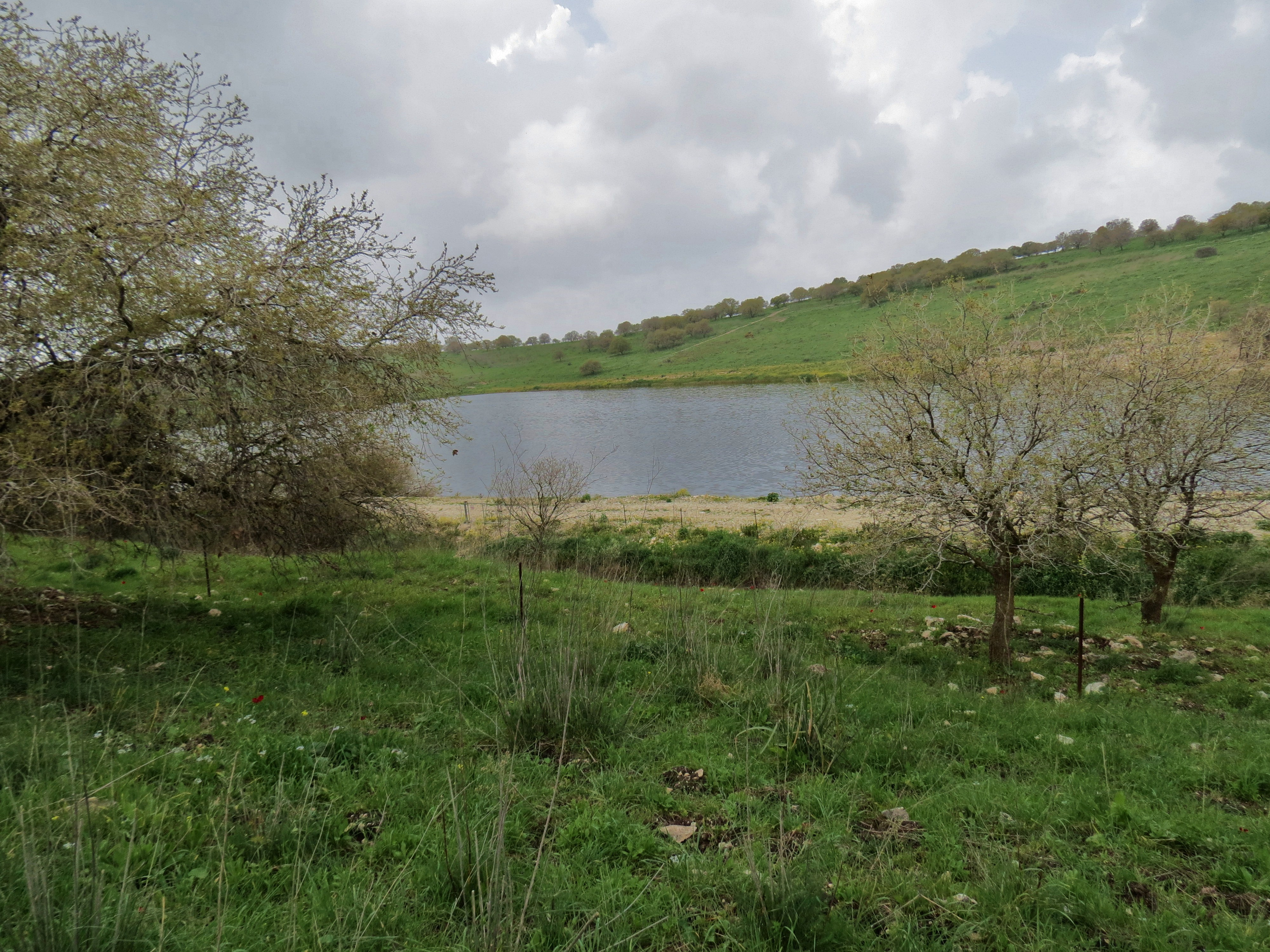
Reservoir in Ramot Menashe

The Manasseh Hills or hill country of Manasseh, directly derived from Hebrew: Menashe Heights (Hebrew: רָמוֹת מְנַשֶּׁה, romanized: Ramot Menashe, lit. 'Manasseh Heights'), called Bilad ar-Ruha in Arabic, meaning "Land of Winds", is a geographical region in northern Israel, located on the Carmel Range, between Mount Carmel and Mount Amir/Umm al-Fahm.

== Etymology ==
The hill country of Manasseh or Manasseh hill country, sometimes fully capitalised, is named for its location within the allotment of the biblical Tribe of Manasseh, itself named after its biblical forefather, Manasseh or Manasses.

== History ==
During the Ottoman Period, the Menashe Hills formed part of Turabay Emirate (1517–1683), which encompassed also the Jezreel Valley, Haifa, Jenin, Beit She'an Valley, Mount Carmel, northern Jabal Nablus, and the northern part of the Sharon plain.

During the late Ottoman period, the largest dispersal in the Mannaseh Hills was of people from Egypt, with another significant group being those from Hebron (Khalilia). These migrants likely settled in the area following the withdrawal of Ibrahim Pasha's forces and sustained themselves through vassalship in the local effendi communities or by residing in temporary or seasonal hamlets. Despite this immigration, the area was not very populated.

== Geography ==
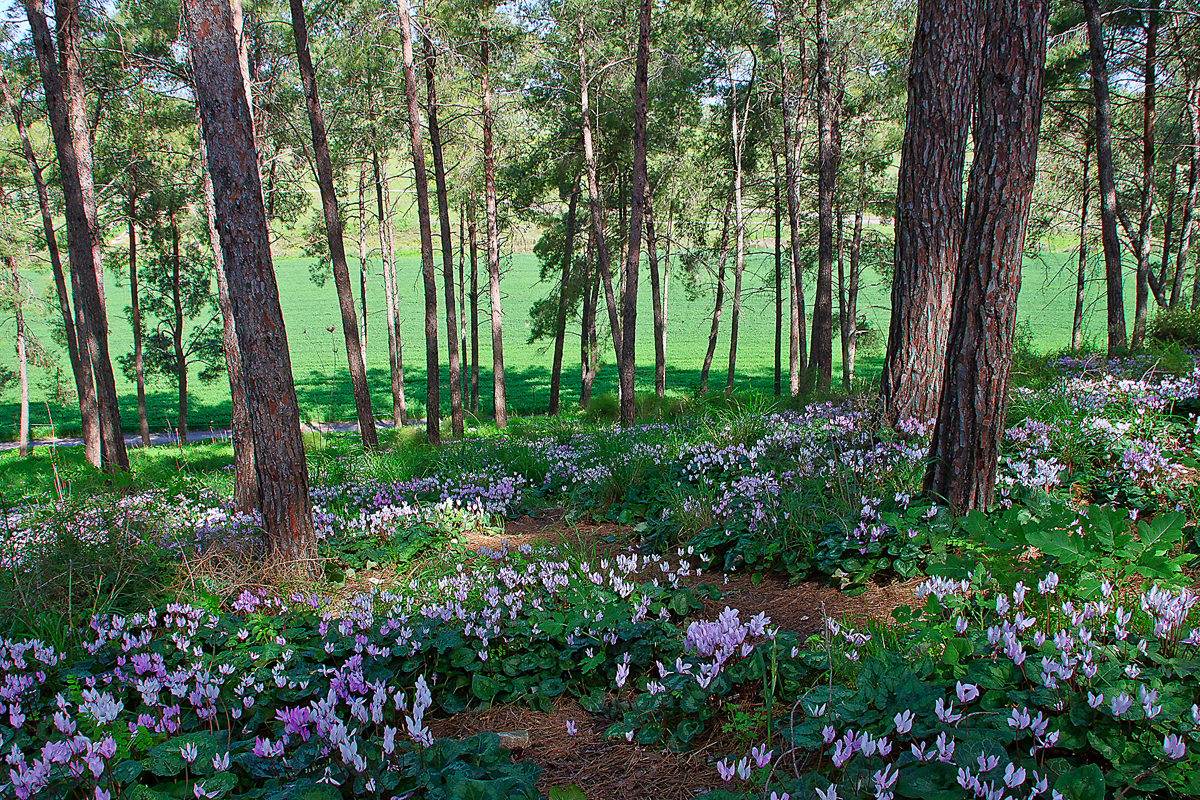
Ramot Menashe woodlands

While Manasseh hill country (Ramat Menashe) is part of the mountain range, it is just 200 m above sea level on average, and peaks at 400 m. The plateau is bordered by the Jezreel Valley to the northeast, Wadi Milh (the Yokne'am Stream) to the northwest, Wadi Ara to the southeast, and the Nadiv Valley to the southwest.

The Manasseh Hill Country, known in Hebrew as Ramot Menashe, was officially added to UNESCO's World Network of Biosphere Reserves in 2011. The region was credited with encompassing "a mosaic of ecological systems that represent the Mediterranean Basin's version of the global evergreen sclerophyllous forests, woodlands and scrub ecosystem types."

=== Important Bird Area ===
A 2,500 ha tract of agricultural country with oak trees, on the western slopes of Mount Carmel, some 5 km from the coast, has been recognised as an Important Bird Area (IBA) by BirdLife International because it supports a population of lesser kestrels, with some 40 breeding pairs estimated in 1991.

== Localities ==
Localities in Ramot Menashe include

- Dalia, a kibbutz
- Ein HaEmek, a community settlement
- Ein HaShofet, a kibbutz
- Gal'ed, a kibbutz
- Ramat HaShofet, a kibbutz
- Ramot Menashe, a kibbutz

== See also ==
- Geography of Israel
