= Ramot Menashe =

- The kibbutz entrance

- Location within Israel Location within Jezreel Valley region of Israel
- Coordinates: 32°35′48″N 35°3′26″E
- Country: Israel
- District: Northern
- Subdistrict: Jezreel
- Council: Megiddo
- Affiliation: Kibbutz Movement
- Founded: July 1948
- Founder: Holocaust Survivors and Demobilized Jewish Home Army Members
- Population (2024): 1,371
- Website: Ramot Menashe

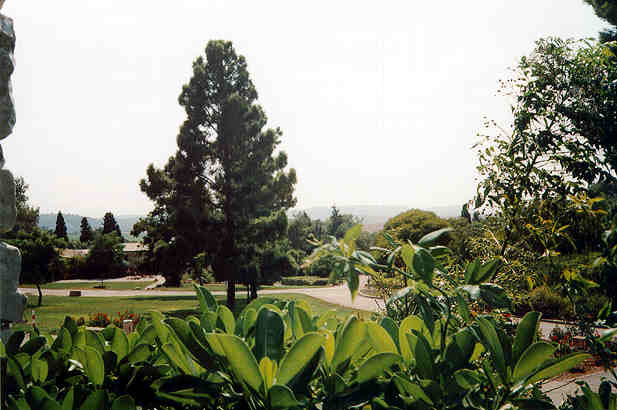
View from the dining hall

Ramot Menashe (Hebrew: רָמוֹת מְנַשֶּׁה, lit. Menashe Heights) is a kibbutz in northern Israel. Located on the Menashe plateau between the Carmel mountain range and the Jezreel Valley, it falls under the jurisdiction of Megiddo Regional Council. In 2024, it had a population of 1,371.

== Geography ==
Ramot Menashe is located in the Menashe Heights, after which the kibbutz is named. The kibbutz is surrounded by open terrain, mostly agricultural lands worked by members of the kibbutz. The main traffic routes connecting the kibbutz to its surroundings are Highway 6 and Route 672.

According to Benny Morris, the kibbutz is located on land close to Daliyat al-Rawha', a depopulated Palestinian village, while Walid Khalidi notes that the land of Ramot Menashe is also near the former village of Sabbarin.

== History ==
In 1946, a gar'in of the Hashomer Hatzair movement, made up of Holocaust survivors and Jewish insurgents from Austria and Poland was established. The gar'in was named "Bone HaNegev" (builders of the Negev) and the members planned to build a settlement in the Negev. In April 1946, the members of the gar'in boarded a ship in La Spezia, Italy along with 1,400 other Jewish holocaust survivors, but the British discovered the ship and prevented it from sailing. The citizens of La Spezia sent food and aid to the ship and put pressure on the British to allow the ship to sail to Palestine, and eventually the British allowed the ship to sail. On 18 May 1946, the members arrived in Palestine. Despite their desire to settle in the Negev, they were sent to Ein HaShofet and Dalia for training and on 29 July 1948, they settled as a kibbutz, numbering 64 members. The kibbutz served as a military outpost during the 1948 Arab–Israeli War, and after the war, the members moved to a nearby location. They started clearing the land and planting trees. Living conditions were harsh during the early days, when the members lived in barracks and tents, disconnected from water and electricity. In November 1948, the kibbutz adopted the name "Ramot Menashe".

During the early years, the kibbutz absorbed several gar'ins of Hashomer Hatzair from South America. In 1950, the kibbutz absorbed a group 95 Hashomer Hatzair members from Chile and Uruguay. In 1955, another group of 23 Uruguayan immigrants arrived, and in 1962 another 31 members of a youth group called "Eshet".

In the 1980s, the kibbutz entered an economic crisis as part of the national bank stock crisis. The economic crisis ended in the 1990s, when a strict recovery plan was activated: unprofitable economic sectors were closed, some of the kibbutz's assets were sold to private hands, the community budget was cut and a gradual process of privatization took place. The kibbutz switched the traditional collective structure and moved to a "safety net" structure.

In the early 2000s, the kibbutz built a new neighborhood of 138 households. The residents of the neighborhood are not members of the kibbutz, but enjoy the kibbutz's community services. Thus, the kibbutz reached the limit of households per Israel's National Outline Plan no. 35, which limits the maximum number of households in the kibbutz to 400 until 2020. In 2011, during the nationwide social justice protest, the members of the kibbutz demanded that the government will release land around the kibbutz for its expansion. The main motive was to allow previous members of the kibbutz to return and build their homes in it.

== Economy ==
The main source of Ramot Menashe's profits comes from industrial activity, while some agricultural sectors are active, such as cowsheds, Avocado groves and field crops. Tourism and entertainment also developed in the kibbutz.

Until the 1980s, Ramot Menashe's economy was based on agriculture: crops, plantations, cotton and livestock. In parallel, an effort was made to develop industrial activity, which led to the establishment of the Arad factory. The social structure was collective, where all members received the same salary for different roles and the kibbutz owned most of the property and businesses. After an economic crisis in the 1990s, the kibbutz underwent a series of privatizations and reforms, including the cancellation of equal salaries and the reducing of the collective structure to a social safety net.

The kibbutz owns part of the Arad Ltd. company which manufactures water-meters in a factory located in the kibbutz. The company is run by the kibbutz in partnership with Kibbutz Dalia (the company is based in Dalia). In 2004, the company was issued in the Tel Aviv Stock Exchange. The company owns several other minor companies under the "Arad Group".

=== Tourism ===
The Kibbutz operates 32 rooms for vacation rental. The kibbutz used to operate a night club called The Terminal which attracted people from all over the surrounding region. In 2010, the club was closed and a similar club, bearing the same name was built near the Krayot, with no connection to the kibbutz.

=== Sport ===
The kibbutz has a football team called Hapoel Ramot Menashe Megiddo F.C. (originally named Hapoel Eyal Ramot Menashe after kibbutz member Eyal Shapira). It represents all the settlements of the Megiddo Regional Council and plays in the Second Division (Northern Second District). The pitch is located within the boundaries of Kibbutz Ramot Menashe. The team has been coached by kibbutz member Shlomo Liran for more than 30 years, and the team currently has four members from the kibbutz. The pitch is known by the members of the kibbutz "Eucalyptus Stadium" due to the trees surrounding it. In 2011 a stand was built for the group's fans and in 2015 roofing work was completed with a new roof. The team's highest achievement was in 2009/10, when the team qualified for the first division in its history for the first division and at the end of one season was relegated to the second division north, where it plays to this day.
