= Gal'ed =

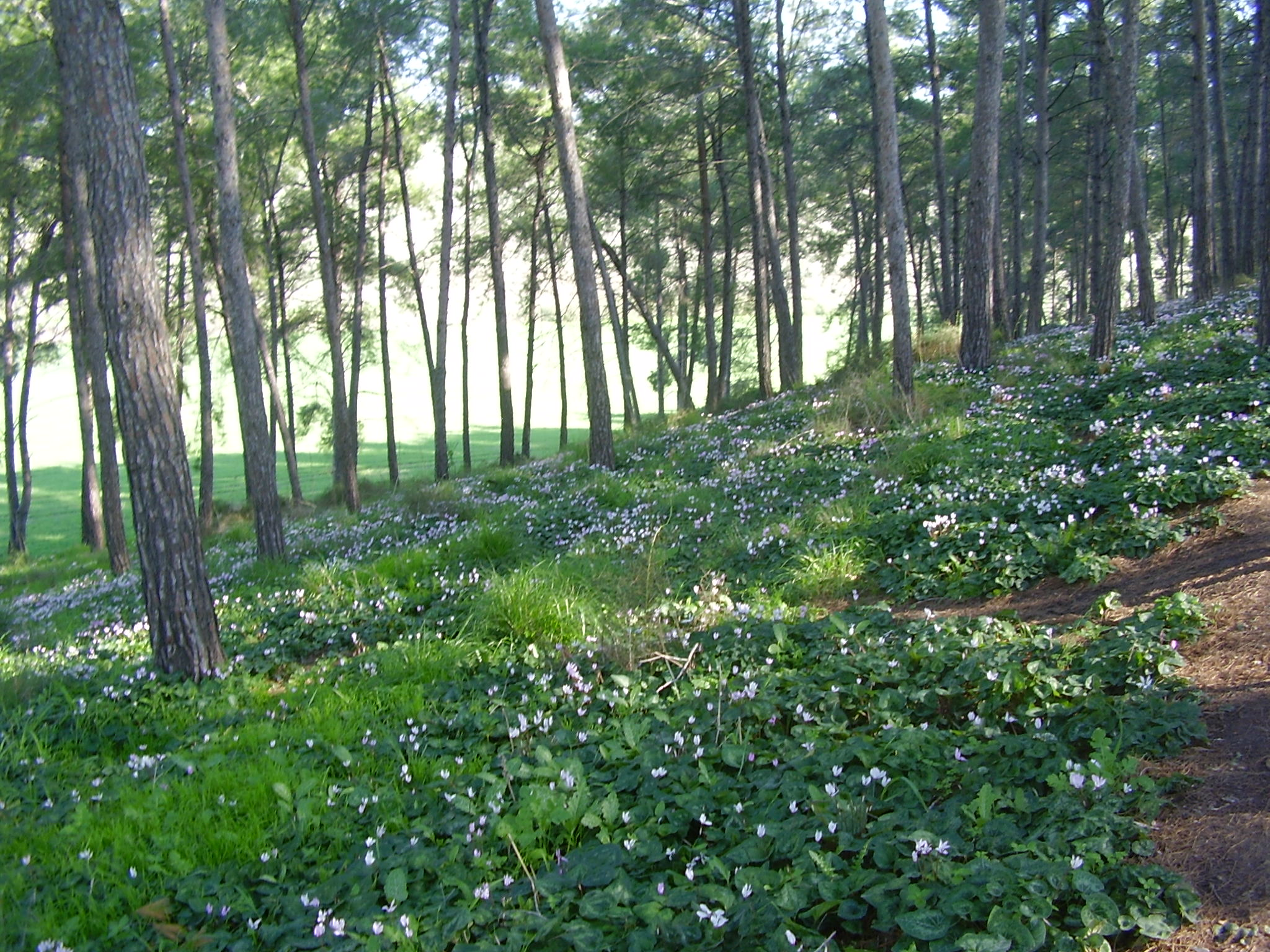

- Location within Jezreel Valley region of Israel
- Coordinates: 32°33′23″N 35°4′37″E
- Country: Israel
- District: Northern
- Subdistrict: Jezreel
- Council: Megiddo
- Affiliation: Kibbutz Movement
- Founded: 1945
- Founder: German Jews
- Population (2024): 607

Gal'ed (Hebrew: גַּלְעֵד, lit. 'Monument') is a kibbutz in northern Israel. Located in the Menashe Heights with an area of 14,500 dunams, it falls under the jurisdiction of Megiddo Regional Council. In 2024 it had a population of 607.

== History ==
Kibbutz Gal'ed was established in 1945 by a gar'in of German HaBonim members which had formed in 1938. Because the land on which the kibbutz lies was bought with money donated by Isaac (Yitzhak) Ochberg (1879–1938), a South African philanthropist, Keren HaYesod wanted the kibbutz named "Even Yitzhak" (lit. 'Stone of Yitzhak'). However, eventually the kibbutz members had their way and the kibbutz was named Gal'ed (lit. 'monument or memorial') to commemorate friends and family of the founders who had died in the Holocaust. The land was located near the Palestinian village of Al-Butaymat, which was depopulated in 1948.

Amongst the founders were the couple Giora and Senetta Yoseftal, both of whom were later members of the Knesset, with Giora serving in several ministerial portfolios.
