= Ein HaShofet =

Kibbutz in northern Israel

Ein HaShofet: עֵין הַשּׁוֹפֵט (Hebrew)
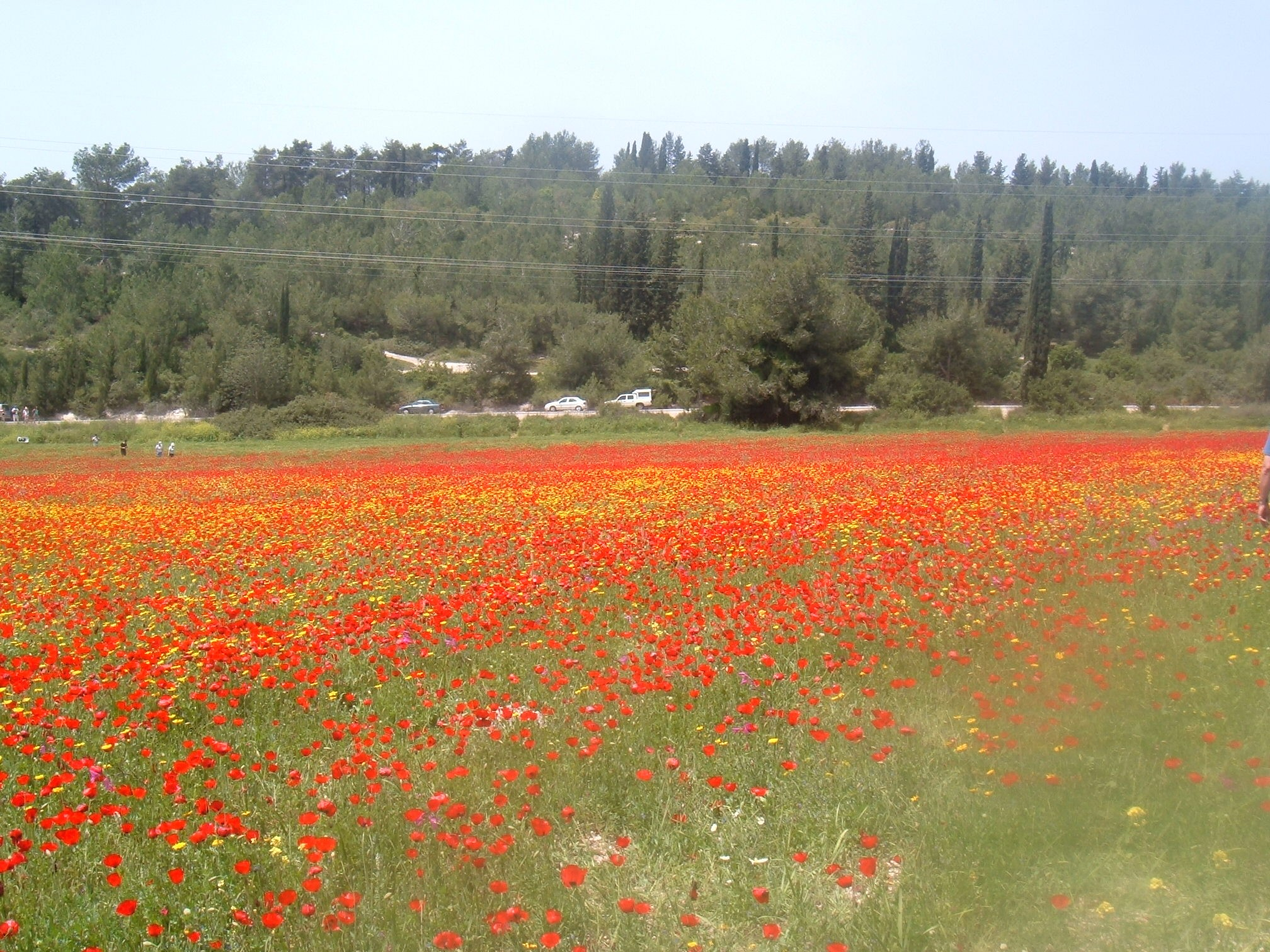
- Etymology: Spring of the Judge
- Location within Jezreel Valley region of Israel Location within Israel
- Coordinates: 32°35′45″N 35°6′04″E
- Grid position: 160/222 PAL
- Country: Israel
- District: Northern
- Subdistrict: Jezreel
- Council: Megiddo
- Affiliation: Kibbutz Movement
- Founded: 5 July 1937
- Founder: Polish and American Hashomer Hatzair Members
- Population (2024): 967
- Website: www.keh.co.il

Ein HaShofet (Hebrew: עֵין הַשּׁוֹפֵט, lit. Spring of the Judge) is a kibbutz in northern Israel. Located in the Menashe Heights region around 25 km southeast of the city of Haifa, close to Yokneam, it falls under the jurisdiction of Megiddo Regional Council. In 2024 it had a population of 967.

Ein HaShofet was established by two Hashomer Hatzair groups from Poland and Highland Mills, New York. They first settled the hill of Jo'ara in 1937 and moved to the current location in 1938. "Ein HaShofet," literally, Judge's Spring, was named in honor of United States Supreme Court Justice Louis D. Brandeis (1856–1941), who played a leading role in the American Zionist movement. There is a flowing spring nearby the kibbutz.

The kibbutz owns three industrial companies which produce metal parts, mostly for vehicles, and lighting products on a global scale.

== Geography ==
Ein HaShofet is located on the Menashe Heights, 5 kilometers south of the city of Yokneam Illit. Other places near Ein HaShofet include the kibbutzim of Ramat HaShofet, Dalia and the hill of Jo'ara. The kibbutz is accessed through the 6954 and 6953 roads, connected to Highway 66 and regional route 672.

== History ==
=== British Mandate ===
The founders of the kibbutz were from two Hashomer Hatzair groups. The first group, "Banir," was from Częstochowa, Poland. The group formed in 1931 and arrived in Mandatory Palestine in 1935. It received farm training in Ein HaHoresh. The other group was from Highland Mills, New York. They formed a group in 1922 and did their training at Mishmar HaEmek in 1931. This group started out with 17 members, reaching 30 in 1933. In May 1934, the two groups united in Hadera under the name "Banir-America" and worked there together.

The initial location of the kibbutz was the hill of Jo'ara, about one kilometer from the current location of the kibbutz. It was owned by an Effendi from a family called Salah, residing in Haifa, and was populated by Arab tenant farmers. In 1936, the Jewish National Fund bought the land from the effendi and paid each sharecropper for their evacuation. The funds for the deal were raised by Louis D. Brandeis, a United States Supreme Court Justice lawyer, and a prominent Zionist figure. The Americans donated 70,000 USD for the cause, with 50,000 coming from Brandeis himself. The kibbutz was named in his honor.

On 5 July 1937 some of the members departed from Mishmar HaEmek, escorted by the Haganah, and arrived to the hill of Jo'ara. The kibbutz was established a part of the Tower and Stockade settlement drive. Built on JNF land with the help of the Keren Hayesod company, it was the first Jewish settlement on the Menashe Heights. Their departure was celebrated in Mishmar HaEmek, from where they brought dismantled structures, equipment for building a wall, and trees for planting. The climb was done on foot, as there was no paved road to the top of the hill. During the following winter the way to the hill was blocked and the members paved a new access road.

The members stayed on the hill for one year before moving to the current and final location of the kibbutz. They left the hill of Jo'ara after realizing it was too small. It was handed to the Haganah militia. The construction of, the first permanent building took place in June 1938 and in October the rest of the members from Hadera and Jo'ara joined the kibbutz in its final location. Many members joined the Haganah paramilitary organization and the Notrim Jewish police force.

In 1945, Ein HaShofet had a population of 320, all Jews. It was noted that it was the village formerly named Ji'ara (i.e. Jo'ara). Despite a lack of water and hilly difficult reclamation, in 1948, with a population of 450, they "were a successful mixed hill farm with orchards, dry cereals, dairy products, sheep herding and chicken farming."

During the Jewish insurgency in Mandatory Palestine, Ein HaShofet housed a factory for explosives used by the Jewish militia against the British.

During the 1948 Arab-Israeli war, the Ein HaShofet villagers helped to defeat Fawzi al-Qawuqji's forces after their April 1948 attack on Mishmar HaEmek.

=== State of Israel ===
Until 1962, the kibbutz absorbed five other groups. Two of them were made of Holocaust survivors and the other are youth groups from Israel.

== Economy ==
The primary component of Ein HaShofet's economy is its industry with three working factories in the kibbutz. According to the 2008 national census, 43% of the workers work in the kibbutz's industrial sector. The secondary component and historically the center of the kibbutz life is agriculture, which employs 20 members of the kibbutz in five different sectors.

=== Industry ===
The kibbutz owns three industrial companies through the Ein-Hashofet Industries Group.

- Mivrag Cold Forming Technology is a company that produces cold-formed steel components. In the local market, Mivrag supplies agriculture, industrial, high-tech and wholesale companies. In the worldwide market, Mivrag supplies automative companies. With the establishment of the factory in 1952, Mivrag manufactured wooden screws. In the 1960s and 1970s the factory expanded to other products and moved to use metals. In 1987 the factory moved to its current facility. The company began to thrive since the 1990s, expanding its sales to Asia, North America and Europe.
- Eltam is a company that produces lighting products.
- MAG Ltd. (Mivrag Automative Group) was established in 1999 and produces assemblies for the automotive industry.

=== Agriculture ===
- Dairy farming is the first agriculture sector of the kibbutz, beginning already in 1938 with the move to the kibbutz's current location. The dairy has over 200 dairy cows and produces several million liters of milk per year.
- Cattle farming began in the 1950s in order to exploit lands that couldn't be used for farming. The cattle sector is owned in partnership with kibbutz Mishmar HaEmek (Ein HaShofet owns about 70% of it). The sector struggles to exist due to low profits. In addition to cattle growing, the kibbutz has a successful cattle fattening facility.
- Orchards are today used for Avocado growing. The avocado growing began in the mid 1970s. In the early days of the kibbutz, plum trees were the main products. In the 1940s it were vineyards, followed by apples, peaches and pears in the 1950s.
- Poultry farming in the kibbutz is centered since 1971 on Chicken fattening.
- The field crops sector in the kibbutz is relatively small but profitable. It is centered on wheat and cotton.

== Archaeology ==
Numerous burial caves have been discovered at Dhaharat el-Marshafa, a site situated to the east of Ein HaShofet. Within one of them, a funerary inscription in either Hebrew or Aramaic was found carved into the wall, adorned with traces of red paint. Another discovery from Ein HaShofet is an octagonal bronze ring engraved with Samaritan letters, although only a portion of it remains legible. It is speculated that this ring may have been used for mystical or magical purposes.

The local museum displays amphoras with Greek dipintos dating back to the 1st and 2nd centuries AD.

== Gallery ==
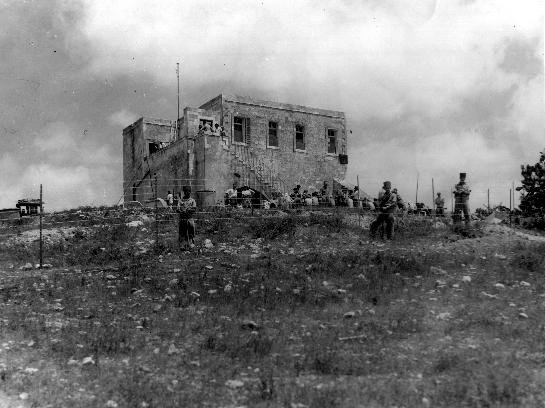
The hill of Jo'ara, July 1937

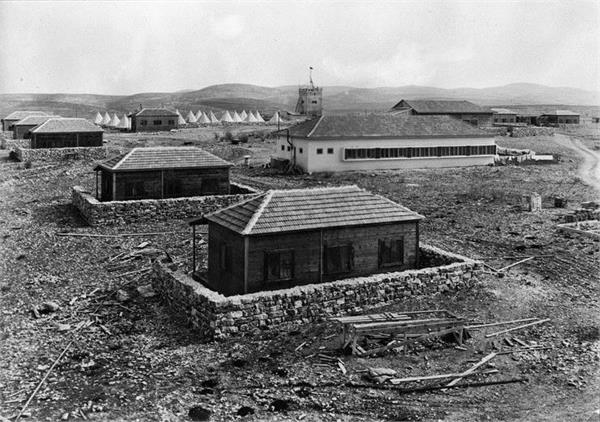
Ein HaShofet 1937

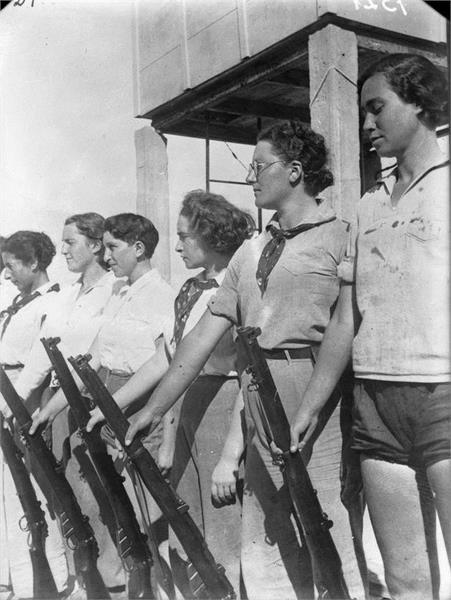
Ein HaShofet 1937

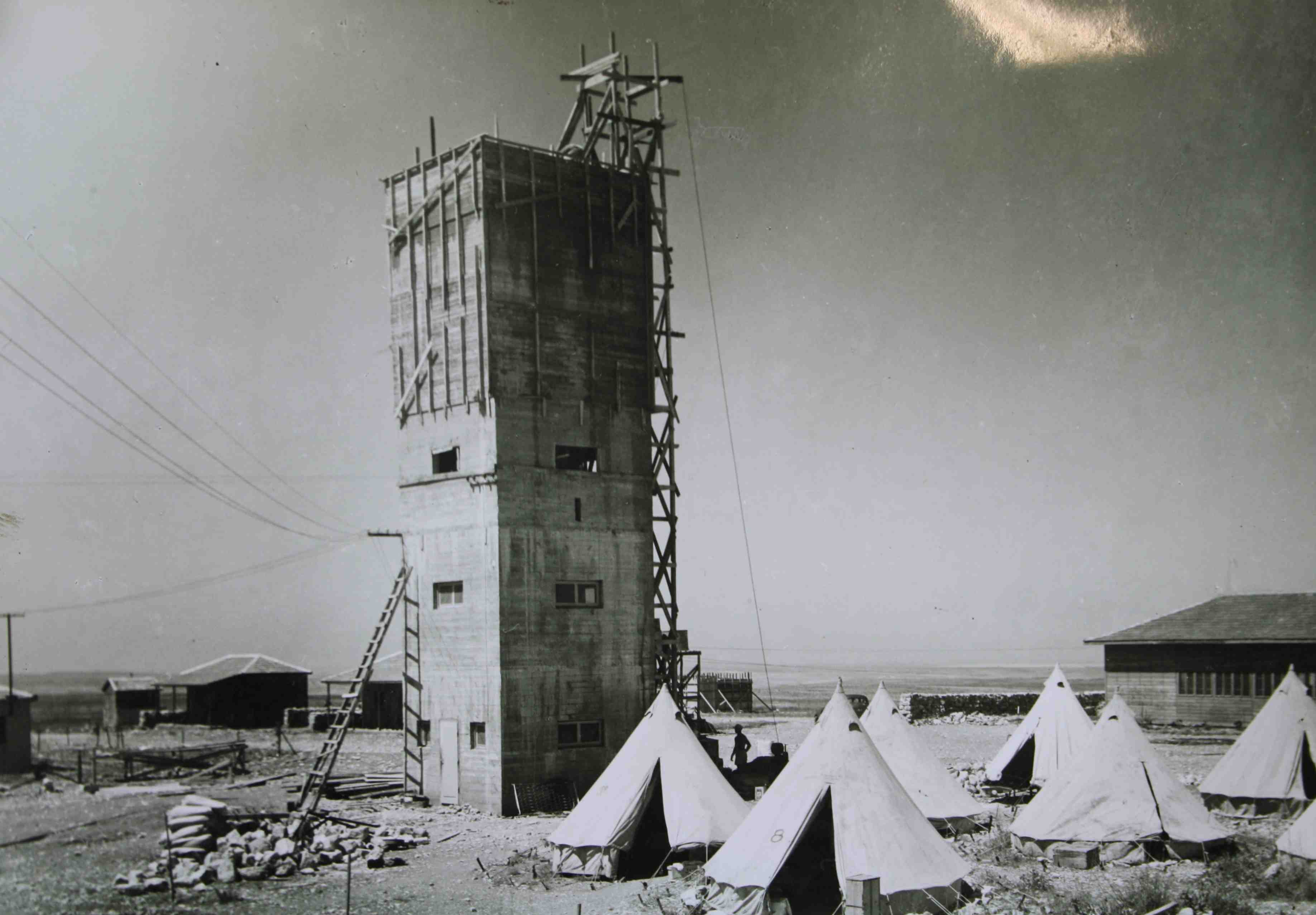
Ein HaShofet tower and stockade, 1938

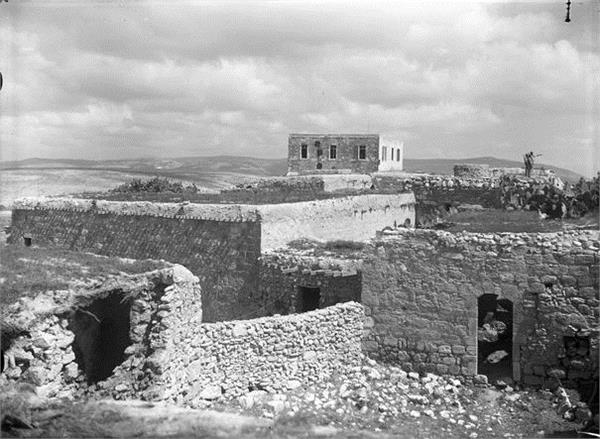
Ein HaShofet Ji’ara village 1939

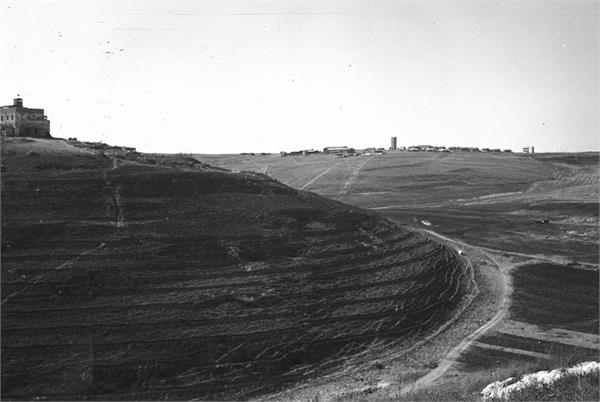
Ein HaShofet showing first location 1939

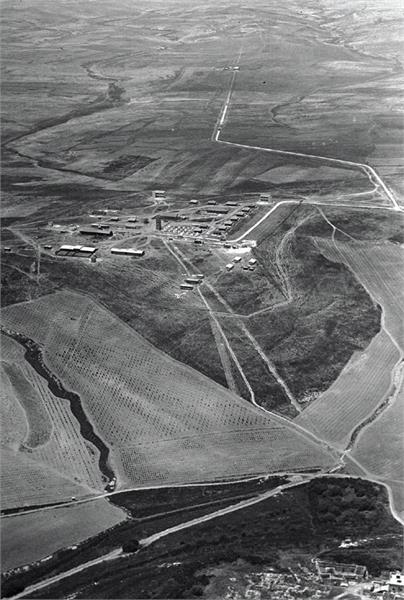
Ein HaShofet 1939

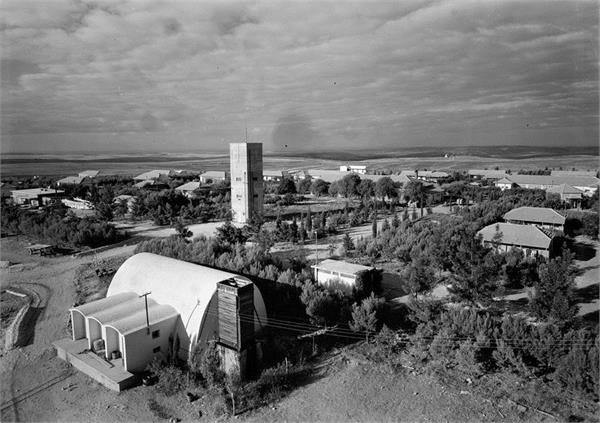
Ein HaShofet 1945
