= Ramat HaShofet =

Kibbutz in northern Israel

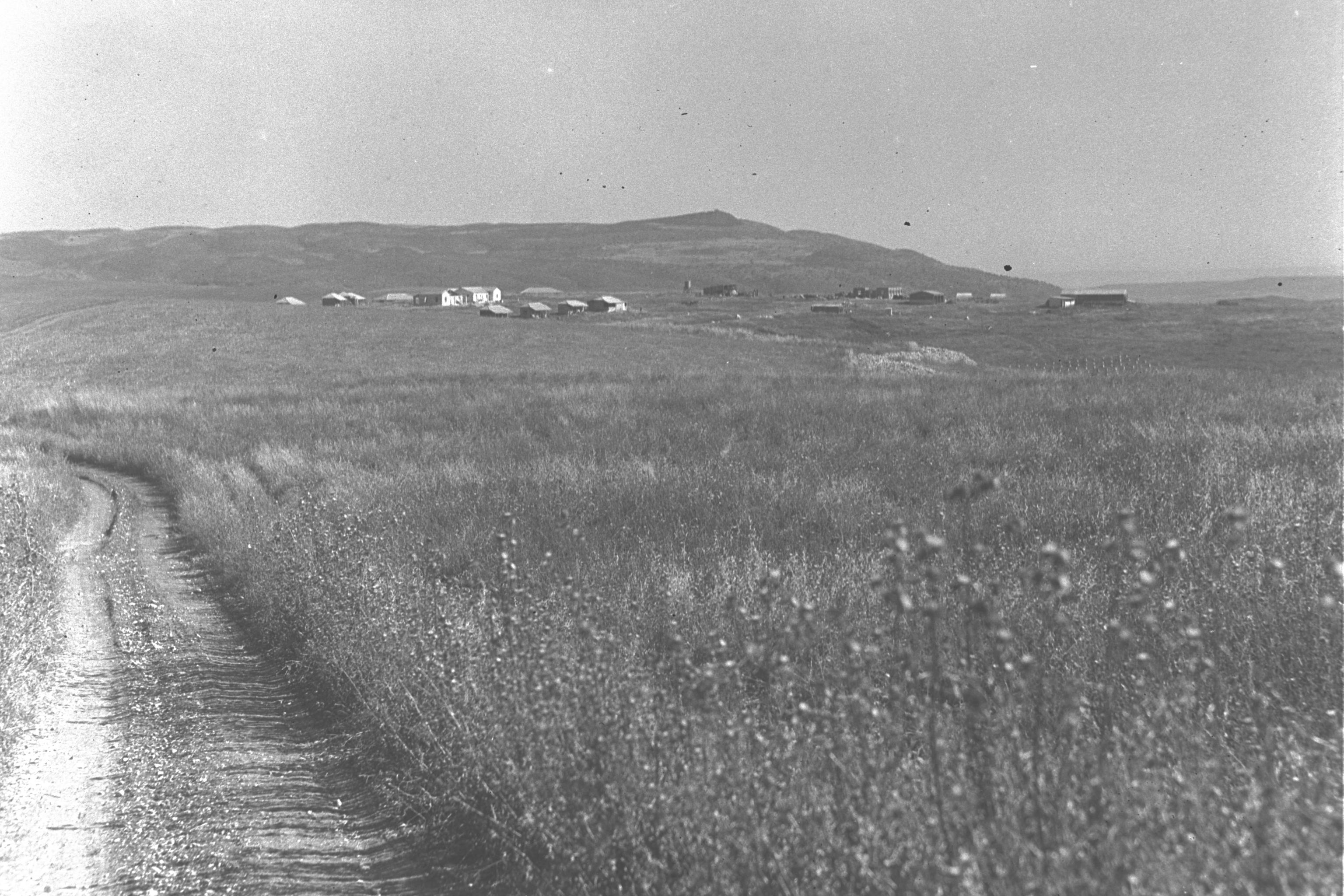

- Location within Jezreel Valley region of Israel
- Coordinates: 32°36′39″N 35°5′42″E
- Country: Israel
- District: Northern
- Subdistrict: Jezreel
- Council: Megiddo
- Affiliation: Kibbutz Movement
- Founded: 2 November 1941
- Founder: Polish and Lithuanian Hashomer Hatzair members
- Population (2024): 1,129
- Website: www.ramathashofet.co.il

Ramat HaShofet (Hebrew: רָמַת הַשּׁוֹפֵט, lit. 'Judge Heights') is a kibbutz in northern Israel. Located in the Menashe Heights, it falls under the jurisdiction of Megiddo Regional Council. In 2024 it had a population of 1,129.

== Etymology ==
"Ramat HaShofet" translates literally as "Heights of the Judge." The village was named for American federal judge Julian William Mack (1866–1943), an American Zionist leader who served as president of the Palestine Endowment Funds. He was also honorary president of the World Jewish Congress and president of the American Jewish Congress and Zionist Organization of America. He attended the Versailles Conference as an advocate for a Jewish state in Palestine.

== Geography ==
Ramat HaShofet is located in the region of Ramot Menashe in northern Israel. The Shofet River flows near the kibbutz and in one of its rivulets, Ulmusim Stream, there is a small park. About 400 meters northeast to the kibbutz there is a spring.

== History ==
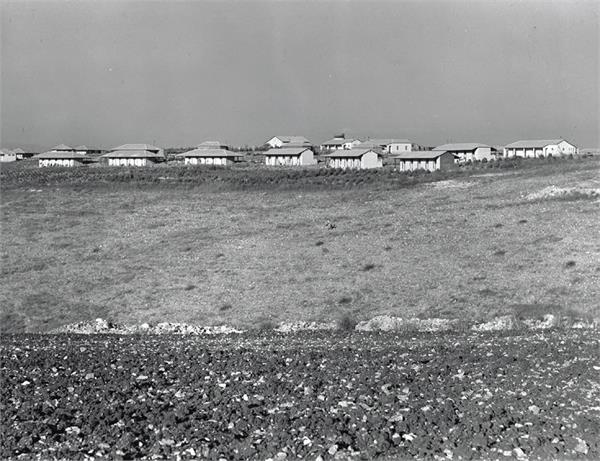
Ramat HaShofet 1945

In 1934 two gar'ins of Hashomer Hatzair movement, Mitzpe HaSharon from Lithuania and LaShihrur from Poland arrived to Mandatory Palestine and sent to Mishmar HaEmek for qualifications. Mitzpe HaSharon was sent to work in Ra'anana while LaShihrur was sent to Rehovot.

The Gar'in of Mitzpe HaSharon (lit. "Sharon lookout") was settled on a 20 duman hill owned by the Jewish National Fund some 4 kilometers from Ra'anana. The small kibbutz, which has 80 members in 1937 operated a vegetable farm, but it could not provide work for all of the members, so they also worked in Ra'anana and Kfar Nahman (today part of Ra'anana). The small kibbutz had no road connection and was surrounded by land owned by Arabs. In 1940, 60 members of the kibbutz worked in Ra'anana.

The gar'in of LaShihrur (lit. "To Liberation") settled on a hill near Rehovot's railway station. The kibbutz had poor transportation and the residents received complaints due to their work close to the railway. The elders of the small kibbutz worked in Rehovot and their children studied in there as well. In 1943, before the departure of all the members to Ramat HaShofet, the kibbutz had 186 members, including 46 children.

The two groups united and established the kibbutz on 2 November 1941 with support from Keren Hayesod, on land owned by the Jewish National Fund. Jews from Bulgaria, Hungary, Romania and Argentina later joined the kibbutz. The kibbutz was established first by a group of 20 members who arrived and started working the land.

In the early years the members worked to clear and prepare the ground for agriculture. They developed good relations with the Arab village of al-Rihaniyya. In 1942 the first permanent structures were built and in 1943 a carpentry workshop was built. In that same year, the rest of LaShihrur came from Rehovot and settled in the new kibbutz. After al-Rihaniyya became depopulated in the 1948 Arab-Israeli War, Ramat HaShofet and Ein HaEmek have used the lands nearby.

In 1954 the kibbutz was connected to the national water supply system run by Mekorot.

In 2003 the kibbutz was privatized and in 2005 new families moved in.

In September 2010 the first section of a new neighborhood called HaSadeh (The Field) was completed. The second and third sections were completed between 2012 and 2013. The neighborhood has 61 houses with 500 square metres (5,400 sq ft) per each house.

In September 2020, the kibbutz briefly changed its name to Ramat HaShofetet ("The [Female] Judge's Heights") in homage to Ruth Bader Ginsburg, who had died earlier in the same month.

== Notable people ==
- Yochai Halevi
- Neta Lavi

== Websites ==
- Village website
- All the Ramat-Shoftim in the world
