= Dalia, Israel =

Kibbutz in northern Israel

Dalia: דַּלִיָּה (Hebrew)
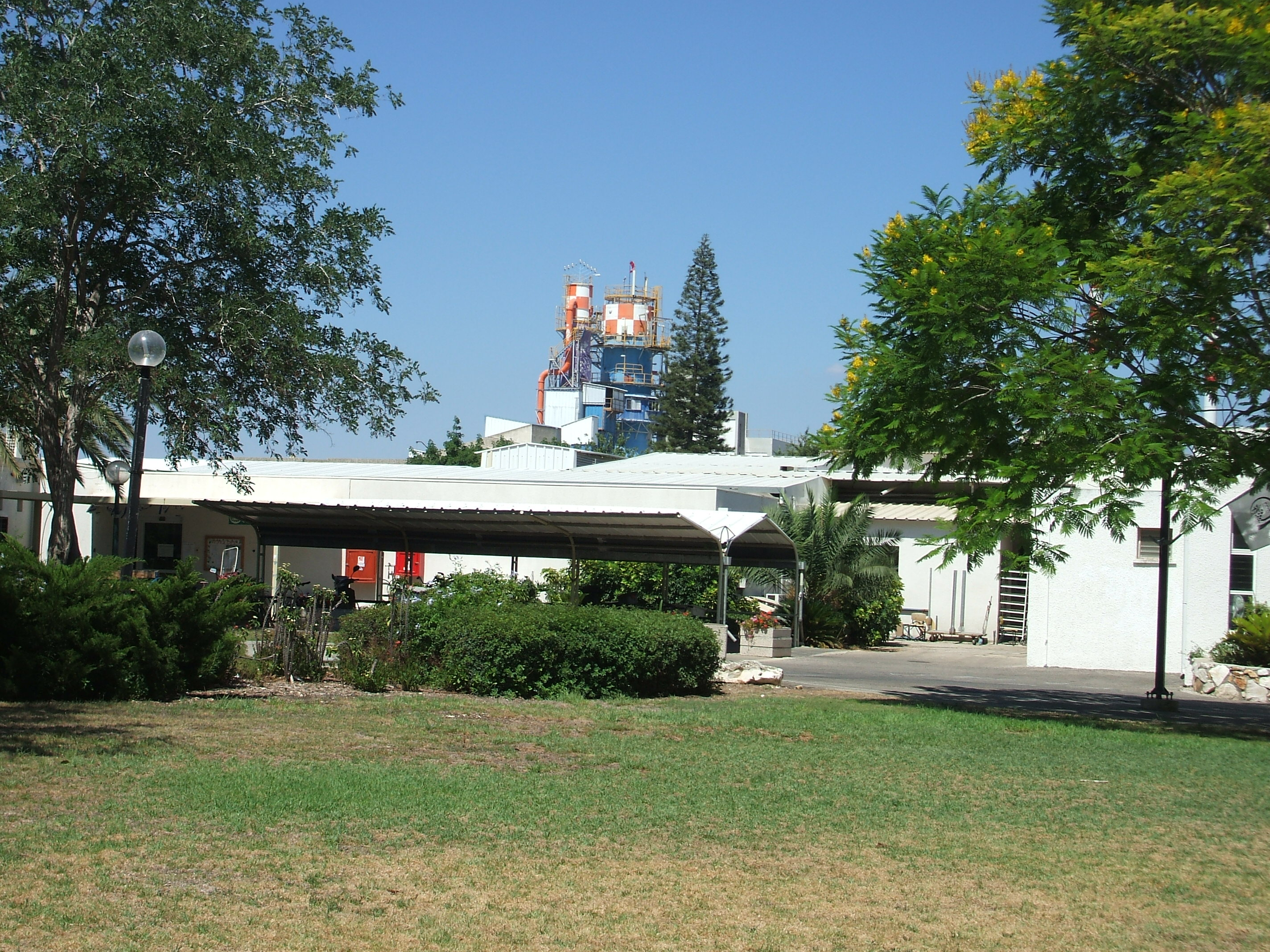

- Location within Jezreel Valley region of Israel Location within Israel
- Coordinates: 32°35′25″N 35°04′39″E
- Country: Israel
- District: Northern
- Subdistrict: Jezreel
- Council: Megiddo
- Affiliation: Kibbutz Movement
- Founded: 1 May 1939
- Founder: Hashomer Hatzair
- Population (2024): 882
- Website: www.dalia.org.il

Dalia (Hebrew: דַּלִיָּה) is a kibbutz in northern Israel. Located in the Galilee about 30 km southeast of Haifa, it falls under the jurisdiction of Megiddo Regional Council. The kibbutz was established in 1939. As of 2024 it had a population of 882.

== History ==
Kibbutz Dalia was founded by members of two Jewish groups affiliated with the Hashomer Hatzair movement who moved to Mandatory Palestine in 1933. The first group, "Ba-Ma'ale" (Hebrew: "במעלה"), was composed of Romanian Jews. They underwent agricultural training in Romania before making Aliyah and settling in Hadar Ramatayim, Magdiel (now part of Hod HaSharon) and Kfar Malal. The other group, "Ba-Mifneh" (Hebrew: "במפנה"), was composed of German Jews. Their agricultural training took place mostly in Denmark but also in France and the United Kingdom. They settled in Karkur and earned a living from agriculture, construction and labor in the Port of Haifa. The Kibbutz Artzi network of the Hashomer Hatzair movement decided to merge the groups in April 1939 and the two were symbolically united on 1 May (International Workers' Day). That same day 50 pioneers, 25 from each group, arrived at the site next to the Arab village of Daliat-El-Ruha (depopulated in 1948) and began farming the land which was owned by the Jewish National Fund (KKL). The first kibbutz industry was a small soap factory. Between 1940 and 1943 a stable, cowshed (used until 1970), cheese factory, textile factory, chicken coop (used until 1973) and beehive were built. A road was paved from the nearby kibbutz of Ein HaShofet, connecting it to the rest of the country's road system. The first permanent residential structure was built to house the kibbutz babies..

In 1944 youth from the kibbutz organized a group, which later joined the Palmach militia. One of their members died in the "Night of the Bridges", an operation by the Jewish militias against bridges on the borders of Mandatory Palestine. They fought with the Yiftah Brigade during the 1948 Arab–Israeli War and some of them established Kibbutz Harel. In 1947 the kibbutz housed a nationwide squad leader course for the Palmach. During the war, an Egyptian plane was downed near the kibbutz and the pilot was held in the kibbutz cowshed.. The kibbutz donated its only truck to assist the war effort and coopted its industrial facilities.

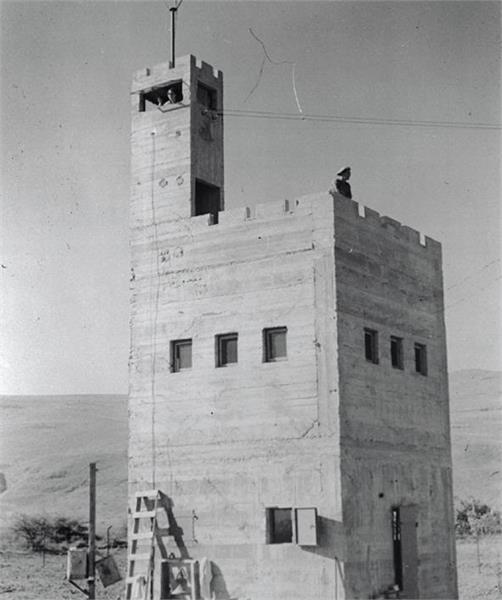
Dalia 1940

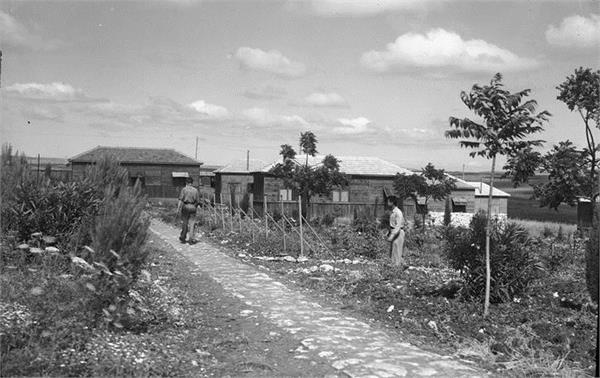
Dalia 1943

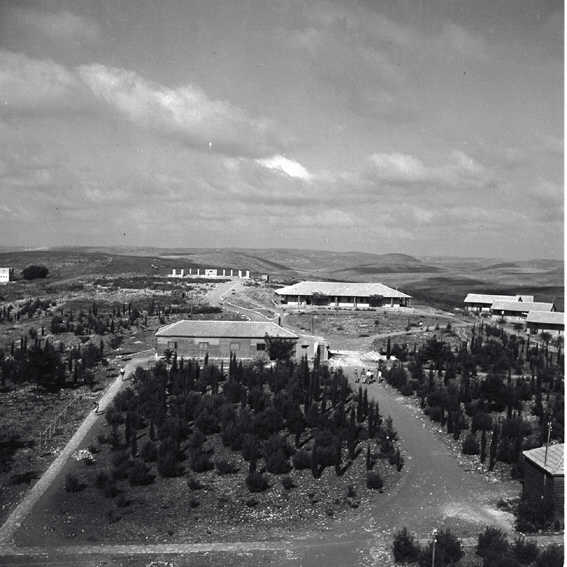
Dalia 1944

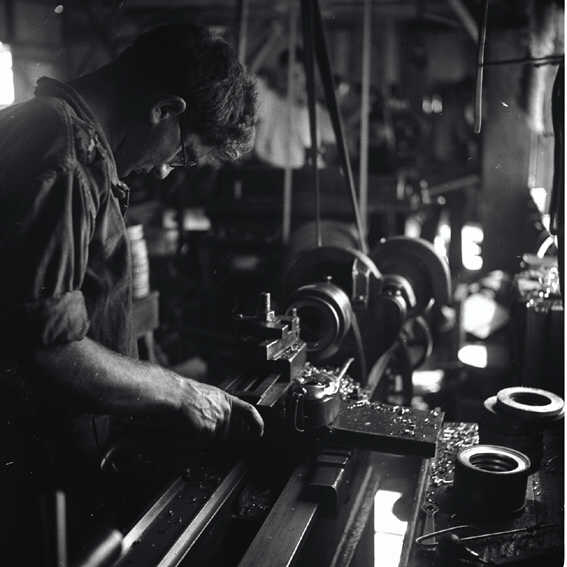
Dalia workshop 1944

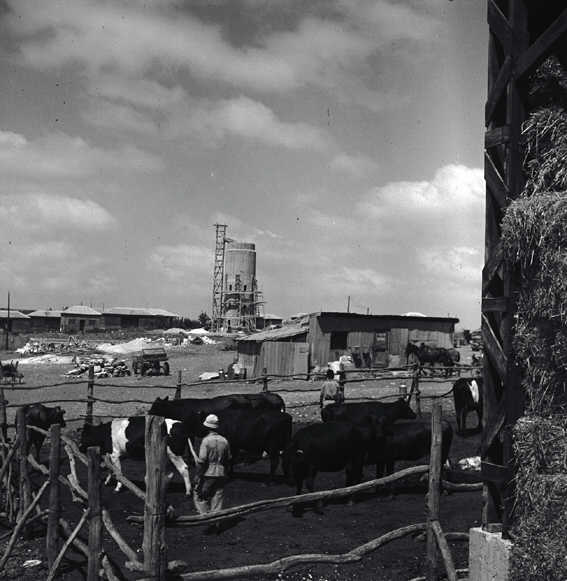
Dalia dairy 1944

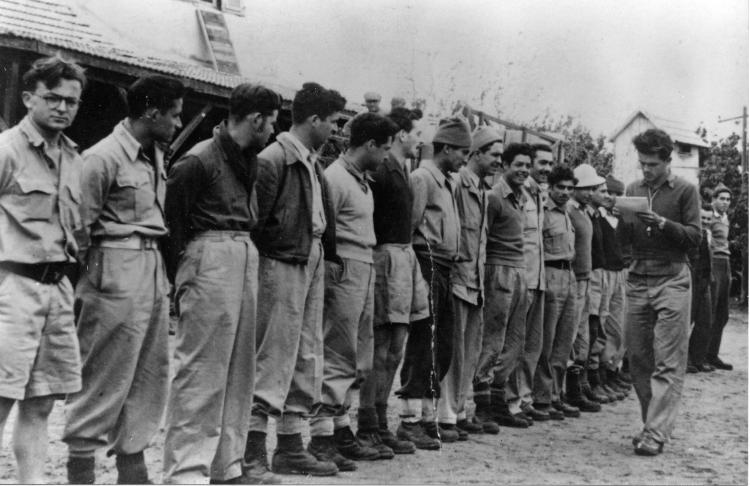
Yiftach Brigade 1st Battalion, "D" Company, roll-call, Dalia. 1948

=== Culture ===
Cultural and communal activities flourished in the kibbutz. A folk-dancing festival organized by Gurit Kadman in 1944 was held at the "Khan" on the kibbutz during the festival of Shavuot. The Book of Ruth (Megilat Ruth) was the theme of the festival, and residents of the various settlements in this region took part. Among the participants was Yemeni Jewish Sara Levi-Tanai, who founded the Inbal Dance Theater company in 1949. The festival lasted for two days, with 200 dancers and 3,000 viewers. Three years later, in 1947, a second dance festival was held in the natural amphitheater beside the kibbutz. At this festival, several hundred dancers participated, watched by some ten thousand people from all over the country. Kibbutz theatre director Shulamit Bat-Dori directed the last two dance festivals held at Kibbutz Dalia, in 1958 and 1968. The 1958 production spotlighted 1,500 dancers, while the 1968 festival featured 3,000 dancers and attracted 60,000 audience members.

== See also ==
- Dance in Israel
- footage of folk dance festival 1940s at Kibbutz Dalia from Fred Monosson archive
