= Camp Kimama =

- Formation: 2004
- Founder: Ronen Hoffman
- Type: Jewish summer camp
- Headquarters: Israel, New York
- Location: Israel, Italy, Austria, Spain, United States
- Official language: Hebrew - English
- CEO: Avishay Nachon
- Board of directors: Avishay Nachon, Deddy Paz, Evan Muney
- Key people: Alon Parnas (Deputy CEO), Efrat Ramati (VP Israel & Europe), Arnon Rabin (VP North America)
- Website: www.eng.campkimama.org/home

Camp Kimama (Hebrew: מחנה קימאמה) is an international network of summer camps, with camps in Israel, the United States, Spain, and Italy, and offices in Israel and New York.

== History ==
Camp Kimama was founded in Israel in 2004 by Ronen Hoffman with the intention of bringing American-style Jewish summer camps to Israel. At the time, most Israeli summer camps ran for two or three days and were run by youth movements such as Noam on land belonging to JNF/KKL. The camp became the first international summer camp in Israel, bringing participants aged 6–17, from 40 different countries to Israel. The first summer, 140 campers attended (60 international) and in 2021 there were over 6,500 campers (2,000 were international). All of the Kimama camps in Israel are run under the supervision of the Ministry of Education.

The first Kimama camp was established in 2004 in Michmoret, a coastal moshav in central Israel within the seaside youth village Mevo’ot Yam. Kimama now operates three camps in Israel, in addition to camps in the United States and Europe. The camp's name, Kimama, comes from the word for “butterfly” in the Shoshone Native American dialect. For Kimama, the butterfly symbolizes freedom, creation, and development. Avishay Nachon, the CEO of Kimama, stated that, like the impacts of development, “the flapping of a butterfly’s wings on one side of the world makes ripples on the other side.” Specifically, it represents process-based experience, an experience of development from one stage to another in life.

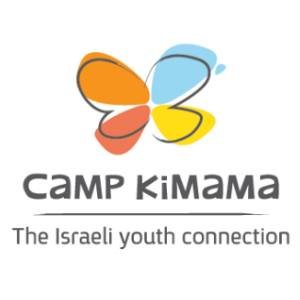
Camp Kimama's second logo, from 2012, which highlighted its connection to Israel

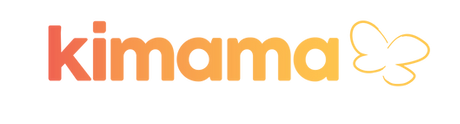
Kimama's current logo, which it began using in 2022

== Educational approach ==
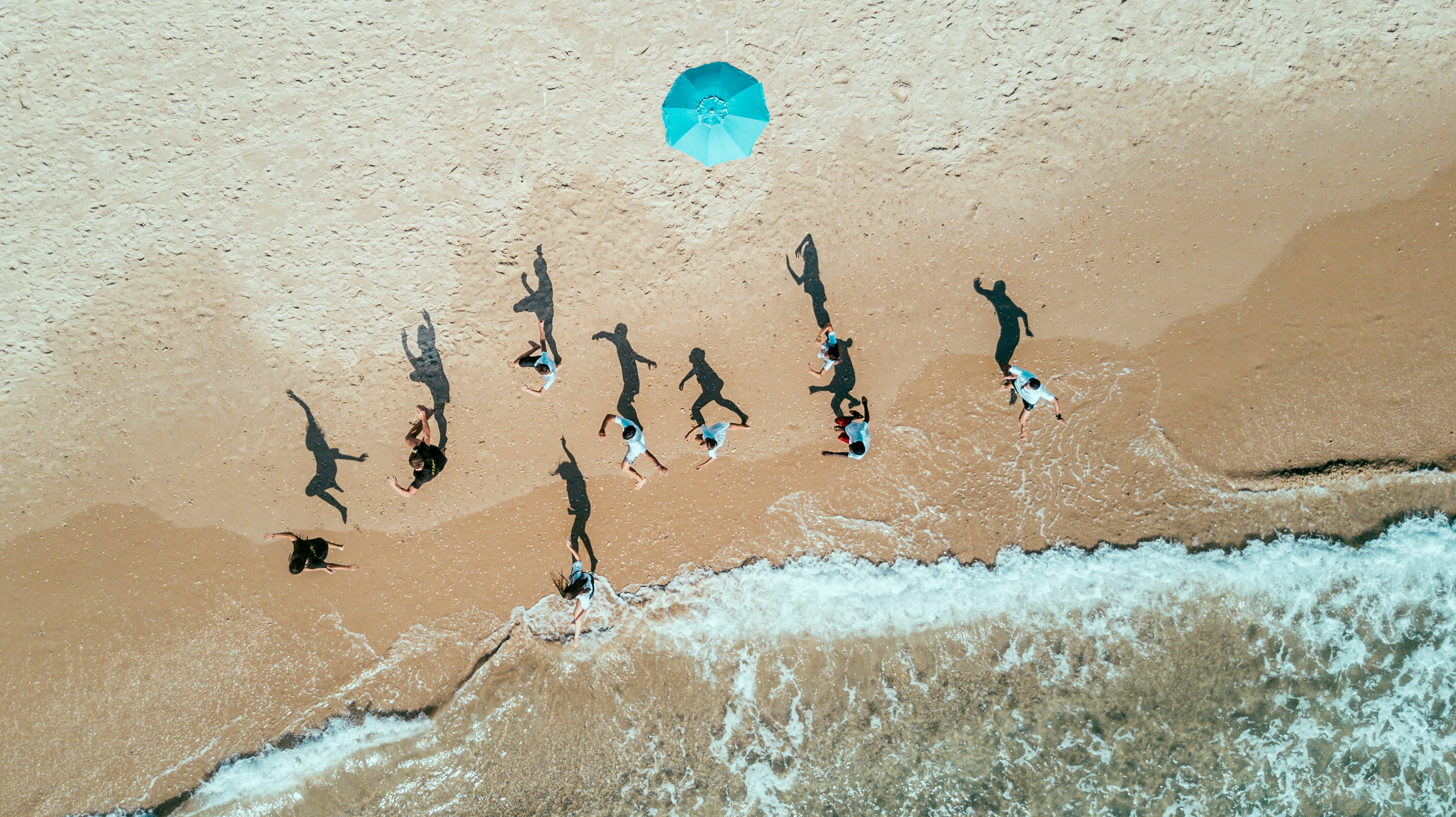
Campers at Kimama Galim

Kimama's educational approach focuses on integrating recreational activities with important skills and values. In particular, the system is based on five key values:

1) “The Freedom to Be Me:” An environment of freedom for campers where they can express their own individuality and personality without being subject to criticism or judgment.

2) “International Israeli-Jewish Encounter:” Connecting Jewish and Israeli students from around the world, as well as improving communication skills in a variety of languages.

3) “Personal Quest – Transitions:” Focusing on encouraging independence and self-confidence is a core component of Kimama's approach.

4) “Values and Belonging:” Connecting Jewish youth from around the world to Israel and to each other, as well as focusing on the long-term experience of summer camp.

5) “Spirit of Adventure:” Through a focus on outdoor and “meaningful activities,” the camp encourages campers to explore and push their boundaries. The location of Kimama's camps along Israel's coast allows for sea-based activities such as sailing, surfing, and windsurfing, and gives campers access to the Mediterranean Sea, one of Israel's primary sources of tourism.

== Camps in Israel ==
=== Kimama Michmoret ===
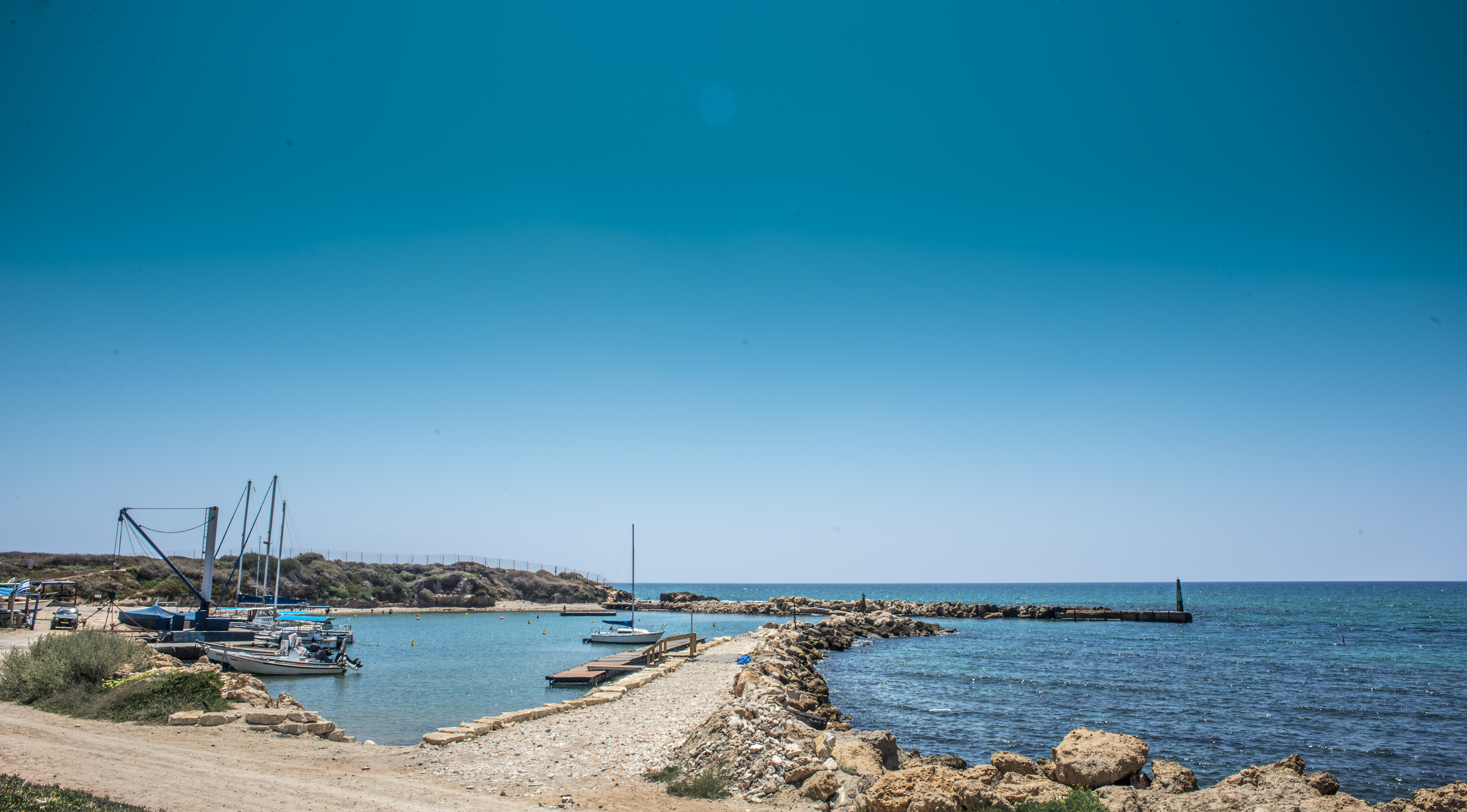
Kimama Michmoret in Mevo'ot Yam

Kimama Michmoret, the original camp, was established in 2004 in Michmoret, a coastal moshav in central Israel, within the seaside youth village of Mevo’ot Yam.

=== Kimama Galil ===
Kimama Galil opened in 2006 at Kibbutz Amir, within the Eynot Yarden school in the upper Galilee. It operated for 7 years until it closed in 2013.

=== Kimama Galim ===
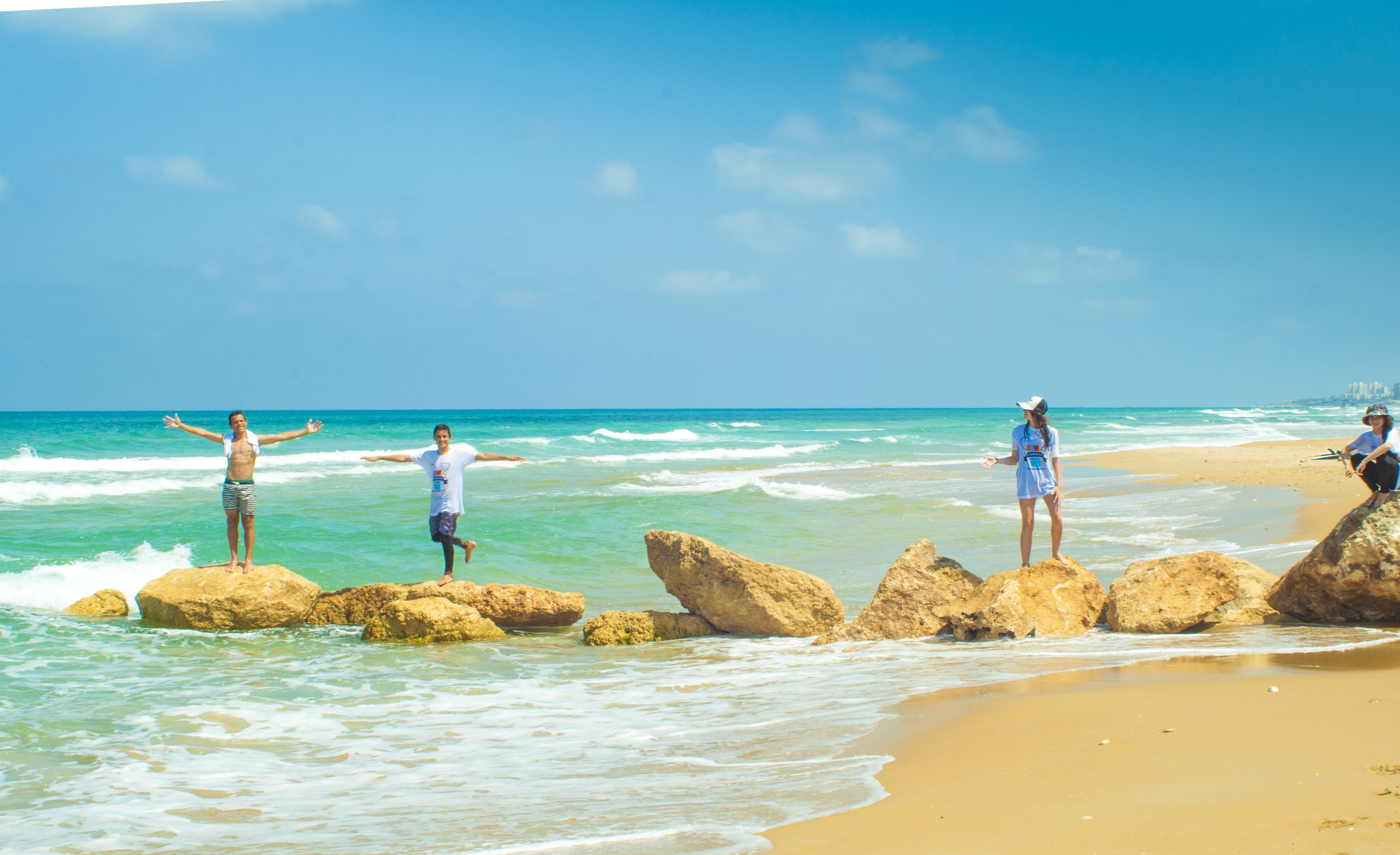
Campers at Kimama Galim

Kimama Galim opened in 2013 as Kimama Carmel near Haifa in the Kfar Galim Youth Village. In 2016, it changed its name to Kimama Galim after the youth village where it resides. Kimama Galim now operates an overnight camp and a day camp.

=== Kimama Hof ===
Kimama Hof was established in 2014 in the Hadassah Neurim Youth Village, near the city of Netanya with an emphasis on nature and sea activities.

=== Kimama Tech ===
In 2016, a new camp, Kimama Hub, was added in Galim Youth Village for campers interested in the startup and entrepreneurship fields, as well as technology and media. In 2017, the camp changed its name to Kimama Tech. The camp operated for three summers, closing in 2018.

=== Kimama-Bereisheet ===
Kimama Bereisheet opened in 2019 as a joint project between Kimama and Bereisheet, a New Jersey non-profit that works to build ties between Israel and the American Jewish community.

=== Other Israel Programs ===
During the COVID-19 pandemic, Kimama opened two new programs: Kimama Van, a one-week road trip, and Kimama Race, a weeklong countrywide competition.

In 2021, Kimama started its Ambassador program. Kimama Ambassador combines two Kimama programs — Michmoret and Kimama Van — and is targeted at Jewish teens from North America. The Ambassador program is now funded through a grant from RootOne, which allows children from non-Orthodox schools in the U.S. to experience the program at a reduced cost.

== Camps in Europe ==
In 2007, Kimama began organizing winter camps in Europe and, for the first time, established a ski camp in the village of Natz, in Italy. The goal of this camp was to provide youth from Israel camping opportunities during the Passover and Hanukkah vacations. In 2017, Camp Kimama participated in an experimental farm-based incubator program at H-FARM, near Venice, Italy. Kimama Barcelona opened in 2017, on Campus Cerdanya, a forest resort in the Spanish Pyrenees.

== Camps in the United States ==
In 2011, Kimama established a summer camp in New York, to serve the large community of Israeli-Americans living in the United States. The one-year pilot program was run under the auspices of Kinder Ring summer camp. In all, 120 campers participated in the program, 60 of which came from Israel, and 60 from the United States, mainly from the New York and New Jersey area. A few years later, a second pilot program, Kimama New York, was founded in conjunction with Camp Tel Yehudah. The program brings together Jewish teens from Israel and the United States to

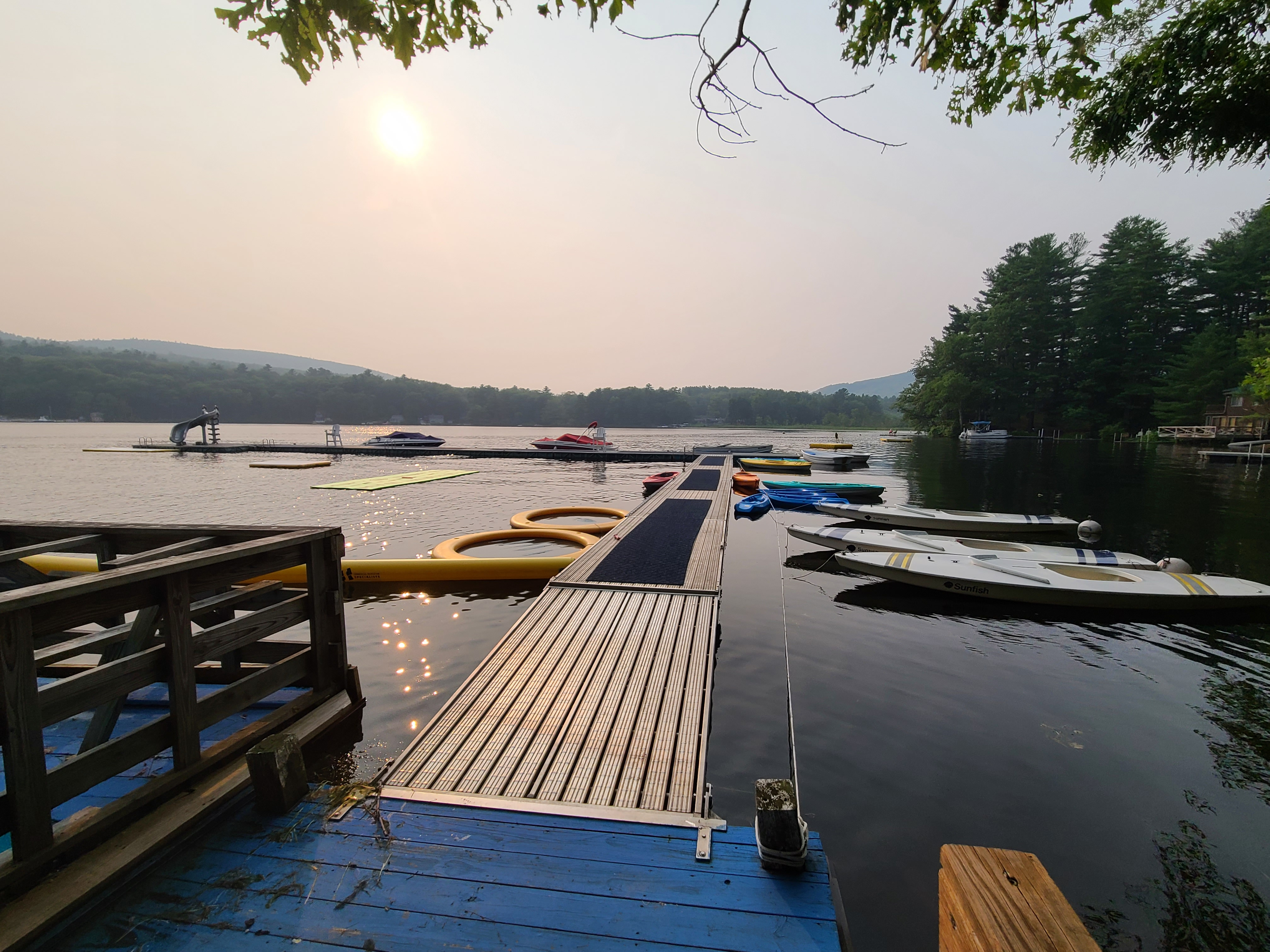
The lake at Kimama Half Moon

participate in a variety of skill-based programs.

Kimama now operates two camps in the New York area: Kimama 14Y Day Camp in Staten Island, and Kimama Bereisheet in Bergen County, New Jersey.

=== Kimama Half Moon ===
In 2022, Kimama purchased Camp Half Moon, a 33-acre sleepaway camp in the Great Barrington region of the Berkshires. Camp Half Moon opened in Monterey, Massachusetts, in 1922. It is named after the Halve Maen, a 17th-century Dutch trading ship that carried timber from the site where the camp is now located. Kimama has said that it plans to preserve the camp's original history, while adding an Israeli touch. When Kimama Half Moon reopens for summer 2022 after an extensive renovation, it will operate a day camp and an overnight camp, both of which are co-ed.

== Community engagement ==
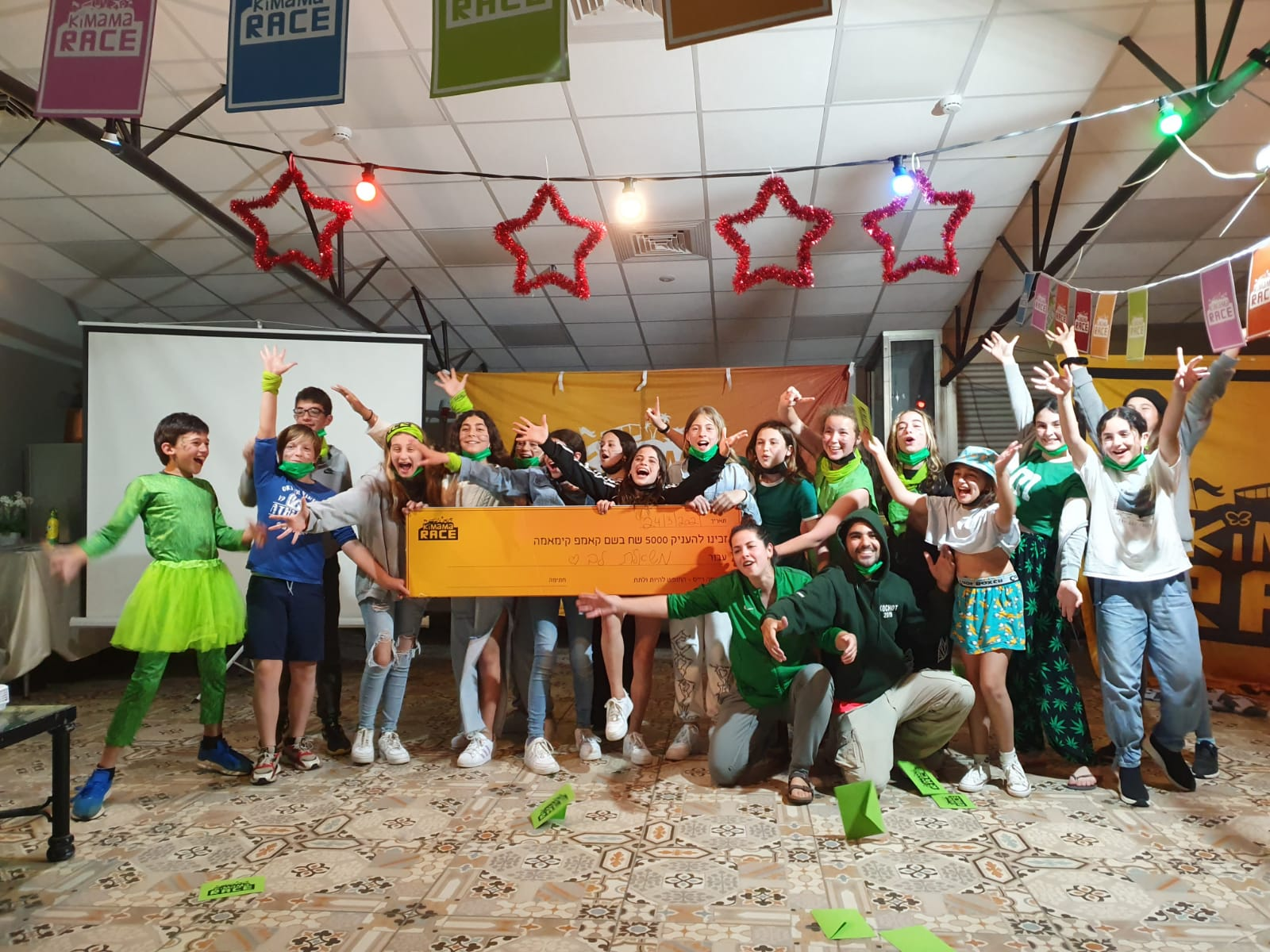
The winning team of Kimama Race with a check made out to the non-profit of their choice

A core component of Kimama's approach is to give back to the communities it operates in. Beginning in 2009, Kimama began Camp Sababa, Israel's first Burn Camp, in cooperation with Schneider Hospital for Children. The camp supports children who are victims of burn injuries and helps them develop confidence and positive self-image. Kimama also participates in fundraisers and supports local programming in the communities in which it operates.

The winner of the Kimama Race program has the opportunity to donate ₪5,000 to a charity of their choice. In past years, Kimama campers have chosen to donate to Shanti House, Make-A-Wish, and ELEM.
