= Summer camp =

Supervised program for children

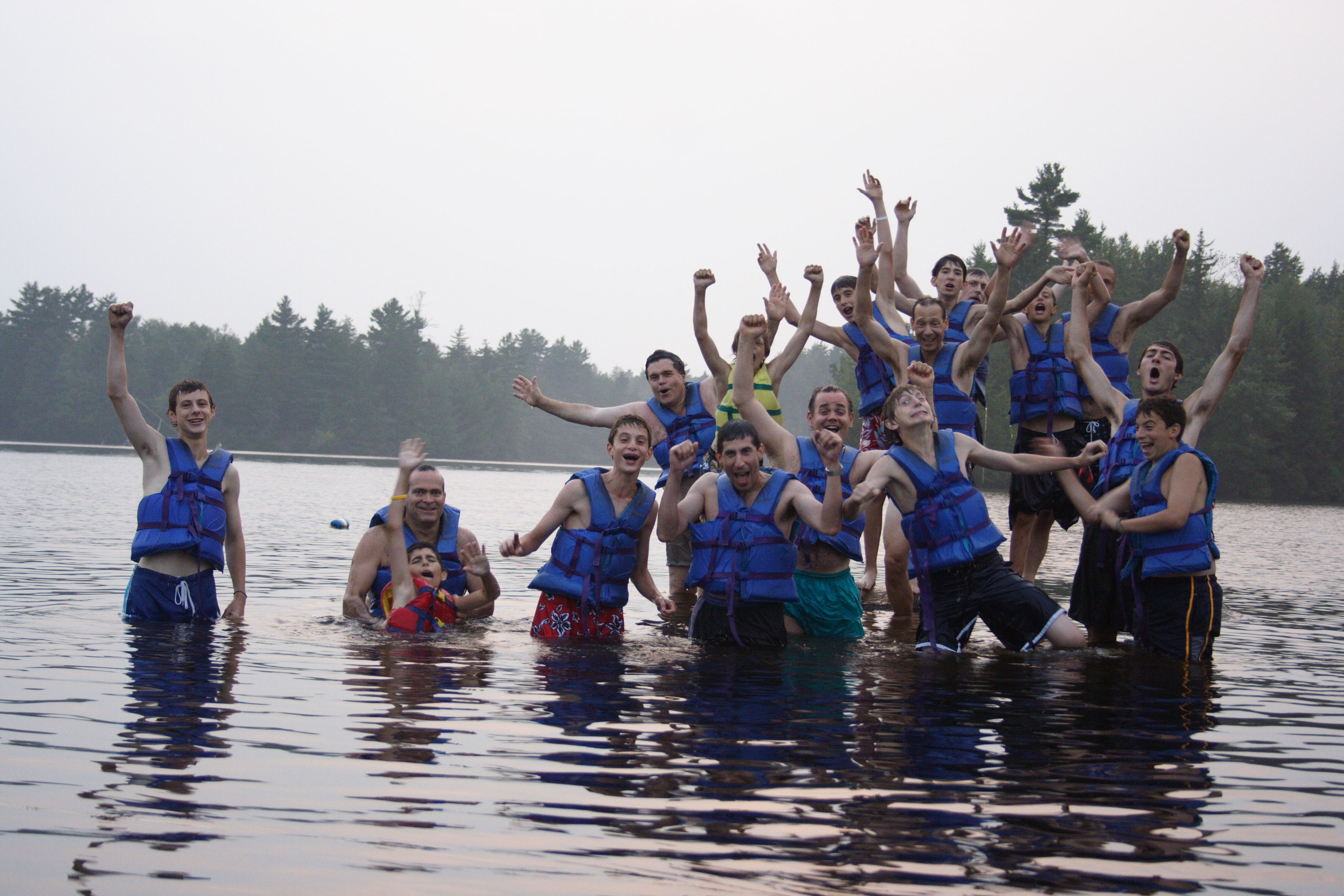
YMCA campers wading in a lake in Massachusetts, 2004. Attendees of summer camps often enjoy outdoor activities.

A summer camp, also known as a sleepaway camp or residential camp, is a supervised overnight program for children conducted during the summer vacation from school in many countries. Children and adolescents who attend summer residential camps are known as campers. They are generally offered overnight accommodations for one or two weeks out in an outdoor natural campsite setting. Day camps, by contrast, offer the same types of experience in the outdoors but children return home each evening. Summer school is a different experience that is usually offered by local schools for their students focused on remedial education to ensure students are prepared for the upcoming academic year or in the case of high school students, to retake failed state comprehensive exams necessary for graduation. Summer residential and day camps may include an academic component but it is not a requirement. They often aim to promote independence, social skills, and outdoor learning through structured group activities.

The traditional view of a summer camp as a wooded place with hiking, canoeing, campfires, etc. has changed with a higher number of camps offering a wider variety of specialized activities. Examples of such themes include the performing arts, music, magic, computer programming, language education, mathematics, children with special needs, and weight loss.

In 2024, the American Camp Association's National Economic Impact Study of the Camp Industry reported 20,175 camps in the United States. This is largely to counter a trend in decreasing enrollment in summer camps, which some argue to have been brought about by smaller family sizes and the growth in supplemental educational programs. Some summer camps are affiliated with religious institutions, including various denominations of Christianity and Judaism.

The primary purpose of many camps is educational, athletic, or cultural development. A summer camp especially for children may allow people to learn new skills in a safe and nurturing environment. Summer camp experience can have a lasting psychological impact on the development of a child.

== History ==
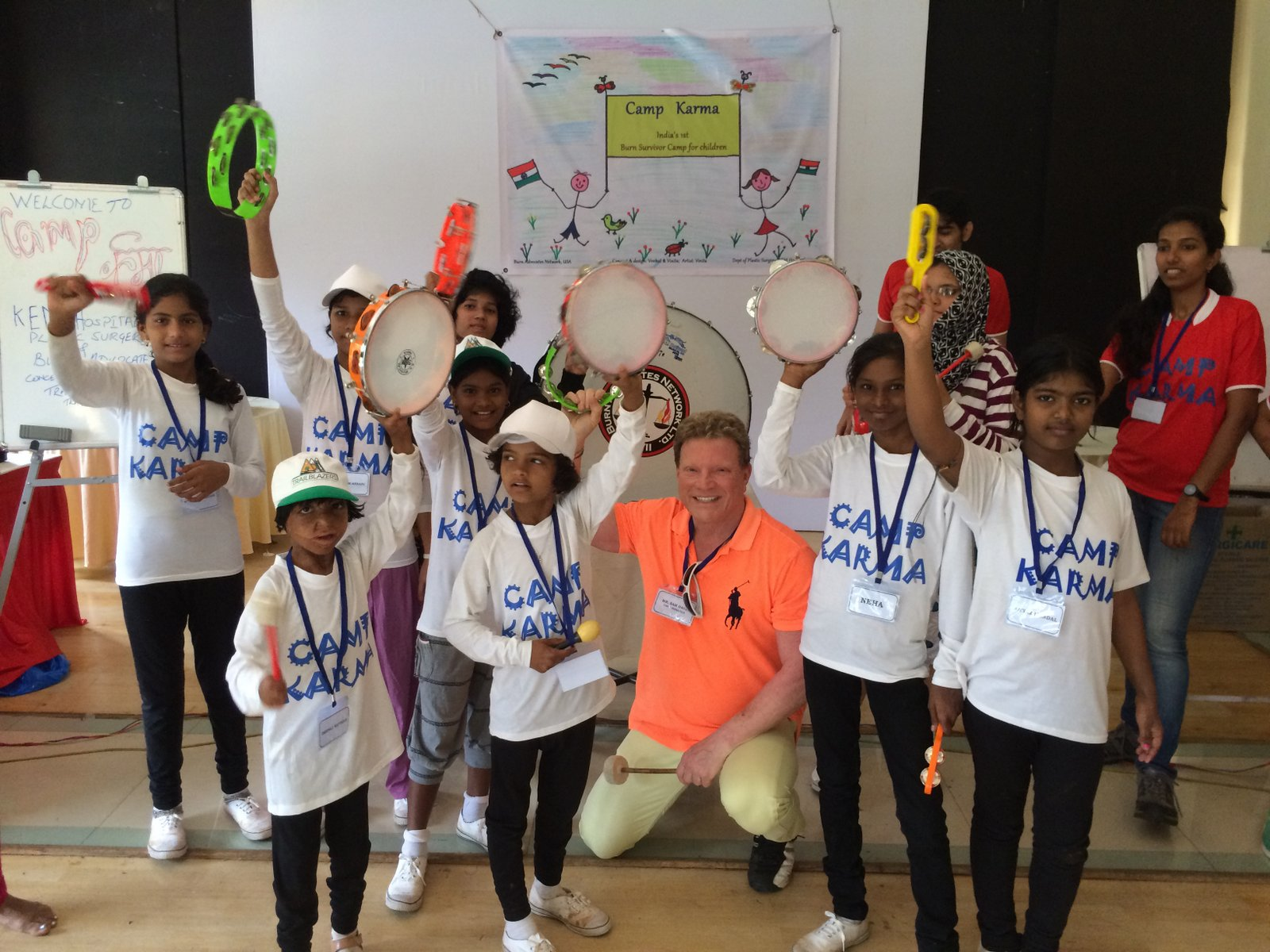
A group of summer camp attendees make music with tambourines, in Maharashtra, India, 2013.

The first organized camp is often credited to the Gunnery Camp, established in 1861 by Frederick W. Gunn in Washington, Connecticut. This camp primarily served as a place for young boys to engage in outdoor activities and develop physical skills. Girls camps in the United States began to appear around 1900; many of the early camps were located in New England. In 1900, there were fewer than 100 camps in the United States, but by 1918 over 1000 were in operation. Early camps for girls were located in remote, natural areas, and many camps featured a water venue. There were outdoor activities such as canoeing, archery, and hiking. Other types of popular instruction involved handcrafts, dramatics, camp and fire-making. Campers slept in wigwams, tents, or open dormitories. Any of these options encouraged a camper to take responsibility for maintaining her own personal space and to develop self-sufficiency.

Mimicking Native American traditions such as council fires and storytelling generated a sense of community and inspired campers to become conscientious members of a group. Typically, girl campers wore their hair in a version of native style. Uniforms were standard in most camps, but braided hair and headbands were common attire for campers. For camp ceremonies and pageants, girls would dress in special Native inspired dresses, at times even contributing to the handiwork. In this era, camps were considered to be a natural pathway for young girls to develop healthy bodies, self-assurance and a sense of community. Today's girls' camps offer many activities, such as STEM Camps, sailing, and dramatic arts.

== Organization ==
In most camps in Canada and the United States, young adult supervisors are called counselors or "cabin leaders". In many camps, counselors are assigned to small groups of campers, called "bunks", "huts", "cabins", or "units", who participate in activities as a group, such as campfires, hiking, canoeing, swimming, nature lore, and arts and crafts. Counselors often share living accommodations with their group.

In the United States and Canada, counselors for residential camps are typically in their late teens and early twenties because of the temporary, seasonal and low-paying aspects of the work. International staff are often hired alongside their North American counterparts through agencies who vet the staff beforehand. Overall camp supervision is typically done by older camp directors, who lead a team that includes cooks, sports instructors, a nurse, maintenance personnel and counselors. The director and the maintenance personnel have a longer-term affiliation with the summer camp. Professional camp staff organize the preparation of facilities and supplies for the camp season and supervise the maintenance of the camp during the off-season. Camp directors conduct the hiring of seasonal counselors, instructors, and support staff, often during job fairs held on campuses or on online job boards.

At some camps, all campers stay overnight in cabins and eat all their meals in a cafeteria. At some camps, also known as day camps, the campers go home each night. Some other camps allow both day and overnight campers. In the US and Canada, residential camps that have overnight facilities are sometimes called "sleepaway camps". Summer camp is often the first time that children spend an extended period of time away from home. Many camps cancelled their 2020 season in light of the COVID-19 pandemic.

== Educational camps ==
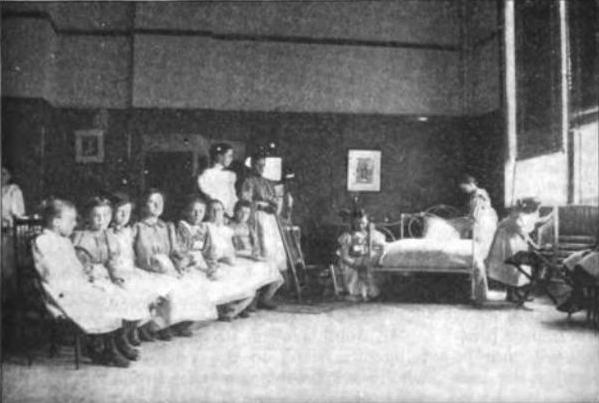
Young girls learning how to make a bed at a "vacation school" in the late 1890s, what in modern terminology would probably be a summer camp.

In the United States, there are numerous models of camp with an educational focus that cater to students of differing ages and academic interest.

=== College credit courses ===
Some camps offer students the opportunity to explore a pre-college experience. Typically, students entering grades 10 through 12 stay in the college dormitories and attend summer classes run by college faculty. At the successful completion of a summer program, course credits are awarded, which in turn are accepted by most tertiary institutions. Typically, colleges in the United States and Canada offer these programs, as it serves as an introduction to students to entice them to attend the college as full-time students based upon a memorable summer experience.

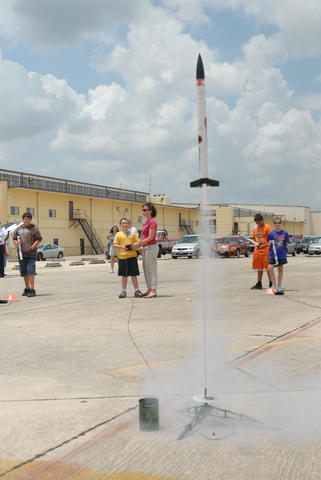
A camper launches a model rocket at Starbase Kelly at Lackland Air Force Base, Texas, Aug. 10, 2007. Starbase Kelly, sponsored by the 433rd Airlift Wing of the U.S. Air Force, is a five-day camp focused on providing fourth, fifth and sixth-graders with education on math, science and technology during the summer.

=== Non-college credit courses ===
Some camps, such as CTY and Duke TIP, are focused primarily on education or on educational-related activities, such as debate, history, or journalism. These camps are often run by colleges or universities, and are usually for children in junior or senior high school. Instruction in debate and speech is also available for middle school students and incoming high school students all over the country. Educational summer camps are different from summer schools as the summer camps often are not offered for school credit, and often have a significant focus on non-academic activities. Many of these camps, such as Canada/USA Mathcamp and SSP, focus on a specific subject, such as mathematics or astronomy. These camps tend to have selective application processes involving problem solving or an essay about the applicant's interest in the subject.

=== Academic adventure camps ===
These provide high school students with the opportunity to study academic topics on a summer adventure travel program, typically in the wilderness or a foreign country. Many include community service as a component of the course. Others also offer college credit with the successful completion of the program.

=== SAT preparation courses ===
Various camp programs offer preparation for the SAT Reasoning Test as part of a mixture of academic learning with summer fun. Often the SAT preparation is offered as a full morning immersion while the afternoons and evenings are geared towards homework and recreational activities. These camp programs often outsource their SAT component from test preparation companies like The Princeton Review or Kaplan who provide the teachers and resources.

=== Enrichment courses ===
These programs offer a wide range of classes that may have little or no scholastic overlap but are taught with the purpose of broadening the student's conception and interest in many otherwise unknown areas of study. Students typically explore subjects like photography, community service, drama, magic, scuba diving, video production, comic book design, crime scene forensics, cooking, yoga, and similar areas.

=== Science and nature ===
Summer camps provide opportunities for children to learn hands-on. One of the oldest and longest-running science camps is the International Astronomical Youth Camp (IAYC) which began in 1969. So far, IAYCs have been held in 15 countries and have hosted 3,468 participants (~1,700 unique), from 81 nationalities worldwide.

=== Tech camps ===
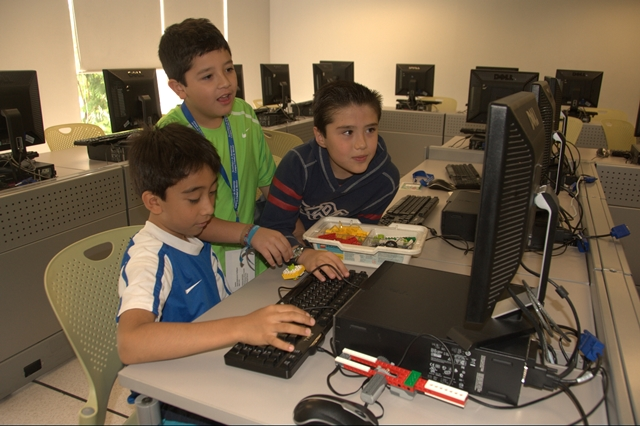
Participants at a robotics camp for children at Monterrey Institute of Technology and Higher Education, Mexico City.

Tech camps focus on technology education. These summer camps develop 21st-century skills in areas such as game design, 3D game creation, web design, graphic design, robot building, and programming languages. These summer camps are typically held on college campuses. Many universities now offer technology-focused camps in the summer as a way of reaching future students, generating revenue and providing community service outreach.

=== Language and foreign culture camps ===
To meet a growing demand for language education, language camps have developed around the United States. Many of these summer programs are hosted by high schools. Colleges and universities have also created camps using their facilities to host for younger students. Foreign countries have established summer schools in the United States to offer education regarding their culture and language. The growing popularity of summer language camps may be related to a growing interest in languages not typically offered in United States high school curricula. Arabic, Mandarin Chinese, and Korean are examples of languages in-demand that do not often appear in a curriculum.

== Other types of camps ==
=== Art and performing arts camps ===
Other camps have become summer training grounds for a variety of arts. Many offer elective classes in a range of creative and performing arts activities including visual arts, music, theater, speech, debate, dance, circus arts, rock and roll, magic and other specialties. Some of these programs have a narrow focus on one particular area, while others offer a wide range of programs. Due to the popularity of these activities, many traditional camps have added some elements of the visual and performing arts into their programs as well.

Oftentimes camps will have various totems or traditions that pass from one group of campers to the next, with each group adding something that denotes their time at the camp, often like a time capsule. Painted totems, wood carving, and show programs often accumulate as a sacred object that passes from one group to the next. Cheer camps have popularized the concept of a spirit stick. Performing art camps often run 3 or 4 week sessions that culminate in some sort of performance that parents and families attend.

=== Sports camps ===
Summer camps can be found that offers intensive instructions in almost any sport imaginable, or that offer quality instruction and competition in a wide range of sports. Camps are split into groups of day camps and overnight camps. In the United States, overnight sports camps fall into two groups. The more traditional of these offer boys and girls the chance to learn and play many sports. Sessions are typically 3 to 8 weeks long, and some camps have multiple sessions. While many strong athletes attend these camps, a traditional sports camp program also serves the needs of less proficient athletes by having all campers compete on teams picked by ability, so all kids get a chance to contribute to their team's success in their daily competitions. Some of these camps have been operating for more than 100 years. These camps generally focus, through the medium of team sports, on the development of the whole child; not just how they are as an athlete, but also how they are as a person, a bunkmate, a teammate, and a friend. Many of these camps include a variety of non-sports programs as well for a more diverse experience.

Many sports camps are of the second type, which focuses almost exclusively on one particular sport. These camps generally focus on helping each camper acquire skills in a sport that helps them gain confidence and improve their chances of making the team when they return to school. Indeed, some campers are helped to be nationally competitive by way of this kind of intensive summer training. These camps generally run week-long sessions, and some campers may attend more than one session even though the curriculum repeats each week. Some single-sport camps offer longer sessions. Many of the instructors at these camps are coaches of local teams, and thus many athletes get valuable extra time with the coach they play for during the school year (or the coach they hope to play for during the upcoming school year). Such camps are also a good way to learn about potential college scholarships in their sport.

Both multi-sport and single-sport camps tend to be run by experienced teachers and coaches (who typically have summers off from their school responsibilities). Cabin staff, instructors, and counselors are typically college athletes. The best sports camps succeed at challenging aspiring athletes both mentally and physically, while also promoting their social and leadership skills. This is possible in part because many of the counselors attended as campers, and thus there is a vibrant "camp culture" that welcomes new campers into an extended camp family and establishes the high standards that incoming campers are encouraged to achieve. The best sports camps do much more than just improve a camper's soccer, tennis, lacrosse, or wrestling skills; they help each child become a more skillful athlete, a more gracious competitor, a more committed team player, and a more confident person.

=== Weight loss camps ===
Weight loss camps are for overweight children, teenagers, and adults to learn about losing weight and keep it off while having a summer camp experience.

=== Emotional education camps ===
These kinds of camps are a new way to increase the emotional intelligence of the children. There are some examples of these camps, around the world, for example, Rumbendëll emotional camp, based in Seville, Spain.

=== LGBT camps ===
LGBT summer camps are safe spaces designed for LGBT youths to experience the supportive atmosphere they may lack at home. They follow a similar model to summer camps, with traditional activities like swimming, canoeing, and bog runs but also queer activities like "Grave Digging", where kids can bury their old gender identities and deadnames, or learning makeup tips from a drag queen. Identity-affirming camps can improve the psychological well-being of LGBT youth.

== Around the world ==
=== Australia ===
Summer camps are largely non-existent in Australia, because the Australian summer break (known as the Christmas holidays) only lasts six weeks, and occurs over Christmas and the New Year, shorter than in North America. Most children participate in School-camps, Girl Guide/scout camps, or school holiday camps with some religious groups (such as the Salvation Army and Seventh-Day Adventists) holding week-long Summer Camps. Girl Guides and Scouts offer 'jamborees' which are camps over 1 to 2 weeks. Multiple-week camps are next to unheard of.

Many of Australia's youth music organizations hold annual rehearsal camps in summer including the Australian Youth Orchestra's National Music Camp and Gondwana Choirs Gondwana National Choral School. Other than the Seventh-Day Adventist Summer Camps, most holiday camps are referred to as "Adventure Camps", because they largely do not occur over summer. Many groups hold holiday day-camps for Primary aged children, and often run week-long adventure camps during the Spring, Autumn and Winter breaks.

Australian Defence Force Cadets often and almost exclusively (excepting school-based units) run their extended camps and courses over school holiday periods, which provide food and lodging for cadets over the course of the camp. However, these camps or field exercises often last only one or two weeks and thus do not fill up the majority of the school holidays. This allows the cadets (who are aged 12–18 years and therefore mostly attend school) to attend the camps whilst still completing normal schooling.

=== Canada ===
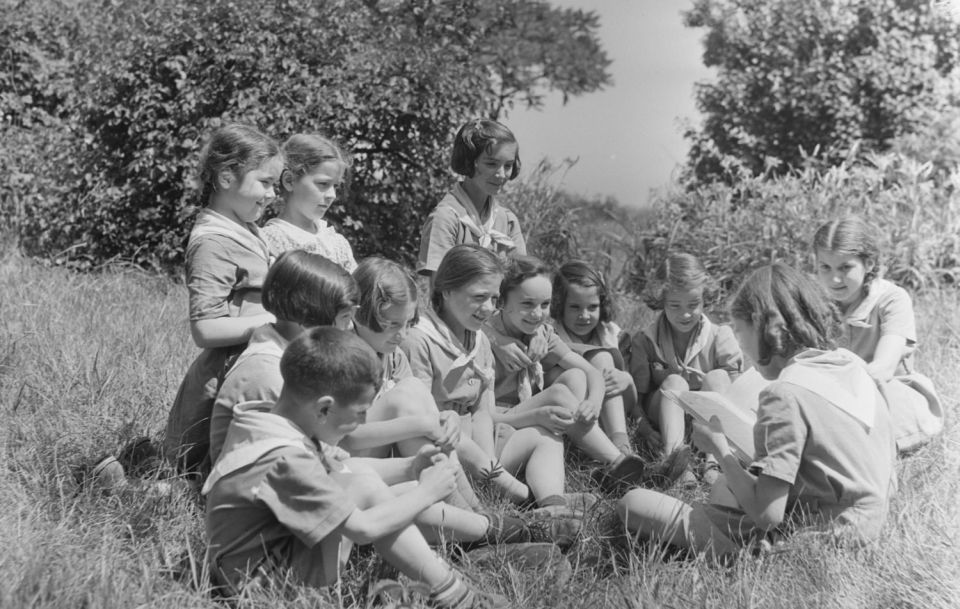
Children in a Montreal summer camp, July 1941

In Canada, summer camps are very popular. About 70% of Canadian camps tend to be affiliated with organizations, while the rest are private. There are also many summer camps for ESL students. Summer camp fairs are held throughout Canada, usually during the winter months. Parents and children can meet camp directors and collect information about summer camps. Admission to these fairs is typically free, and the camps on display vary in their cost from completely subsidized fees to quite expensive.

Some camps are specifically designed to reduce Summer learning loss, particularly in literacy and mathematics. For example, the Council of Ontario Directors of Education (CODE) published the results of their study entitled The Ontario Summer Literacy Learning Project 2010. Then, in 2014 they published a Program Planning Guide to help Boards implement Summer Learning Programs (SLP). After three years of delivering the SLP, they concluded that the programs a) make a difference for students experiencing literacy challenges, b) minimize summer learning losses, and c) in many cases, increase literacy achievements. In recent years the project has included both French and English classes, blended literacy & numeracy, robotics, coding, student mentors, Indigenous activities and English Language Learning, and reports are available online.

=== Chile ===
The Chilean Inglés Abre Puertas (English Opens Doors) program from the Ministry of Education runs each January and July English-language Summer and Winter camps, respectively. The camps take place during the students' vacations, and "are designed to give talented Chilean public high school students the chance to practice English in a more hands-on way through interactive activities including role-playing exercises, field trips, group projects, and competitive games."

=== China ===
Most of the summer camps are sponsored by the educational bureau. However, nowadays, there are more privately held camp programs. The traditional camps are only open to the selected students within individual school districts. In recent years, programs have started that are open to kids from different backgrounds and regions. There are also programs tailored for international students who are interested in learning Chinese language and culture.

=== Cyprus ===
In Cyprus, summer camps are widely used for children. They usually are situated in the Troodos Mountains area and more specific around Platres. The church, government and organised groups provide funds for many children so that they can join summer camps for free.

=== Czech Republic ===
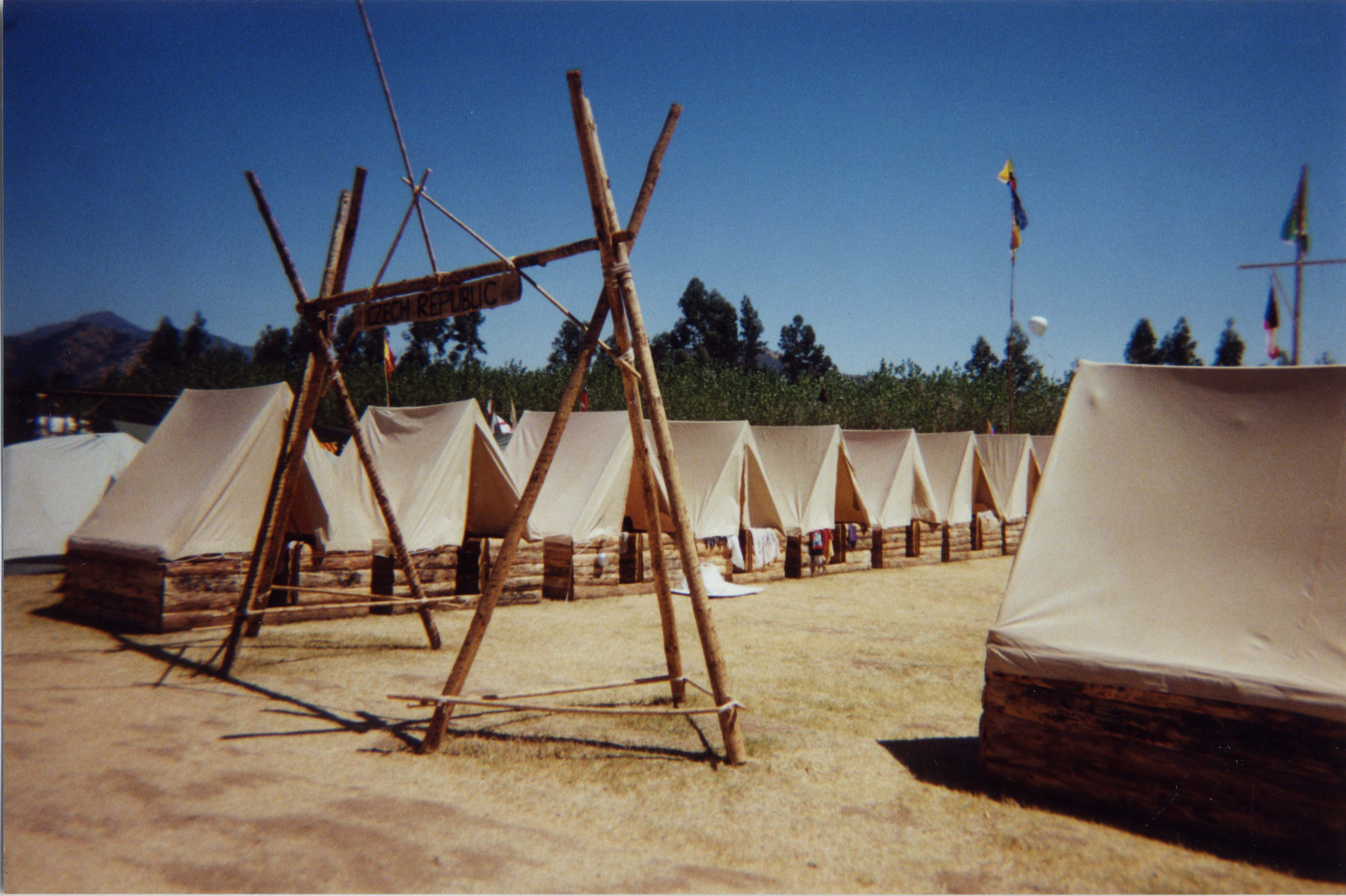
Czech camp made of typical "podsadové stany"

There is a long-standing tradition of summer camps in the Czech Republic. Most commonly, campers are accommodated in tents standing on so-called "podsada". It was invented in 1913 and nowadays it is widely used across the Czech Republic, but also in some other European states such as Slovakia. These camps are usually situated in meadows surrounded by forests far away from cities and civilisation in general. Even though there is almost no possibility to use electrical devices and no facilities such as hot water, the popularity of those camps is still increasing.

=== Finland ===
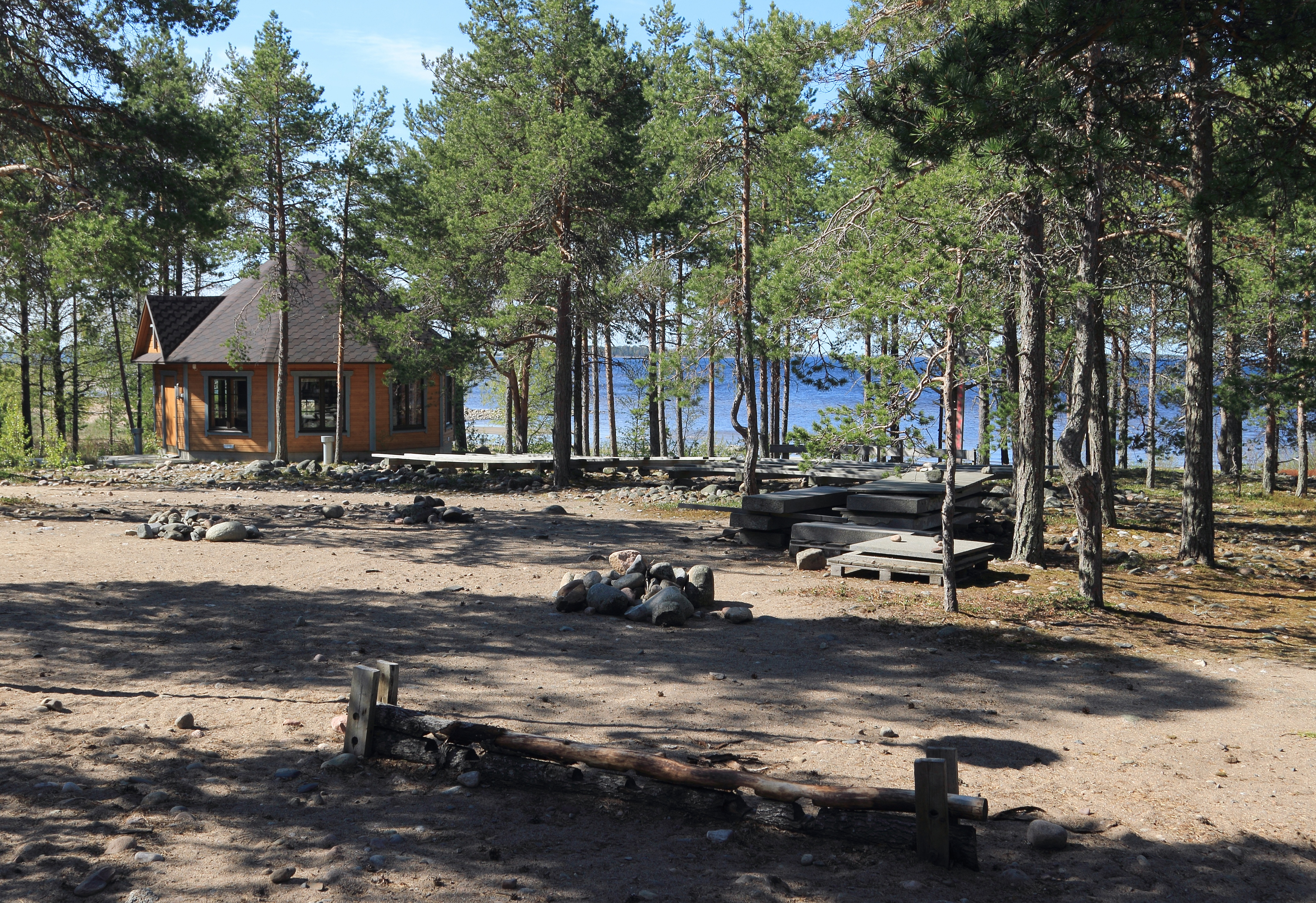
The Isoniemi Summer Camp in Kello, Oulu, Finland

Many Finnish non-governmental organizations arrange summer camps for children in a wide variety of age brackets. Major organizers of summer camps are the scouts, sports teams and the orthodox and evangelic-Lutheran churches. The concept of summer camps arose with the rapid post-WWII urbanization and industrialization Finland experienced. The reason behind this was that Finnish pedagogues of that period, influenced by the values of the largely agrarian pre-WWII society, were convinced that an urban lifestyle was harmful to the development of children. The idea behind summer camps was to ensure that children had experiences of the countryside, experiences that would aid in development into a decent citizen.

One Finnish tradition also arose soon after WWII, was confirmation camps. Confirmation camps, religious camps for 13–16 years old youths organized by the local churches, aimed to combine the traditional concept of confirmation school and the newer concept of summer camps in order to battle secularization of the society. The concept was successful enough to such an extent that today, 90% of all youths participate in confirmation camps. The camps require their participants to learn certain religious texts, such as the catechism, and the Lord's Prayer. There are a number of non-religious alternatives for confirmation camps, such as the Prometheus Camp, which aim to generate a positive intellectual and social atmosphere for the participants of the camp without religious tuition.

=== France ===
In France, they are called colonies de vacances or more recently centres de vacances. According to the French administration, more than 25% of French children attend this kind of "collective holiday" each year.

=== Greece ===
In Greece, summer camps are widely known for offering organized vacations for children. They offer sports activities, entertainment activities, and educational activities. Children 5 – 15 years old can join summer camps and have the opportunity to interact with peers. The Greek government provides funds for many children so that they can join a summer camp, free.

=== India ===
Summer camps in India are primarily located in the Himalayas in Northern India in the state of Uttarakhand in places like Uroli near Ranikhet, near the Tons river in Purola, near the Ganges in Rishikesh, in Uttarkashi where many peaks like Darba top are located, and in the Shimla region in Himachal Pradesh. In South India, summer camps are popular in Coorg in the state of Karnataka and in Yercaud and Anaikkati in the state of Tamil Nadu. Activities in summer camps in India include rock climbing, backpacking, mountain biking, white water rafting, trekking, ropes, and wilderness craft. Many pre-schools in India such as Season Camps, G MaX, Gurukul Preschool (Hunar Summer Camp ) AppleKids conduct extensive Summer Camps for Kids aged 2 to 12 years. Adventure activities for kids are also popular at the summer camps for age groups of 7 to 18 years. Summer camps focusing on wildlife conservation are getting popular over the years. Many of these summer camps are also held in and around metros like Bangalore, Mumbai, Chennai, Kolkata and Pune.

=== Ireland ===
Summer camps in Ireland were traditionally in the form of Irish colleges in areas that are officially recognized as speaking Irish as the local language, (called Gaeltachts). They are residential Irish language summer courses that give students the opportunity to be totally immersed in the Irish language, usually for periods of three weeks over the summer months. During these courses, students attend classes and participate in a variety of different activities games, music, art and sport. These courses not only provide students with the ability to improve their language skills but also have proved to be a vehicle for introducing traditional cultural activities (céilís, Irish traditional music, etc.) to a new generation.

Whilst Irish colleges are still popular, a greater variety of summer camps are now on offer catering for a range of interests. Sports camps covering Gaelic games as well as rugby and soccer have proven very popular. Arts and crafts, cookery, acting, dance, and outdoor pursuits are some of the other niche camps available. There is also a growing popularity for technical or computer camps. They cover areas such as web design, video production, desktop publishing, etc., reflecting a more modern and diverse Ireland.

=== Israel ===
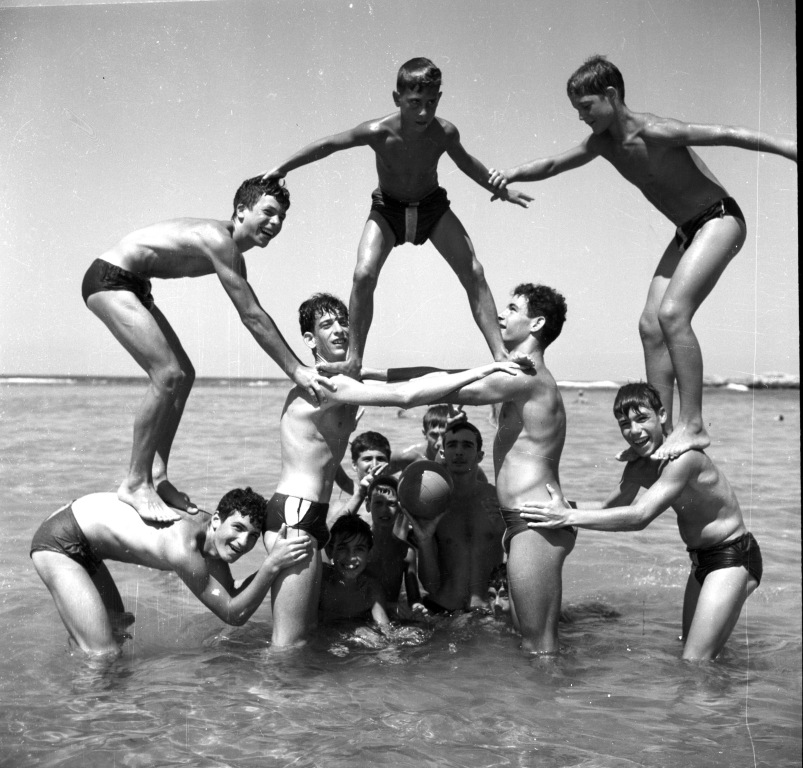
Israeli campers from Kibbutz Yagur in the 1950s

The majority of summer camps in Israel are run by the youth movements and the largest organization is the Israeli Scouts who are organizing over 40 different overnight camps every summer with more than 80,000 participants. Youth movement summer camps usually take place between 3 and 12 days. There are some longer overnight camps where campers stay for two weeks such as Camp Kimama, which was founded in Michmoret, within the youth village of Mevo'ot Yam.

Summer camps in Israel are organized by various youth movements, which can be categorized into secular and religious groups. Religious youth movements, such as Bnei Akiva and Ezra, operate their camps in accordance with Jewish law (Halakha); while participants stay at the campsite over Shabbat, no travel or active programming that violates religious observance takes place. Secular movements also celebrate Shabbat with communal meals and traditional ceremonies, though their activity schedules remain more flexible.

Today, there are summer day camps in almost every village and city, most of which are run by the local authority or certain organizations. In addition, there are a lot of church organized camps including many denominations. For example, all evangelical churches (mostly in the Galilee) hold a Vacation Bible School (VBS) which includes many activities for children. One of the overnight camps is called the Potter's Wheel Camp (PWC) which was originally started by Baptist missionaries at the Baptist Village near Petah Tikva. This camp continues to serve hundreds of children to this day.

A unique aspect of summer camps in Israel is the stringent security protocol. Due to the regional security situation, all organized summer camps are subject to the Summer Camps Law (1990), which requires a business license from local authorities and formal approval from the Ministry of Education. This process involves mandatory coordination with the Ministry of Education's Situation Room and, in many cases, the presence of armed security guards to protect participants from potential terror threats. High-level coordination with local police and security forces is a standard requirement for these programs.

=== Italy ===
In Italy, summer camps take place during the students' vacations (usually between June and August).

=== Malaysia ===
Summer camps in Malaysia are not so popular as in other countries. Children & teenagers have fun together by themselves. But now, summer camps are slowly getting attention. The biggest summer camps available are usually for children below 7 years old.

=== South Korea ===
Summer camps in South Korea are English Immersion camps where the emphasis is on learning through structured lessons, and especially tailored activities to ensure students use the language as much as possible. South Korea is quite unique with its emphasis on acquiring English speaking skills, and teachers for these 2 to 4 week camps come from all over the English speaking world. Some of the teachers are on vacation from their regular work in South Korea. Others come from their home countries or other countries where they might be working and are on special visas just for the camps.

Some employ as many Korean staff as there are native English teachers to ensure the cultural and communication gaps are narrowed. A good camp should provide equipment and well-researched texts for the different levels of students. To maximize the learning time spent there should be no more than 11 students per class. At some of the camps, students sleep at dormitory accommodations, which are monitored all through the night by Korean staff. Other camps are day camps where the majority of students are bused to and from the camp. Teachers spend most of their time with their students. They eat together, play sports together, and supervise them when there are special group activities. Similar camps are also offered during winter vacation. They are certainly no less popular than the summer camps.

=== Russia ===
In the USSR, the first summer camps were created shortly after its establishment and were called Young Pioneer camps during the Soviet Union's existence. Their number grew throughout the history of the Soviet Union and they numbered more than forty thousand in 1973, with 9,300,000 children attending them during their vacation every year. After the breakup of the USSR, the number of Young Pioneer camps greatly declined. However, many of the major camps still exist. There are 2,726 Residential camps (with 2,000,000 children), and more 40,000 Day camps (3,500,000 children) in Russia (2006). Most of them were united by All-Russian Camp Association "Deti Plus" (Children Plus) in 1994.

=== Sweden ===
The Church of Sweden provides confirmation camps, usually combined with outdoor life. Summer camps are often single sport camps.

=== Tunisia ===
Every year during the summer school holiday, the Youth and Science Association organizes Scientific camps in many regions in Tunisia where children and teenagers can learn new skills, develop their potential and have fun.

=== United Kingdom ===
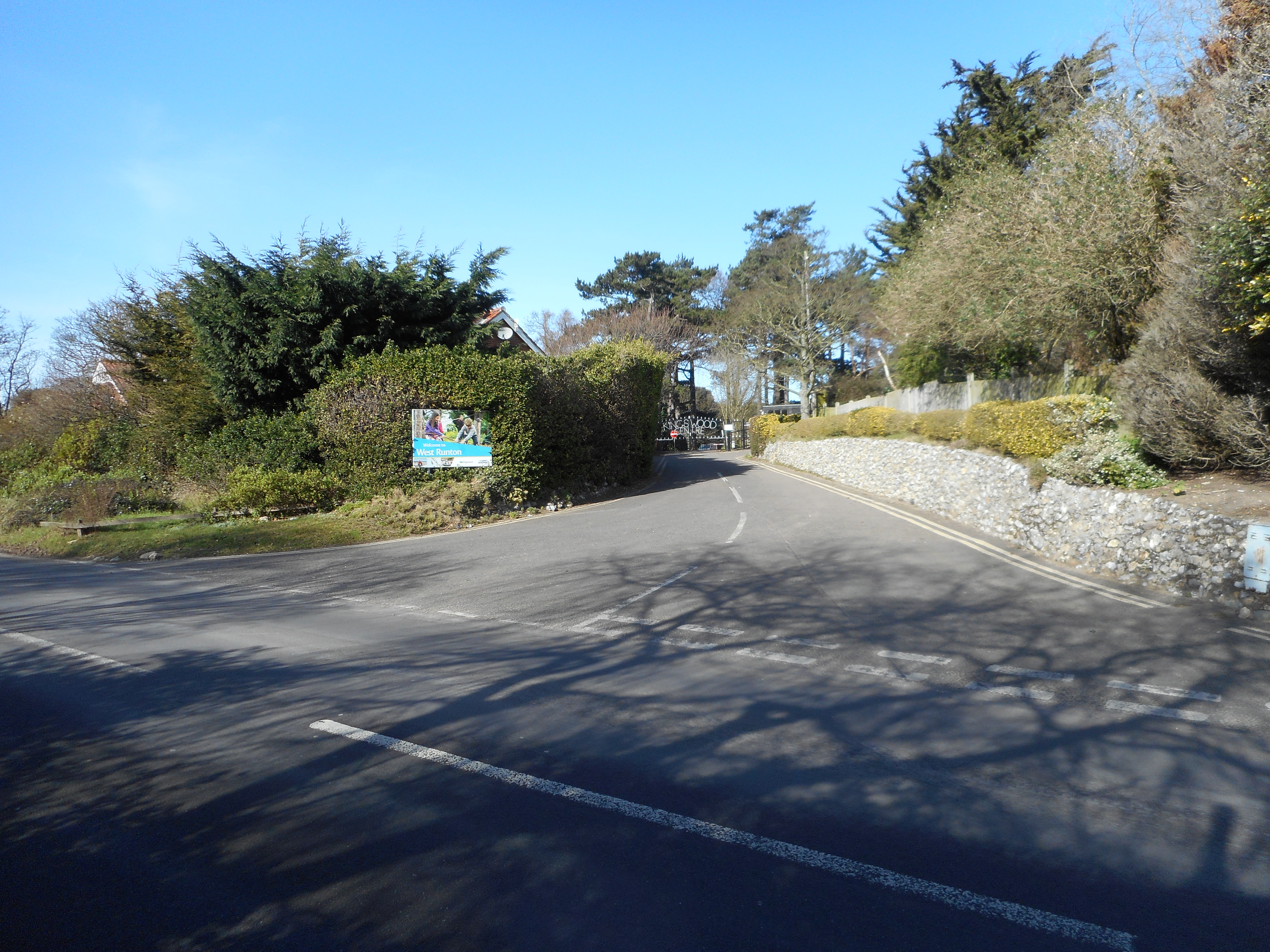
Kingswood, West Runton, a UK summer camp

Summer camps are not a major part of childhood in the United Kingdom in the way they are in North America. The UK school summer holiday is shorter, typically six weeks for state schools. The industry body is called the British Activity Holiday Association. Camps in the UK are also generally less specialised than in the United States and Canada, and most offer a fairly broad multi-activity programme of adventure activities alongside some fun social elements. This is partly because summer camps in the UK grew as an offshoot of the activity holiday industry and were therefore influenced by their adventure-only outdoor program. The UK has for the past few decades had a number of organisations that have established themselves more along the traditional model with a very wide range of holiday options as well as themed camps and major event days.

Some religious organisations also run camps throughout the country. The Titus Trust and its predecessors, has been running evangelical Christian camps for children at private schools since the 1930s. Scripture Union also runs camps in the UK, and has been doing so since the end of the nineteenth-century. West Runton Holidays has been putting on camps in the village of that name since 1919. Some mission activities involve camp-style accommodation, such as United Beach Missions, which seeks to evangelise to holiday-makers on beaches.

A number of youth organisations, such as the Scout Association, Army Cadet Force and Air Training Corps, do often run more specialised summer camps for their membership, though these are not usually open to non-members.

The Council of Colony Holidays for Schoolchildren ran summer camps called "Colonies" from the mid-1960s to the mid-1980s. Colonies were not based on outdoor pursuits or the "action-adventure" model, but were multi-activity holidays designed to appeal to a very wide range of children. This organisation was based on the French model, and was unique in the UK in that the young volunteers who worked directly with the children (known as "Monitors") were prepared for their work in training courses designed and run by the organisation. After Colony Holidays folded in the 1980s, Chris Green, one of their former staff, set up ATE Superweeks to provide similar holidays. He also campaigns for summer camps to become more widely supported and to help transform children's lives.

=== United States ===
Children swimming at an Indiana church camp

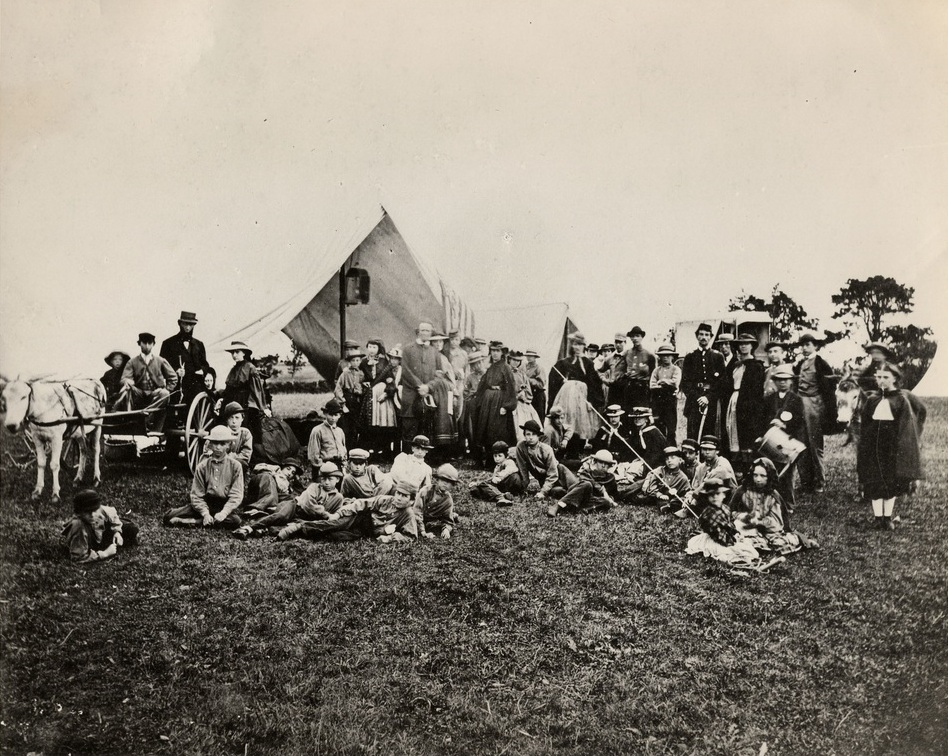
The first American summer camp was the Gunnery Camp in 1861

The American Camp Association (ACA) reported in 2013 that there are about 7,000 overnight camps and about 5,000 day camps in the U.S., for a total of more than 12,000 camps. These camps are attended each year by more than 11 million children and adults. Of the 12,000 camps, about 9,500 are operated by nonprofit groups, and 2,500 by for-profit operators, employing more than 1,500,000 adults. Sports camps abound, offering single and group instruction in numerous sports and activities, often as prep for collegiate sports and scholarships. Their more recent data estimates that, before the COVID-19 pandemic, there were about 15,000 total camps attended by 26 million campers.

In the United States, youth organizations, such as the Boy Scouts, Girl Scouts, 4-H, the JCC, the YMCA, Camp Fire, and several religiously affiliated groups are known for having many camps and integrating them with their own local organizations. Since 2008, the United States has been home to the world's first children's sleep away camp for transgender children. It is called Camp Aranu'tiq and serves campers aged 8 to 18. It won the Eleanor P. Eells Award from the American Camp Association in 2012.

== See also ==
- Campsite
- Tent city
- Summer learning loss
- Vinea Summer Camp
