= Mikhmoret Light =

Lighthouse in Central District, Israel

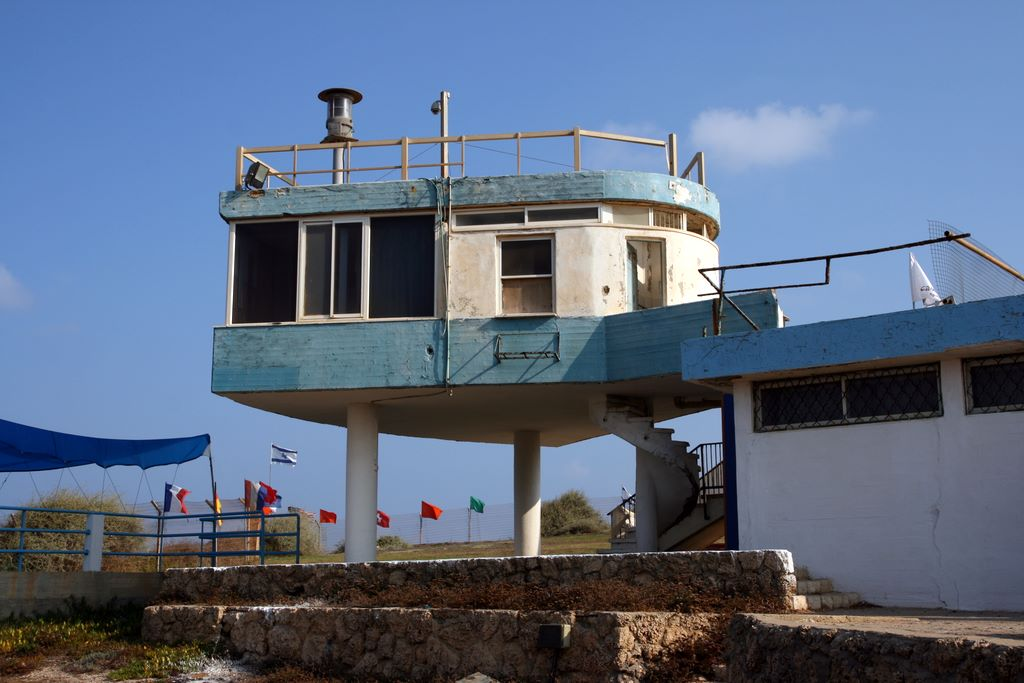
- Mikhmoret Light, 2009
- Location: Mikhmoret, Israel
- Coordinates: 32°24′9.69″N 34°52′2.21″E

Tower
- Constructed: 1960s
- Foundation: one-story concrete building supported by concrete piles
- Height: 14 m (46 ft)
- Markings: dark blue with white trim (building)
- Power source: electricity

Light
- First lit: 1960s?
- Focal height: 14 metres (46 ft)
- Range: 10 nautical miles (19 km; 12 mi)
- Characteristic: two flashes, one white and one red, every 15s

Mikhmoret Light (Hebrew: מגדלור מכמורת), or Mevo'ot Yam Light (Hebrew: מגדלור מבואות ים), is a lighthouse in Mikhmoret, Israel. It is located in the Mevo'ot Yam nautical school, on the north side of the harbor of Mikhmoret.

== See also ==
- List of lighthouses in Israel
