= Jewish summer camp =

Summer camps for the Jewish communities of various cities

A Jewish summer camp is a summer camp dedicated to Jewish communities. In the United States these camps grew in popularity in the years after World War II and the Holocaust as an effort by American Jewish leaders to preserve and produce authentic Jewish culture. Outside the United States, similar camps are generally organized by various philanthropic organizations and local Jewish youth movements.

Jewish summer camps vary in their religious observance and affiliations; some are secular, while others have ties to Reform, Conservative, or Orthodox Jewish organizations. Some camps have ties to Zionist movements or organizations, such as Young Judaea, Betar, Habonim Dror, Hashomer Hatzair and B'nei Akiva.

== History ==
=== United States ===
Jewish summer camps began near the end of the 19th century, when the Jewish population in the United States increased via immigration. It was a way for Jewish children of Eastern European immigrants to assimilate and "Americanize" at a time when summer camps excluded Jews from their ranks, as well as a way to allow children living in the city to experience the countryside. The first Jewish summer camp, Camp Lehman, was founded in 1893 in New York. Another early camp, Surprise Lake Camp, was founded in 1902, aimed towards "lower-income boys from Manhattan’s Lower East Side". Early camps primarily had ties to socialist, Yiddish, or Zionist Jewish organizations.

Most of the early camps also catered primarily to boys; but the Young women's hebrew association was running summer camps by 1925.

After the Second World War the number of Jewish camps in the U.S. expanded as a way to preserve Jewish culture. This period also saw the founding of camps tied to the Reform and Conservative movements. Some camps, such as Camp Hemshekh, were founded specifically for the children of Holocaust survivors.

Many Jewish summer camps began observing Tisha B'Av, a Jewish fast day which had largely "fallen into obscurity among American Jews". Some camps used the day to reinforce the need for the State of Israel, while others used it to focus on past tragedies, such as the Holocaust, or on acts of charity.

The 2010s and 2020s have seen the creation of specialized Jewish summer camp programs, for groups such as adults and LGBT children.

=== Outside the United States ===
Jewish summer camps can also be found in other countries, such as Camp Kimama in Israel. A Jewish summer camp in southern France, MahaNetzer, was founded in the mid-2010s and draws from American and Israeli influences. In Glämsta on the Swedish island of Björkö, a Jewish summer camp has been operating since 1909, initially only for children from impoverished homes. In England, summer camps have been provided from at least 1942 by B'nei Akiva for the orthodox community, and for the more secular by ha-Bonim (now Habonim Dror).

== Demographics ==
=== United States ===
In 2018, 80,000 campers attended Jewish summer camps in the United States. The Foundation for Jewish Camp estimates that the country's 150 non-profit Jewish summer camps are staffed by over 8,500 Jewish college-aged counselors. A 2013 Pew Research study found that a third of American Jews had attended a Jewish summer camp at least once; a 2021 study found that number to be closer to 40%.

A 2011 study by the Foundation for Jewish Camp found that individuals who attended camp were more likely to attend synagogue regularly, donate to Jewish organizations, and have an "emotional attachment" to Israel.

== Foundation for Jewish Camp ==
The Foundation for Jewish Camp (FJC), formerly known as the Foundation for Jewish Camping, is a 501(c)(3) nonprofit serving North America. It serves as an advocate and resource for nonprofit Jewish camp professionals, lay leaders, families and others interested in the field.

In 2008, the Overnight Camp Incentive Program provided grant money to 18 campers to attend Pinemere Camp. The program is a joint project of the Neubauer Family Foundation, the Foundation for Jewish Camp, and the Jewish Federation of Greater Philadelphia. The grants ranged from $750 to $1,250. The majority of the Pinemere campers who received grants chose to return the following summer.

== See also ==
- Jewish country club
- Jewish Community Center
