= Vinea =

Vinea may refer to:

== People ==
- Francesco Vinea (1845-1902), Italian painter
- Ion Vinea (1895–1964), Romanian poet
- Luigi Paoletti Vinea (fl. 1867–1890), Italian painter

== Other uses ==
- Vinea (fictional planet), a setting in the Yoko Tsuno comics
- Vinea (political party), Spanish political party
- Vinea (soft drink), Slovak drink
- Vinea Summer Camp, Dutch summer camp
