= Arab Zahrat al-Dumayri =

Arab Zahrat al-Dumayri عرب ظهرة الضميري Dumeira, al
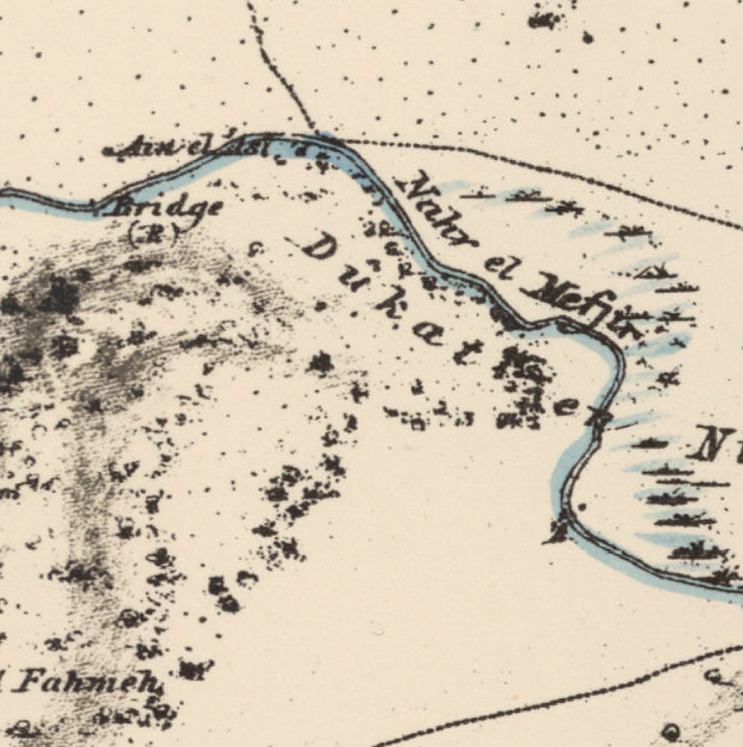
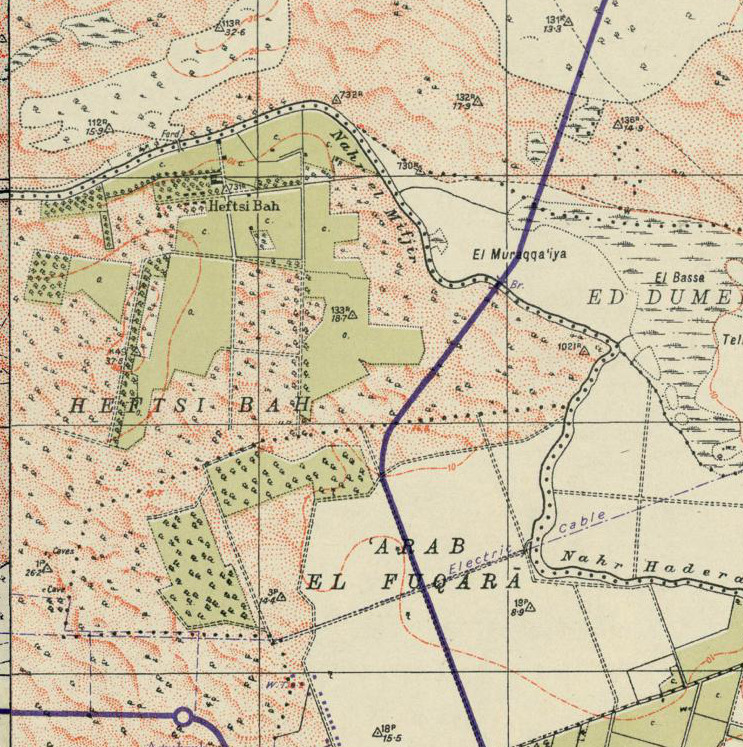
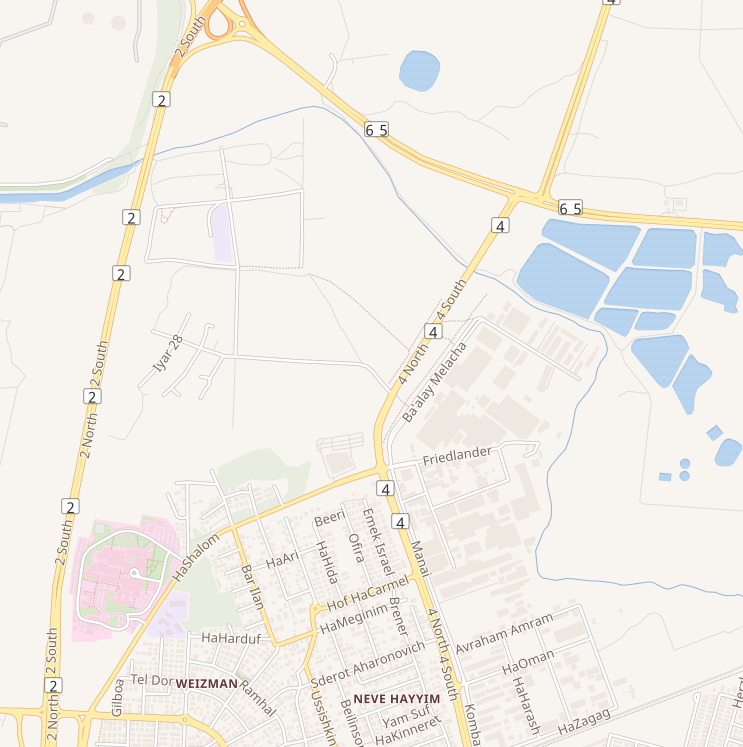
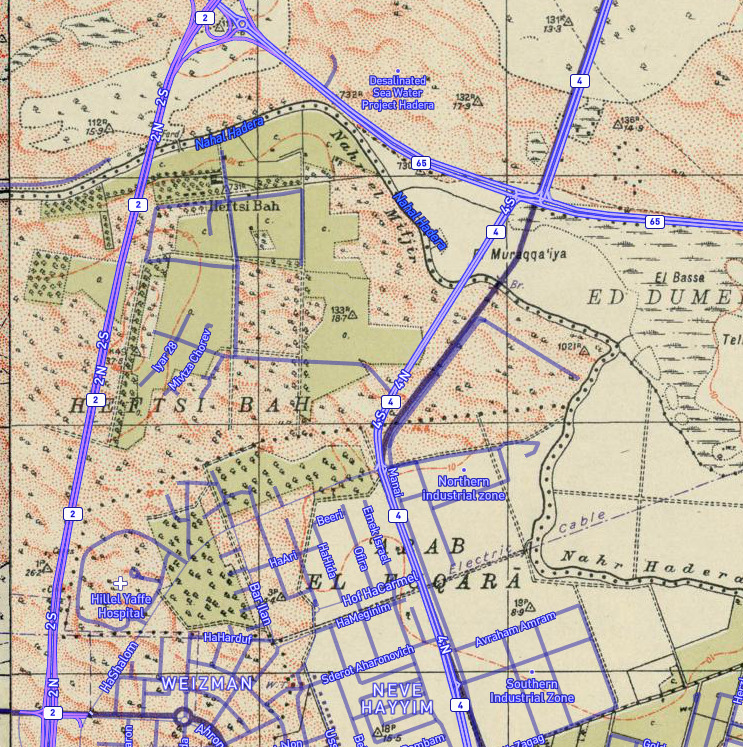
- 1870s map 1940s map modern map 1940s with modern overlay map A series of historical maps of the area around Arab Zahrat al-Dumayri (click the buttons)

- Location within Mandatory Palestine
- Coordinates: 32°27′31″N 34°54′24″E
- Palestine grid: 141/207
- Geopolitical entity: Mandatory Palestine
- Subdistrict: Haifa
- Date of depopulation: 10 April 1948

Population (1945)
  - Total: 620
- Cause(s) of depopulation: Expulsion by Yishuv forces

Arab Zahrat al-Dumayri was a Palestinian Arab village in the Haifa Subdistrict. It was depopulated during the 1947–1948 Civil War in Mandatory Palestine on 10 April 1948. It was located 40 km south of Haifa.

== History ==
In the 1922 census of Palestine, conducted by the British Mandate authorities, Al Damaireh had a population of 227 Muslims.

The population in the 1945 statistics was 620, all Muslims, with a total of 1,387 dunams of land according to an official land and population survey. Of this, Arabs used 263 dunams for cereals, while a total of 512 dunams were non-cultivable land.

On 6 April 1948, the Haganah implemented a new policy for the coastal plains, namely of clearing the whole area of its Arab inhabitants. On 10 April the villagers of Arab Zahrat al-Dumayri, together with the villagers of Arab al-Fuqara and Arab al-Nufay'at, were ordered to leave the area.
