= Arab al-Nufay'at =

Arab al-Nufay'at عرب النفيعات Arab al Nufeiat
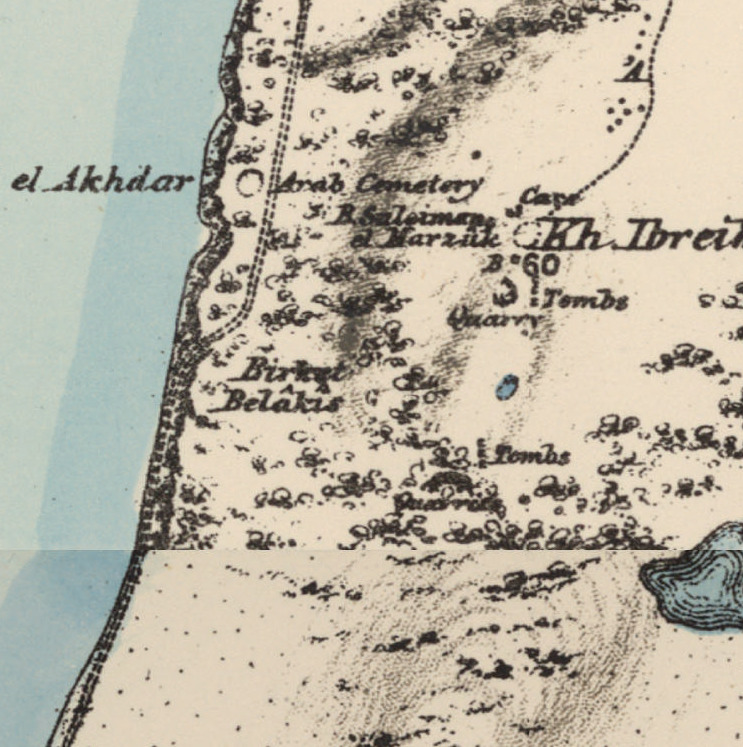
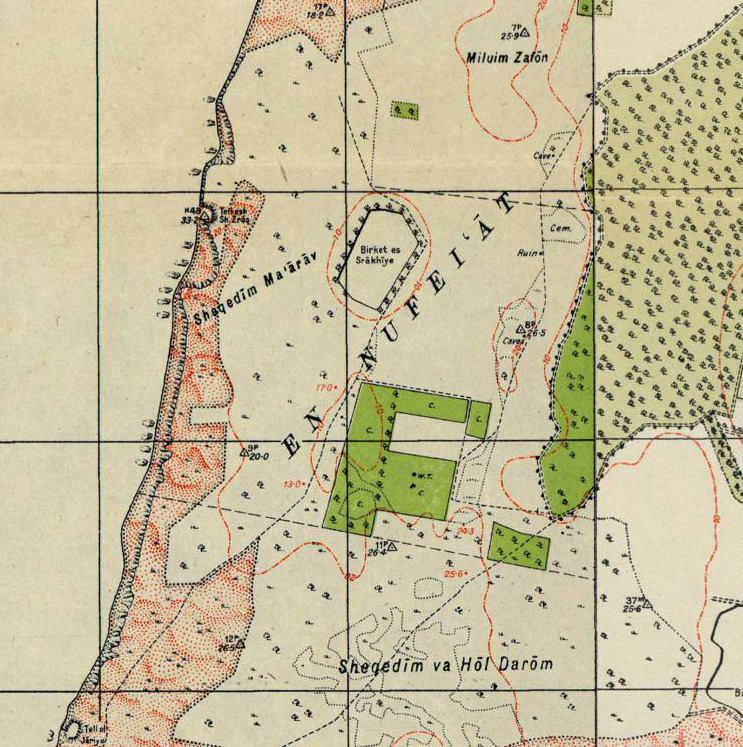
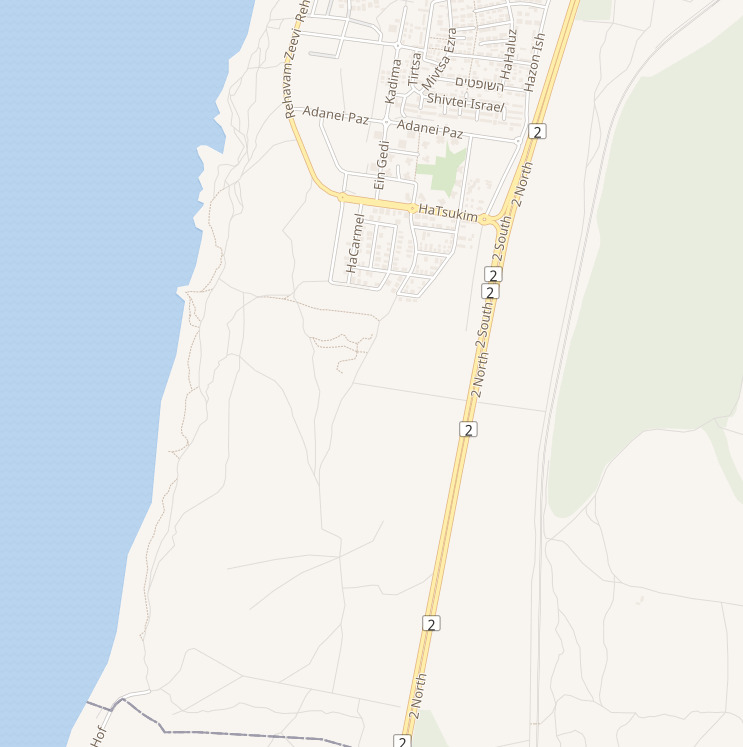
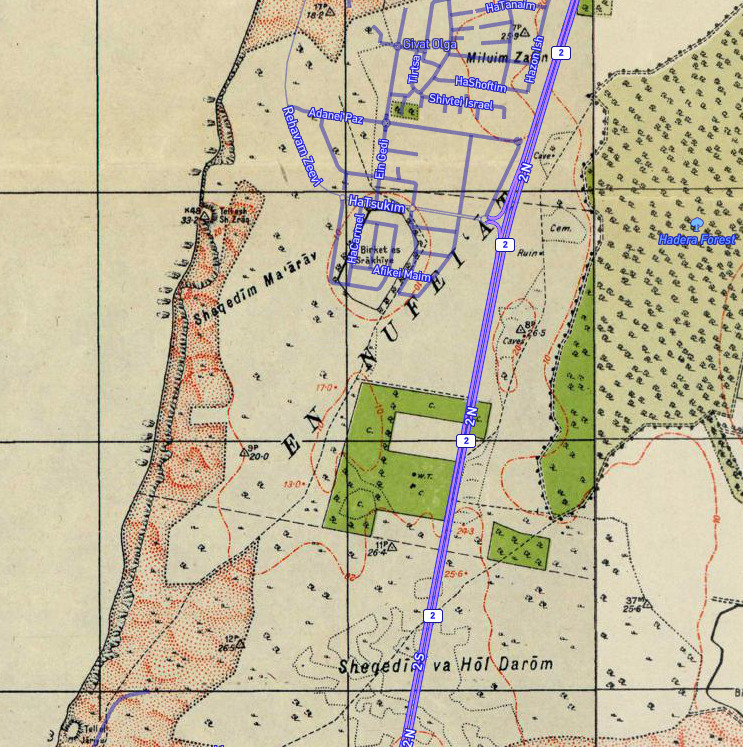
- 1870s map 1940s map modern map 1940s with modern overlay map A series of historical maps of the area around Arab al-Nufay'at (click the buttons)

- Location within Mandatory Palestine
- Coordinates: 32°25′23″N 34°52′54″E
- Palestine grid: 139/202
- Geopolitical entity: Mandatory Palestine
- Subdistrict: Haifa
- Date of depopulation: 10 April 1948

Area
  - Total: 8,937 dunams (8.937 km^{2}; 3.451 sq mi)

Population (1945)
  - Total: 820
- Cause(s) of depopulation: Expulsion by Yishuv forces
- Current Localities: Mikhmoret

Arab al-Nufay'at was a Palestinian Arab village in the Haifa Subdistrict. It was depopulated during the 1947–1948 Civil War in Mandatory Palestine on 10 April 1948. It was located 45 km south of Haifa.

== History ==
The population in the 1945 statistics was 820, all Muslims, with a total of 8,937 dunams of land; of which 1,471 was public land, the rest owned by Jews.

In 1945 Mikhmoret was established on village lands, south of the site.

=== 1948, and after ===
On 6 April 1948, the Haganah implemented a new policy for the coastal plains, namely of clearing the whole area of its Arab inhabitants. On 10 April the villagers of Arab al-Nufay'at, together with the villagers of Arab al-Fuqara and Arab Zahrat al-Dumayri, were ordered to leave the area.

In 1992 the village site was described: "The only traces left of the village is one house, which is still inhabited by an Arab family, and an old mulberry tree. The Israeli army has established a military camp that covers a large area near the site. The rest of the surrounding land is planted in melons, wheat, and barley. Some mulberry and eucalyptus trees grows near the site."

== Bibliography ==
- Department of Statistics (1945). Village Statistics, April, 1945. Government of Palestine.
- Hadawi, S. (1970). Village Statistics of 1945: A Classification of Land and Area ownership in Palestine. Palestine Liberation Organization Research Center.
- Khalidi, W. (1992). All That Remains: The Palestinian Villages Occupied and Depopulated by Israel in 1948. Washington, D.C.: Institute for Palestine Studies. ISBN 0-88728-224-5.
- Morris, B. (2004). The Birth of the Palestinian Refugee Problem Revisited. Cambridge University Press. ISBN 978-0-521-00967-6.
