= Arab al-Fuqara =

Arab al-Fuqara عرب الفقراء/الشيخ حلو
- Etymology: Sheikh Helu, p.n
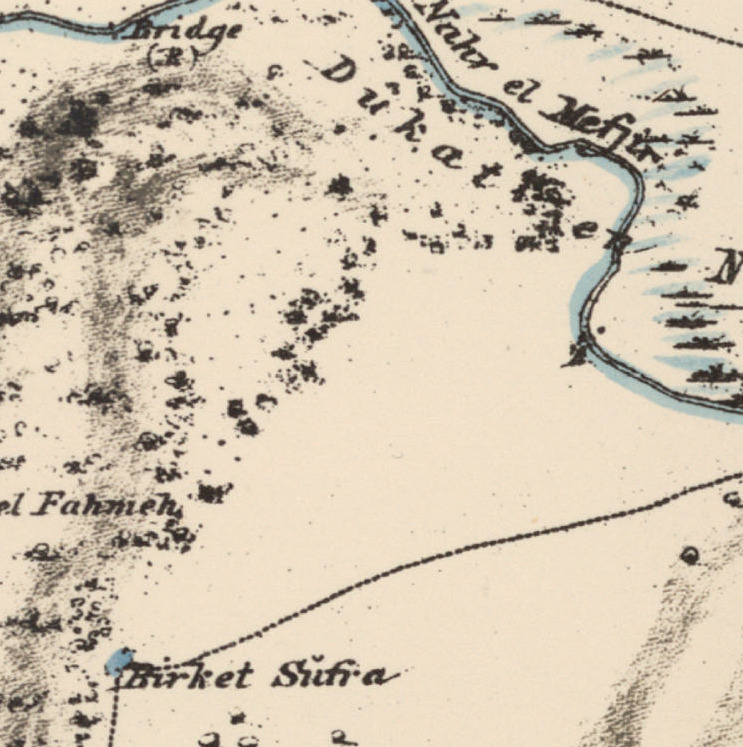
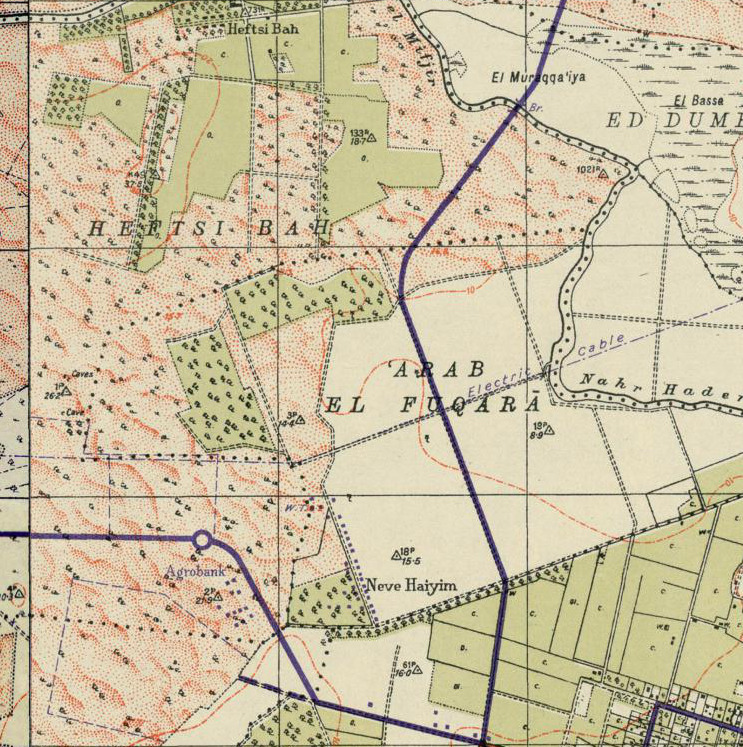
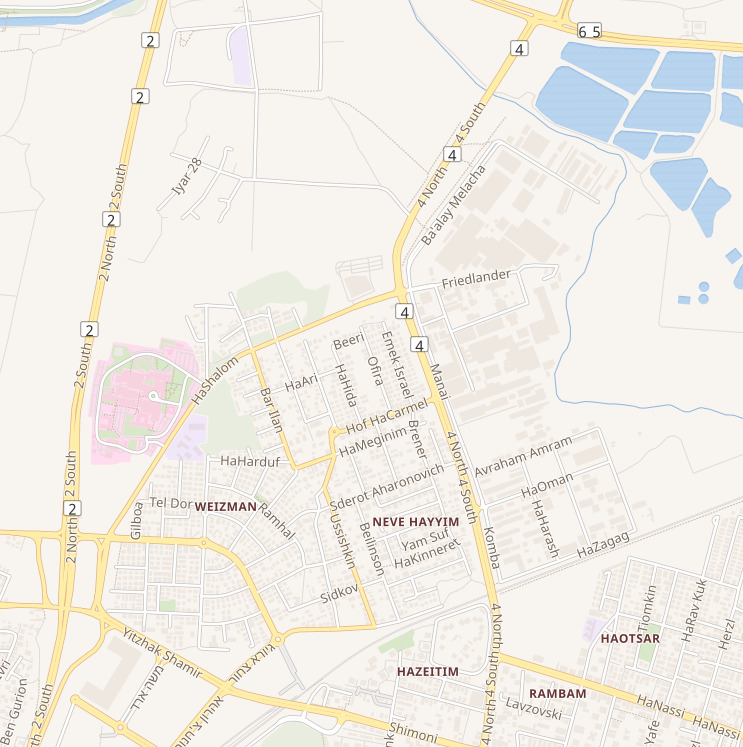
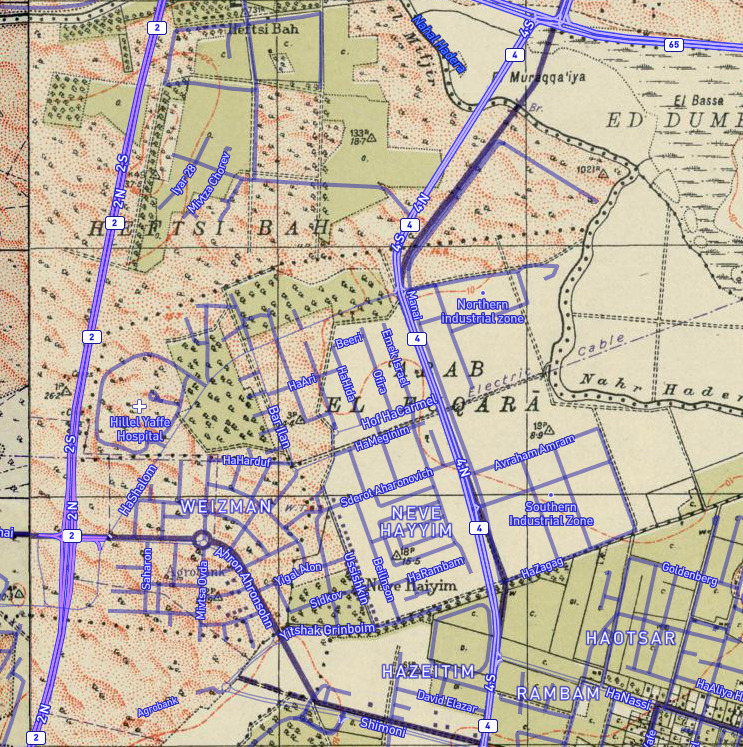
- 1870s map 1940s map modern map 1940s with modern overlay map A series of historical maps of the area around Arab al-Fuqara (click the buttons)

- Location within Mandatory Palestine
- Coordinates: 32°27′08″N 34°54′21″E
- Palestine grid: 140/206
- Geopolitical entity: Mandatory Palestine
- Subdistrict: Haifa
- Date of depopulation: April 10, 1948

Area
  - Total: 15 dunams (1.5 ha; 3.7 acres)

Population (1945)
  - Total: 310
- Cause(s) of depopulation: Expulsion by Yishuv forces
- Current Localities: Hadera

Arab al-Fuqara (Arabic: عرب الفقراء) was a Palestinian Arab village in the Haifa Subdistrict. It was depopulated during the 1947–1948 Civil War in Mandatory Palestine on April 10, 1948. At that time, the land records of the village consisted of a total area of 2,714 dunams, of which 2,513 were owned by Jews, 15 owned by Arabs, and the remaining 186 dunams being public lands.

== Location ==
The village was located 42 km southwest of Haifa, south of Wadi al-Mafjar and northwest of Hadera, in a flat, sandy area.

== History ==
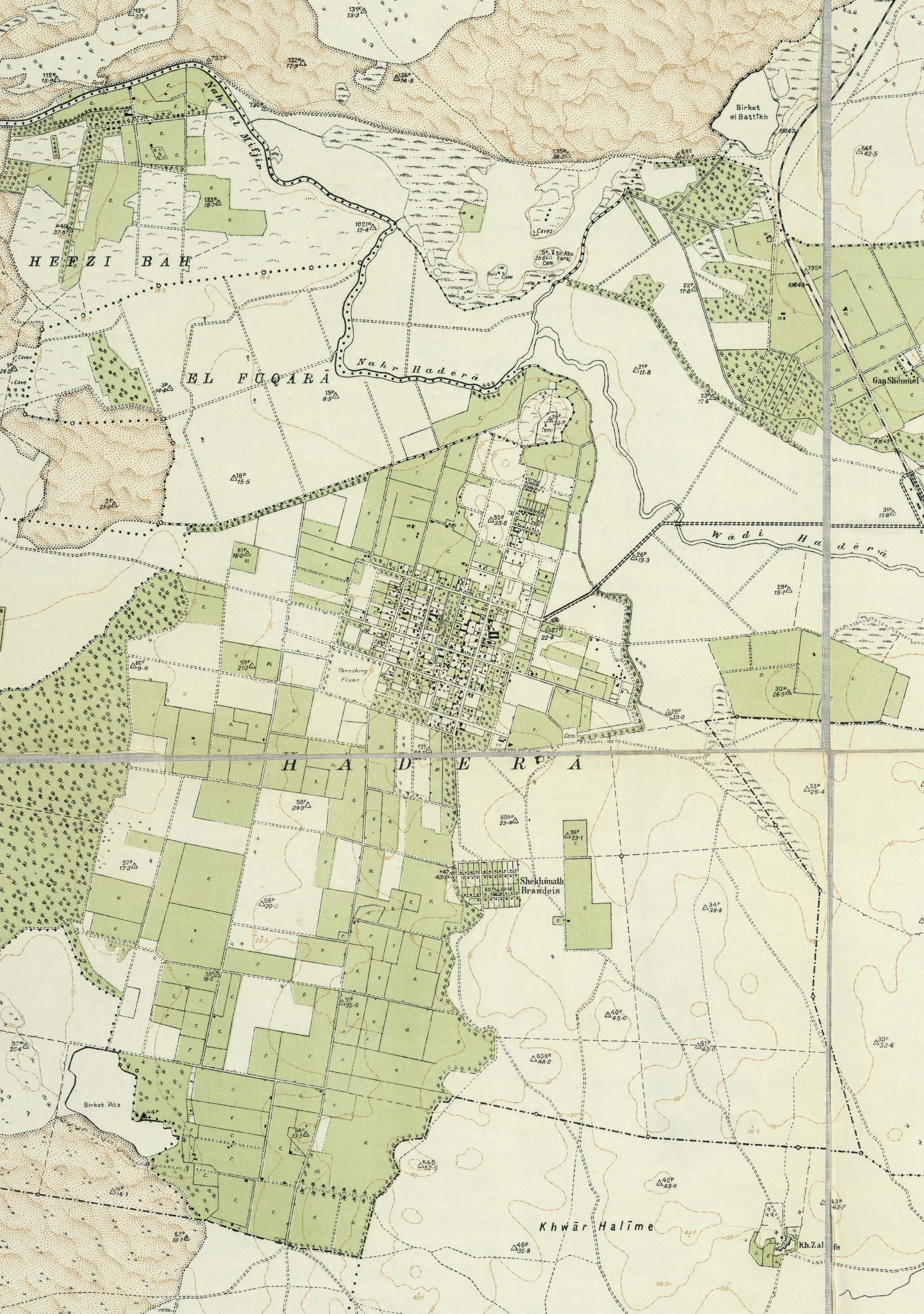
"El Fuqara" land noted in 1932 in the Survey of Palestine, N-W of Hadera

In 1882, the PEF's Survey of Western Palestine (SWP) described a local maqam for Sheikh Helu here, and noted a few adobe houses near, which were not noticed in the official [Government] lists. The maqam belonged to al-Sheikh Muhammad al-Helu, one of the ancestors of the tribe in its current location.

=== British Mandate era ===
The Arab villagers were descendants of a section of the al-Balawina Bedouin tribe, whose primary territory was near Beersheba. The area was generally swampy and malarial, and this limited population growth until the mid-1920s.

The gradual and legal expansion of the Jewish town Hadera reduced the free public land available to the Arab villagers, until only a thin strip of land between Hadera and Wadi al-Mafjar was retained (15 dunams), where the land was considered non-cultivable.

The village population in the 1945 statistics was 310, all Muslims.

=== 1948 and aftermath ===
On 6 April 1948, the Haganah implemented a new policy for the coastal plains, namely of clearing the whole area of its Arab inhabitants. On 10 April, the villagers of Arab al-Fuqara, together with the villagers of Arab al-Nufay'at and Arab Zahrat al-Dumayri, were ordered to leave the area.

Following the 1948 war, the area was incorporated into the State of Israel and the village's land is now part of the northwestern area of Hadera.

== Bibliography ==
- Conder, C.R.; Kitchener, H.H. (1883). The Survey of Western Palestine: Memoirs of the Topography, Orography, Hydrography, and Archaeology. Vol. 3. London: Committee of the Palestine Exploration Fund.
- Government of Palestine, Department of Statistics (1945). Village Statistics, April, 1945.
- Hadawi, S. (1970). Village Statistics of 1945: A Classification of Land and Area ownership in Palestine. Palestine Liberation Organization Research Center.
- Khalidi, W. (1992). All That Remains: The Palestinian Villages Occupied and Depopulated by Israel in 1948. Washington D.C.: Institute for Palestine Studies. ISBN 0-88728-224-5.
- Morris, B. (2004). The Birth of the Palestinian Refugee Problem Revisited. Cambridge University Press. ISBN 978-0-521-00967-6.
- Palmer, E.H. (1881). The Survey of Western Palestine: Arabic and English Name Lists Collected During the Survey by Lieutenants Conder and Kitchener, R. E. Transliterated and Explained by E.H. Palmer. Committee of the Palestine Exploration Fund.
