= Mevo'ot Yam =

Youth village in central Israel

Mevo'ot Yam: מְבוֹאוֹת יָם (Hebrew)
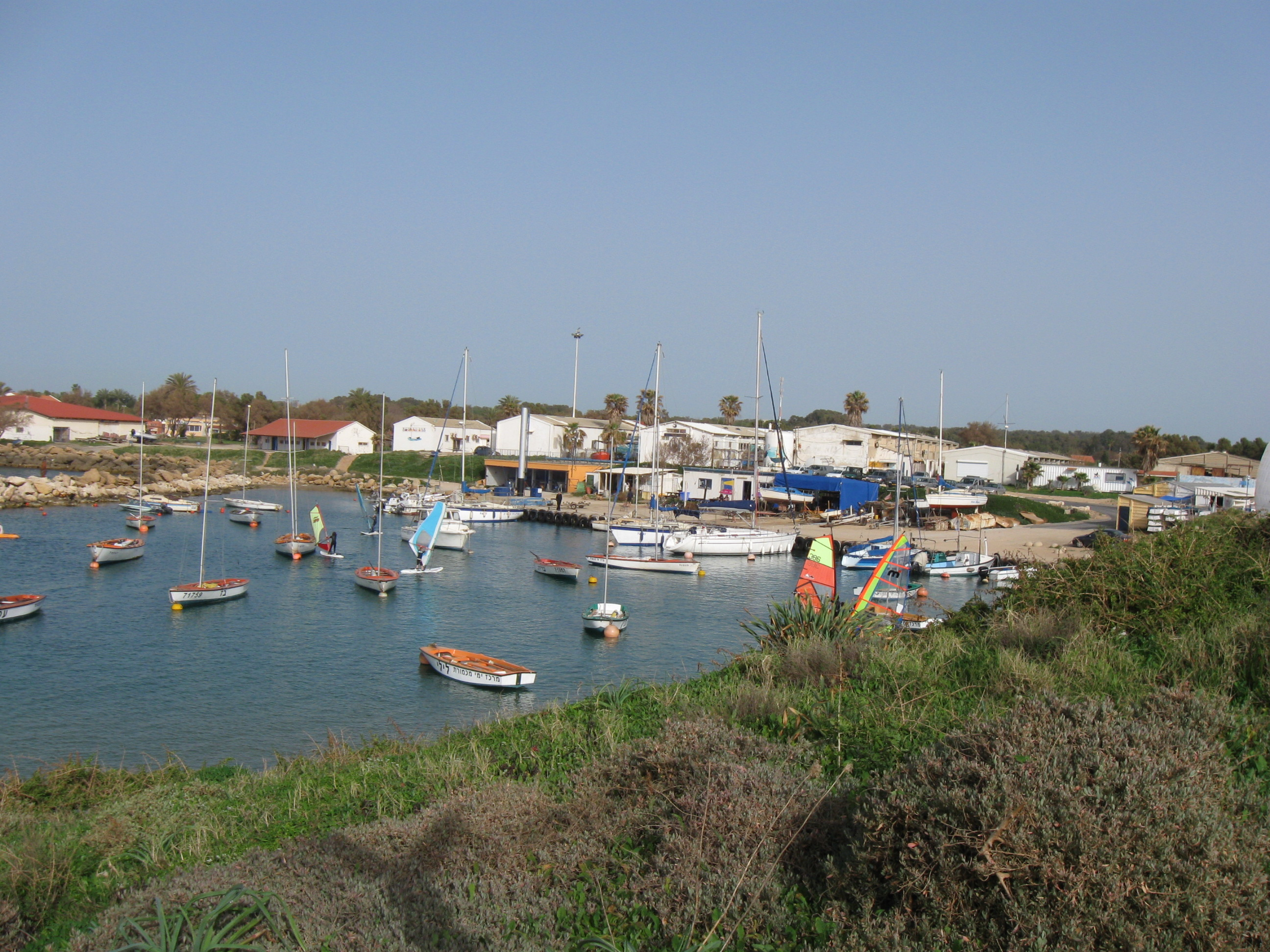

- Location within Central Israel
- Coordinates: 32°24′6″N 34°52′0″E
- Country: Israel
- District: Central
- Subdistrict: HaSharon
- Council: Hefer Valley
- Founded: 1951
- Population (2024): 112
- Website: www.mevoot-yam.co.il

Mevo'ot Yam (Hebrew: מְבוֹאוֹת יָם, lit. Sea Gate) is a youth village on the coast of Israel. Located on the coast of the Mediterranean Sea adjacent to Mikhmoret, it falls under the jurisdiction of Hefer Valley Regional Council. In 2024 it had a student population of 112. Mikhmoret Light is located on a building inside the village.

== History ==
The village was established in 1951 and named after the biblical term for "gateways of the sea" (Ezekiel 27:3) By 1962 it had a population of 400.

In 1999, the Nature and Parks Authority founded the Israeli Sea Turtle Rescue Center in Mevo'ot Yam.

== Education ==
The fishing and trawling school here, Sharon Naval School, founded by the Alliance Israelite Universelle and Israeli government, offers a variety of specialized tracks with an emphasis on nautical studies. Students can study seamanship, electricity, biology and marine agriculture, diving, and a combined course in mechanics, electronics and computers.
