= Vinea Summer Camp =

Dutch travel organisation

The Vinea Summer Camp is the oldest Dutch travel organisation for children and young people, and one of the most notable such organisations in the country. More than 140 types of camps are offered, in the Netherlands and abroad. They organize camps for children aged 7 to 19, some ten thousand each year. Vinea has existed for over sixty years; in these years they organised camps for more than 100,000 children. Vinea's headquarters is located in Utrecht.
