= Mikhmoret =

Moshav in central Israel

Mikhmoret: מכמורת (Hebrew)
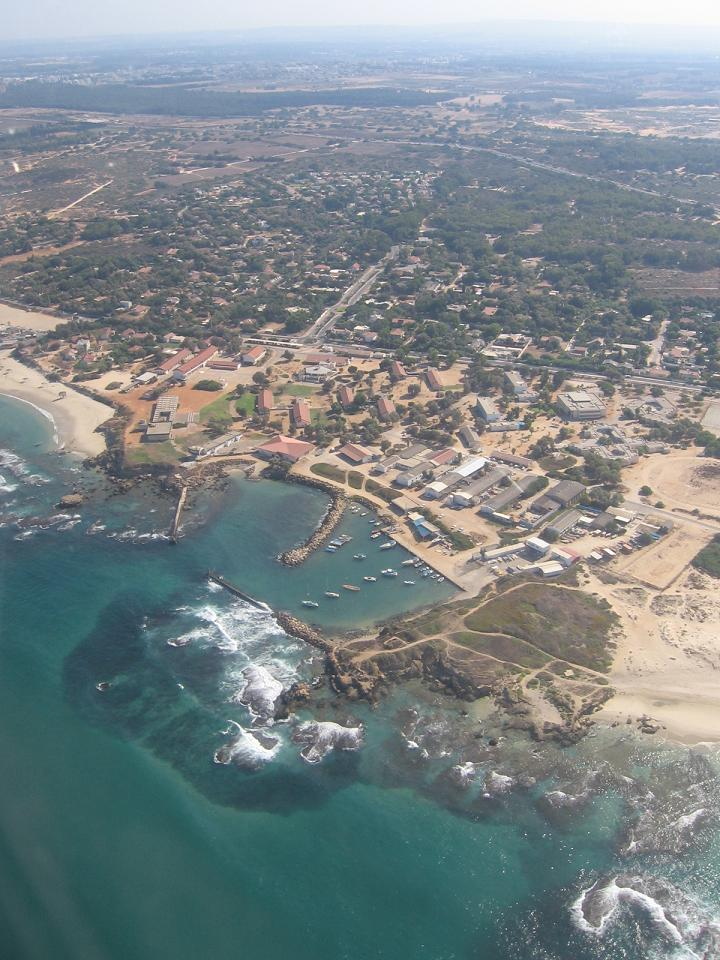
- Etymology: Fishing net
- Location within Central Israel
- Coordinates: 32°24′21″N 34°52′18″E
- Country: Israel
- District: Central
- Subdistrict: HaSharon
- Council: Hefer Valley
- Affiliation: Moshavim Movement
- Founded: 1945
- Founder: Demobbed British Army Jewish soldiers
- Population (2024): 1,314

Mikhmoret (Hebrew: מכמורת, lit. 'Fishing net') is a moshav in central Israel. Located on the coast of the Mediterranean Sea around nine kilometres north of Netanya, it falls under the jurisdiction of Hefer Valley Regional Council. In 2024 it had a population of 1,314.

== History ==
The moshav was founded in 1945 by demobilised soldiers from the British Army, and was named Mikhmoret due to the profession of many of the founders being fishers.

The moshav is located on the former lands of the depopulated Palestinian village of 'Arab al-Nufay'at, whose inhabitants were expelled by an order issued by the Haganah from 10 April 1948.

In 2012 Mikhmoret Beach was listed as one of the best beaches in Israel.

The Israel Nature and Parks Authority established the Sea Turtle Rescue and Rehabilitation Center in Moshav Mikhmoret.

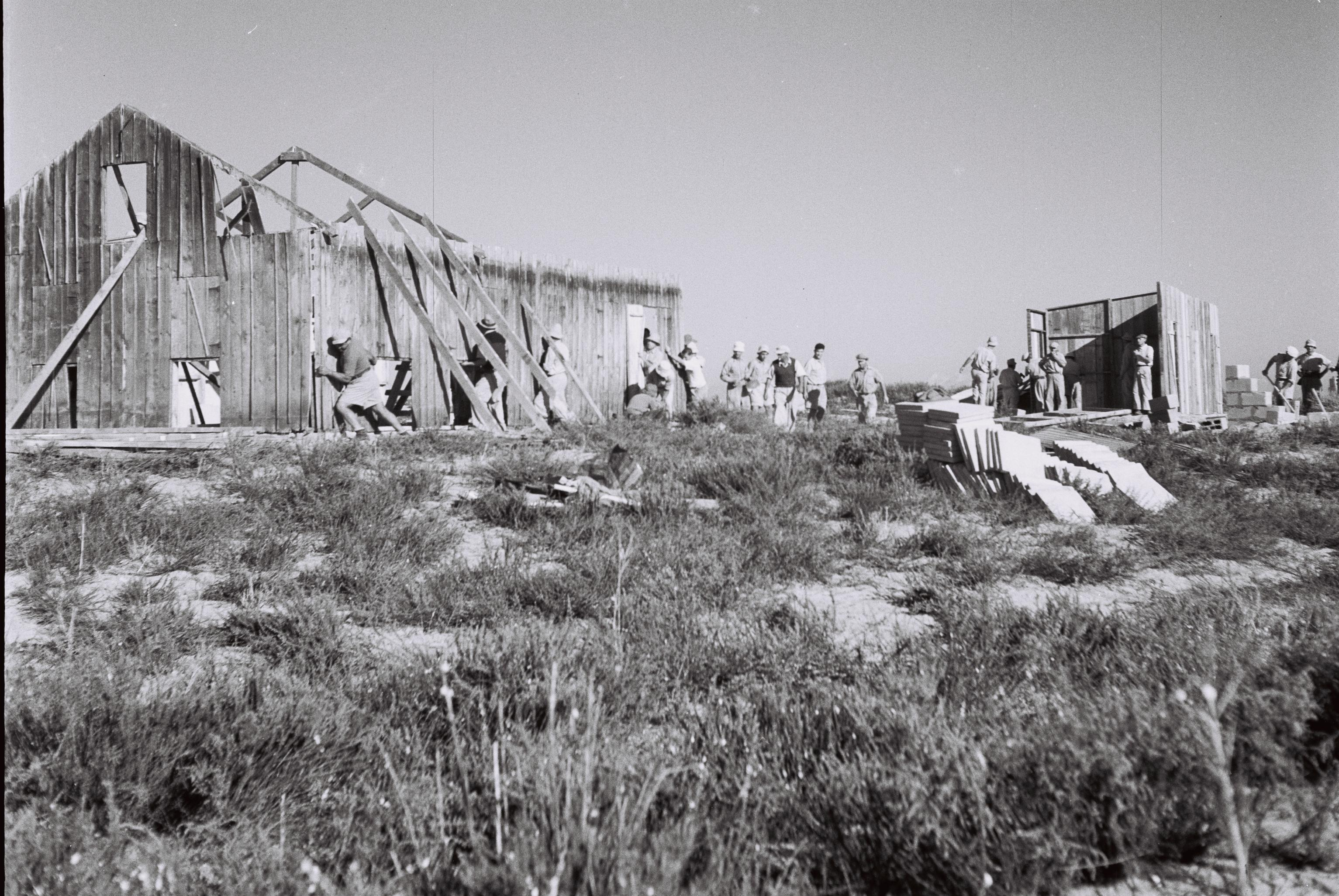
Founding of Michmoret, 1945

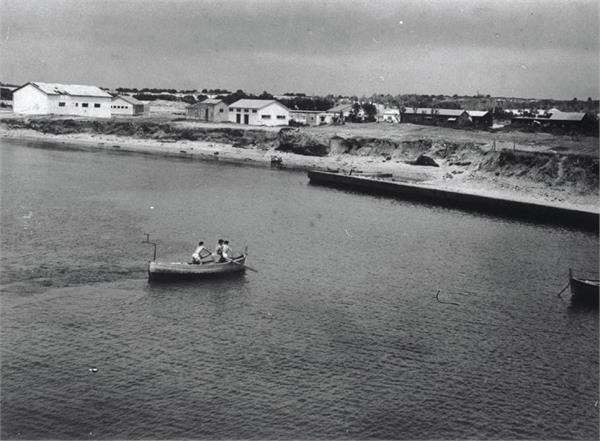
Mikhmoret 1947

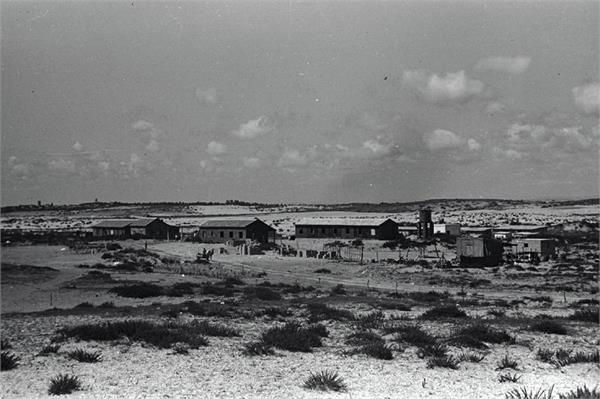
Mikhmoret 1947

== Notable residents ==
- Amit Inbar (born 1972), Olympic competitive windsurfer, and kitesurfer
- Moti Kirschenbaum (born 1939), media personality
- Lee Korzits (born 1984), Olympic and 4-time world champion windsurfer
- Nimrod Mashiah (born 1988), windsurfer
- Avraham Tal (born 1976), Judge in the 4th season of The Voice ישראל.
