= March of Return (Israel) =

Annual Israeli protest

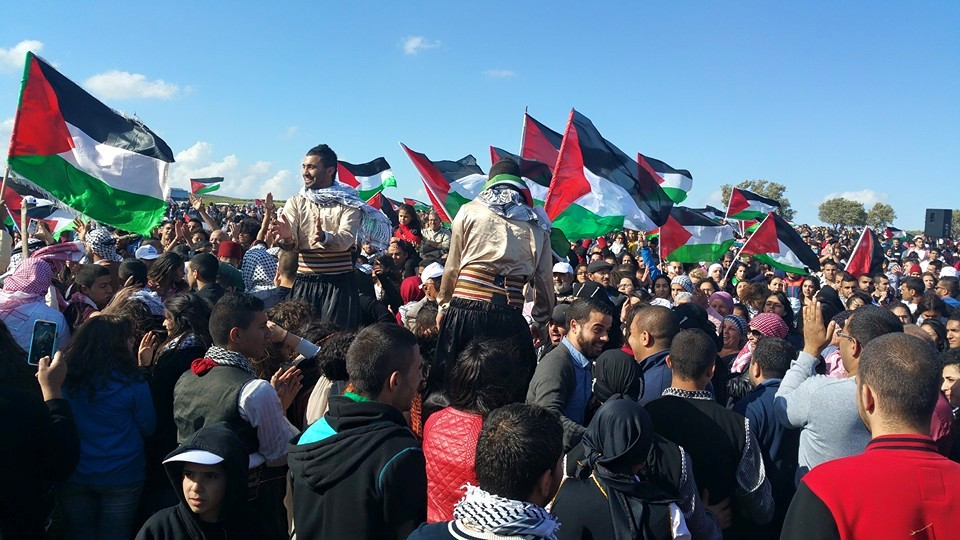
The 2015 March of Return in Hadatha

The March of Return (Arabic: مسيرة العودة, romanized: Masīrat al-ʻAwdah) is an annual protest march in Israel organized by the Association for the Defense of the Rights of the Internally Displaced (ADRID), also known as the Committee of the Uprooted, which represents the "Present absentees", i.e. the Palestinian citizens of Israel who are internally displaced. The march takes place annually on or around Nakba Day or Land Day, with a different destination each year – each year one of the c.400 depopulated Palestinian villages in Israel is chosen.

== Description and history ==
The march traces its origins to the early 1980s when hundreds of Palestinian Israelis marched to commemorate their expulsion from Kafr Bir'im, gradually institutionalizing the practice of private family visits to destroyed villages. The march intersects with the tradition of Land Day commemoration, following the 1976 land confiscations, which diversified in the 1980s to include organized visits to depopulated villages.

The Committee of the Uprooted first organized a Land Day rally in the depopulated village of Al-Ghabisiyya in 1995. In 1998, they named their annual event a "March of Return", beginning a tradition of a mass march to different depopulated villages each year on Nakba Day. The event's secular character, with mixed-gender participation, dabka dancing, and secular music, contrasts with the Palestinian Israeli Islamist factions' more reserved attitude. The marches have been unified, peaceful festivals, contrasting with Nakba Day events in the West Bank that have been marked by confrontations and violence against the Israeli occupation of the West Bank.

The Committee of the Uprooted orchestrates the marches in conjunction with Israeli authorities, aiming to avoid provocation and maintain positive relations with Israeli Jewish communities. Efforts include discipline in protest expressions, careful route planning to avoid conflicts with Jewish localities, and refraining from marching to certain villages. Jewish participation, including speakers and organizational involvement, has been consistently maintained, though it remains a largely Palestinian-led initiative.

== Destinations and attendance ==
The list below summarizes the destinations of the marches, and where known, the attendance:

- 2026: Scheduled for Damun, cancelled by Israeli police for second year in a row.
- 2025: Scheduled for Miska, Tulkarm, cancelled following threats from the Israeli police and their refusal to allow the march to proceed as in previous years.
- 2024: Hawsha and Khirbat Al-Kasayir, 15,000 attendees
- 2023: Lajjun
- 2022: Mi'ar
- 2021: Al-Dumun (mostly online due to Covid)
- 2019: Khubbayza
- 2018: Atlit
- 2017: Al-Kabri, initially 25,000 attendees anticipated and blocked by Israeli government. Route changed and proceeded.
- 2016: Wadi Subala (Tiyaha bedouin)
- 2015: Hadatha
- 2014: Lubya, 20,000 attendees, the largest Nakba demonstration in Israel ever at that time
- 2013: Khubbayza, 7,000 attendees
- 2012: Kuwaykat and Amka
- 2011 Al-Ruways and Al-Dumun
- 2010 Miska
- 2009 Al-Kafrayn
- 2008: Saffuriya
- 2007: Lajjun
- 2006 Umm az-Zinat
- 2005 Hawsha and Khirbat Al-Kasayir
- 2004 Indur
- 2003 Umm az-Zinat
- 2002 Al-Birwa
- 2001 Ma'alul
- 2000 Al-Dumun
- 1999: Saffuriya
- 1998: Al-Ghabisiyya

== See also ==
- 2018–2019 Gaza border protests, a similar event in Gaza in 2018–19
- Al-Aqsa is in danger, a large event amongst the Islamic community in Israel

== Biography ==
- Järvi, Tiina (2021-10-02). "Demonstrating the desired future: performative dimensions of internally displaced Palestinians' return activities". Geografiska Annaler: Series B, Human Geography. 103 (4): 380–396. doi:10.1080/04353684.2021.1876524. ISSN 0435-3684.
- Sorek, Tamir (2015). "The March of Return and the Religious-Secular Divide". Palestinian Commemoration in Israel: Calendars, Monuments, and Martyrs. Stanford Studies in Middle Eastern and Islamic Societies and Cultures. Stanford University Press. pp. 72–80. ISBN 978-0-8047-9520-3.
- Wermenbol, Grace (2021-05-27). "4 - Recreating and Reclaiming the Lost Homeland: The March of Return". A Tale of Two Narratives: The Holocaust, the Nakba, and the Israeli-Palestinian Battle of Memories. Cambridge University Press. doi:10.1017/9781108885430.007. ISBN 978-1-108-88543-0.
