= March of Return =

March of Return may refer to:

- The 2018–2019 Gaza border protests, commonly known as the Great March of Return
- The March of Return (Israel)
