= Association for the Defense of the Rights of the Internally Displaced =

The Association for the Defense of the Rights of the Internally Displaced (ADRID) (Arabic: جمعية الدفاع عن حقوق المهجرين) is a non-governmental Palestinian organization in Israel that focuses on defending the right of internally displaced Palestinians, often known as "present absentees," to return to their lands and their homes.

Among the association's activities are organizing the annual March of Return to commemorate the Nakba. These marches began in the late 1990s, coinciding with Nakba Day and Israel's Independence Day. ADRID has worked in cooperation with other NGOs, among them the High Follow-Up Committee and Zochrot, in coordinating such activities.

== History ==
The association was created in the mid-1990s, prompted by the perception of many Palestinians at the time that the negotiations processes in Madrid and Oslo were not adequately defending the right of return of refugees, including those residing both inside and outside of historic Palestine. Although their conventions and activities began in the 1990s, they only became legally registered as an NGO in Israel in the year 2000.

== See also ==
- High Follow-Up Committee for Arab Citizens of Israel
- Land Day
