= Usha (ancient city) =

Ancient Jewish town

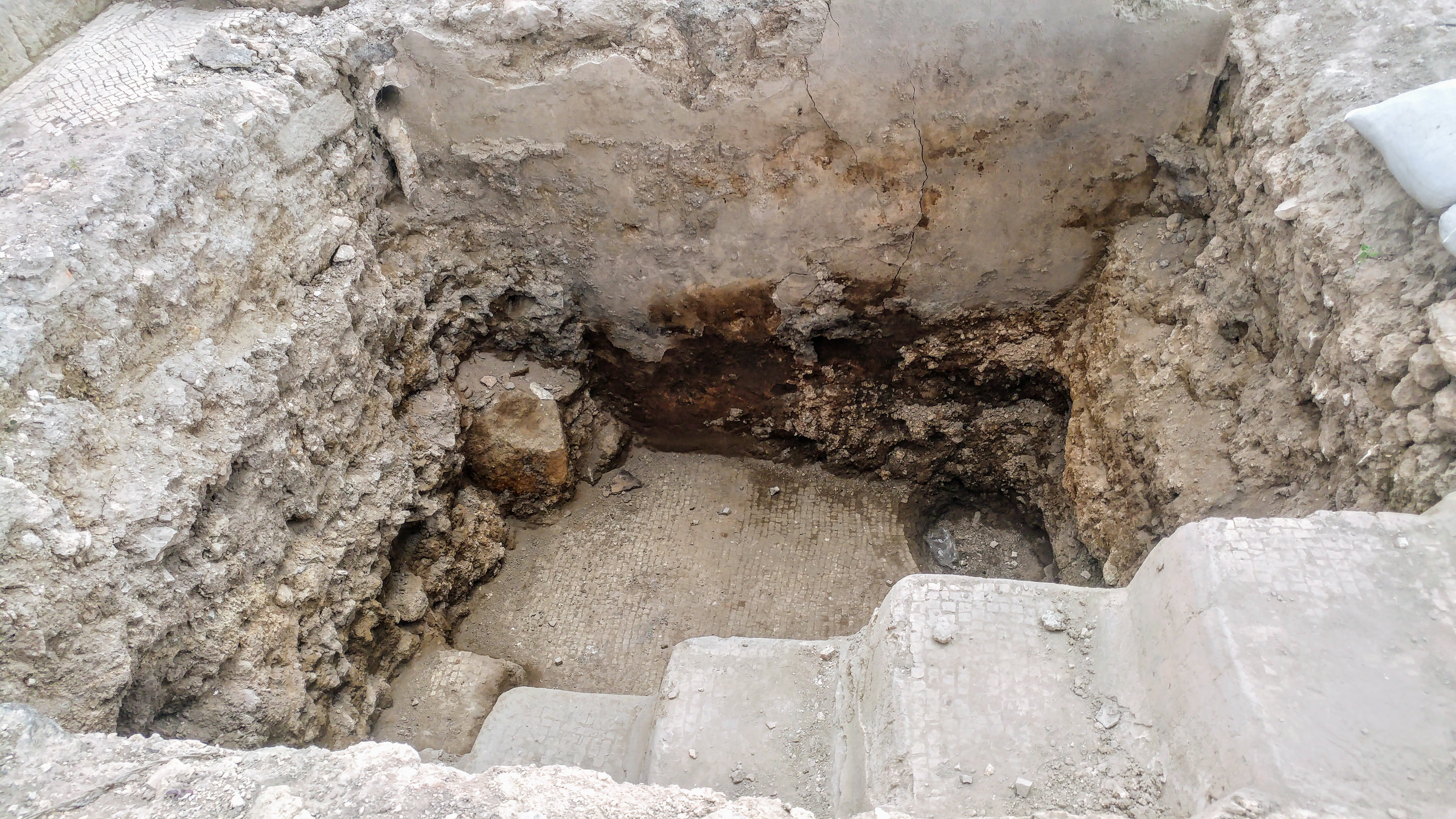
- Jewish ritual bath discovered at Usha

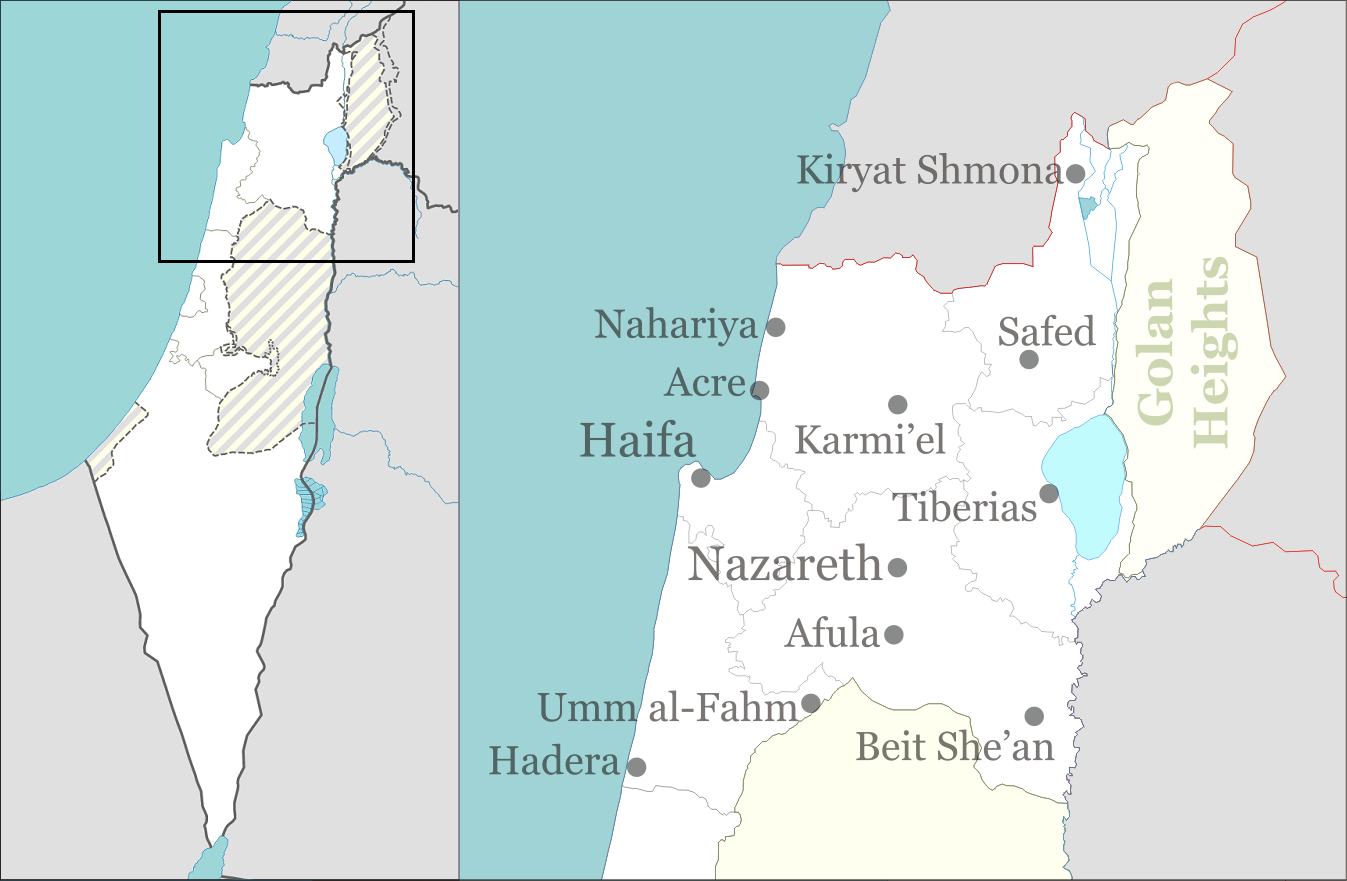
- Location of Usha within Haifa District of Israel Location of Usha within Israel
- 32.799414°N 35.146701°E
- Location: Israel
- Region: Western Galilee

Site notes
- Condition: ruins
- Public access: yes

Usha (Hebrew: אושא) was an ancient Jewish town in the western part of Galilee. It was identified in the late 19th century by Victor Guérin, who found the ruins on which the Arab village of Hawsha was built.

The modern kibbutz of Usha, Israel is located several kilometers to the west. The site is close to the town of Kiryat Ata.

== History and archaeology ==
=== Habitation periods ===
Archaeological excavations began at the site in 2008 until 2012, another dig took place in 2014 just along the southwestern fringes of Horbat. These excavations led to the conclusion that the site had been continuously inhabited from the Persian period through the Roman period until it was abandoned in the 8th century. During the Ottoman period There were additional findings indicating habitation in the Persian period next to pottery from the Hellenistic period.

After the Bar Kokhba Revolt the Sanhedrin left Yavne in 135 and settled for a period of 10 years in Usha, which was already a Jewish town from the Persian period. According to Amitzur, Usha started being mentioned in Jewish sources in the first century CE.

The Jerusalem Post cites the Israel Antiquities Authority as stating that the second period of significant inhabitance was during the Ottoman period when, starting in the late 18th century, a village was established there, which existed until the 1948 Arab–Israeli War.

=== Biblical connection ===
They were attempts to connect the site to the biblical site of Hosah, mentioned in the book of Joshua. The connection between the two is considered as yet unknown, but most researchers tend to identify it with Tell Rashidiyeh or Khirbet el-Hos, today both in Lebanon, one south of modern Tyre, and one southeast of Tyre.

=== Roman- and Byzantine-period Jewish city ===
==== Identification ====
19th-century researchers such as Leopold Zunz and those from the Palestine Exploration Fund (PEF), as well as archeologitst from the Israel Antiquity Authority have identified the site as Usha a Jewish town from the Persian period that during the Roman and Byzantine period was the seat of the Sanhedrin after the Bar Kokhba revolt.

==== Seat of the Sanhedrin (2nd century) ====
Usha came to renown in the 2nd century (c. 135), after the Hadrianic persecutions, when the Sanhedrin, or rabbinic court, was moved from Yavne in Judea to Usha, and then from Usha back to Yavne, and a second time from Yavne to Usha. The Sanhedrin's final location was in Tibereas, where it ceased to exist after 425 CE, as Emperor Theodosius VI prevented the appointment of a successor for Raban Gamliel VI.

The Sanhedrin's settlement in Usha indicates the ultimate spiritual supremacy of Galilee over Judea, the latter having become depopulated after the Bar Kokhba revolt. Usha was also important because some of the pupils of Rabbi Akiva resided there, including Shimon Bar Yochai, Judah bar Ilai, whose original home was in Usha, Jose ben Halafta, and Rabbi Meir. The site received prominence after a Talmudic passage which names the boundary between Usha and Shefa-Amr as the place where Judah ben Bava met his death after ordaining seven elders and disciples of Rabbi Akiva.

==== Findings; economy ====
Underground hiding complexes

In 2012, a hiding complex, carved out probably no later than the Bar Kokhba revolt, was found to cut through and put out of use an earlier Mikveh.

Ritual baths, oil & wine industries

Two Jewish ritual baths (mikvehs or mikva'ot) with plastered walls and steps, carved out of the living rock in the 2nd century and kept in use until the 6th, were discovered near wine and olive oil production facilities. The immediate proximity to the industrial area indicates that workers purified themselves by immersion before work, in order to produce kosher oil and wine. The mikvehs were filled in at the time when the Jews left the village (c. 6th century).

The size and complexity of the olive oil and wine producing installations indicate that these were among the primary industries and sources of income for the Jewish inhabitants, who processed the produce of the olive orchards and vines which they grew on the gentle hills in the area.

Glass industry

The other major local industry dealt in glass production. Witness are the numerous remains of delicate wine glasses and glass lamps found next to raw glass lumps. The fragments come in shades of pale blues and greens and a beautiful finish, their quality and quantity bearing witness to the proficiency of the local glassblowers. One of them seems to have been Rabbi Isaac Nappaha, known from Rabbinical sources and whose by-name is based on the Hebrew root for "to blow".

Smithy

In 2019, the IAA published the discovery of an iron hammer-head, a rare find for the Byzantine period, along with nails and iron slag discovered together at Usha and dated to about 1400 years ago, finds which prove that the town's inhabitants also worked in metallurgy. According to Amitzur, the inhabitants of Usga knew the art of making tools: "This slag gave the IAA archeologists the clue that helped them conclude that Usha’s inhabitants didn’t just take the family donkey down the road to a Kol-Bo bazaar selling merchandise from afar – they themselves knew how to manufacture iron tools". Regarding Rabbi Yitzhak Nafha, his by-name would be generally associated in Rabbinical-period Hebrew with "blacksmith", but in his time the smithy was not in operation, while the large glass industry was, which makes Amitzur associate it with glassblowing.

== Rabbinic enactments made at Usha ==
The rabbis who settled in Usha were active in making many reforms, under the leadership of Simeon ben Gamaliel II. They ruled in favor of several legal enactments, such as making it compulsory upon Jewish fathers to support their small children by providing sustenance unto them, until they were able to provide for themselves, and that if the Av Beit Din "President of a Court" was known to have transgressed, he was not to be excommunicated as a first resort, but rather asked to simply "show self-respect" by resigning his post. If he persisted in the same act, only then would he be excommunicated by the community.

The court at Usha also ruled that if a wife, during the life of her husband, conveyed any of her private possessions to another, her husband has got the first right of refusal and may recover such items from the hands of the purchaser. The court, moreover, augmented the earlier rabbinic decrees concerning the defilement of foreign lands, making the air-space of foreign lands capable of disqualifying the Terumah (heave-offering eaten by the priests of Aaron's lineage), and that, if it had made contact with the earth from the same lands, required it to be burnt.

Likewise, the court passed a law making it unlawful for any person to be wasteful with his own money, goods or property, and that he is not to expend more than one-fifth (20%) in charitable or philanthropic causes.

The rabbis of Usha also decided in the case of citron fruits that their time of picking determined their tithing status and bi'ur (time of removal). For example, if they were picked during any time of the regular yearly cycle, they are deemed as not having Seventh-year sanctity, even if picked one day following the Seventh-year and had grown during the Seventh-year. If picked at the very onset of the Seventh-year, even though they grew in an ordinary year, they are deemed as Seventh-year produce and the laws of removal (bi'ur) would apply to them.

Judah bar Ilai recalled that, in his youth, he stood up on Purim to read from the Scroll of Esther in his hometown of Usha, and that he was not rebuked by the Chazal for doing so publicly, and as a mere child. The exemplum shown by the Sages led to an easing of strictures, whereby youth, from that time forward, were permitted to read the Megillah ("Scroll of Esther") in public.

A record of the place's material culture has been preserved in the writings of the rabbis in the 6th century. In Usha, for example, they produced mats from natural fibers to be used as a utilitarian item, and which, because of its unique shape and design, was unfit for use as a covering in a sukkah, but could be used to sleep on.

== Archaeological exploration ==
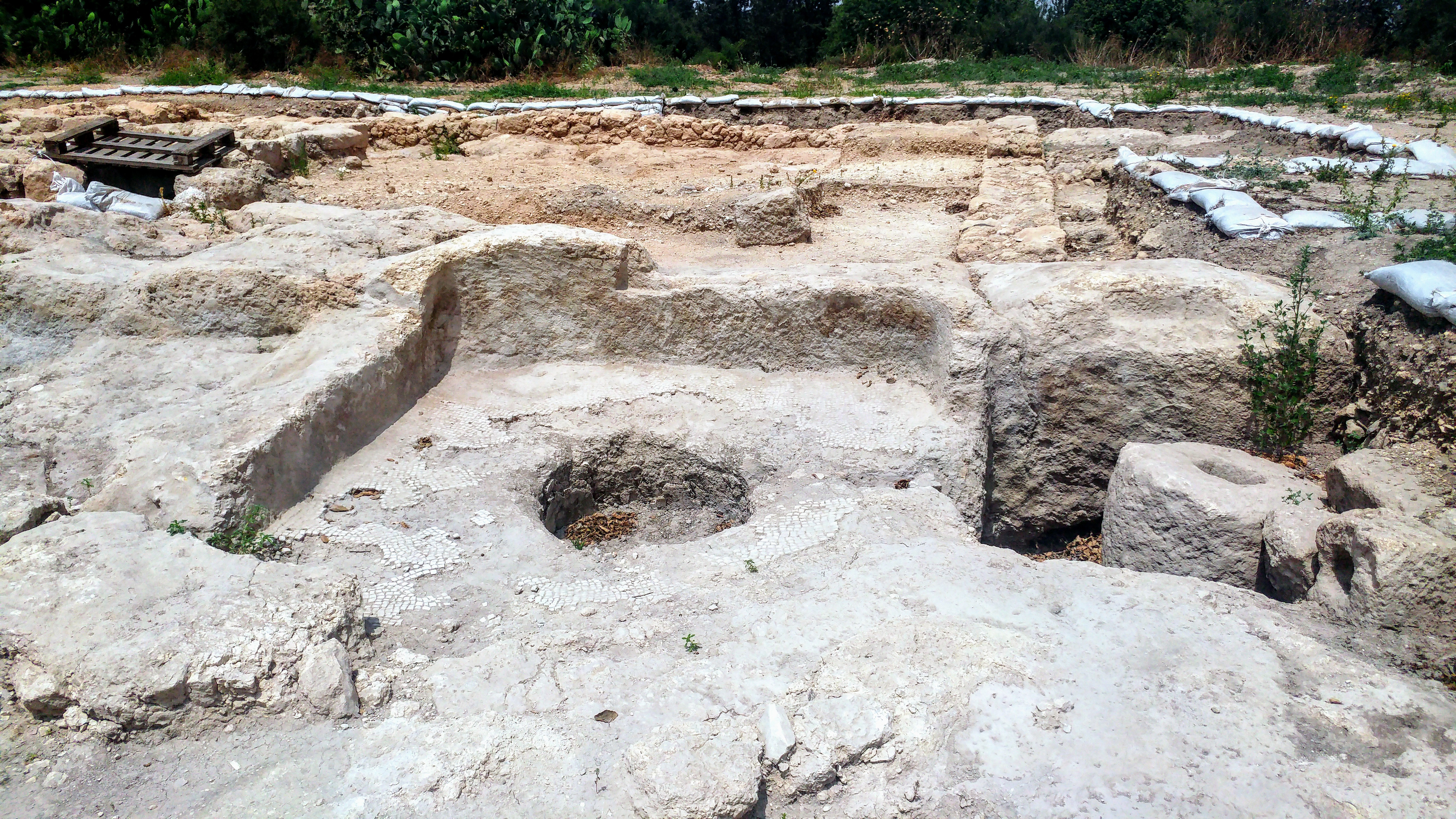
Ruins of ancient Usha

In 2004, a survey of the "Khirbet/Horbat/Hurvat Usha" site was made by the IAA. From 2008 - 2012, archaeological surveys and excavations were conducted at Khirbet Usha by Aviram oshri, Abdallah Massarwa and Ella Nagorski on behalf of the IAA. The excavations kept going up to 2019. In October 2019, traces of metallurgical activities from the Byzantine period were unearthed.

== Archaeological park and Sanhedrin Trail Project ==
In 2009, Hurvat Usha was declared a National Park of Israel, an area spanning over 263 dunams (nearly 65 acres).

The archaeological excavations at Usha are included in the Sanhedrin Trail Project initiated by the IAA, which touches on the stations of the Sanhedrin through Galilee, leading from Bet She'arim in the west to Tiberias in the east.
