= Hawsha =

Hawsha هوشة Husha, Khirbat Husha, Khǔrbet Hǔsheh
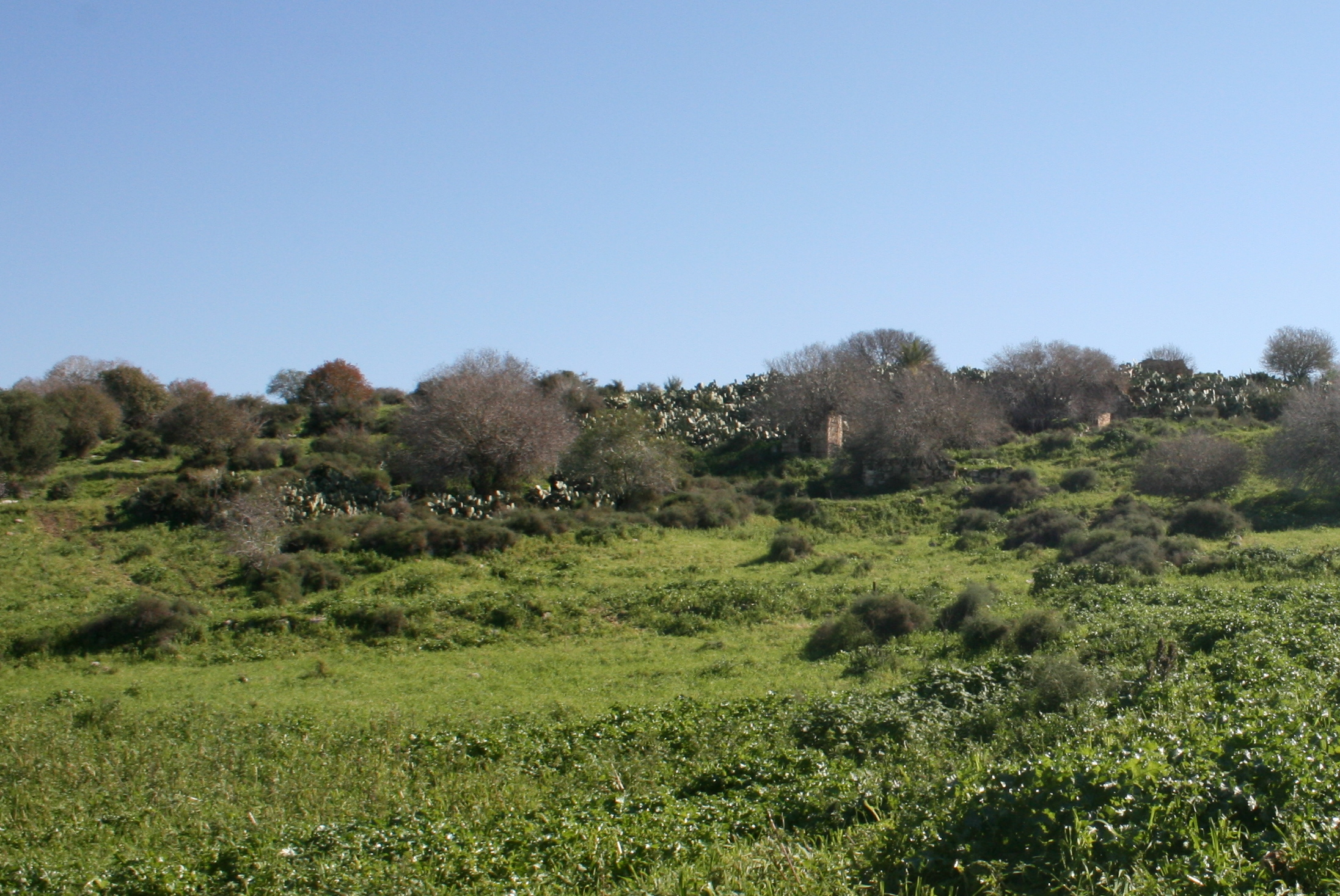
- Remains of Hawsha in the winter of 2010
- Etymology: Joshua or Kh. Husheh; "The ruin of Husheh",
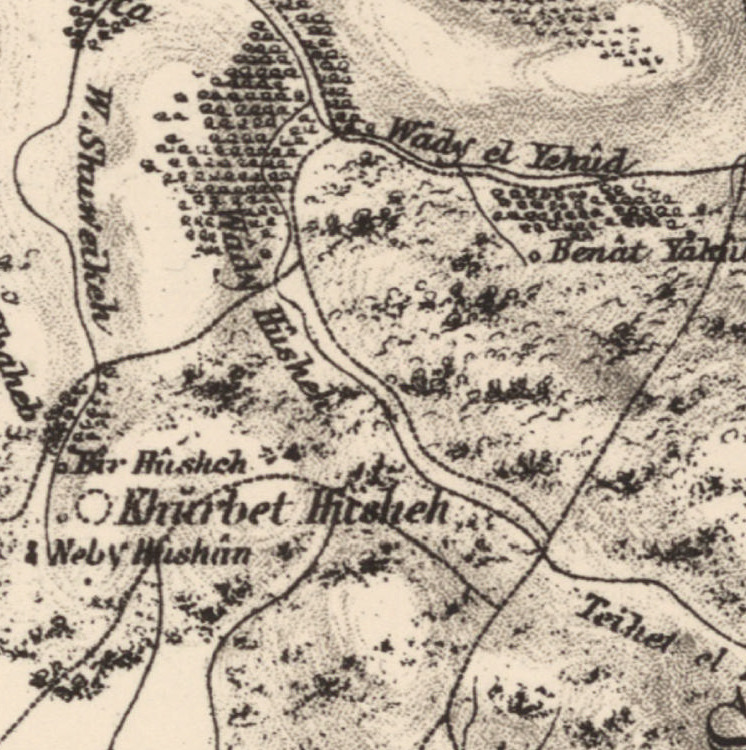
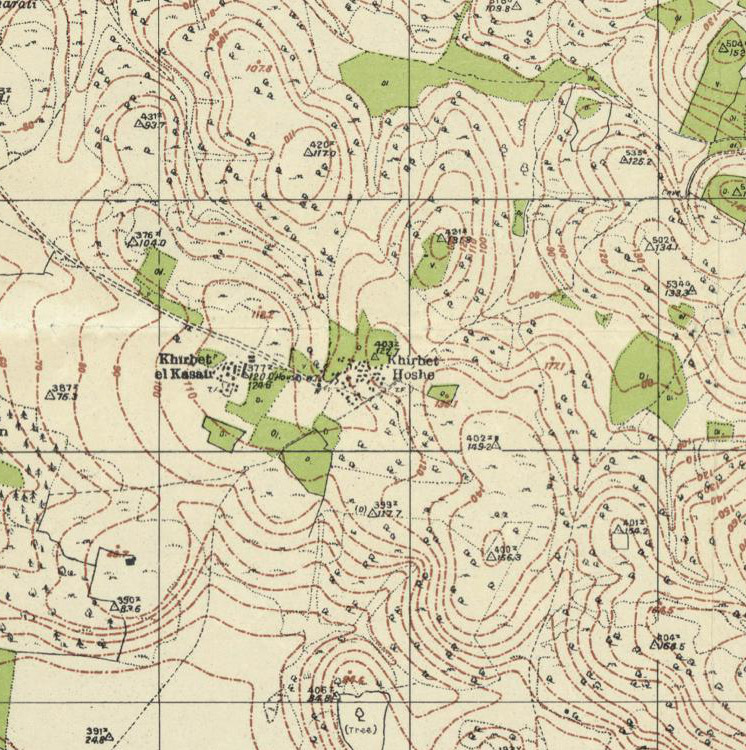
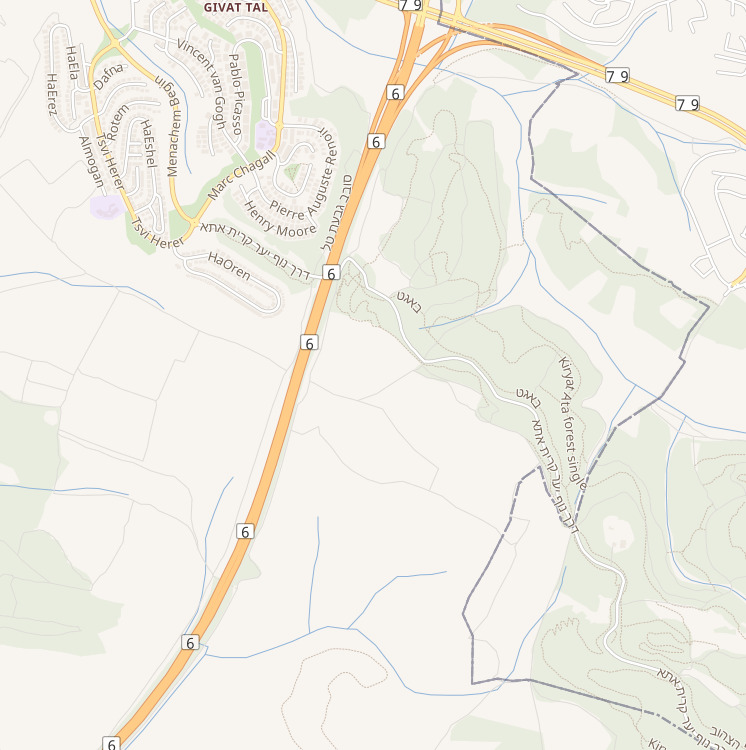
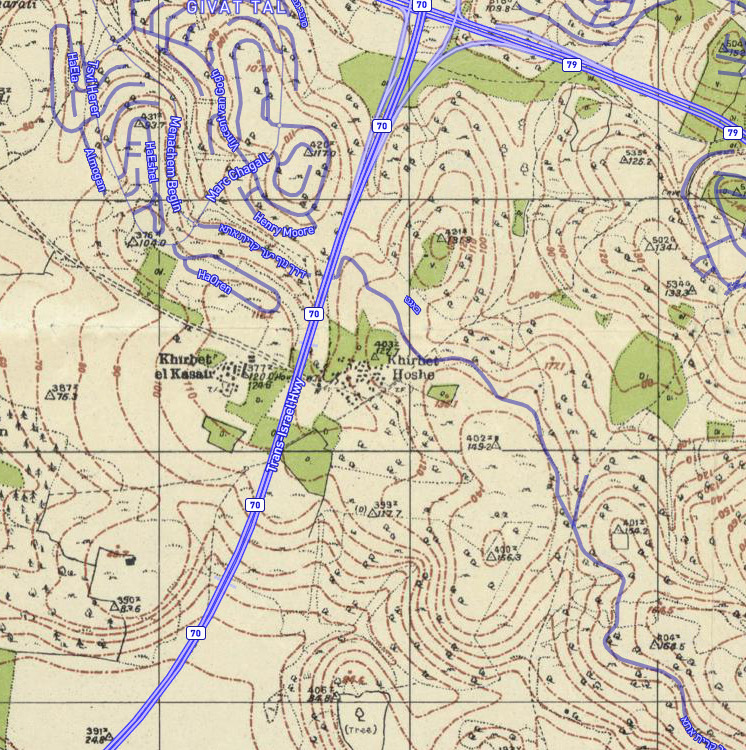
- 1870s map 1940s map modern map 1940s with modern overlay map A series of historical maps of the area around Hawsha (click the buttons)

- Location within Mandatory Palestine
- Coordinates: 32°47′36″N 35°08′41″E
- Palestine grid: 163/244
- Geopolitical entity: Mandatory Palestine
- Subdistrict: Haifa
- Date of depopulation: mid-April, 1948

Area
  - Total: 901 dunams (90.1 ha; 223 acres)

Population (1945)
  - Total: 400
- Cause(s) of depopulation: Military assault by Yishuv forces

Hawsha (Arabic: هوشة, Hǔsheh, also Husha, or Hosha), was an Arab village established in 1880 by Maghrebi immigrants of Algerian origin, built on ruins of the ancient Jewish town Usha. The place is located 13 kilometers (8.1 mi) east of Haifa, about 100 meters (330 ft) above sea level.

During the late Roman period, Hawsha was the site of the ancient Jewish town of Usha, which was the seat of the Sanhedrin. Ruins on the site include ancient mosaics and tombs. The village had a Maqam (shrine) for Nabi Hushan.

In 1945, it had a population of 580 inhabitants, 400 of whom were Arab Muslims and 180 of whom were Jewish. The built-up area of the village was 50 dunums, and 717 dunums were used for agriculture. All but 7 dunums of public land were owned by Jews by this time.

Hawsha was depopulated during the 1947–1948 Civil War in Mandatory Palestine on April 16, 1948, as part of the Battle of Ramat Yohanan.

== Location ==
The village was located on a low hilly area between the plain of Haifa and Marj ibn Amr (Jezreel Valley) and situated on an east–west axis. To the west lay a wide valley, Wadi Husheh, that was the dividing area between it and the neighboring village of Khirbat al-Kasayir.

== History ==
=== Israelite city? ===
19th-century researchers have connected Hawsha to the biblical village of Hosah (Chossah), a border settlement of the Israelite tribe of Asher. More recently, this biblical city tends to be identified with archaeological sites closer to Tyre.

=== Roman and Byzantine-period Jewish city ===
Usha was visited by 19th-century researchers such as Leopold Zunz and those from the Palestine Exploration Fund (PEF), among others, have identified Hawsha as the site of the Roman and Byzantine period Jewish city of Usha, the seat of the Sanhedrin after AD 135.

=== Crusader domain ===
Hawsha was mentioned as part of the domain of the Crusaders during the hudna between the Crusaders based in Acre and the Mamluk sultan al-Mansur Qalawun, declared in 1283.

=== Ottoman period: shrine, ancient ruins, well ===
Under the rule of the Ottoman Empire, the lands at Hawsha belonged to the inhabitants of Shefa 'Amr. The site contained many ancient ruins, parts of which were used to build some structures, including a shrine known as Maqam Nabi Hushan, a well (Bir Husheh), and tombstones. William M. Thomson, writing in 1859, identifies the shrine as Neby Hǔshǎ, which he translates as the "Prophet Joshua," and describes it as a "white-domed mazar [...] a place of great resort." In the Survey of Western Palestine (SWP; 1838), it is noted that the Prophet Hosea is said to be buried near "Kh. Husheh."^{[i]} Also in the village was a mosaic floor from an ancient building.

V. Guérin, who visited the site in 1875, provides a lengthy description of the ancient ruins in evidence throughout the area. He states his belief that this is the site of ancient Usha and speculates that the ruins of a finely built edifice, in which there are the remnants of many columns, was a synagogue. He then says a synagogue of Ousha should be constructed if there is not already such a place of worship in the vicinity. Also noting the presence of the domed wali of Neby Houchan consecrated to the prophet Hosea, he cites the Muslim tradition that this prophet is here interred. He describes the shrine as being constructed of what appear to be ancient stones, with what seems to be a mihrab at its base, noting there are shreds of clothing strewn and floating about it.

In an 1890 quarterly statement for the PEF, the ancient ruins of Hawsha are described as follows: "This ruin [...] must have been an important place, to judge from the mass of building stones and the fragments of columns lying about. Now that the grass is dried up a regular city wall can be traced. On the main road running from the well towards the ruin some fine capitals are lying about, which have a close resemblance to those which on other sites have been stated to be remains of synagogues. The shafts of columns lying about generally have the basis or capital worked out of the same piece, have a diameter of 18 inches, and are composed of Nari limestone."

In the same report, it is noted that the water of Bir Husheh, located at the western edge of the ruin, is praised by the locals for its "excellence." Older inhabitants relayed how Jezzar Pasha and Abdullah Pasha, former governors of 'Acca, had their drinking water supplied from the well, and tended to camp by the well during their trips to the interior. Also mentioned in the report is a Greek-language inscription found on a flat stone 508 meters (1,667 ft) to the east of the eastern city wall of the ancient city and 100 meters (330 ft) to the west of a small olive grove, in a rocky region just to the south of a road leading to Shefa 'Amr. The inscription was discovered by natives of Shefa 'Amr who showed it to a priest from Beirut, who in turn shared it with Gottlieb Schumacher of the PEF.

=== British Mandate village ===
In the 1922 census of Palestine conducted by the British Mandate authorities, Husheh had a total population of 165, all Muslims, increasing in the 1931 census to 202, still all Muslims, in a total of 53 houses.

Hawsha was categorized as a hamlet in the Mandate-period Palestine Index Gazetteer. The houses were clustered around the water cistern at the center of the village. The Muslim inhabitants shared a cemetery with Khirbat al-Kasayir. The villagers were agriculturalists and pastoralists who raised livestock. Beans were the most important agricultural product. The agricultural area of the village lay to the southwest. A small area north of the built-up part of the village was planted with olive and fruit trees.

In 1937, Kibbutz Usha was established 2 kilometers (1.2 mi) west of Hawsha.

In the 1945 statistics, Hawsha was counted among Shefa-'Amr's suburbs and was noted with a population of 400 Muslims.

Nabi Hushan shrine
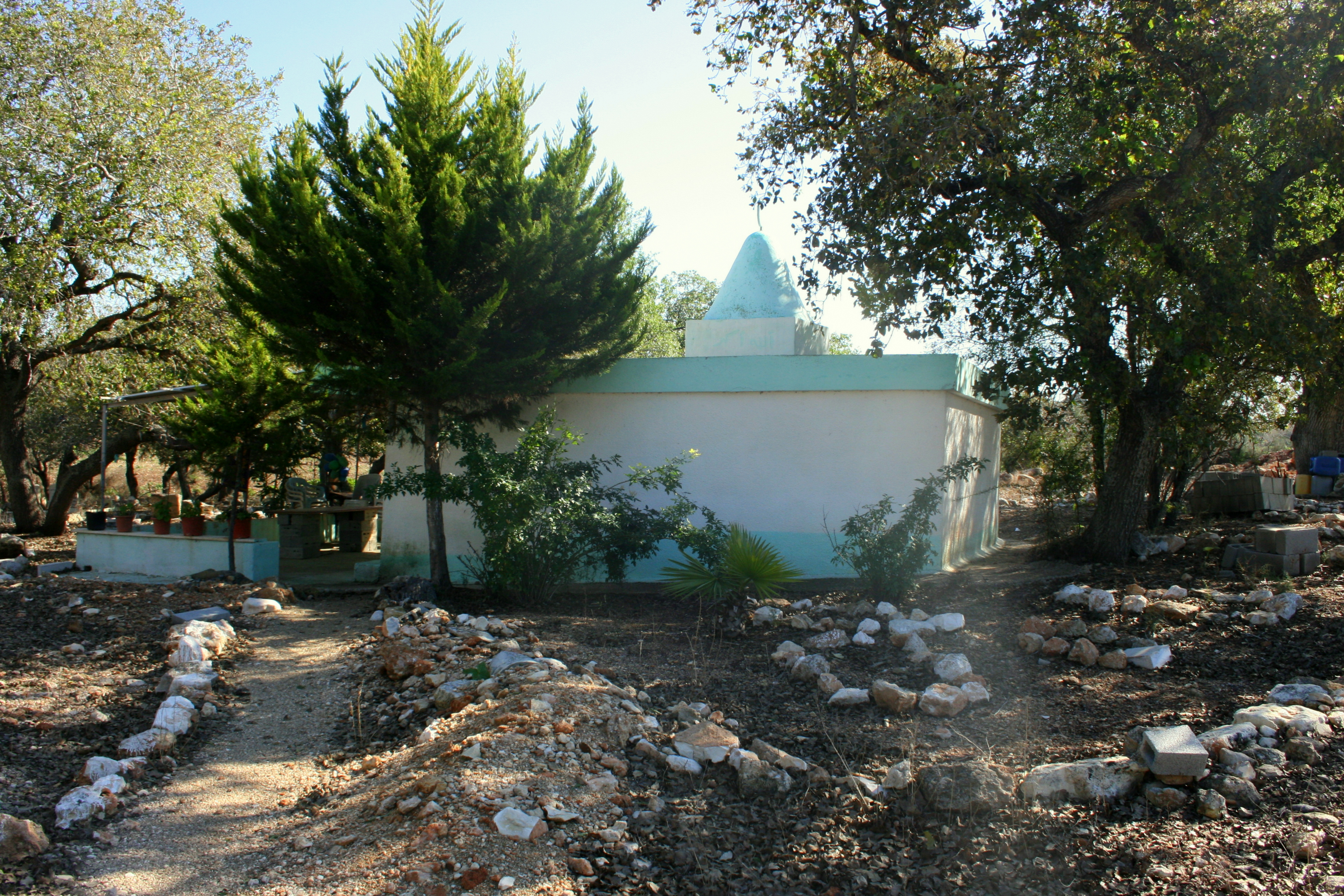
Nabi Hushan shrine in the cemetery that was used by the villagers of Hawsha and al-Kayasir.

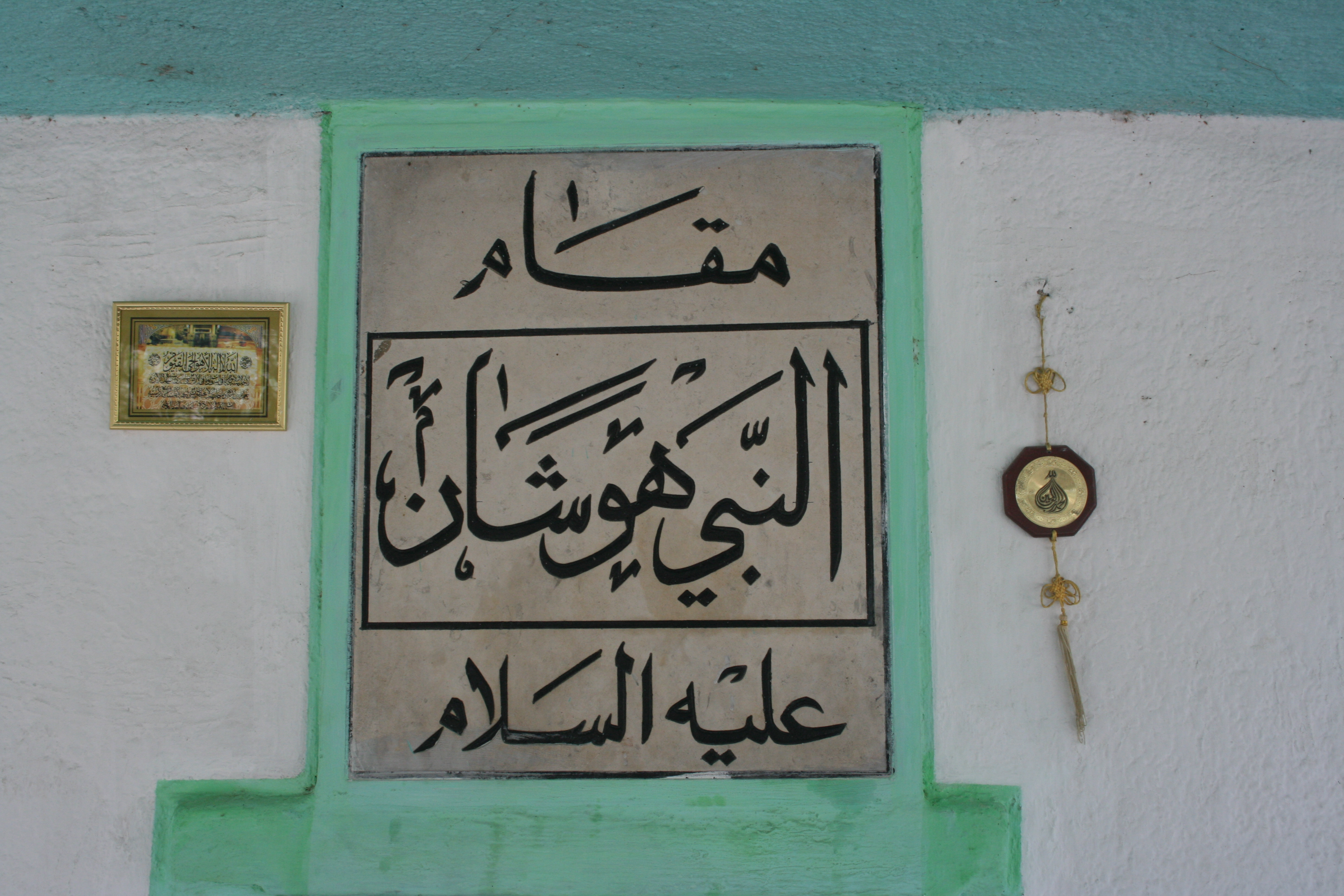
Plaque over the doorway of the entrance to shrine. It reads: "Shrine of the Prophet Hushan, peace be upon him."

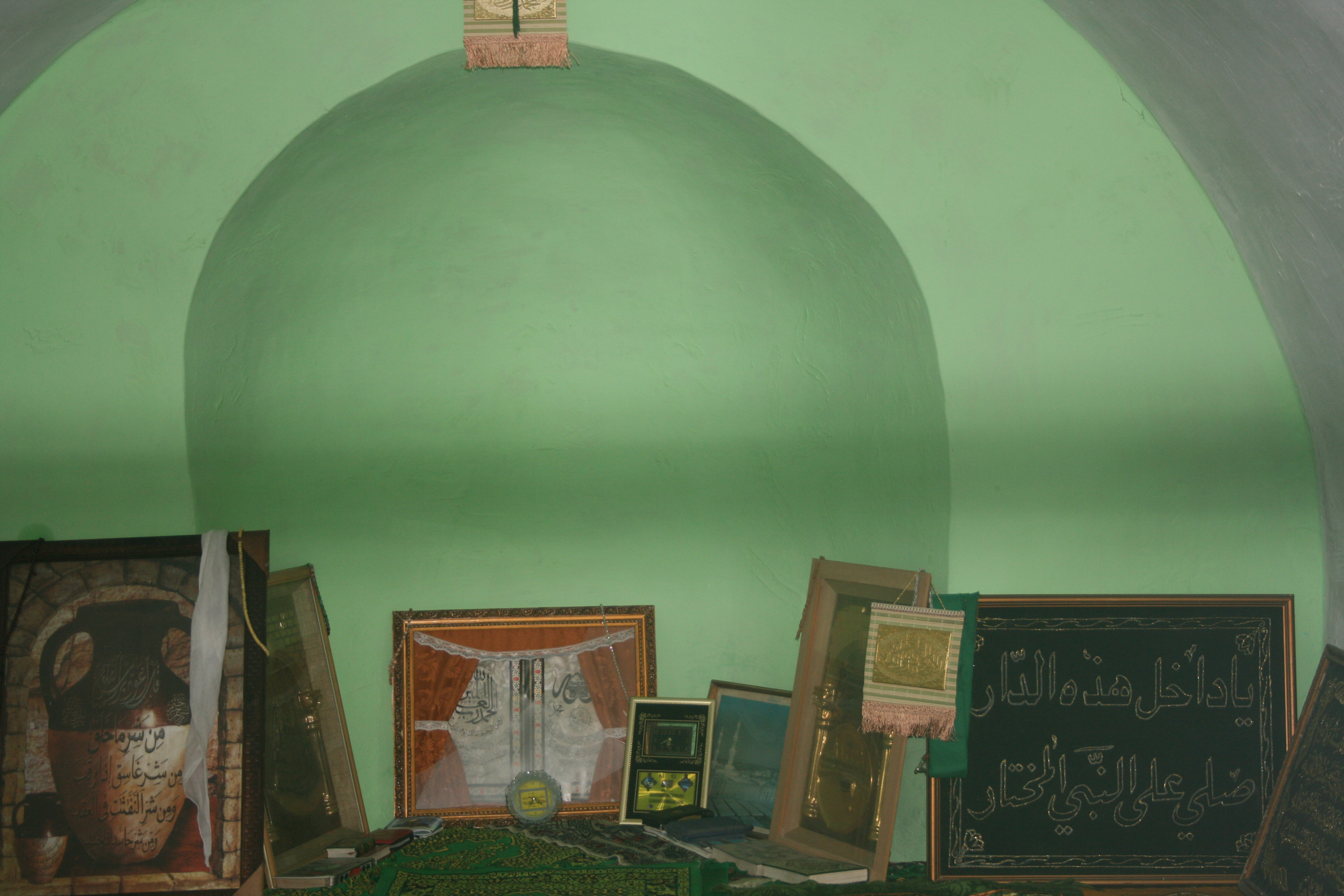
Part of the interior of the Nabi Hushan shrine. The chalkboard message on the right reads: "O ye inside this house [of prayer], pray to the Chosen Prophet [i.e. Muhammad]."

=== 1948 war and aftermath ===
On 11 April 1948, Fawzi al-Qawuqji ordered the ALA's Druze Battalion to begin operations around Kibbutz Ramat Yohanan. The Battalion occupied the semi-abandoned villages of Hawsha and Khirbat al-Kasayir and began to shell Ramat Yohanan and harass the neighboring settlements. The Haganah responded and on the night of 15–16 April, what is known as the Battle of Ramat Yohanan, after the Jewish settlement bloc close to where it was fought, also known by Palestinian historians as the 'Battle of al-Husha and al-Kayasr', after the Palestinian villages that were conquered by the Haganah forces by the battle's end, ensued. According to Morris, "Wailing refugees fled to Shafa-Amr, spreading rumors of Jewish atrocities". According to Benvenisti, the Arab inhabitants who remained in the village following its conquest were evicted in the months following the end of the 1948 Arab-Israeli war, as were the inhabitants of neighboring villages whose lands were coveted for Jewish settlement.

A volunteer effort to restore the cemetery of the depopulated village of Hawsha was undertaken in 1994 and overseen by the Al-Aqsa Association of the Islamic Movement in Israel.

Hawsha-al-Kayasir cemetery
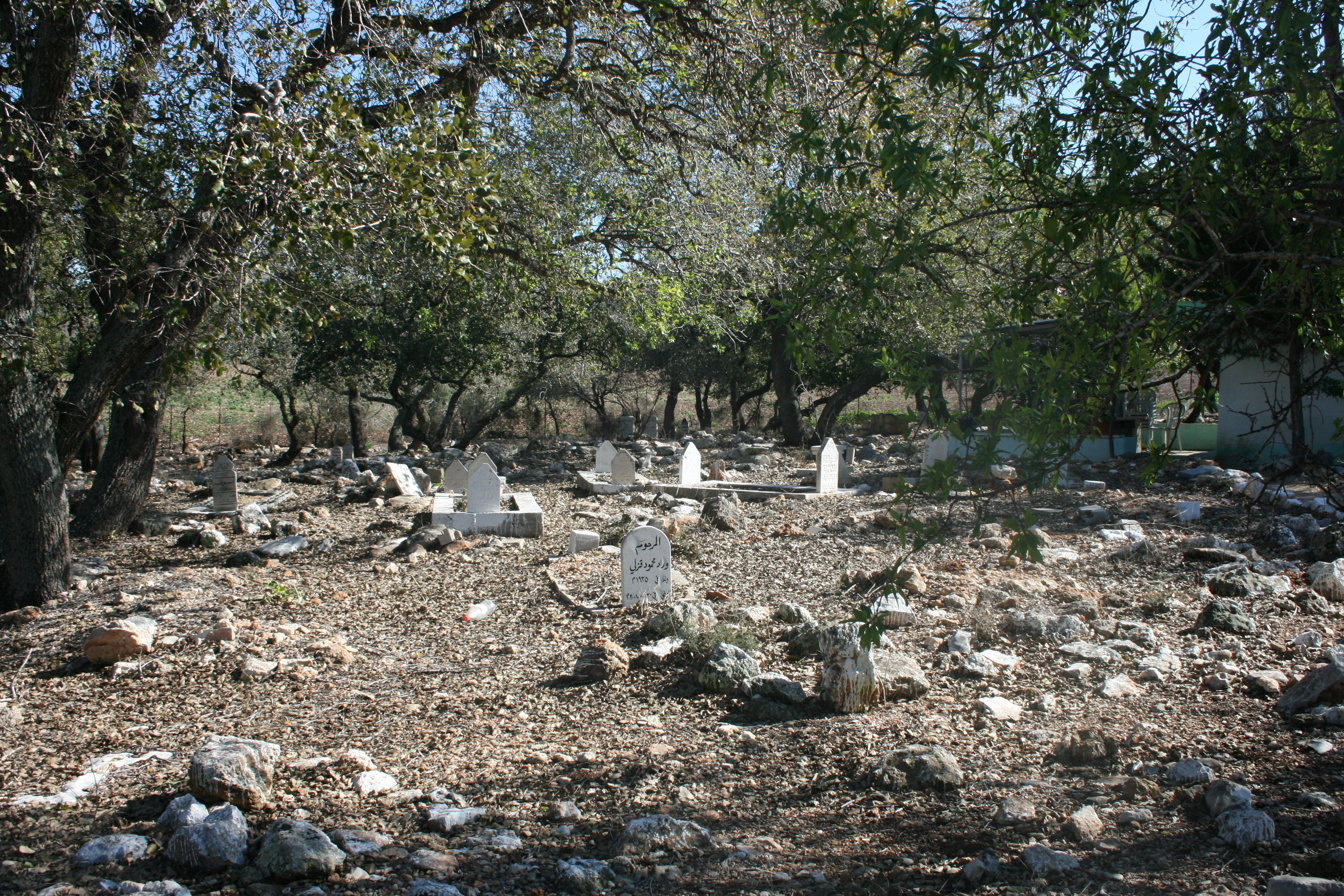
A view of the cemetery shared by the villages of Hawsha and al-Kayasir prior their depopulation.

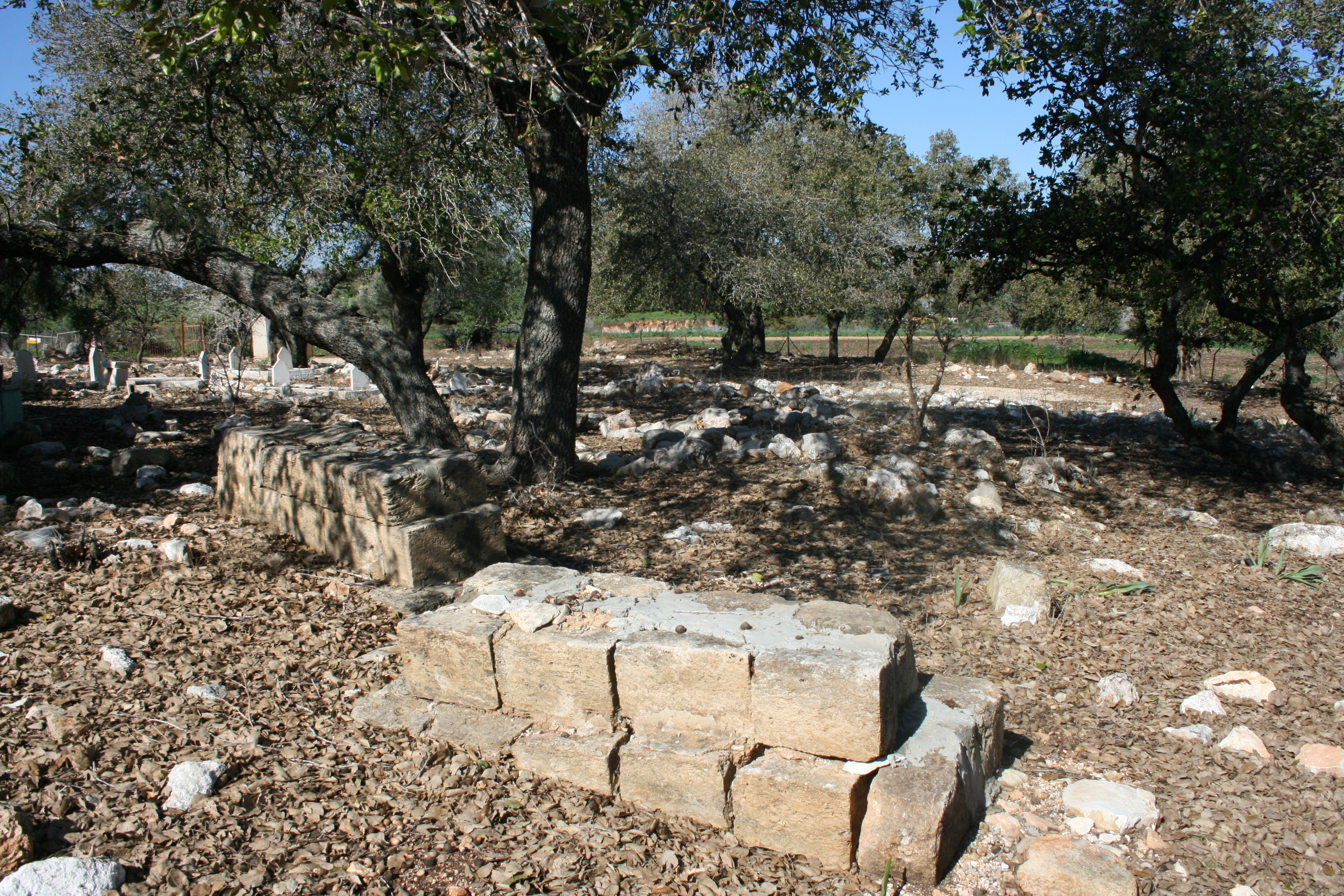
Another view of the cemetery.

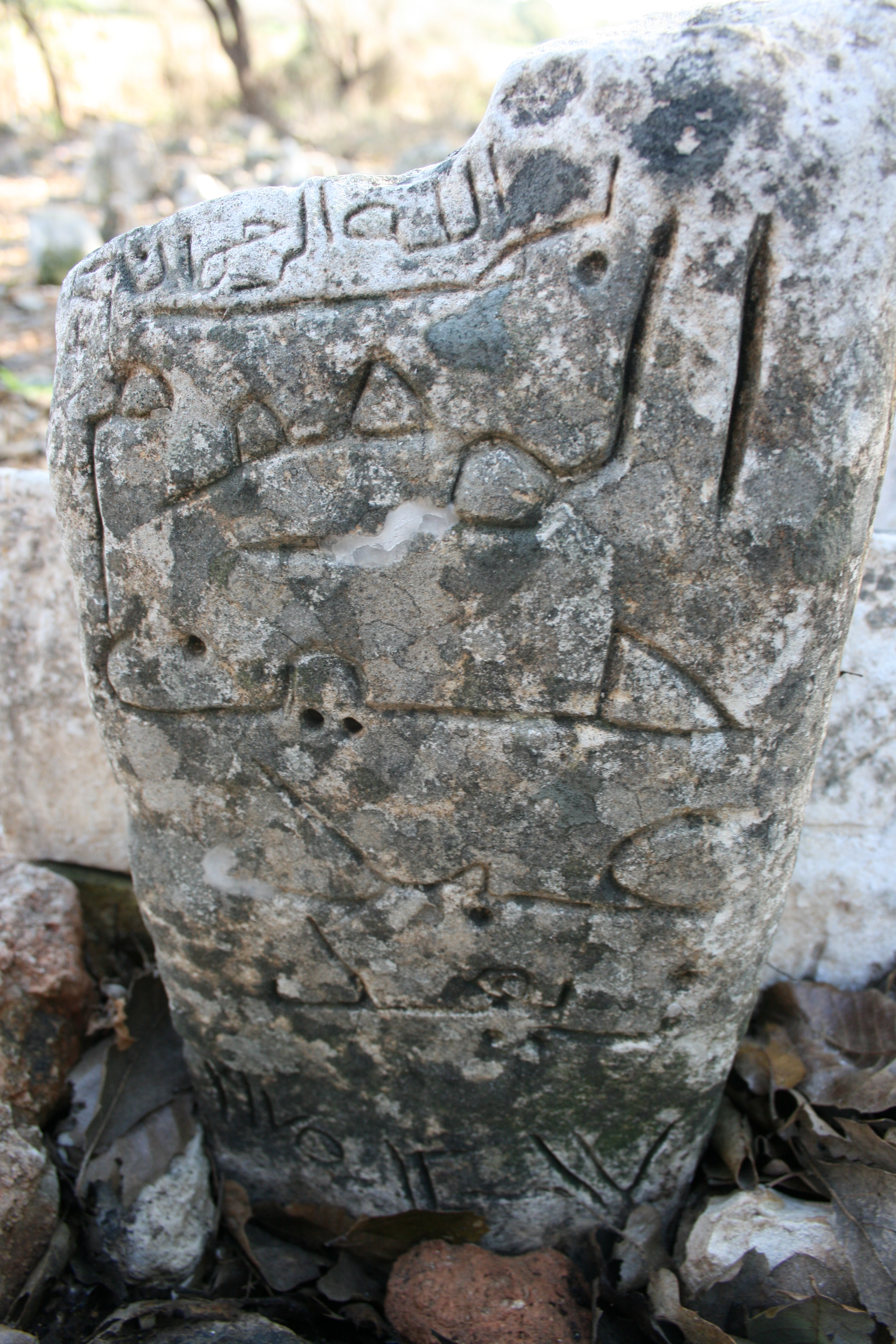
Arabic inscription of a headstone for a grave in the cemetery which reads: "In the name of God, Most Gracious, Most Merciful ... Il-Marhoum ('the mercifully departed') Hussein Abid [last name unclear] 1175 12 17."

== Footnotes ==
| i. | Hoshea or Hosea is used to refer to different biblical characters: Joshua, whose name was changed from Hoshea/Hosea ("salvation") to Joshua ("Yahweh is salvation") by Moses; Hosea, the prophet mentioned in the Book of Hosea; and Hoshea, ruler of the Kingdom of Israel. |

== Bibliography ==
- Barag, Dan (1979). "A new source concerning the ultimate borders of the Latin Kingdom of Jerusalem". Israel Exploration Journal. 29: 197–217.
- Barron, J.B., ed. (1923). Palestine: Report and General Abstracts of the Census of 1922. Government of Palestine.
- Benveniśtî, M. (2002). Sacred landscape: the buried history of the Holy Land since 1948 (Illustrated ed.). University of California Press. ISBN 978-0-520-23422-2.
- Boqa'i, Nihad (2005). N. Masalha (ed.). Catastrophe remembered: Palestine, Israel and the internal refugees : essays in memory of Edward W. Said (1935-2003). Zed Books. ISBN 978-1-84277-623-0.
- Conder, C.R.; Kitchener, H.H. (1881). The Survey of Western Palestine: Memoirs of the Topography, Orography, Hydrography, and Archaeology. Vol. 1. London: Committee of the Palestine Exploration Fund.
- Dauphin, C. (1998). La Palestine byzantine, Peuplement et Populations. BAR International Series 726 (in French). Vol. III : Catalogue. Oxford: Archeopress. ISBN 0-860549-05-4. (p. 671)
- Driver, S.R. (2004). J. Hastings; John Alexander Selbie; A.B. Davidson; H.B. Swete (eds.). A dictionary of the Bible: dealing with its language, literature, and contents, including the Biblical theology, Volume 3, Part 2. The Minerva Group. ISBN 978-1-4102-1727-1.
- Gesenius, W. (1844). A Hebrew and English lexicon of the Old Testament: including the Biblical Chaldee. Edward Robinson. Crocker and Brewster. p. 253.
- Department of Statistics (1945). Village Statistics, April, 1945. Government of Palestine.
- Guérin, V. (1880). Description Géographique Historique et Archéologique de la Palestine (in French). Vol. 3: Galilee, pt. 1. Paris: L'Imprimerie Nationale.
- Hadawi, S. (1970). "Village Statistics of 1945: A Classification of Land and Area ownership in Palestine". Palestine Liberation Organization Research Center.
- Khalidi, W. (1992). All That Remains: The Palestinian Villages Occupied and Depopulated by Israel in 1948. Washington D.C.: Institute for Palestine Studies. ISBN 0-88728-224-5.
- Mills, E., ed. (1932). Census of Palestine 1931. Population of Villages, Towns and Administrative Areas. Jerusalem: Government of Palestine.
- Morris, B. (2004). The Birth of the Palestinian Refugee Problem Revisited. Cambridge University Press. ISBN 978-0-521-00967-6.
- Morris, B. (2008). 1948: A History of the First Arab-Israeli War. Yale University Press. ISBN 978-0-300-12696-9.
- Palestine Exploration Fund (PEF); Stewardson, Henry C. (1838). The survey of western Palestine: A general index to 1. The memoirs, vols. I.-III.; 2. The special papers; 3. The Jerusalem volume; 4. The flora and fauna of Palestine; 5. The geological survey; and to The Arabic and English name lists. Printed for the Committee of the Palestine Exploration Fund by Harrison & sons.
- Palmer, E.H. (1881). The Survey of Western Palestine: Arabic and English Name Lists Collected During the Survey by Lieutenants Conder and Kitchener, R. E. Transliterated and Explained by E.H. Palmer. Committee of the Palestine Exploration Fund.
- Parsons, Laila (1998). Ronald L. Nettler; S. Taji-Farouki (eds.). Muslim-Jewish encounters: intellectual traditions and modern politics. Taylor & Francis. ISBN 90-5702-196-X.
- Petersen, Andrew (2002). A Gazetteer of Buildings in Muslim Palestine (British Academy Monographs in Archaeology). Vol. I. Oxford University Press. p. 151. ISBN 978-0-19-727011-0. Archived from the original on 2021-05-29.
- Schumacher, G. (1890). "Notes from Galilee". Quarterly Statement - Palestine Exploration Fund. 22: 24–25.
- Thomson, W.M. (1859). The Land and the Book: Or, Biblical Illustrations Drawn from the Manners and Customs, the Scenes and Scenery, of the Holy Land. Vol. 1 (1 ed.). New York: Harper & brothers.
- Zunz, L. (1841). "On the geography of Palestine from Jewish sources". In Adolf Asher (ed.), The itinerary of Rabbi Benjamin of Tudela, Volume 2. Berlin: Julius Sittenfeld printing house. p. 428. ISBN 1-152-34804-3. Access date 29 January 2024.
- Walvoord, J.F.; R.B. Zuck, eds. (1983). The Bible Knowledge Commentary: Old Testament. David C. Cook, 1985. ISBN 9780882078137.
