= Nakba Day =

Palestinian commemoration of 1948 displacement

- Significance: Nakba
- Date: 15 May
- Next time: 15 May 2027
- Frequency: Annual
- Related to: Yom Ha'atzmaut

Nakba Day (Arabic: ذكرى النكبة, romanized: Ḏikrā an-Nakba, lit. 'Memory of the Catastrophe') is the day of commemoration for the Nakba, also known as the Palestinian Catastrophe, when the Palestinian homeland and society were destroyed in 1948 and most Palestinians were permanently displaced. It is generally commemorated on 15 May, the day after the Gregorian calendar date of the Israeli Declaration of Independence on 14 May 1948.

The day was officially inaugurated by Yasser Arafat in 1998, though the date had been unofficially used for protests since as early as 1949.

== Timing ==
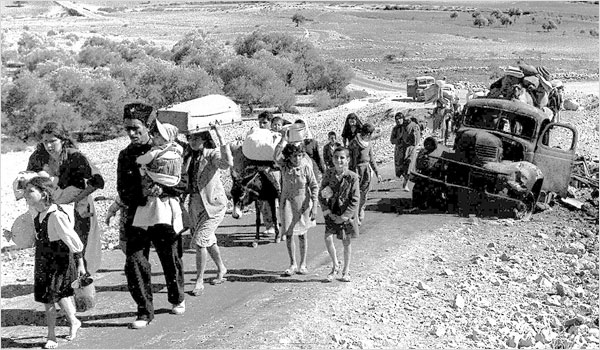
Palestinian refugees in 1948

Nakba Day is generally commemorated on 15 May, the day after the Gregorian calendar date for Israel's Independence. In Israel, some Arab citizens have held Nakba Day events on Yom Ha'atzmaut (Israel's Independence Day), which is celebrated in Israel on the Hebrew calendar date (5 Iyar or shortly before or after). Because of the differences between the Hebrew and the Gregorian calendars, Independence Day and 15 May only coincide every 19 years.

== Commemoration ==
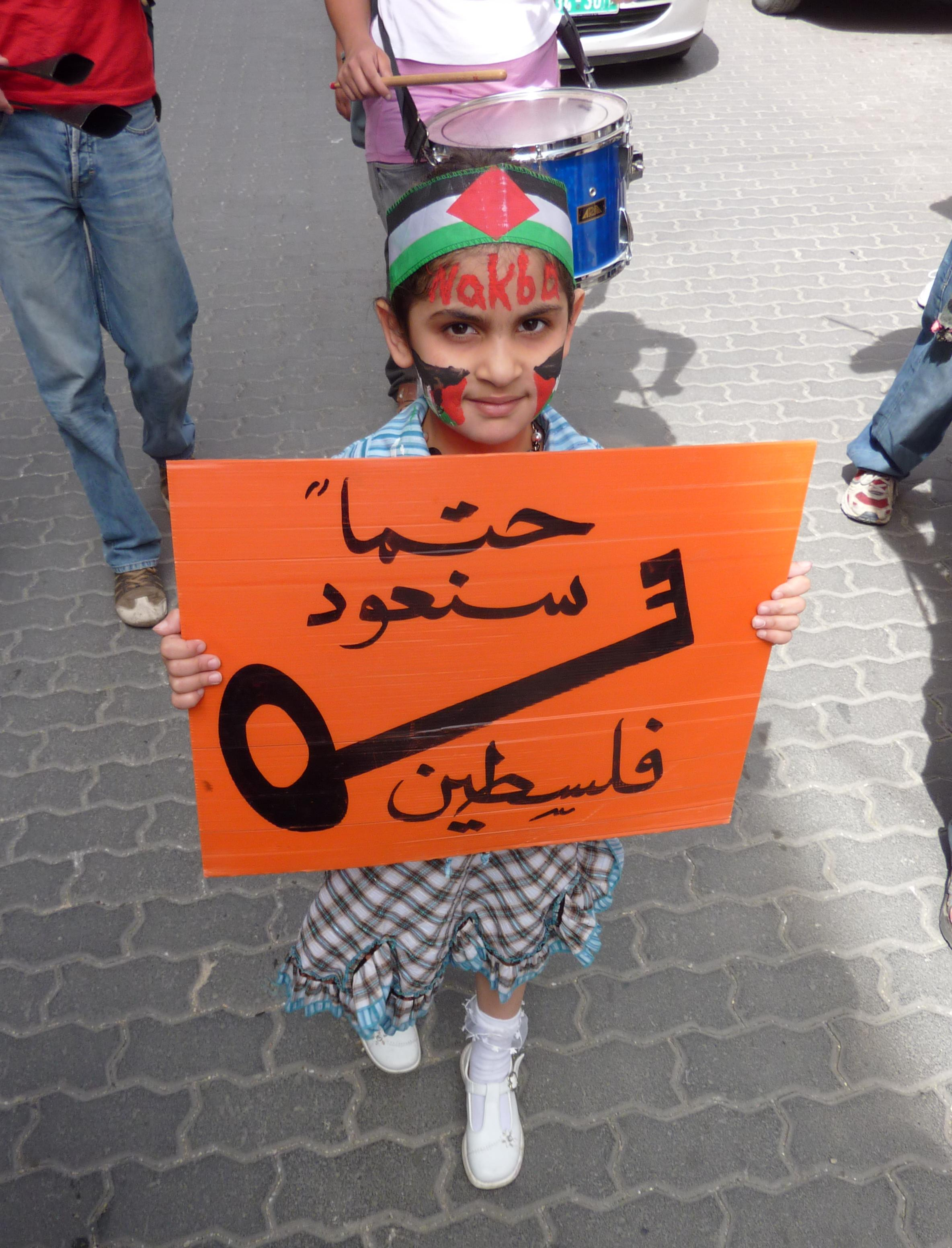
Palestinian girl in a protest on Nakba Day 2010 in Hebron, West Bank. Her sign says "Surely we will return, Palestine." Most of the Palestinian refugees in the West Bank are descendants of people whose families hail from areas that were incorporated into Israel in 1948. The key is a symbol of the houses which Palestinians left as part of the Nakba.

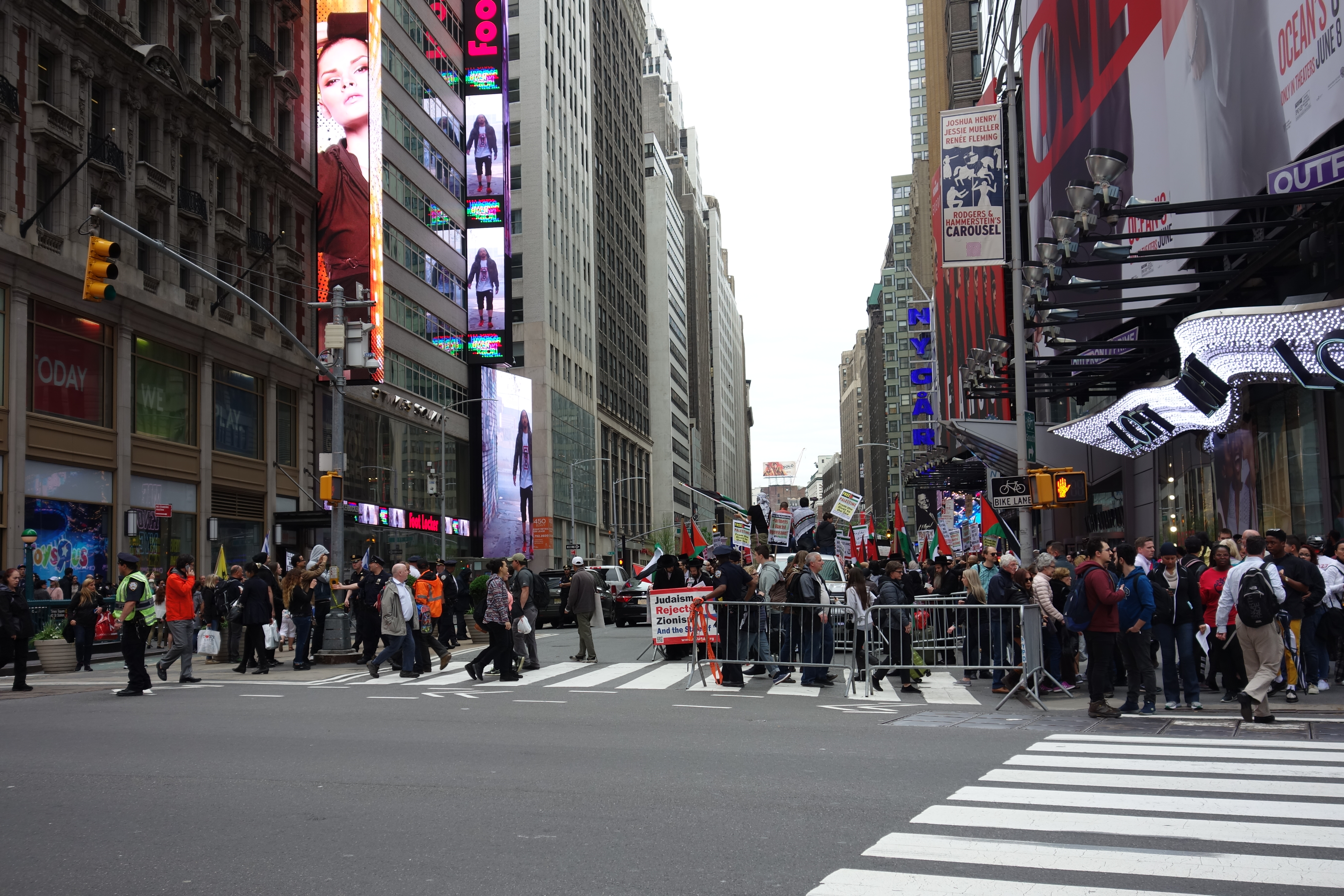
A demonstration for Nakba Day on Broadway at 42nd Street in Times Square, Midtown Manhattan.

As early as 1949, the year after the establishment of the State of Israel, 15 May was marked in several West Bank cities (under Jordanian rule) by demonstrations, strikes, the raising of black flags, and visits to the graves of people killed during the 1948 war. These events were organized by worker and student associations, cultural and sports clubs, scouts clubs, committees of refugees, and the Muslim Brotherhood. Speakers at these gatherings blamed Arab governments and the Arab League for failing to "save Palestine", according to author Tamir Sorek. By the late 1950s, 15 May was known in the Arab world as Palestine Day, mentioned by the media in Arab and Muslim countries as a day of international solidarity with Palestine.

=== March of Return ===
Commemoration of the Nakba by Arab citizens of Israel who are internally displaced persons as a result of the 1948 war has been practiced for decades, but until the early 1990s was relatively weak. Initially, the memory of the catastrophe of 1948 was personal and communal in character and families or members of a given village used the day to gather at the site of their former villages. Small-scale commemorations of the tenth anniversary in the form of silent vigils were held by Arab students at a few schools in Israel in 1958, despite attempts by the Israeli authorities to thwart them. Visits to the sites of former villages became increasingly visible after the events of Land Day in 1976. In the wake of the failure of the 1991 Madrid Conference to broach the subject of refugees, the Association for the Defense of the Rights of the Internally Displaced was founded to organize a March of Return to the site of a different village every year on 15 May to place the issue on the Israeli public agenda.

By the early 1990s, annual commemorations of the day by Palestinian Arab citizens of Israel held a prominent place in the community's public discourse.

=== Other commemorations ===
Meron Benvenisti writes that it was "Israeli Arabs who taught the residents of the territories to commemorate Nakba Day." Palestinians in the occupied territories were called upon to commemorate 15 May as a day of national mourning by the Palestine Liberation Organization's United National Command of the Uprising during the First Intifada in 1988. The day was inaugurated by Yasser Arafat in 1998.

The event is often marked by speeches and rallies by Palestinians in Israel, the West Bank and Gaza, in Palestinian refugee camps in Arab states, and in other places around the world. Sometimes clashes develop between Palestinians and the Israel Defense Forces in the West Bank and Gaza Strip. In 2003 and 2004, there were demonstrations in London and New York City. In 2002, Zochrot was established to organize events raising the awareness of the Nakba in Hebrew so as to bring Palestinians and Israelis closer to reconciliation. The name is the Hebrew feminine plural form of "remember".

On Nakba Day 2011, Palestinians and other Arabs from the West Bank, Gaza Strip, Lebanon, and Syria marched toward their respective borders, or ceasefire lines and checkpoints in Israeli-occupied territories, to mark the event. At least twelve Palestinians and supporters were killed and hundreds wounded as a result of shootings by the Israeli Army. The Israeli army opened fire after thousands of Syrian protesters tried to forcibly enter the Israeli-occupied Golan Heights, resulting in what AFP called one of the worst incidents of violence there since the 1974 truce accord. The IDF said troops "fired selectively" at "hundreds of Syrian rioters", injuring some. According to the BBC, the 2011 Nakba Day demonstrations were given impetus by the Arab Spring. During the 2012 commemoration, thousands of Palestinian demonstrators protested in cities and towns across the West Bank and Gaza Strip. Protesters threw stones at Israeli soldiers guarding checkpoints in East Jerusalem, who fired rubber bullets and tear gas in response. In 2021, Nakba Day occurred during the 2021 Israel–Palestine crisis and at least 29 Palestinians were injured by Israeli security forces in the West Bank, according to Al Jazeera English.

== Objections to commemoration ==
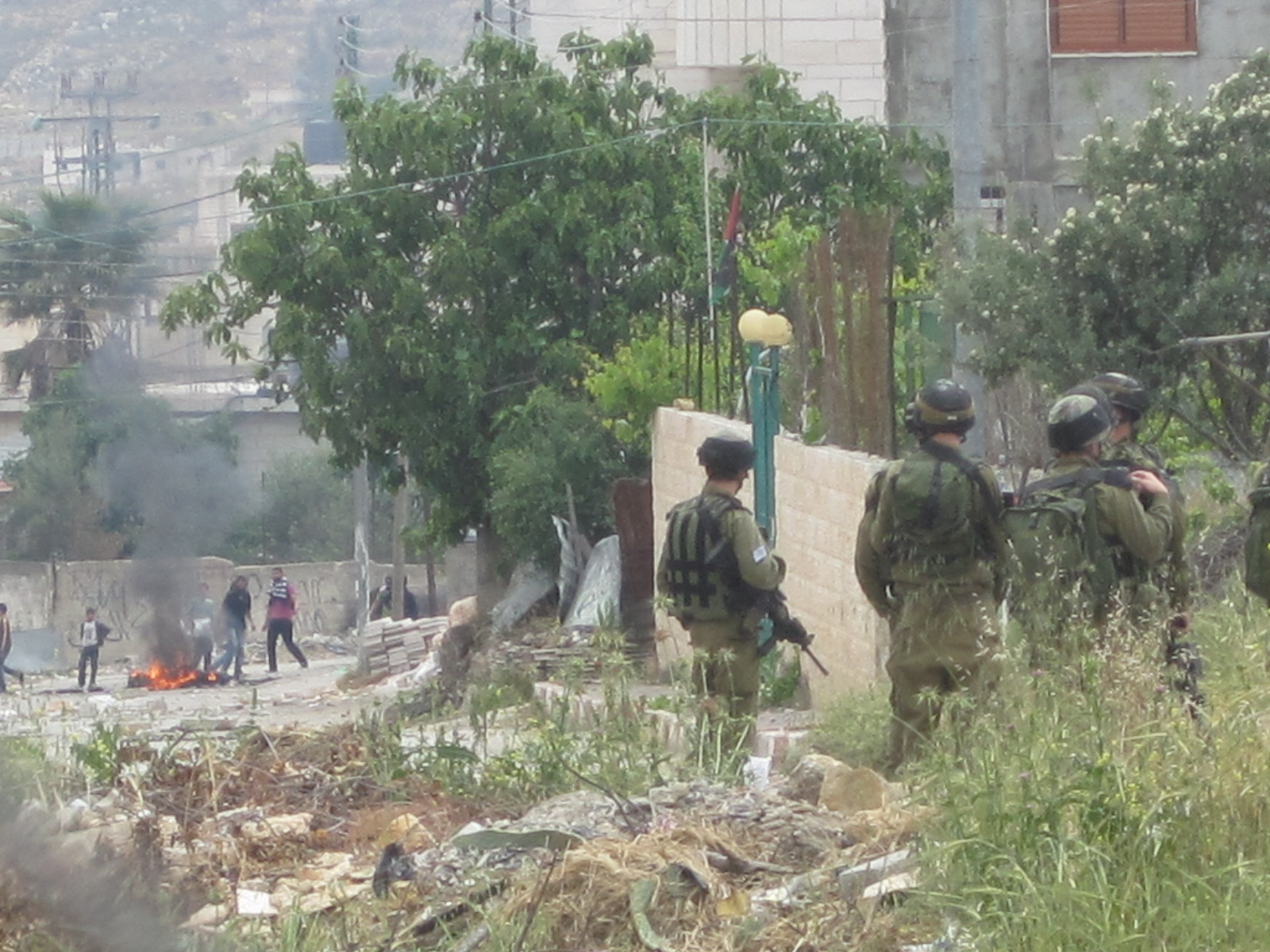
Nakba Day 2011 in Arroub camp in Hebron, Palestine.

Shlomo Avineri has criticized observance of Nakba Day on the grounds that a more important issue is the failure to solidify a stronger national movement for Palestinian citizens as a foundation for nation-building. Arab citizens of Israel have also been admonished for observing Nakba Day in light of their higher standard of living than that of Palestinians who reside outside of Israel.

On 23 March 2011, the Knesset approved, by a vote of 37 to 25, a change to the budget, giving the Israeli finance minister the discretion to reduce government funding to any non-governmental organization (NGO) that commemorates the Palestinian Nakba instead of the Israeli Day of Independence. A previous form of the bill, which came under consideration by the Knesset in 2001 and again in 2006, made commemoration of Nakba Day a criminal offense, subject to 1-year imprisonment and/or a fine of NIS10,000 (~$2,500). Palestinians argue that the bill imposes restrictions on freedom of speech and expression, curtails equality, and suppresses their national consciousness and historical narrative.

On 5 January 2012, after months of legislative limbo due to appeals by organizations such as Adalah and the Association for Civil Rights in Israel, as well as several Jewish and Arab citizens of Israel, the Supreme Court of Israel rejected the appeals and upheld the Nakba Law. Chief Justice Dorit Beinisch and Justices Eliezer Rivlin and Miriam Naor concluded: "The declarative level of the law does indeed raise difficult and complex questions. However, from the outset, the constitutionality of the law depends largely upon the interpretation given to the law's directives." Deductions could equal up to three times the event's sponsorship cost; repeat violations would double the amount of the fine.

== See also ==
- Al-Quds Day
- Day to Mark the Departure and Expulsion of Jews from the Arab Countries and Iran
- Farha (film)
- International Day of Solidarity with the Palestinian People
- Naksa Day
- Ongoing Nakba
