= Khirbat Al-Dumun =

Al-Dumun خربة الدامون Khirbet al Damun
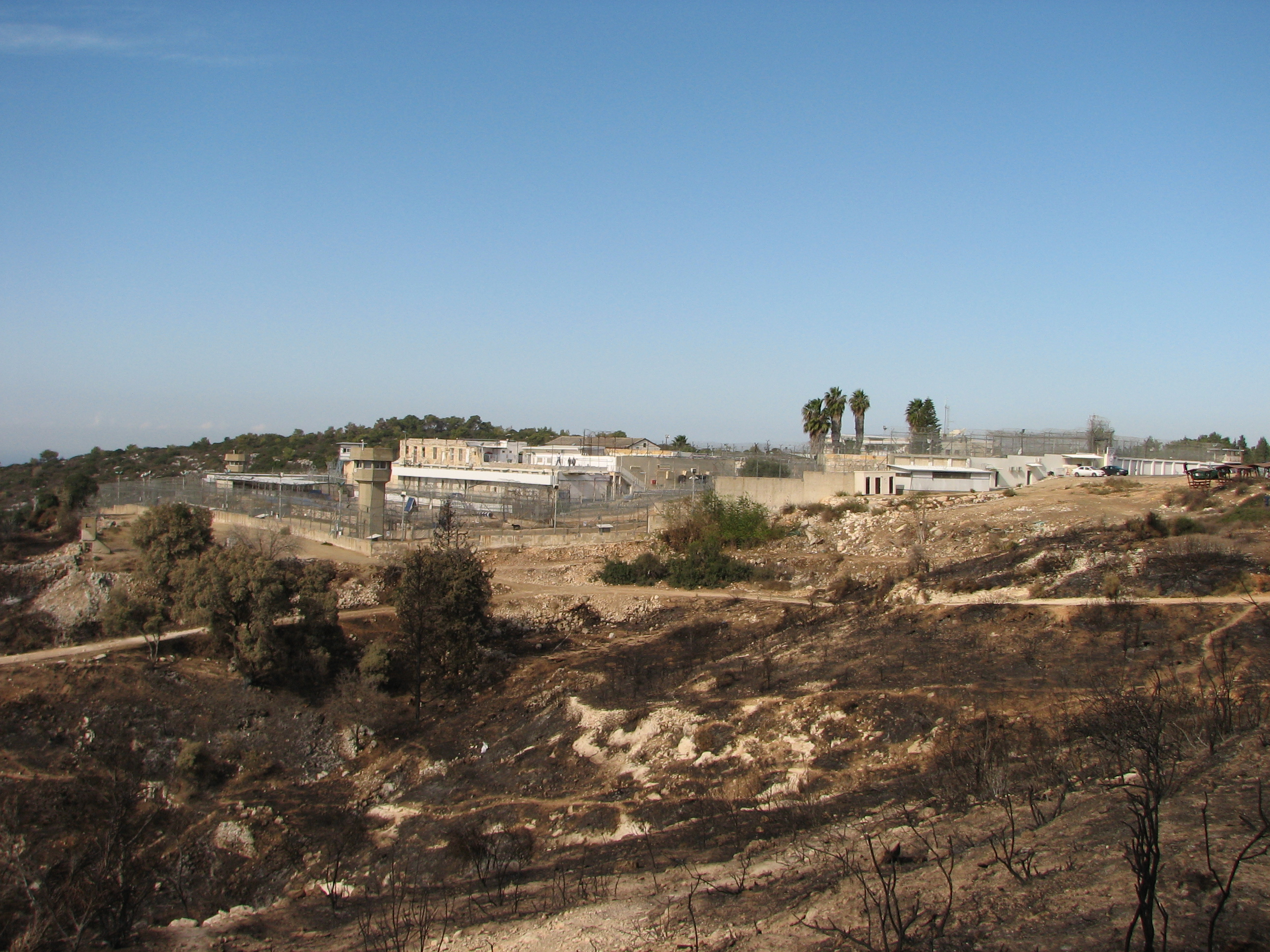
- Damon prison, 2010
- Etymology: Duweimîn, the little dôm trees, a kind of Zizyphus
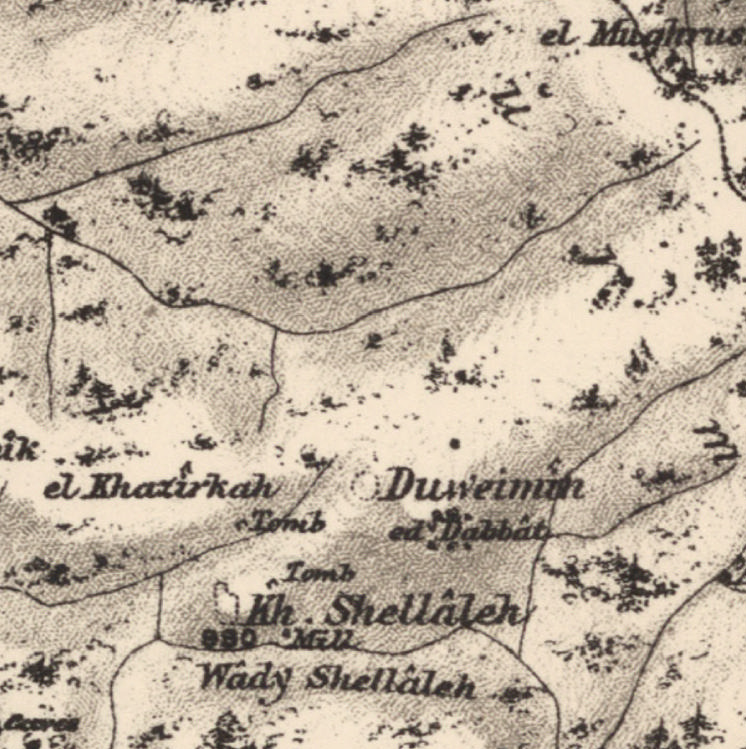
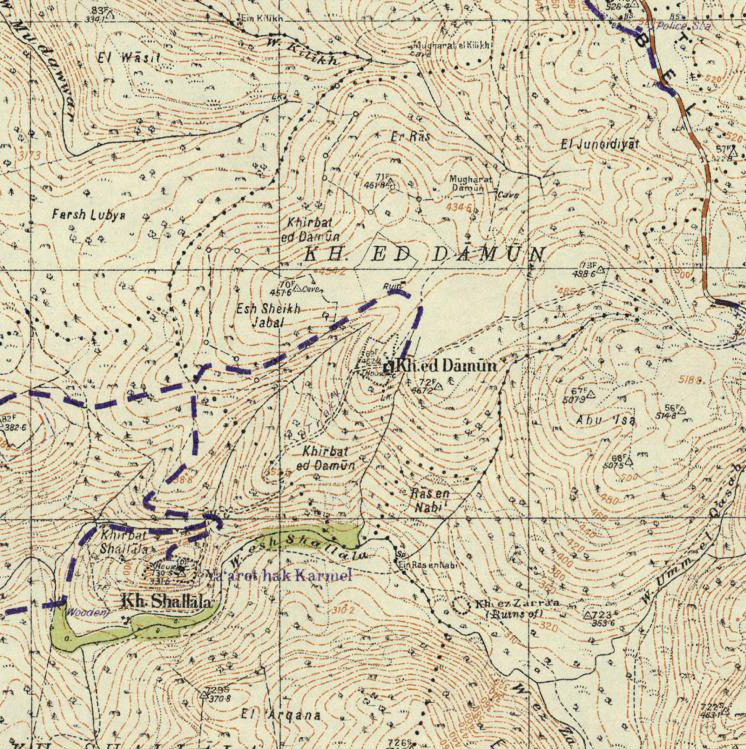
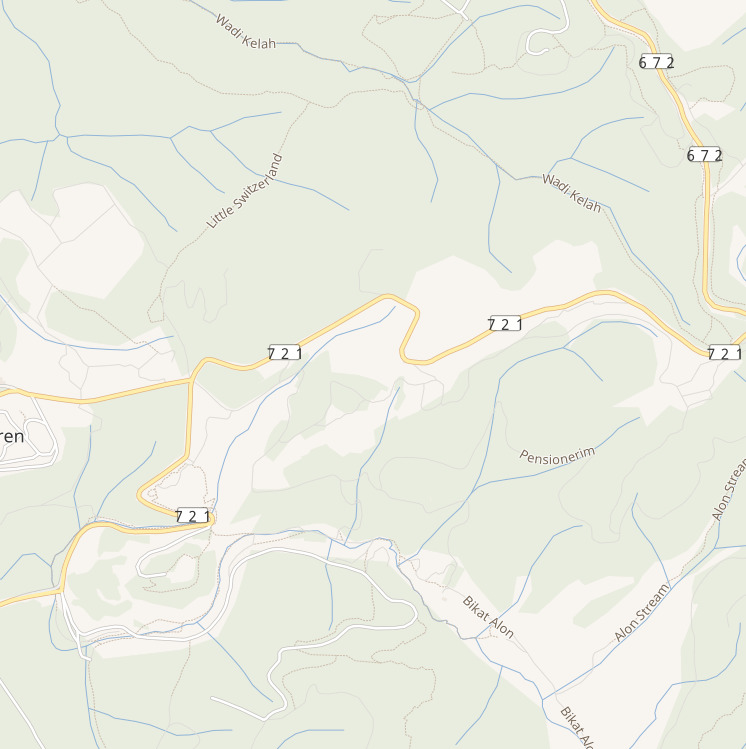
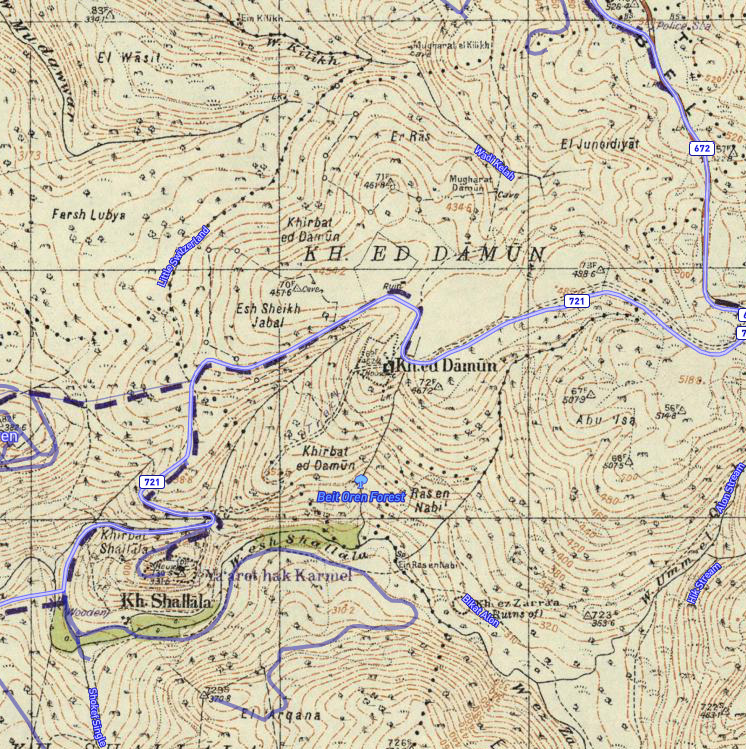
- 1870s map 1940s map modern map 1940s with modern overlay map A series of historical maps of the area around Khirbat Al-Dumun (click the buttons)

- Location within Mandatory Palestine
- Coordinates: 32°43′58″N 35°01′20″E
- Palestine grid: 152/237
- Geopolitical entity: Mandatory Palestine
- Subdistrict: Haifa
- Date of depopulation: April 30, 1948

Area
  - Total: 2,797 dunams (2.797 km^{2}; 1.080 sq mi)

Population (1945)
  - Total: 340
- Cause(s) of depopulation: Fear of being caught up in the fighting
- Secondary cause: Military assault by Yishuv forces

Al-Dumun (Arabic: الدامون) was a Palestinian Arab village in the Haifa Subdistrict. It was depopulated during the 1947–1948 Civil War in Mandatory Palestine on April 30, 1948. It was located 10.5 km southeast of Haifa.

== History ==
A known cave located in the area was used as a sheep fold. Flints artefacts from the cave had been dated to the Neolithic period.

In 1881 the PEF's Survey of Western Palestine noted at Duweimin “foundations."

=== British Mandate era ===
In the 1922 census of Palestine conducted by the British Mandate authorities, Al Damun had a population of 19 Muslims, while in the 1931 census, it was counted under Isfiya.

In the 1945 statistics the village had a population of 340 Muslims, and the total land area was 2,797 dunams. Of this, 5 dunams were used for citrus and bananas, 280 were for plantations and irrigable land, 1,619 for cereals, while 893 dunams were non-cultivable land.

=== 1948, aftermath ===
At the end of April, 1948, the villagers surrendered without a fight, and the village was garrisoned by the Haganah. The villagers were, at first, allowed to stay. Morris notes that part of the document stating this has been blacked out by the IDF censors, presumably, according to Morris, as the writer have suggested that the villagers were to be expelled.

In 1992, the remains were described: "All that remains from the village is a building now used as a prison. Cactuses and few remaining fruit trees, such as pomegranate and almond trees, grown on the site. The land is forested and the area is currently used by Israelis for recreation."

== Damon prison ==
The original building of Damon prison was built to be a tobacco factory and stable during the British Mandate for Palestine. The building was constructed to retain humidity to preserve tobacco leaves. Following additional construction around the site, it was opened as a detention center in 1953 by the Israeli Minister of Police.

In 2000, Israel Prison Service closed the prison temporarily due to inhumane conditions. It reopened in 2001 for incarcerating immigrant workers and Palestinians without official permits. There is no evidence that the complex has had significant changes or improvements since the 1950s.

The prison has a section for Palestinian children, and a wing dedicated to detaining females was established in 2018.

According to the Palestinian Prisoner Society and the Palestinian Prisoners’ Affairs Commission, approximately 90 Palestinian women are currently held in Damon Prison, including pregnant detainees, minors, and individuals with serious medical conditions, including cancer patients. The group reports that some detainees are held under administrative detention without charge.

Reports state that the detainees face harsh conditions, including hunger, abuse, medical neglect, and limited access to healthcare. They are also reported to be subjected to strip searches, solitary confinement, and physical and psychological mistreatment, including assault and intimidation. The reports further state that detainees experience deprivation of food and basic necessities, as well as restrictions on communication and movement within the prison system.

== Bibliography ==
- Barron, J.B., ed. (1923). Palestine: Report and General Abstracts of the Census of 1922. Government of Palestine.
- Government of Palestine, Department of Statistics (1945). Village Statistics, April, 1945.
- Hadawi, S. (1970). Village Statistics of 1945: A Classification of Land and Area ownership in Palestine. Palestine Liberation Organization Research Center.
- Khalidi, W. (1992). All That Remains: The Palestinian Villages Occupied and Depopulated by Israel in 1948. Washington D.C.: Institute for Palestine Studies. ISBN 0-88728-224-5.
- Mills, E., ed. (1932). Census of Palestine 1931. Population of Villages, Towns and Administrative Areas. Jerusalem: Government of Palestine.
- Morris, B. (2004). The Birth of the Palestinian Refugee Problem Revisited. Cambridge University Press. ISBN 978-0-521-00967-6.
- Palmer, E.H. (1881). The Survey of Western Palestine: Arabic and English Name Lists Collected During the Survey by Lieutenants Conder and Kitchener, R. E. Transliterated and Explained by E.H. Palmer. Committee of the Palestine Exploration Fund.
