= Khubbayza =

Khubbayza خبْيزة Khubbeiza
- Village
- Etymology: "March Mallow"
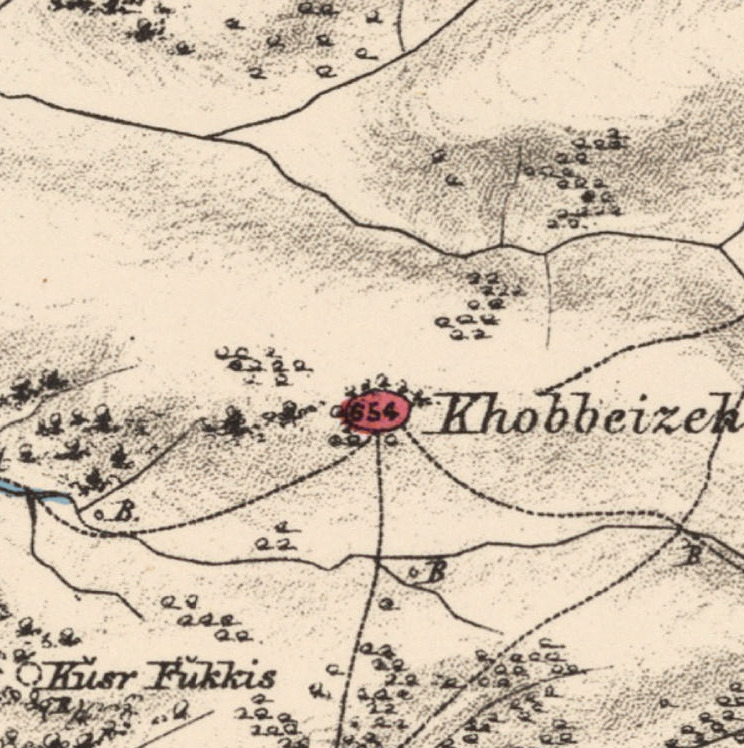
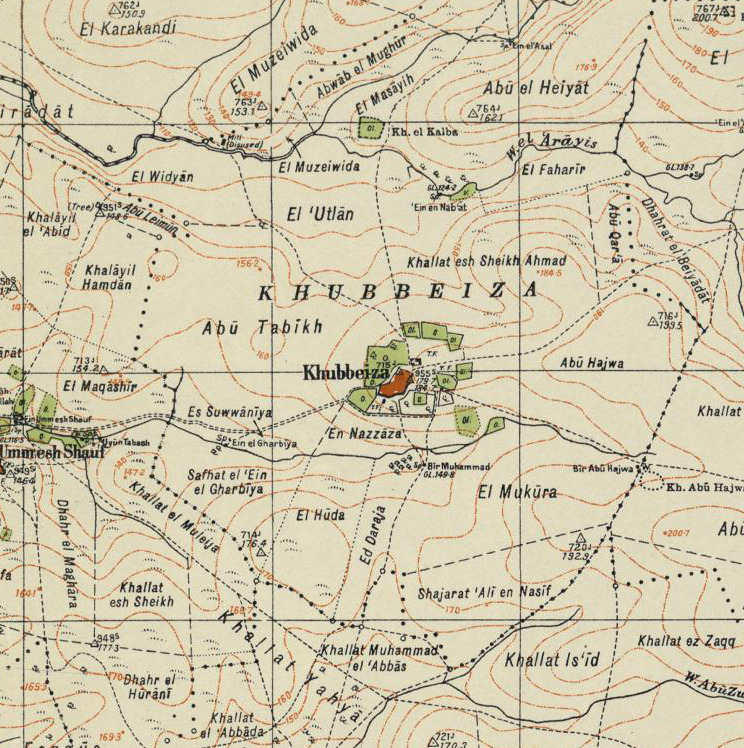
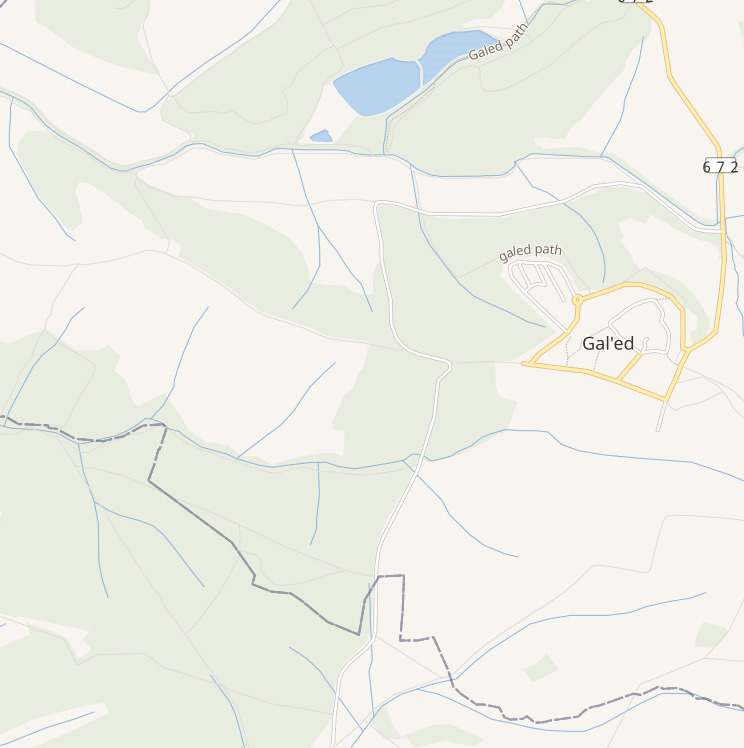
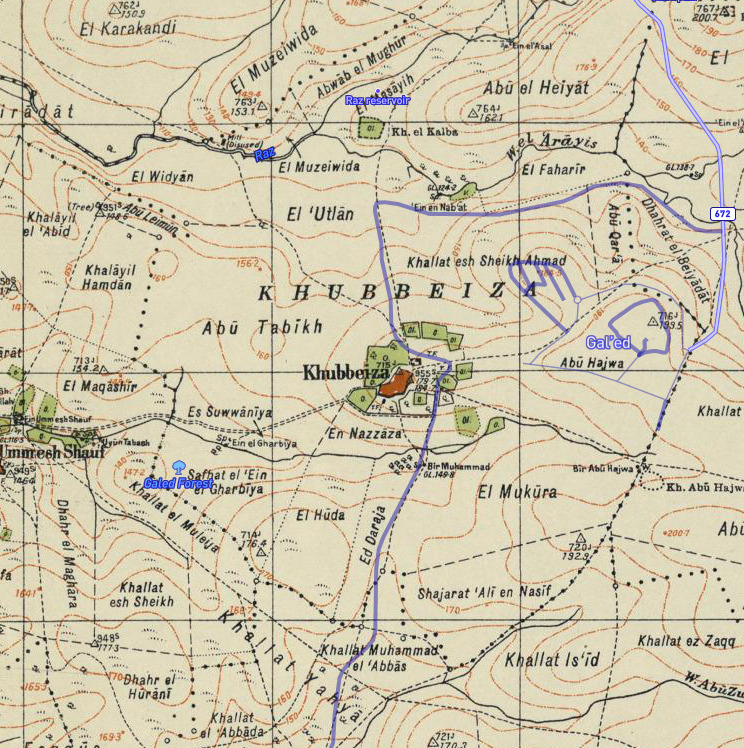
- 1870s map 1940s map modern map 1940s with modern overlay map A series of historical maps of the area around Khubbayza (click the buttons)

- Location within Mandatory Palestine
- Coordinates: 32°33′22″N 35°03′56″E
- Palestine grid: 156/218
- Geopolitical entity: Mandatory Palestine
- Subdistrict: Haifa
- Date of depopulation: 12–14 May 1948

Area
  - Total: 4,854 dunams (4.854 km^{2}; 1.874 sq mi)

Population (1945)
  - Total: 290
- Cause(s) of depopulation: Military assault by Yishuv forces
- Current Localities: None

Khubbayza (Arabic: خبْيزة) was a Palestinian Arab village in the Haifa Subdistrict, located 29.5 kilometers (18.3 mi) southeast of Haifa. It was situated on hilly terrain, south of Wadi al-Sindiyana, between the Jezreel Valley with the Mediterranean coast. In 1945, it had a population of 290. Khubbayza was depopulated during the 1948 War on May 12, 1948, in the Battle of Mishmar HaEmek.

== History ==
The village is named after the Arabic term for mallow, a wild plant used in Palestinian cuisine, particularly in rural areas. To the north of Khubbayza laid the ruins of Khirbat Kalba, named after Banu Kalb, the Arab tribe. It contained traces of human settlement.

In 1859, Khubbayza had an estimated 270 inhabitants who cultivated 24 feddans of land, while Victor Guérin, who visited in 1870, found the village to have 400 inhabitant.

In 1882 the PEF's Survey of Western Palestine described Khobbeizeh as a "village of moderate size on high ground, with wells in the valley to the south".

A population list from about 1887 showed that el Khobbeizeh had about 315 inhabitants, all Muslim.

=== British Mandate era ===
In the 1922 census of Palestine conducted by the British Mandate authorities, Khubaizeh had a population 140, all Muslims, increasing in the 1931 census to 209, still all Muslims, in a total of 42 houses.

In this period, it was oriented along a northwest axis and its houses, constructed of stone, were clustered together. The villagers earned their living in agriculture, mostly cultivating grains and vegetables, but also worked in animal husbandry. Domestic water was obtained from numerous springs and wells within Khubbayza's boundaries.

In the 1945 statistics, it had a population of 290 Muslim inhabitants, and the total land area was 4,854 dunams. Of the land, Arabs used 65 dunams for plantations and irrigable land, 2,295 for cereals, while 11 dunams were built-up (urban) land.

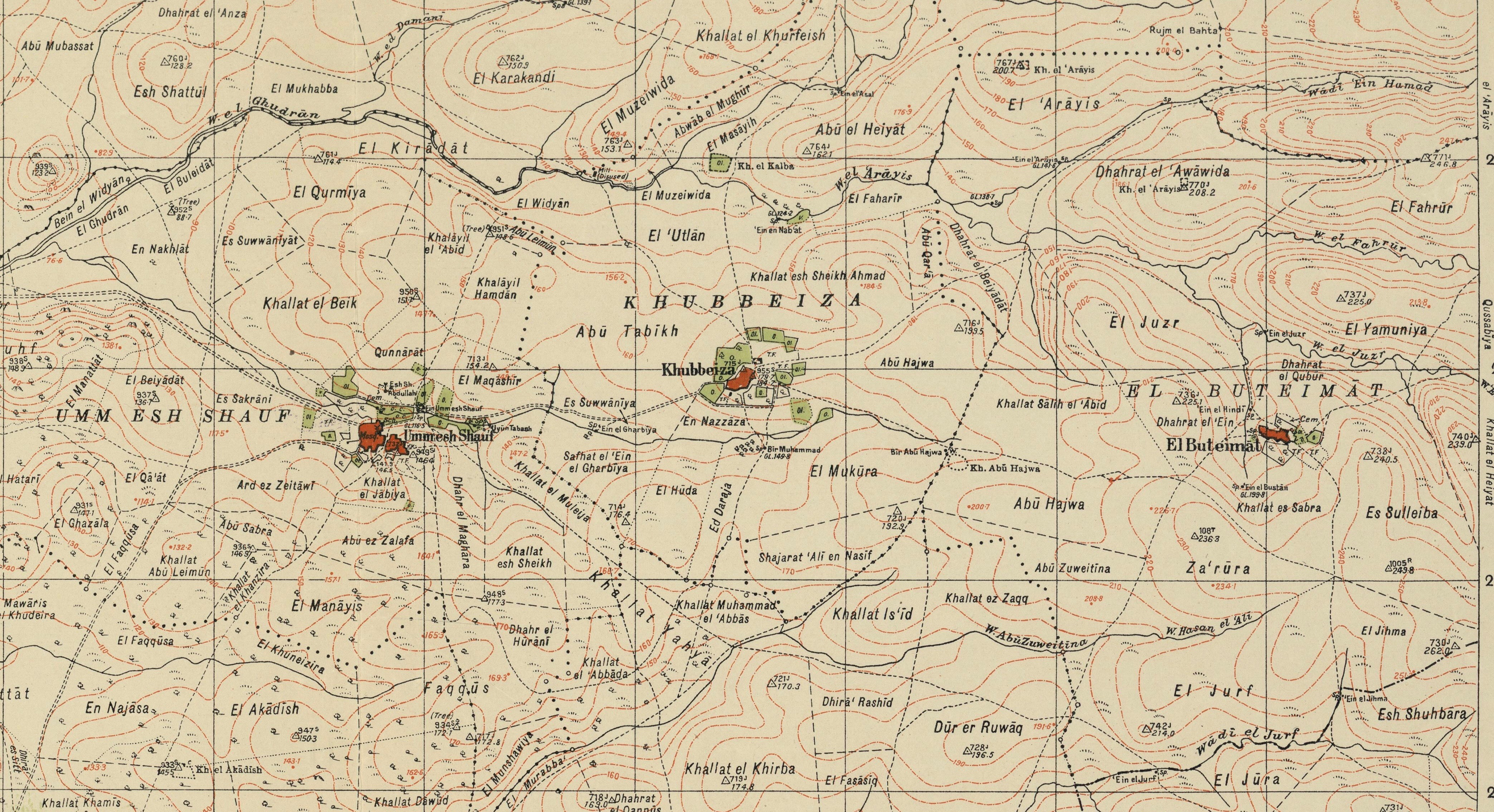
Khubbayza 1942 1:20,000

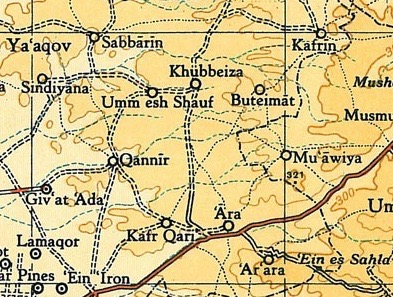
Khubbayza 1945 1:250,000

=== 1948 and aftermath ===
Israel's pre-military force, the Haganah, launched a raid against the village on January 1, 1948, but no casualties were reported. It was not captured until several months later, however. In the wake of the Battle of Mishmar HaEmek in mid April 1948, several of the surrounding villages were occupied by the Haganah. The Irgun, a Jewish paramilitary group, took advantage of Israel's gains and Khubbayza was one of several other villages captured between May 12 and May 14. Most of the inhabitants fled after mortar attacks. Following the war the area was incorporated into the State of Israel and the lands of Khubbayza were left undeveloped. According to Palestinian historian Walid Khalidi, in 1992 the site consisted of only "stone debris, scattered among thorny bushes".

== Bibliography ==
- Barron, J.B., ed. (1923). Palestine: Report and General Abstracts of the Census of 1922. Government of Palestine.
- Conder, C.R.; Kitchener, H.H. (1882). The Survey of Western Palestine: Memoirs of the Topography, Orography, Hydrography, and Archaeology. Vol. 2. London: Committee of the Palestine Exploration Fund.
- Government of Palestine, Department of Statistics (1945). Village Statistics, April, 1945.
- Guérin, V. (1875). Description Géographique Historique et Archéologique de la Palestine (in French). Vol. 2: Samarie, pt. 2. Paris: L'Imprimerie Nationale.
- Hadawi, S. (1970). Village Statistics of 1945: A Classification of Land and Area ownership in Palestine. Palestine Liberation Organization Research Center. Archived from the original on 2018-12-08.
- Khalidi, W. (1992). All That Remains: The Palestinian Villages Occupied and Depopulated by Israel in 1948. Washington D.C.: Institute for Palestine Studies. ISBN 0-88728-224-5.
- Mills, E., ed. (1932). Census of Palestine 1931. Population of Villages, Towns and Administrative Areas. Jerusalem: Government of Palestine.
- Morris, B. (2004). The Birth of the Palestinian Refugee Problem Revisited. Cambridge University Press. ISBN 978-0-521-00967-6.
- Palmer, E.H. (1881). The Survey of Western Palestine: Arabic and English Name Lists Collected During the Survey by Lieutenants Conder and Kitchener, R. E. Transliterated and Explained by E.H. Palmer. Committee of the Palestine Exploration Fund.
- Schumacher, G. (1888). "Population list of the Liwa of Akka". Quarterly Statement - Palestine Exploration Fund. 20: 169–191.
