= Khirbat Al-Kasayir =

Al-Kasayir خربة الكساير
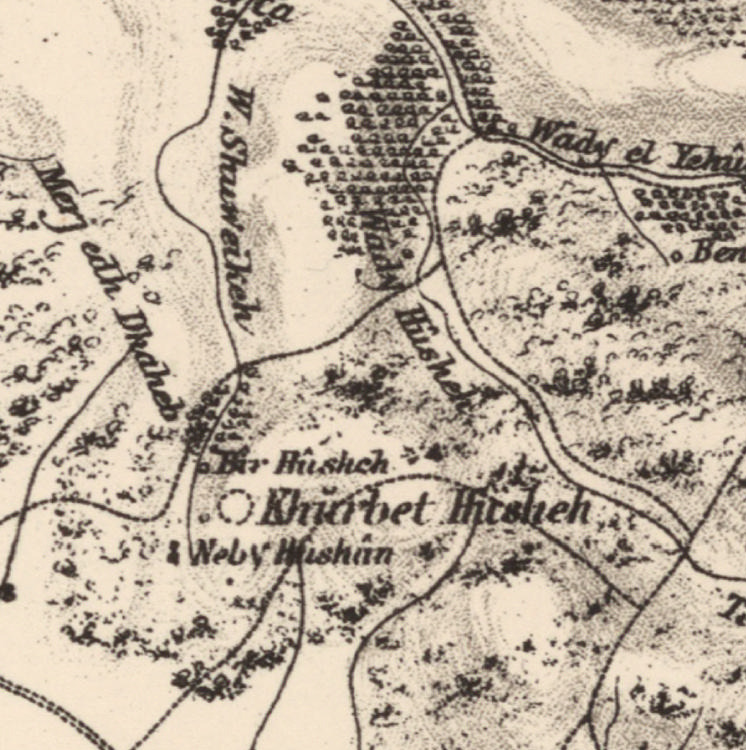
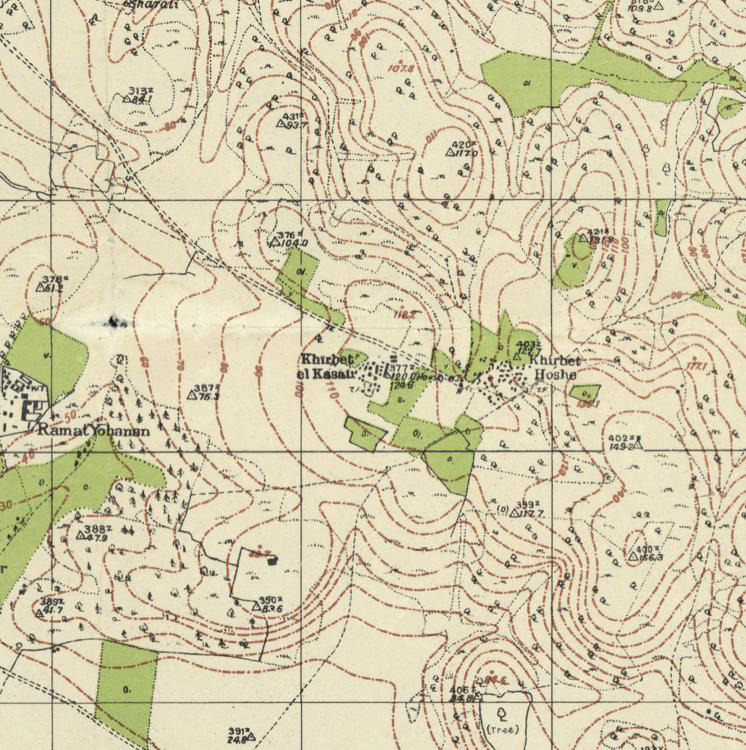
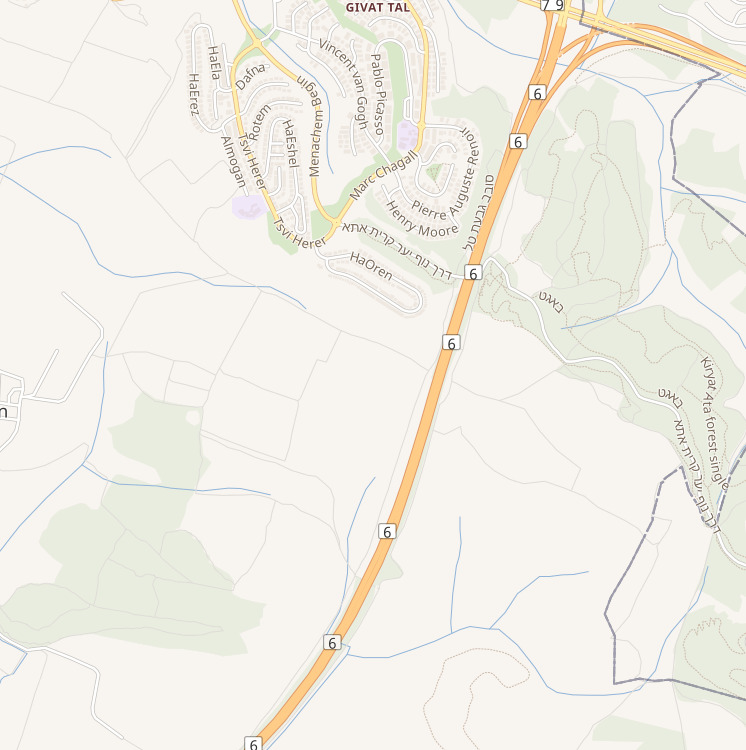
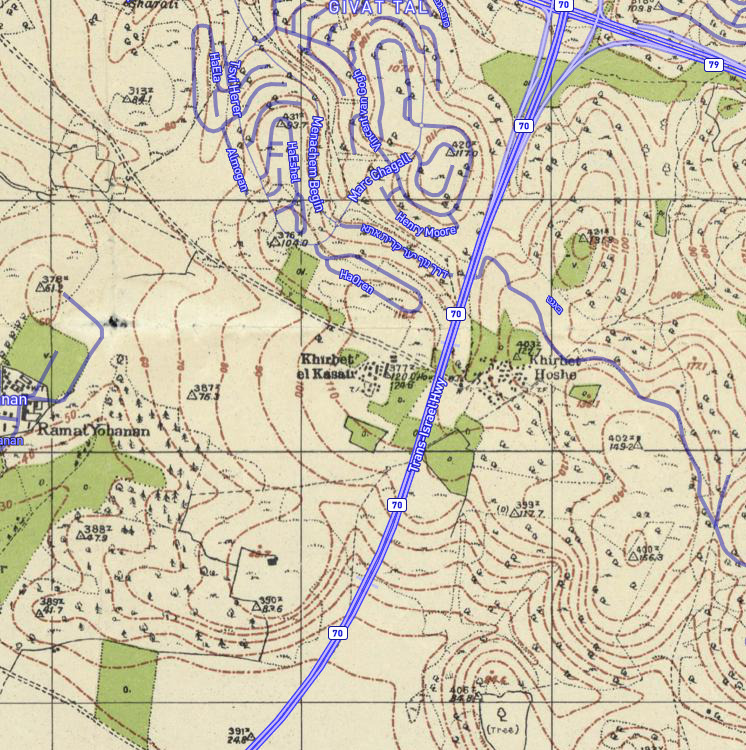
- 1870s map 1940s map modern map 1940s with modern overlay map A series of historical maps of the area around Khirbat Al-Kasayir (click the buttons)

- Location within Mandatory Palestine
- Coordinates: 32°47′36″N 35°08′19″E
- Palestine grid: 163/244
- Geopolitical entity: Mandatory Palestine
- Subdistrict: Haifa
- Date of depopulation: mid-April, 1948

Population (1945)
  - Total: 290
- Cause(s) of depopulation: Military assault by Yishuv forces

Al-Kasayir (Arabic: خربة الكساير, Hebrew: ח'ירבת אל-קסאייר) was a Palestinian Arab village in the Haifa Subdistrict, located 13 km east of Haifa. It was depopulated during the 1947–48 Civil War in Mandatory Palestine on April 16, 1948, under the Battle of Mishmar HaEmek.

== History ==
In the 1945 statistics Khirbat Al-Kasayir was counted among Shefa-'Amr suburbs, and it was noted with a population of 290 Muslims.

== Bibliography ==
- Government of Palestine, Department of Statistics (1945). Village Statistics, April, 1945.
- Hadawi, S. (1970). Village Statistics of 1945: A Classification of Land and Area ownership in Palestine. Palestine Liberation Organization Research Center. Archived from the original on 2018-12-08.
- Khalidi, W. (1992). All That Remains: The Palestinian Villages Occupied and Depopulated by Israel in 1948. Washington D.C.: Institute for Palestine Studies. ISBN 0-88728-224-5.
- Morris, B. (2004). The Birth of the Palestinian Refugee Problem Revisited. Cambridge University Press. ISBN 978-0-521-00967-6.
