= Al-Zughraniya =

Late Ottoman agricultural estate near Binyamina, Israel

al-Zughraniyya
- الزرغانية
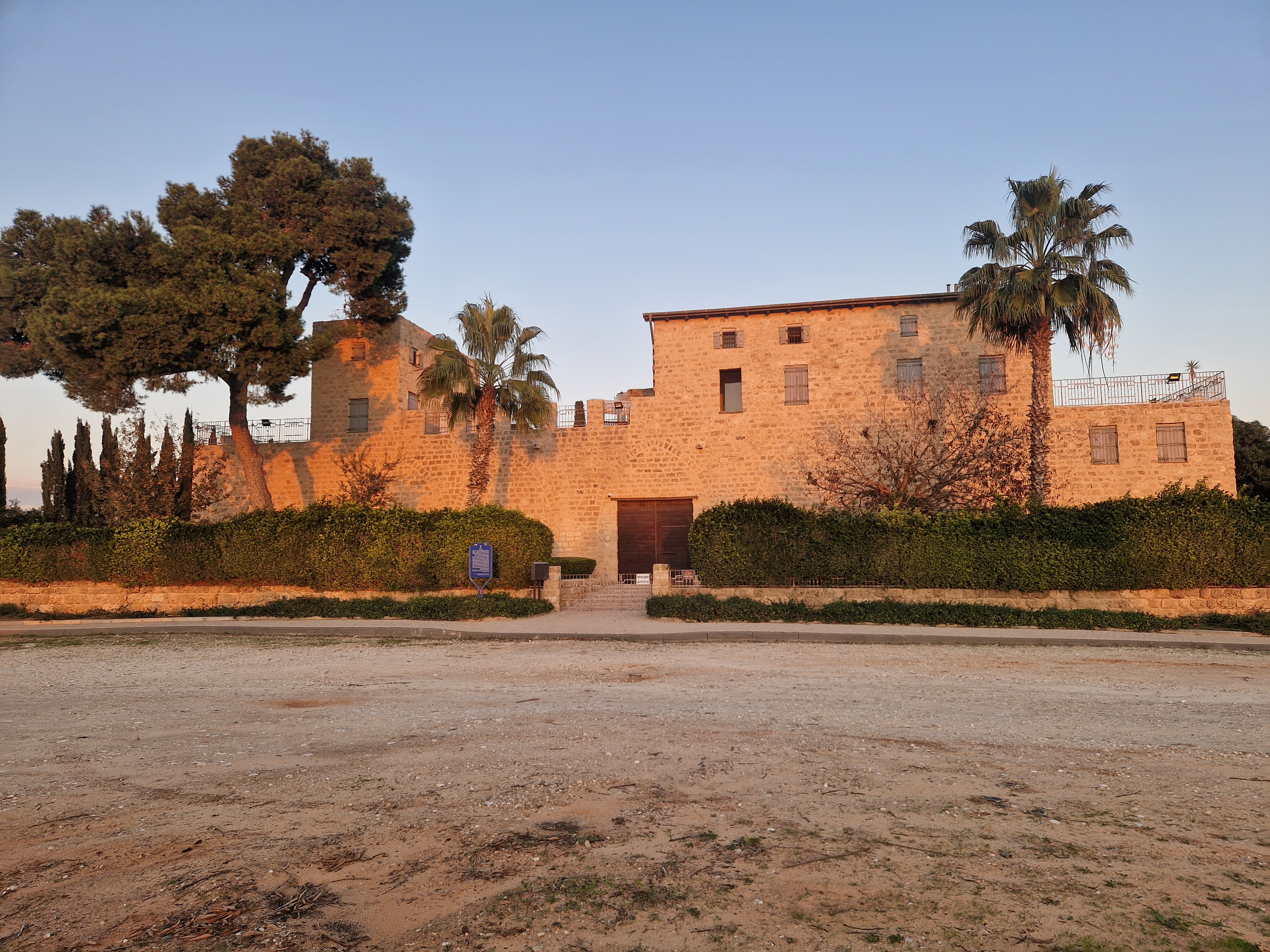

- Location within Israel
- Alternative names: al-Zarganiya; az-Zargūniya; Zarkaniya; Zar‘aniya; Hebrew: זרעוניה (Zera‘oniya)

General information
- Status: Private residence; locally listed heritage site
- Location: Binyamina–Giv'at Ada, Haifa District, Israel
- Coordinates: 32°31′16″N 34°56′04″E
- Construction started: late 19th century

Al-Zughraniyya (Arabic: الزغرانية), known in Hebrew as Khan Zera‘oniya (ח'אן זרעוניה), is a Late Ottoman estate west of Binyamina-Giv'at Ada near Caesarea Maritima. Founded by Muslim Bosnian landholders in the 1880s, and acquired in the 1900s by the Jewish Colonization Association (JCA), Al-Zurghaniyya served as a PICA experimental farm. It is one of the Bosnian estates established around Qisarya (Caesarea), alongside al-Manshiya, al-Sufsafa, Burj al-Kheil and Hudaydun.

== Name ==
Historical transcriptions include al-Zarġāniyya/Zarganiya, az-Zargūniya, Zarkaniya, Zar‘aniya, and the modern Hebrew Zera‘oniya. The name was often linked to nearby Nahal Taninim (Wadi az-Zarqa) and was interpreted in Hebrew as relating to zeraʿ (“seed”). Despite the common label khan (caravanserai), the complex was conceived and used as a private manor farm rather than a roadside inn.

== History ==
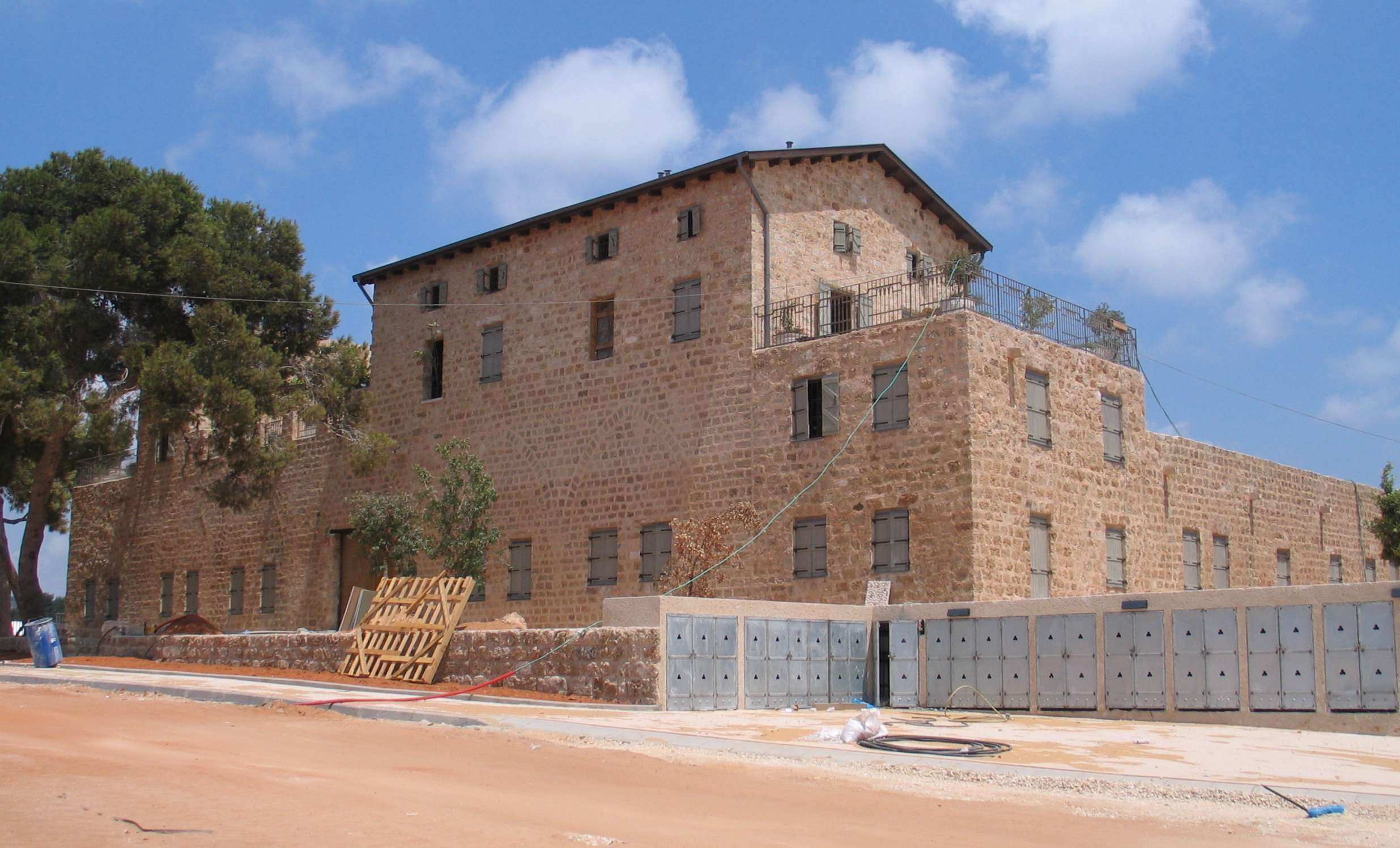
The Khan Zera‘oniya manor (al-Zughraniyya) near Binyamina, photographed in August 2012.

The estate lies on a site with earlier occupation; a survey recorded Byzantine-period pottery.

In the late 1870s–1880s, following the Austro-Hungarian occupation of Bosnia and Herzegovina, Ottoman authorities settled Bosnian Muslim migrants in and around Caesarea. The tract was assigned to a notable named Sadeq Pasha, whose residence was built at the estate’s highest point to command the fields and avoid the malarial Kabara marshlands; later owners included Fawzi Bey and his brother Jamal Bey, while Tawfiq Bey resided in the manor.

The compound is a square kurkar manor enclosing a single-entry courtyard; portions incorporate spolia from Caesarea. A second storey housed the owners; while rooms on the ground-floor originally opened only to the inner court, with later exterior windows added by 20th-century groups. Nearby stands an Persian wheel (saqiya) well, later coupled to a diesel pump and metal piping for field irrigation.

In the early 20th century the property was purchased by the Jewish Colonization Association. In 1920 a group of demobilized Jewish Legion veterans settled at the estate, followed in 1921 by the “California Group” and the “Dutch Group,” the latter influenced by agronomist Zelig Soskin’s intensive methods; both groups later moved into Binyamina. PICA later operated the site as an experimental farm cultivating jasmine for perfumery, grape varieties and fruit trees, and raising eucalyptus seedlings under British Mandate afforestation concessions. However, severe malaria in summer forced seasonal relocation of workers to Caesarea. Press accounts and later recollections also document the site’s use as a PICA trial station and its small interwar population.

By the 1960s the building was privately held and locally listed for preservation. After receivership proceedings, a long-term lease tender in 2005 was awarded to Shula and Ze’ev Moses, who renovated and adapted parts of the compound as private residences; public access remains limited.

=== Ben Zvi affair ===
In the early 1920s, al-Zughraniyya became the site of the Ben Zvi affair. The estate was inhabited by ikarim (farmers) and their Arab laborers. Among the settlers was a young activist called "Ben Tsvi,in contemporary, who became involved in communist circles in Hadera and the northern coastal plain.

According to surviving British CID intelligence reports, Ben Tsvi’s activities at al-Zughraniyya included teaching Arabic to fellow Russian Jewish communists, recruiting Arab workers, and distributing communist pamphlets in Arabic and Russian. His correspondence, which confiscated in 1924—linked him with Trotskyist networks in Palestine, Egypt, and Russia. His efforts to organize Arab labor within the Zionist-owned estate alarmed both Arab nationalists and Zionist leaders, as they blurred community boundaries and undercut nationalist loyalties.

Although remembered mainly as a localized dispute, the affair reflected deeper political rifts in the region. For Arab villagers it symbolized Zionist encroachment on former Bosnian lands, while for the Yishuv’s leadership it exposed the dangers of communist infiltration within the new colonies. In later years, Arab communists would join the Palestine Communist Party, but the episode at al-Zughraniyya highlighted the volatility of labor relations and the competing ideologies that shaped the early Mandate period.

== See also ==
- Caesarea Maritima
- Bosnians in Palestine
- Bayyarat al-Khuri
- Barrat Qisarya
