= Tweet Your Thobe =

Social media campaign

Tweet Your Thobe, or #TweetYourThobe, was a social media campaign launched by Susan Muaddi Darraj in order to celebrate Palestinian culture in the United States. It was specifically conceived in wake of Rashida Tlaib's announcement that she would wear a thobe to her swearing-in ceremony as a Congresswoman, which met xenophobic backlash online.

== Thobe ==
Palestinian thobes are garments that "are hand-stitched carefully, by mamas, aunties, and sittis, with symbols that depict the wearer’s family, her village, the natural elements in her region" and feature tatreez, or elaborate Palestinian embroidery. They are often passed down generations, with some even being over a hundred years old.

== History ==
In the 2018 United States elections, Rashida Tlaib won the House election for Michigan's 12th congressional district, making her the first Palestinian American woman to serve in the United States House of Representatives. On December 14, 2018, she posted a photo of her thobe to Instagram, announcing that she would be wearing it to her swearing-in ceremony. The post went viral and drew lots of "criticisms" and "racist comments." Of her decision to wear a thobe, Tlaib stated to Elle:

"Throughout my career in public service, the residents I have had the privilege of fighting for have embraced who I am, especially my Palestinian roots. This is what I want to bring to the United States Congress, an unapologetic display of the fabric of the people in this country."

Muaddi Darraj, a novelist and professor, then posted the hashtag #TweetYourThobe on Instagram, Facebook, Twitter, and other social media platforms and created a private Facebook group where members could share pictures of themselves wearing their thobes. Overnight, the hashtag went viral; posts flooded social media, and multiple news organizations began reporting on the phenomenon, as well as contacting Muaddi Darraj directly for comment.

Following Tlaib's swearing-in to Congress, the hashtag experienced even more activity, with many Palestinian American women posting pictures of themselves in their thobes to follow suit.
