= Wafa Ghnaim =

Palestinian American artist

Wafa Ghnaim (Arabic: وفاء غنيم) is a Palestinian-American writer, artist, and business woman best known for her work in efforts to preserve and teach Palestinian tatreez art.

== Early life and career ==
Ghnaim was born in the United States to Palestinian parents, a father from Yaffa and a mother from Safad. She learned Palestinian embroidery from her mother at an early age. In 1993 she was awarded a two-year apprenticeship at the University of Oregon with her older sister, Fida. The two daughters assisted their mother in her "The Gardens" project, also known as "the dress of a million stitches" that was displayed in the Oregon State Capitol.

Ghnaim had her own embroidered mural titled "The Story of Cleopatra". Her book "Tatreez & Tea: Embroidery and Storytelling in the Palestinian Diaspora" which chronicles the story of her family and the passing of the Tatreez art throughout the generations, was published in 2016, then revised and republished in 2018. Between 2017 and 2021 she worked as instructor Syrian and Palestinian embroidery for the Smithsonian. Then as the curator at Washington's Museum of the Palestinian People.

In 2016 Ghnaim founded The Tatreez Institute to teach Palestinian embroidery and preserve the art.

== Works ==
- Tatreez & Tea: Embroidery and Storytelling in the Palestinian Diaspora (1st ed.: 2016, 2nd ed.: 2018)
- THOBNA (2023)
- Tatreez Companion (2024)
- Tatreez Beauty: A Coloring Book (2024)
