= Majdalawi weaving =

Palestinian style of weaving

Majdalawi weaving (Arabic: المجدلاوي) is a style of weaving which originated in the Palestinian village of al-Majdal, which was later occupied as the Israeli city of Ashkelon. Weaving and fabric production was a vital part of the community's economy, and its products were exported to a number of surrounding Palestinian communities.

After al-Majdal was ethnically cleansed in 1948, former residents continued to produce the style of weaving after being relocated to the Gaza Strip and other areas against their wishes.

== Weaving in al-Majdal ==
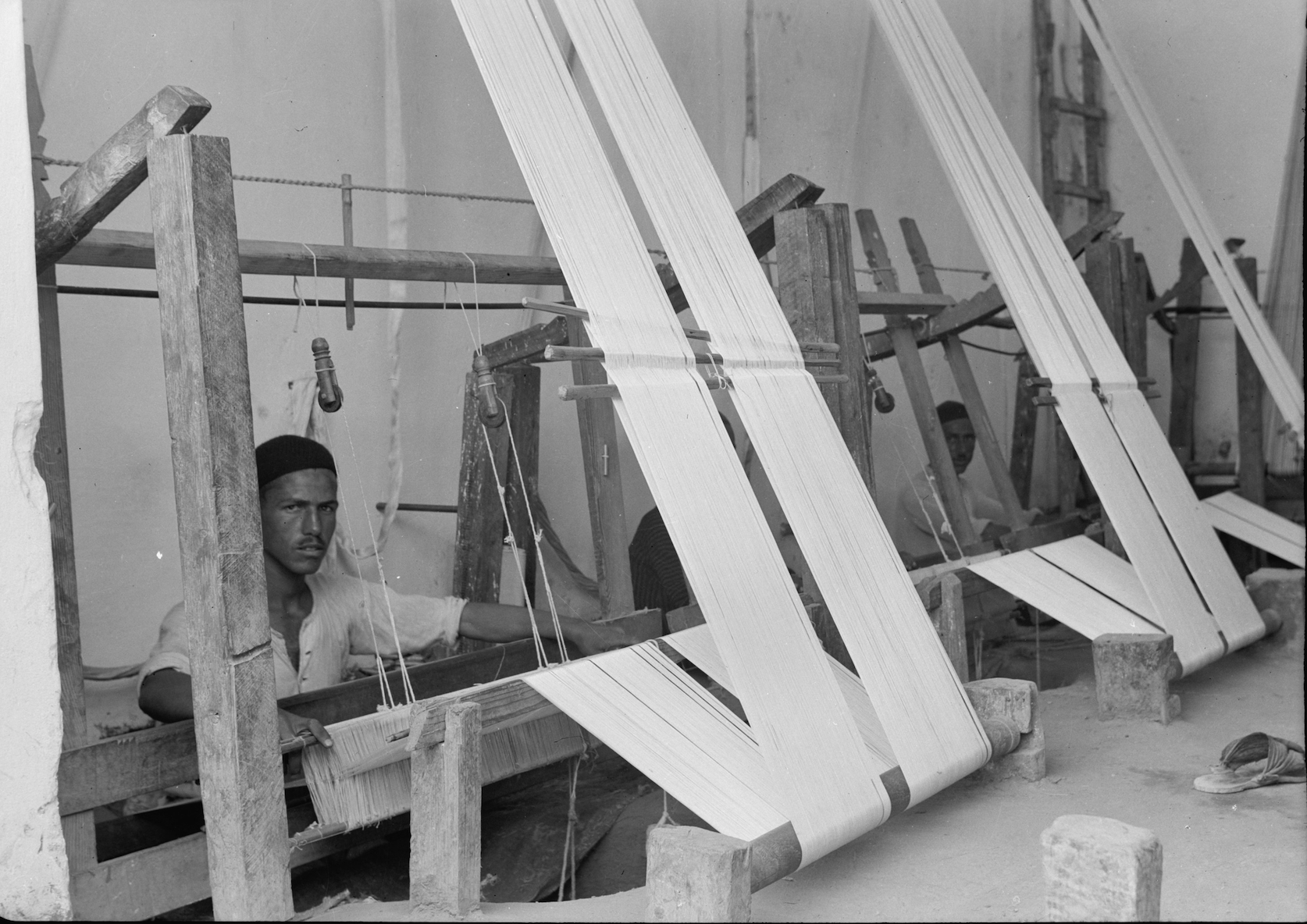
Weavers in al-Majdal, 1934–39

Traditionally, weaving in al-Majdal was done by men using single-treadle looms. The fabric produced by the community was mostly cotton and wool-based, and was used throughout the southern region of what is now Israel and Palestine. The fabric was often sold in eight-metre pieces, the amount needed to create a single thobe; it took weavers one or two months to weave each piece.

The three major fabrics produced were "malak" (silk), 'ikhdari' (bands of red and green) and 'jiljileh' (dark red bands). These were used for festival dresses throughout Southern Palestine. Many other fabrics were produced, some with poetic names such as ji'nneh u nar ("heaven and hell"), nasheq rohoh ("breath of the soul") and abu mitayn ("father of two hundred"). Other fabrics produced included Shash (white muslin for veils), Burk/Bayt al-shem (plain cotton for underdresses), Karnaish (white cotton with stripes), "Bazayl" (flannelette), Durzi (blue cotton) and Dendeki (red cotton). One of the most iconic fabrics had an indigo or black cotton base with pink or fuchsia stripes and turquoise accents.

At the height of al-Majdal's weaving industry, the community had around 800 looms. The town had around 500 looms in 1909. In 1920 a British Government report estimated that there were 550 cotton looms in the town with an annual output worth 30–40 million francs. The industry suffered from imports from Europe, and by 1927 only 119 weaving establishments remained. However, the weaving industry bounced back by the 1930s, when the town had about 400 looms, and residents continued to produce fabric until the late 1940s. This may be attributed to the fact that Majdalawi fabric was primarily being bought by local, rural populations, for whom European imports did not suit their needs.

According to Avi Sasson, weavers in al-Majdal imported raw thread from Egypt, India, and Europe, operating hundreds of manual looms. In the 1940s, approximately 2,000 looms operated in the town. They were frequently installed within private residences producing striped coarse fabrics for traditional ‘abaya coats and southern regional dresses.

Under the British Mandate government, weaving classes were introduced to the al-Majdal village school.

== After 1948 ==
Many weavers from al-Madjal were forced to relocate to the Gaza Strip, where they continue to weave in the Majdalawi style. Some weavers have also since moved to Egypt, or trained in Egypt. More women have also since taken part in the style.

In the 1990s, the Palestinian Authority attempted to revitalize the tradition in the Gaza Strip.

Since 2020, Yasmeen Mjalli's fashion brand Nöl Collective has used tatreez embroidery and Majdalawi fabric.

Many Majdalawi weaving workshops in the Gaza Strip have been destroyed since the beginning of the Gaza war in late 2023.
