= Barrat Qisarya =

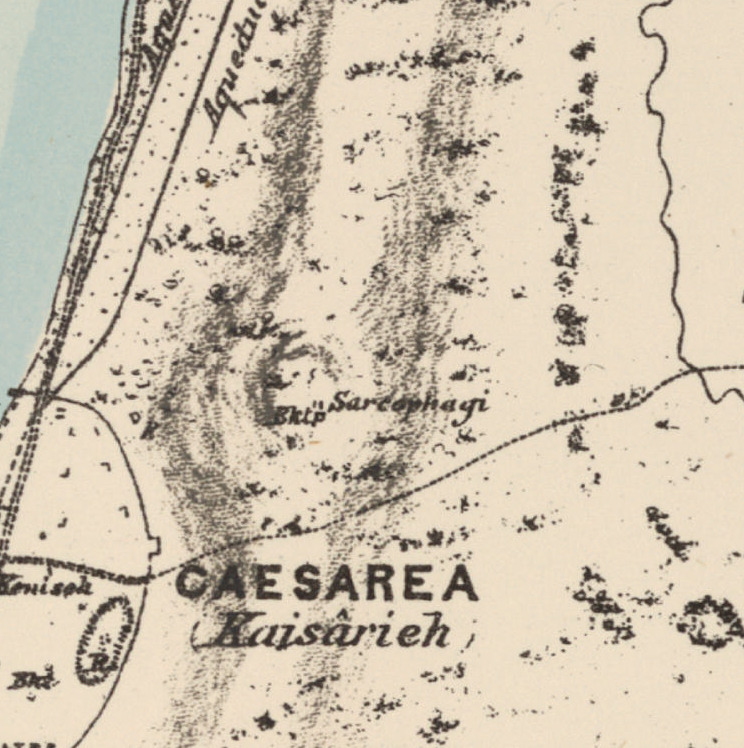
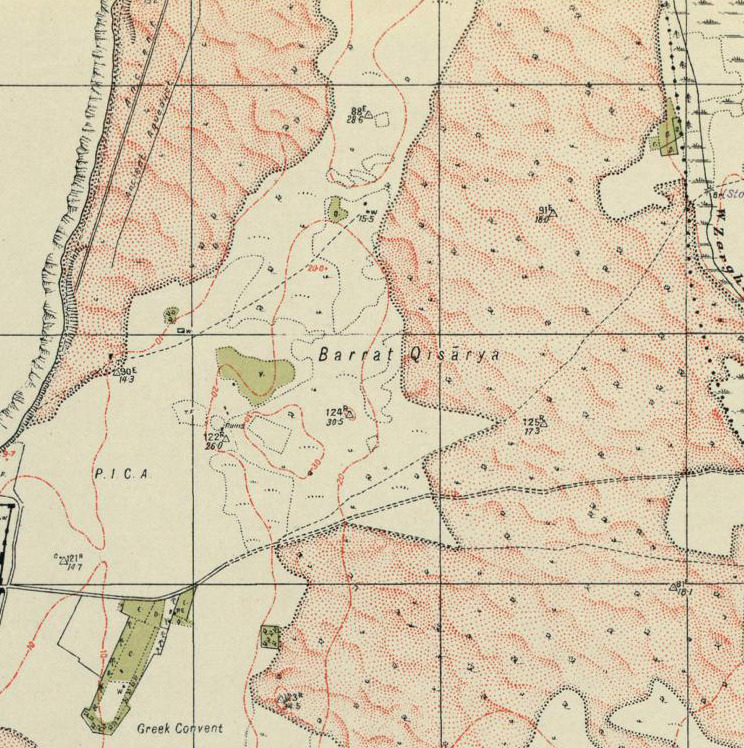
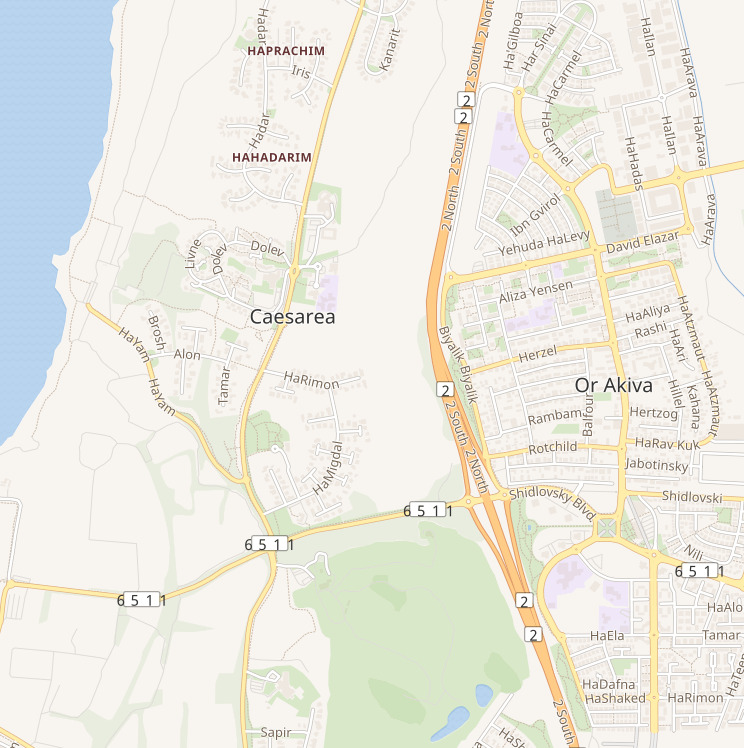
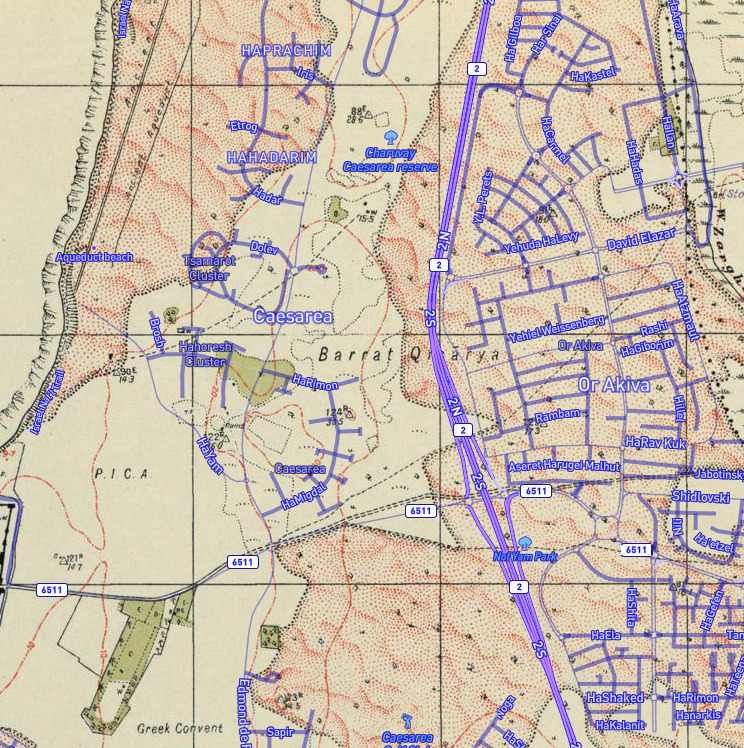
- 1870s map 1940s map modern map 1940s with modern overlay map A series of historical maps of the area around Barrat Qisarya (click the buttons)

- Location within Mandatory Palestine
- Coordinates: 32°30′34″N 34°54′33″E
- Palestine grid: 143/213
- Geopolitical entity: Mandatory Palestine
- Subdistrict: Haifa
- Date of depopulation: mid-April, 1948
- Cause(s) of depopulation: Fear of being caught up in the fighting
- Secondary cause: Expulsion by Yishuv forces
- Current Localities: Or Akiva

Barrat Qisarya (Arabic: برة قيسارية, lit. 'outskirts of Caesarea') was a Palestinian Arab/Turkmen tribal village in the Haifa Subdistrict.

Archaeological evidence for occupation of the Caesarea dunefield, including the village of Barrat Qisarya, includes pieces of marble, pottery and glass, as well as ruined walls. It was located 32 km southwest of Haifa. Today, the city of Or Akiva is located on the site.

The Arab al-Turkman of Barrat Qisarya were a semi-nomadic community that frequented the wetlands and coastal plain east of Caesarea and north toward the Kabara marshes during the Late Ottoman period. They lived a mobile, pastoral life, establishing seasonal encampments rather than permanent villages, and were often mentioned alongside the Ghawarneh (Marsh Arabs). Some worked as tanents in the Greek Orthodox Patriarchate of Jerusalem's rural estate called Bayyarat al-Khuri.

The Ottoman Land Code of 1858, which encouraged formal registration and taxation of rural land, spurred urban notables to acquire large estates in the region, reducing the autonomy of Turkmen groups. By the late 19th century, the Ottoman authorities resettled Caesarea with Bosnian Muslim refugees (c.1880), soon followed by Circassians and Arab migrants. These planned agricultural colonies gradually displaced or absorbed the semi-nomadic Turkmens. By the British Mandate period, their presence had largely receded, remembered mainly as one of the marginal or "unknown" populations of the coastal plain. The British Census of 1945 does not mention Barrat Qisarya.

The village was ethnically cleansed during the Zionist invasion on February 15, 1948. According to Morris in February 1948, the 'Arab al Sufsafi and Saidun Bedouin, who inhabited the dunes between Qisarya and Pardes left the area.

== Bibliography ==
- Khalidi, W. (1992). All That Remains: The Palestinian Villages Occupied and Depopulated by Israel in 1948. Washington D.C.: Institute for Palestine Studies. ISBN 0-88728-224-5.
- Morris, B. (2004). The Birth of the Palestinian Refugee Problem Revisited. Cambridge University Press. ISBN 978-0-521-00967-6.
