= Khirbat Al-Burj, Haifa =

Khirbat Al-Burj Burj Binyamina
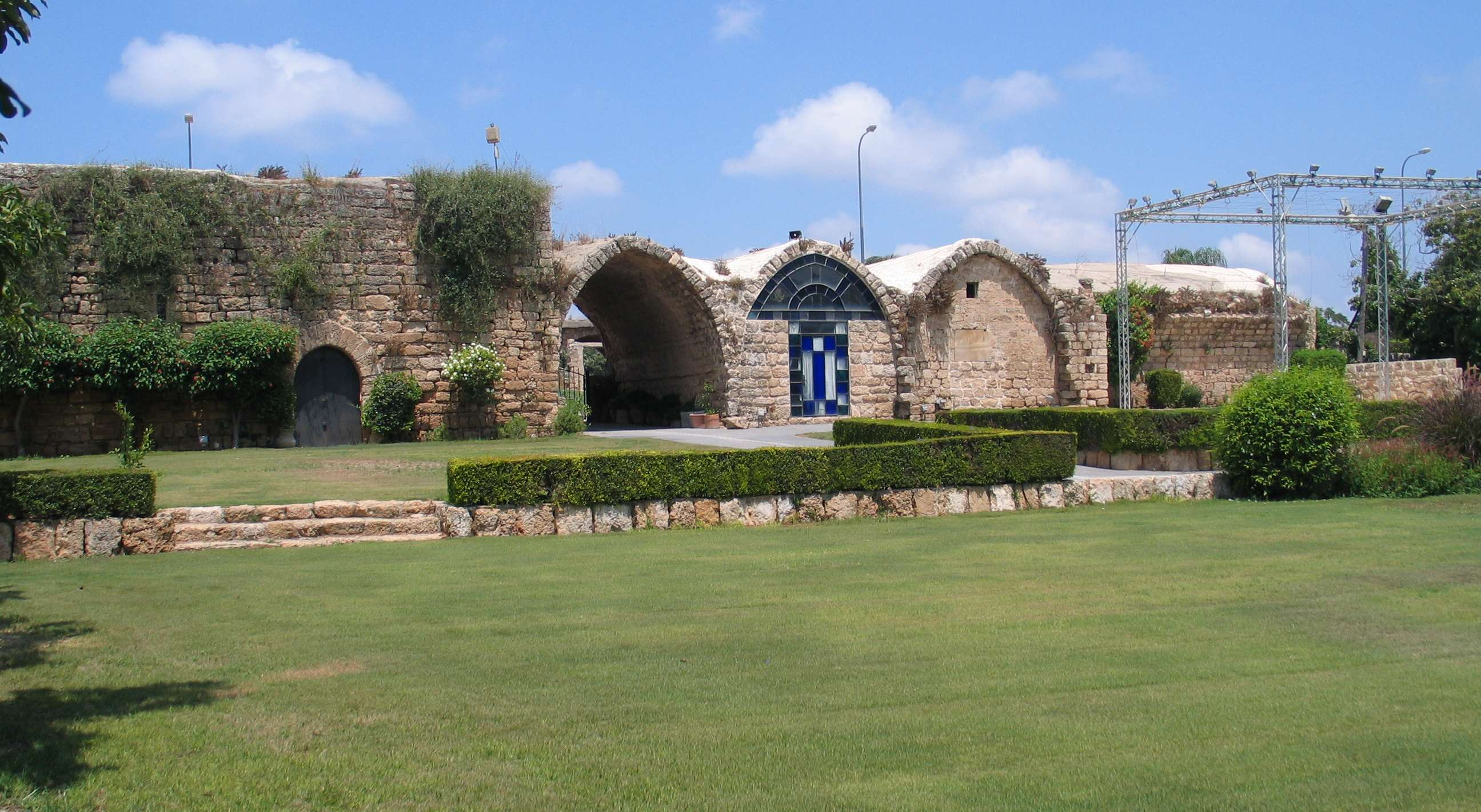
- Etymology: "The tower" in Arabic
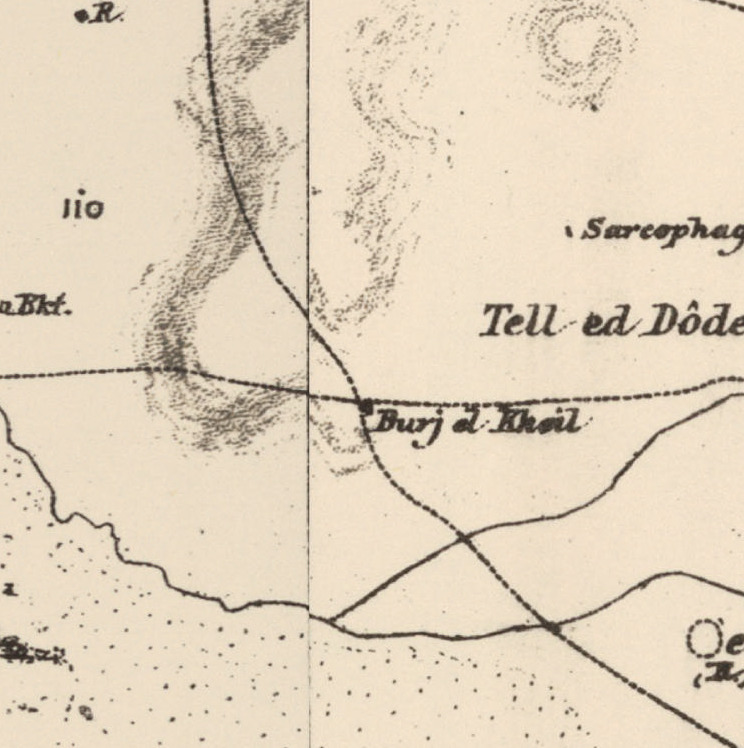
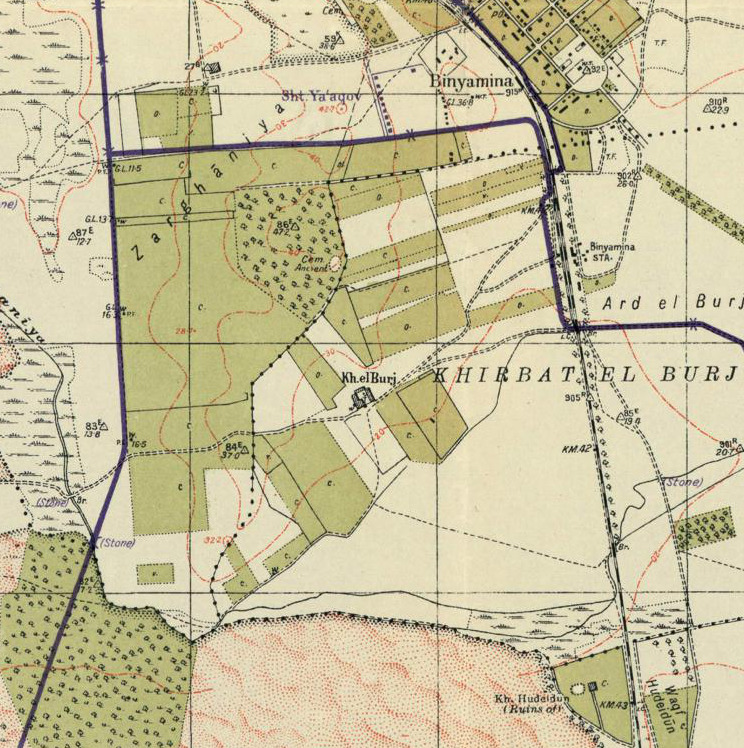
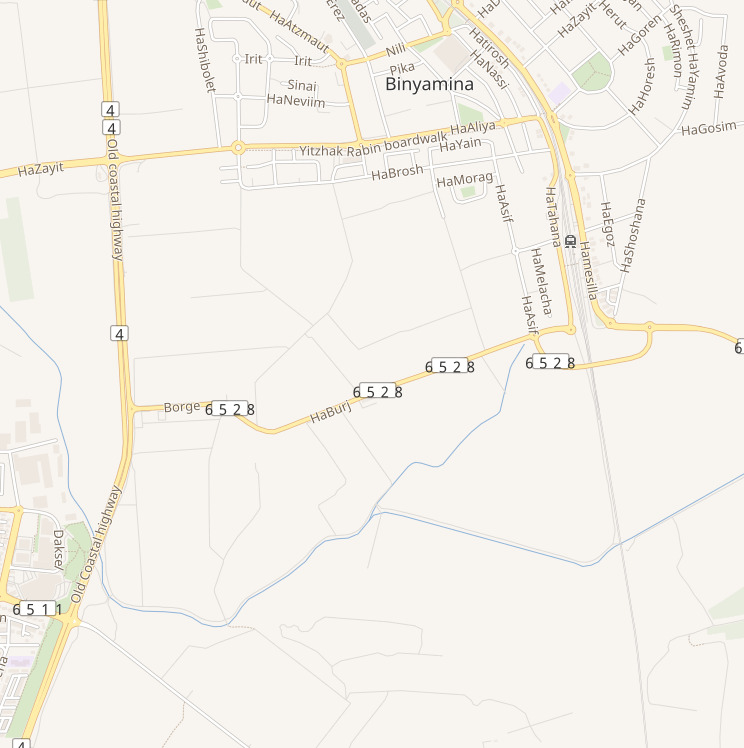
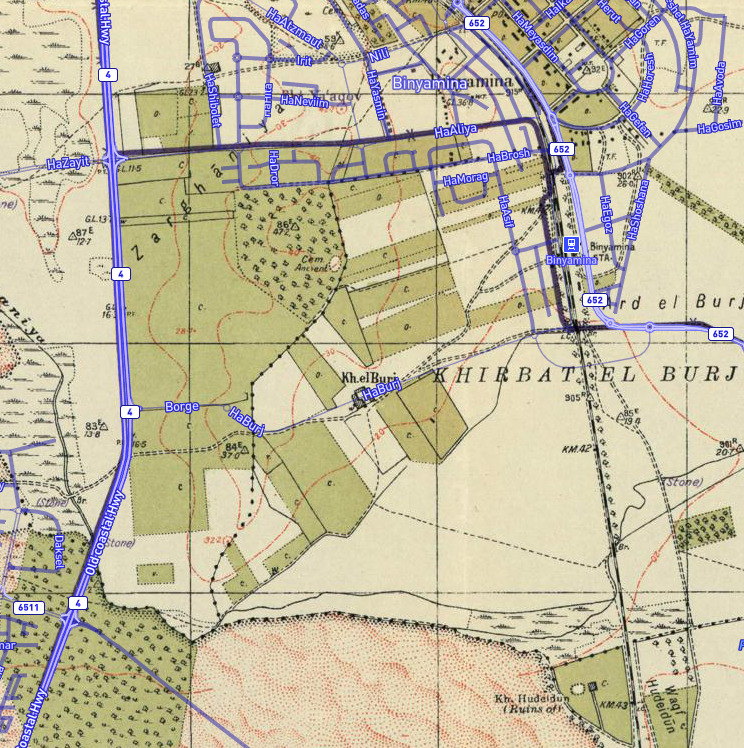
- 1870s map 1940s map modern map 1940s with modern overlay map A series of historical maps of the area around Khirbat Al-Burj (click the buttons)

- Location within Mandatory Palestine
- Coordinates: 32°30′35″N 34°56′28″E
- Palestine grid: 144/212
- Geopolitical entity: Mandatory Palestine
- Subdistrict: Haifa
- Current Localities: Binyamina

Khirbat Al-Burj was a former Palestinian village, depopulated in 1948. Presently, Khirbat Al-Burj (lit. "ruin of the tower") or Burj Binyamina is a ruined stone-built structure in the Sharon Plain 1 km south of Binyamina from the Ottoman period. It is one of the estates established around Qisarya (Caesarea), alongside al-Manshiya, al-Sufsafa, and Hudaydun.

== History ==
=== Byzantine period ===
During June 2009, archeological excavations in the courtyard of the Burj building from the Ottoman period exposed a small building that dated to the Byzantine period (5th–7th centuries CE). Byzantine ceramics have been found at the structure.

=== Crusader period ===
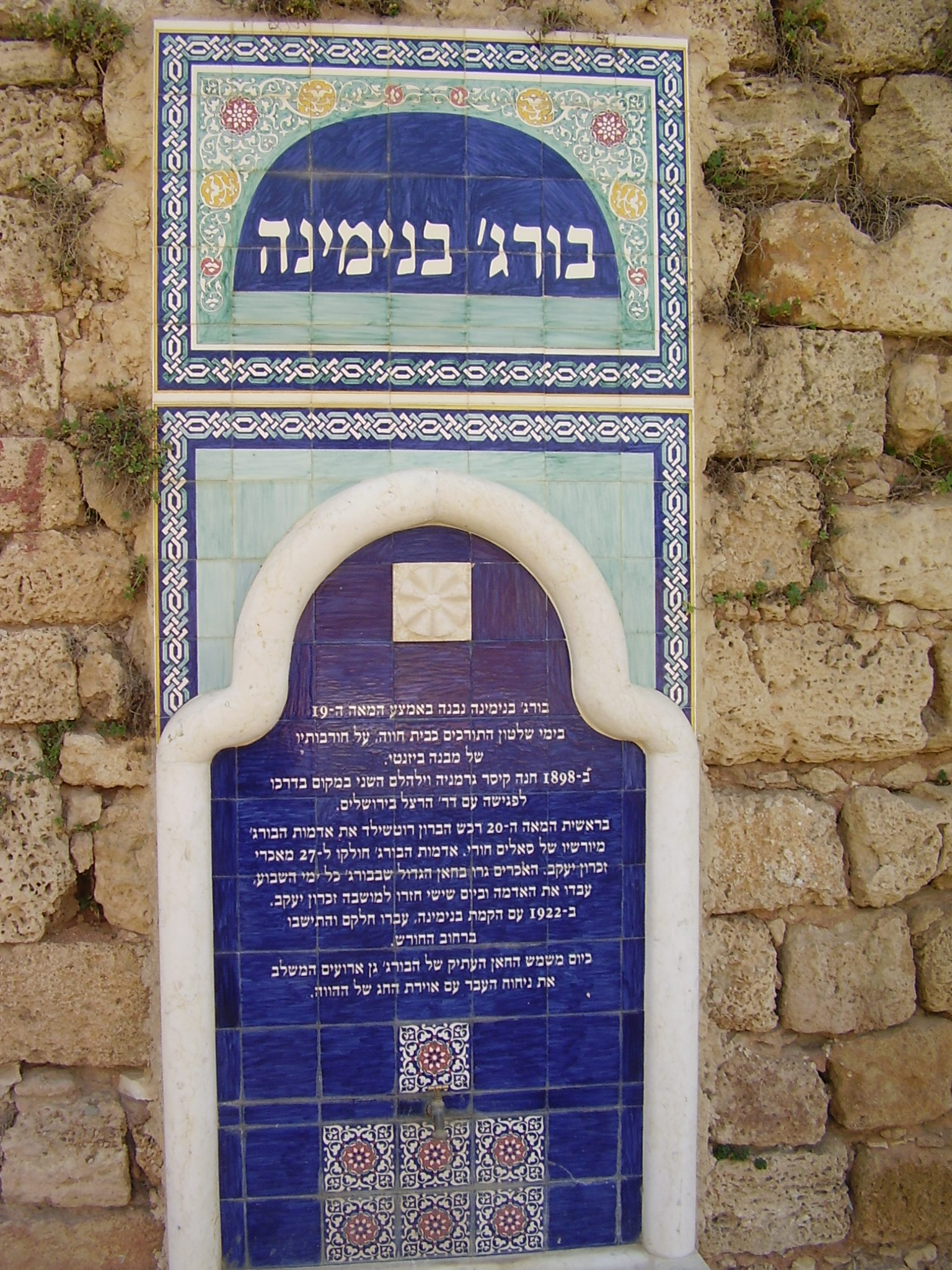
Burj Binyamina plaque

A stone with Greek inscription was found at the burj site, which has been reused in a Crusader fortress.

=== Late Ottoman and Mandate periods ===
In 1882, the PEF's Survey of Western Palestine (SWP), which called it Burj el Kheil, described it as "A Baikeh or cattle-yard in the plain".

Gottlieb Schumacher found in 1887 that the site had been settled since the PEF map was prepared, now consisting of "12 huts, moderate village". A population list from about 1887 give for that place, called Burj el Kheil, about 105 inhabitants; all Muslims.

On October 26, 1898, German Kaiser Wilhelm II stayed at the Burj khan (caravanserai) building during his visit to the Holy Land.

==== Early Zionist activity ====
Turkish owner, Sidki Pasha, brother of Jamal Pasha, sold 4,000 dunams of the Burj farmland to ICA in 1903. The serious drawback was that most of the land was an uncultivable swamp. Rothschild turned the land over to Binyamina's holdings. Initially a group of farmers from Zichron Ya'akov stayed at the khan during the week, due to the distance to their hometown. The group was called Burja’im.

==== Binyamina (1922) ====
Subsequently, Binyamina was founded. A letter from early 1920s describes establishment of Binyamina: "The 'Zichronim' [people of Zichron Ya'akov] owners of Burj farm decided to establish a moshavah in this farm, in order to settle their sons there…".

Kirbar al-Burj in 1942

Burj became Binyamina in 1922. In the 1931 census Khirbat Al-Burj was listed under Binyamina. The ownership of the village land was determined in 1934 according to the Land Settlement Ordinances.

By the time of the 1945 village survey, there were 5,291 dunums, 15 of which were owned by Arabs, 4,933 owned by Jews, and 343 were public.

The building, after renovations, now operates as an event venue.

==== Arab population issue ====
In the 1945 Index Gazetteer, Khirbat Al-Burj was listed as a "village unit" but "no population". According to Frantzman, the 1:20,000 map (produced 1924-1948) shows "a large structure, akin to a khan with no indication that it was populated". According to Khalidi, Khirbat Al-Burj was a Palestinian village which was depopulated by Israelis in 1948. Khalidi also says the "village" was "known for its citrus crops" and situated on "rolling terrain".

==== Agriculture ====
The red sandy clay loam (hamra) soils from Binyamina to Gedera, west of the coastal plain, were not cultivated till the 20th century. The original economy of Binyamina was citrus-based.

== Gallery ==
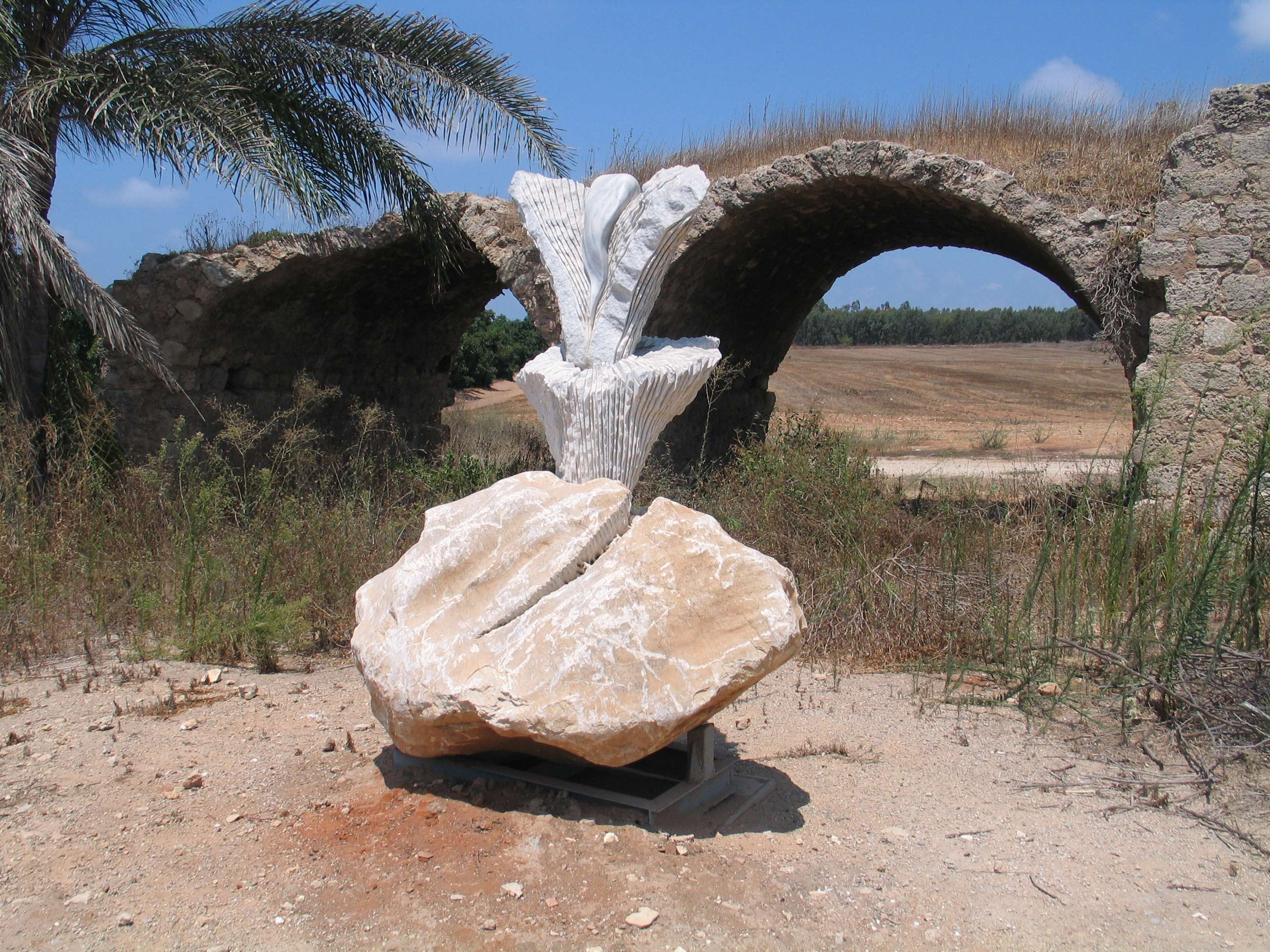

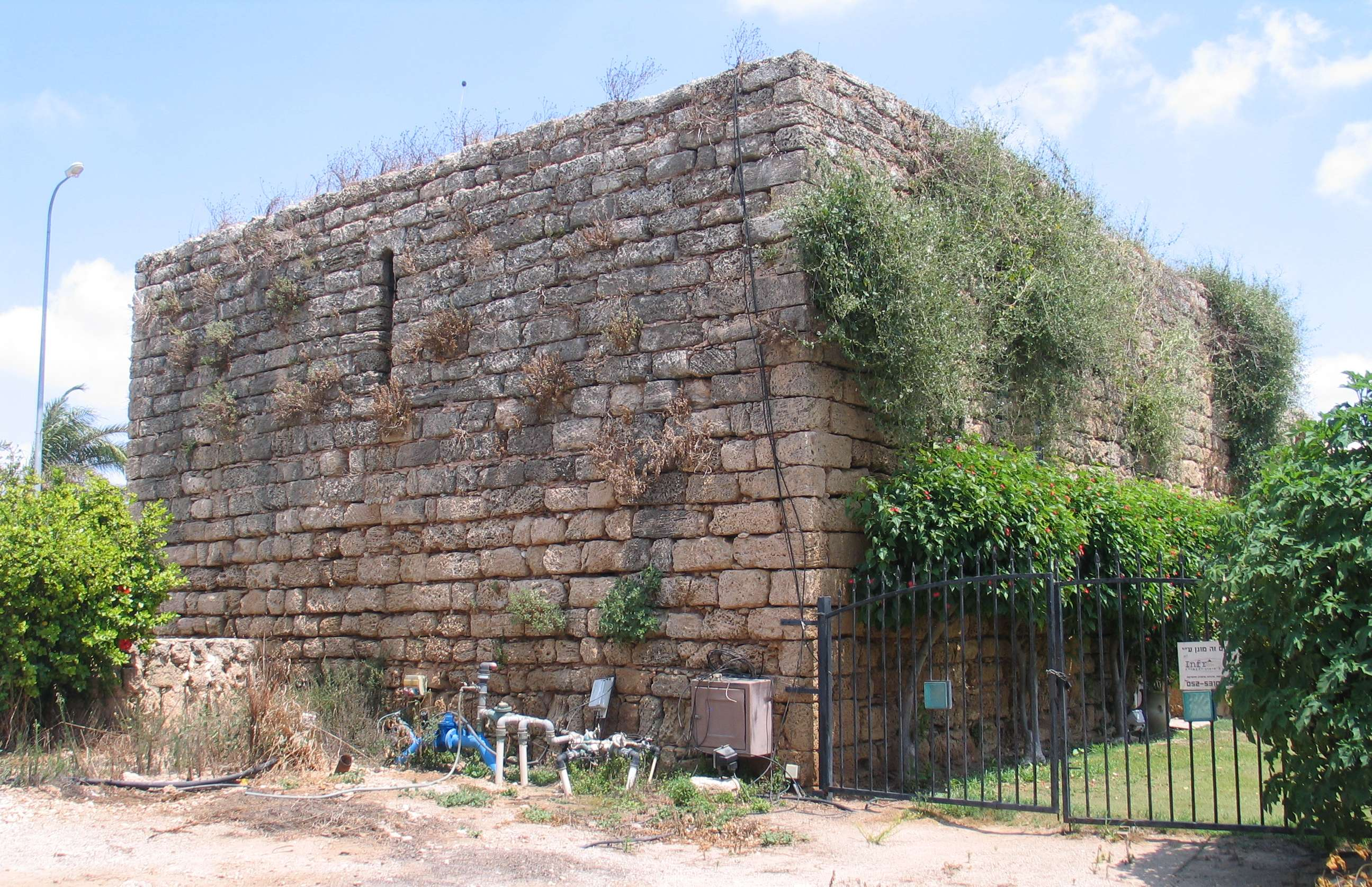

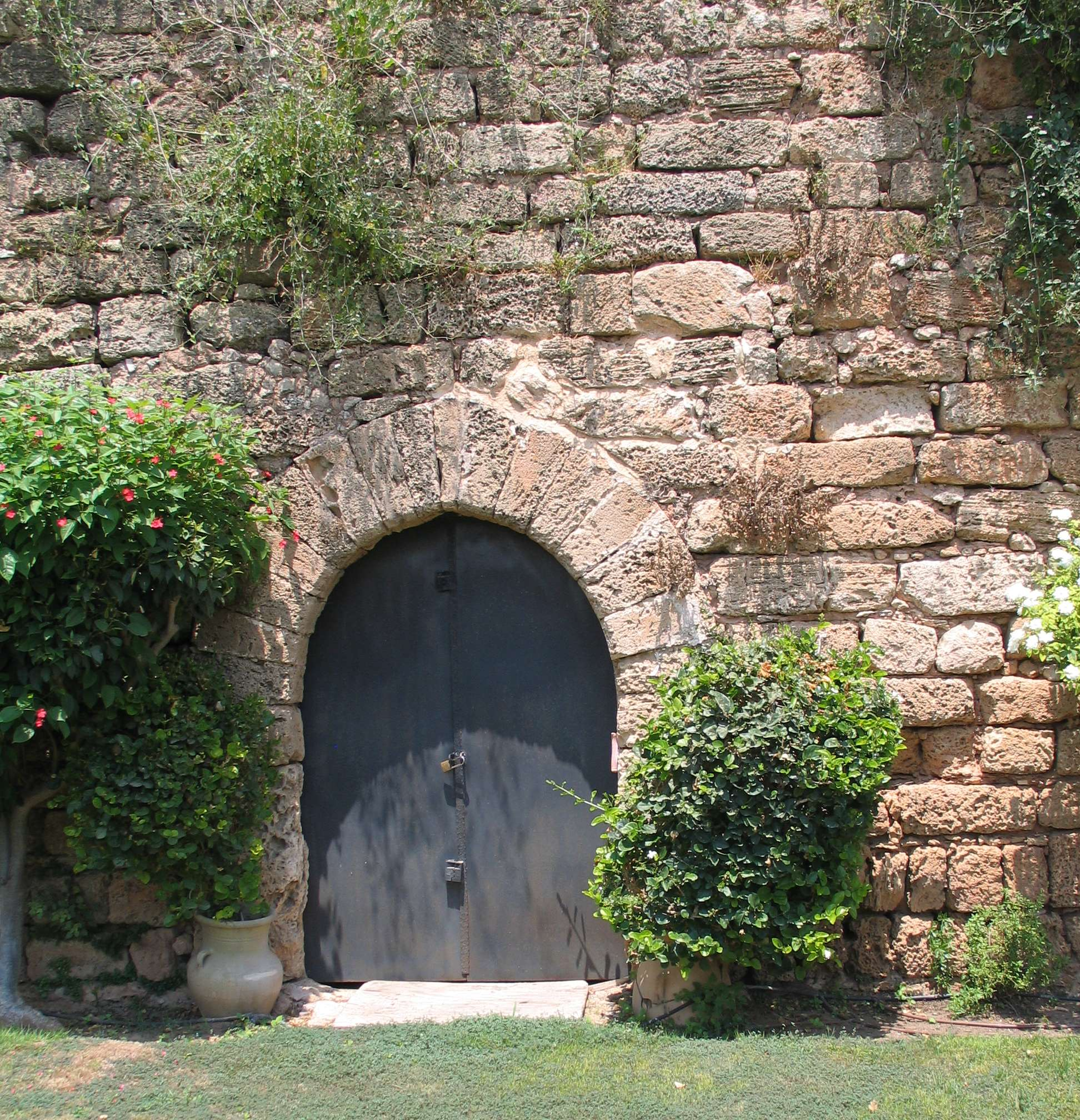

== See also ==
- Tel Burga - archeological site 1 km east of Binyamina, just outside the village land of Khirbat Al-Burj.

== Bibliography ==
- Avneri, Arieh L. (1984). The Claim of Dispossession: Jewish Land-settlement and the Arabs, 1878-1948. Transaction Publishers. ISBN 0-87855-964-7.
- Conder, C.R.; Kitchener, H.H. (1882). The Survey of Western Palestine: Memoirs of the Topography, Orography, Hydrography, and Archaeology. Vol. 2. London: Committee of the Palestine Exploration Fund.
- Dauphin, C. (1998). La Palestine byzantine, Peuplement et Populations. BAR International Series 726 (in French). Vol. III: Catalogue. Oxford: Archeopress. ISBN 0-860549-05-4.
- Government of Palestine, Department of Statistics (1945). Village Statistics, April, 1945.
- Hadawi, S. (1970). Village Statistics of 1945: A Classification of Land and Area ownership in Palestine. Palestine Liberation Organization Research Center. Archived from the original on 2018-12-08.
- Khalidi, W. (1992). All That Remains: The Palestinian Villages Occupied and Depopulated by Israel in 1948. Washington D.C.: Institute for Palestine Studies. ISBN 0-88728-224-5.
- Masarwa, Durar (2011-08-18). "Benyamina, Burj Benyamina" (123). Hadashot Arkheologiyot – Excavations and Surveys in Israel.
- Mills, E., ed. (1932). Census of Palestine 1931. Population of Villages, Towns and Administrative Areas. Jerusalem: Government of Palestine.
- Palmer, E.H. (1881). The Survey of Western Palestine: Arabic and English Name Lists Collected During the Survey by Lieutenants Conder and Kitchener, R. E. Transliterated and Explained by E.H. Palmer. Committee of the Palestine Exploration Fund.
- Schumacher, G. (1887a). "Researches in the plain north of Caesarea". Quarterly Statement - Palestine Exploration Fund. 19: 95–84.
- Schumacher, G. (1887b). "Population list of the Liwa of Akka". Quarterly Statement - Palestine Exploration Fund. 19: 169–191.
