= Or Akiva =

City in Israel

Or Akiva אור עקיבא
- City
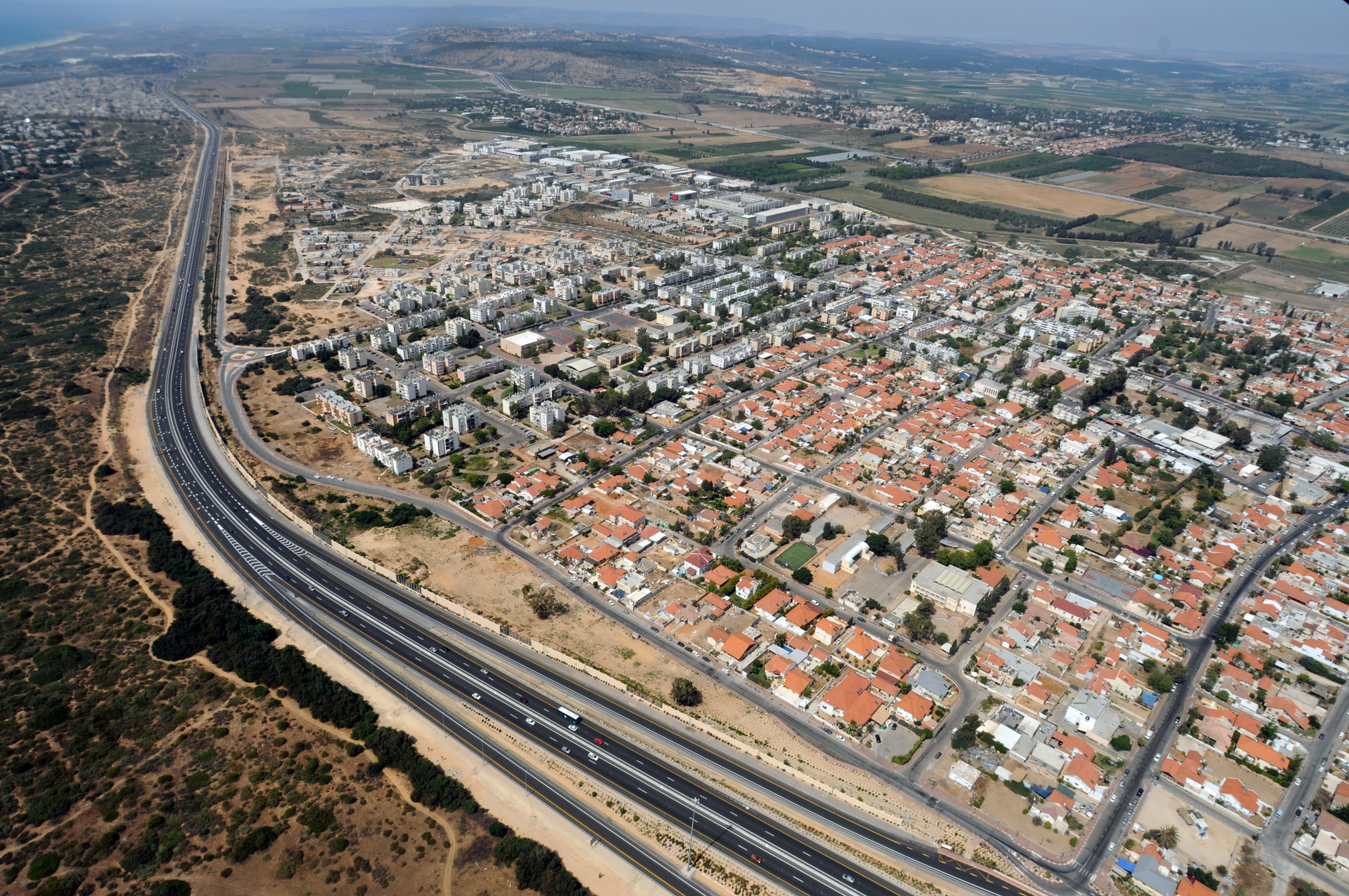
- View of Or Akiva

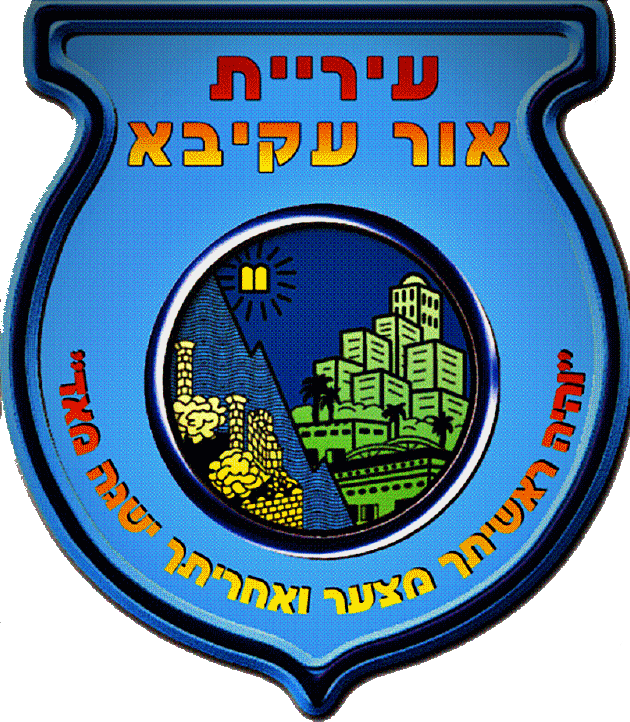
- Coat of arms

- Location within Haifa region of Israel Location within Israel
- Coordinates: 32°30′N 34°55′E
- Country: Israel
- District: Haifa
- Subdistrict: Hadera
- Natural Region: Hadera
- Founded: 1951

Government
  - Type: Mayor–council
  - Body: Municipality of Or Akiva
  - Mayor: Simha Yosifov (Likud)

Area
  - Total: 3,539 dunams (3.539 km^{2}; 1.366 sq mi)

Population (2024)
  - Total: 25,922
  - Density: 7,325/km^{2} (18,970/sq mi)

Ethnicity
  - Jews and others: 99.5%
  - Arabs: 0.5%
- Time zone: UTC+2 (IST)
  - Summer (DST): UTC+3 (IDT)
- Name meaning: Light of Akiva
- Website: oraqiva.muni.il

Or Akiva (Hebrew: אור עקיבא, lit. 'Light of Akiva') is a city in the Haifa District of Israel, on the country's coastal plain. It is located inland from the ancient port city of Caesarea and the Mediterranean Sea, and to the north of the city of Hadera. It is 39 kilometres (24 miles) south of Haifa and 48 km (30 mi) north of Tel Aviv. In 2024 it had a population of 25,922.

== History ==
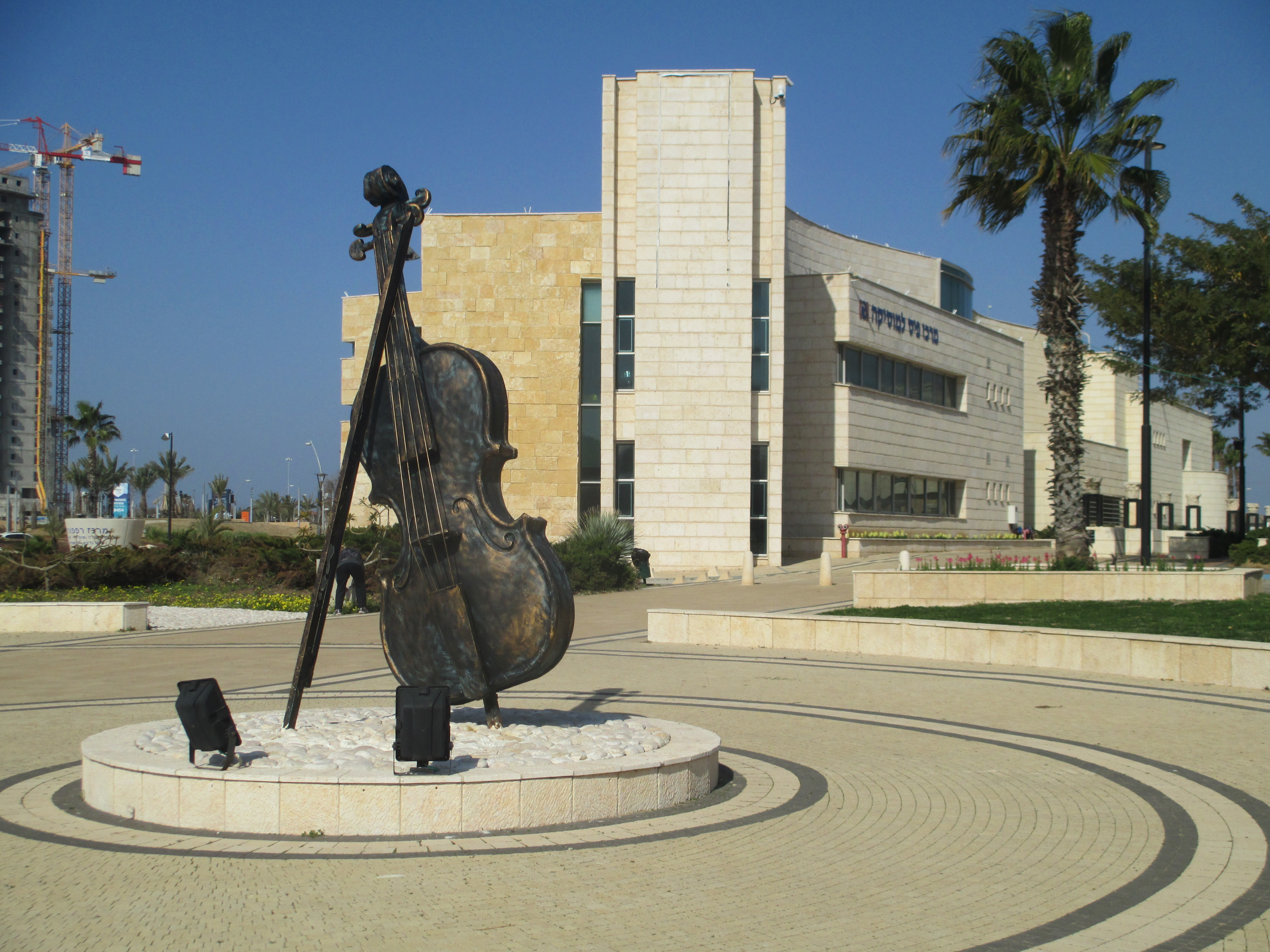
Or Akiva Music Center

Or Akiva was founded in the early 1950s as a ma’abara (transit camp) for new Jewish immigrants, the majority hailing from Morocco. It was built on the land of the depopulated Palestinian village of Barrat Qisarya. In the 1990s, new immigrants from the former Soviet Union began to settle there, which led to an upswing in building and development.

== Demographics ==
Historical population
Year	Pop.	±%
1972	6,500	—
1983	7,500	+15.4%
1995	13,600	+81.3%
2008	16,000	+17.6%
2022	22,173	+38.6%
2024	25,922	+16.9%

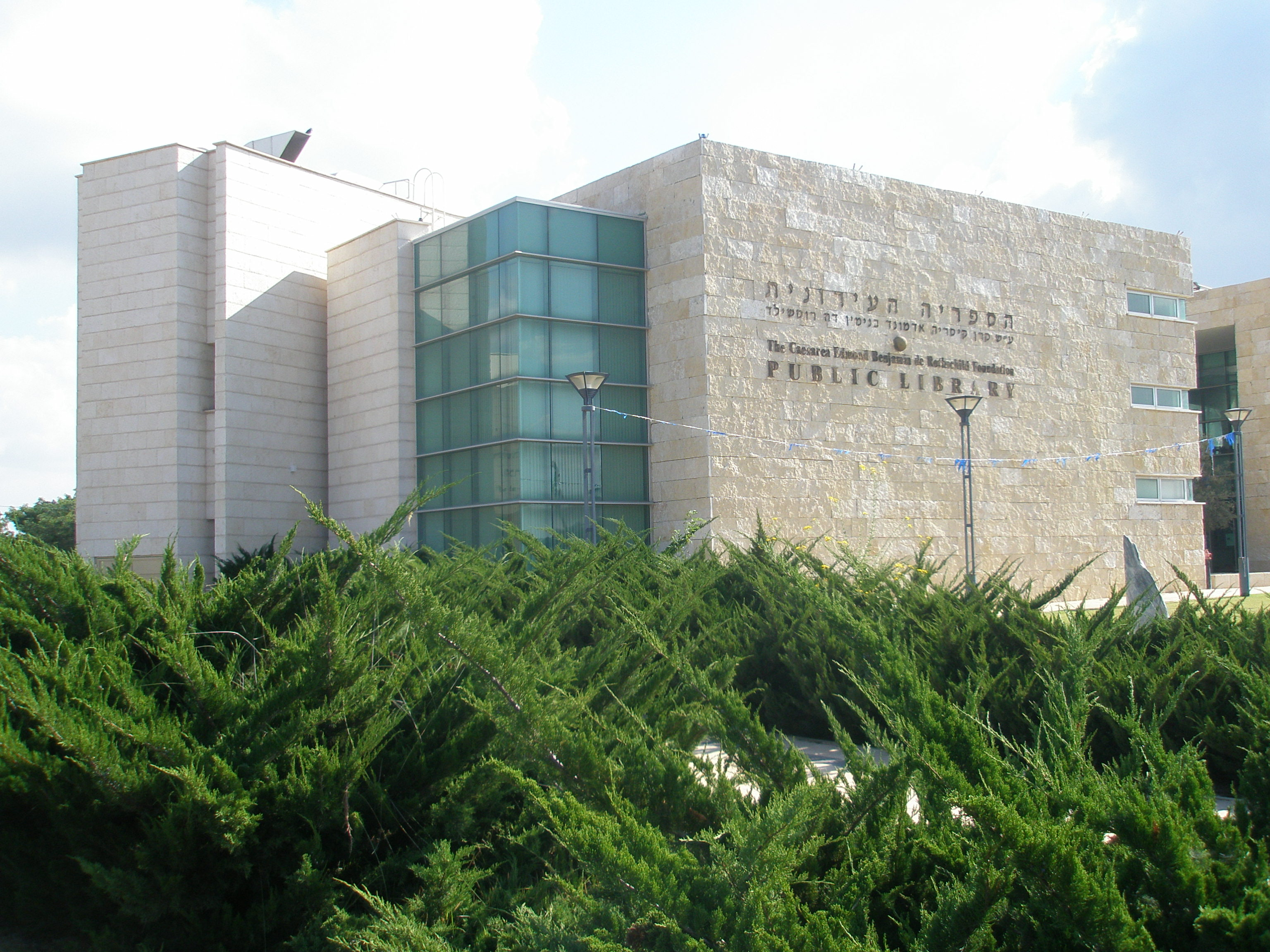
Or Akiva Municipal Library

According to the Israel Central Bureau of Statistics (CBS), at the end of 2005 the city had a total population of 15,800, making it is the least-populous city in Israel. According to CBS, in 2001 the ethnic makeup of the city was 99.3% Jewish and other non-Arab, with no significant Arab population. There were 7,400 males and 7,900 females. The population of the city was spread out, with 33.7% 19 years of age or younger, 15.4% between 20 and 29, 20.8% between 30 and 44, 16.3% from 45 to 59, 4.1% from 60 to 64, and 9.7% 65 years of age or older. The population growth rate in 2001 was -0.1%.

== Economy ==
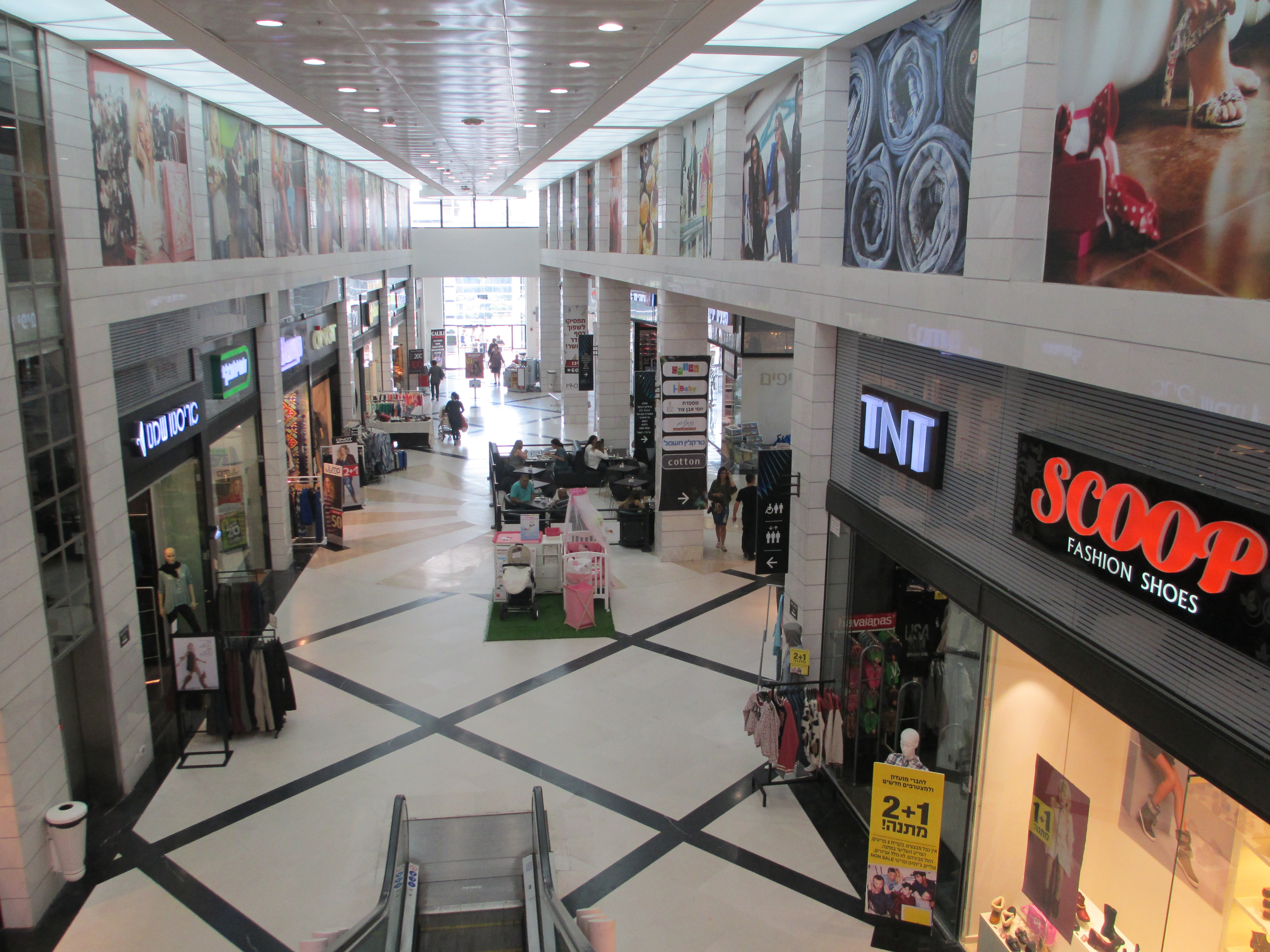
Orot Shopping Mall

Or Akiva is home to a number of large industrial plants, among them Dexxon (pharmaceuticals), Anna Lotan Ltd. (professional skin care), Darbox Ltd. (plastic packaging), Meprolight (gunsights and nightvision), Plasson (livestock feeders), Resonetics (medical devices) and Tyco International (electronics).

== Education ==
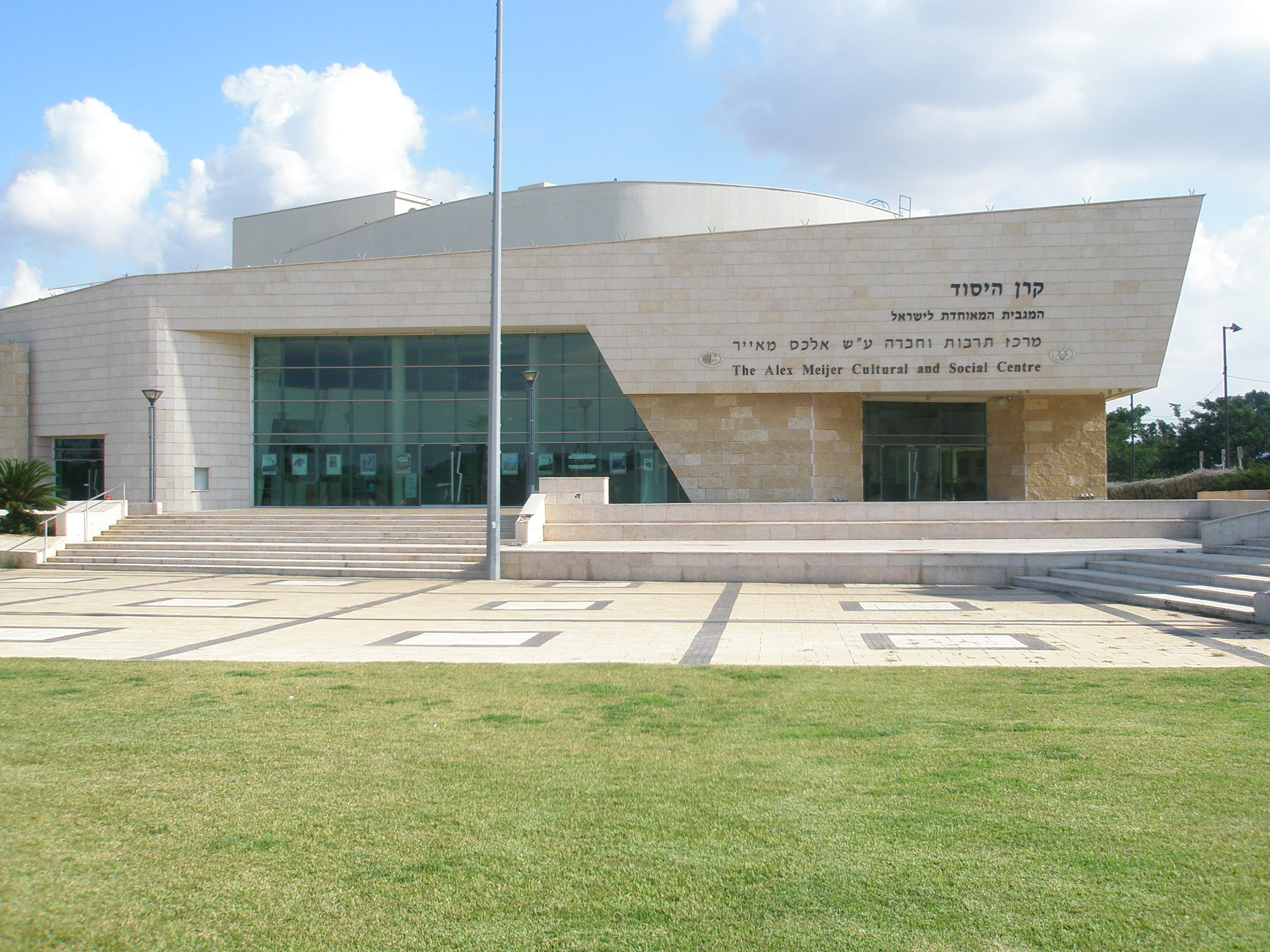
Or Akiva Cultural Center

According to CBS, there are 10 schools and 2,409 students in the city. They are spread out, as 6 elementary schools and 1,575 elementary school students, and 5 high schools and 834 high school students. 51.9% of 12th grade students were entitled to a matriculation certificate in 2001.

Since 2005 gap year volunteers from Habonim Dror have volunteered in the town and surrounding areas working in schools and in extracurricular frameworks with Arab and Jewish youth.

== Neighborhoods ==
=== HaYovel ===
Located in the north of the city, bounded by the northern industrial area to the east and road number 2 (coastal road) to the west. Today, about 4,500 residents live in the neighborhood, which is about 1,700 households.

=== Or Gardens ===
Located between the center and the south of the city bounded between Shidlovsky Boulevard to the north, Koplovich to the east and Hanasi Weizman Boulevard to the south and west.

=== Ben Gurion - Neve Alon - Kennedy ===
Located in the center of the city and is bounded between Shidlovsky streets in the south, Herzl-Stanley in the north, Ha'atsmaat in the east and the beach road in the west.

=== Neve Or ===
A new neighborhood on the eastern side of Or Akiva bounded by Route 4 in the east, Shidlovsky Street in the south, in the Ben Gurion neighborhood in the west.

=== Nof Yam ===
A new neighborhood on the west side of Or Akiva is bounded by Route 2 in the west, Shadilovsky Boulevard in the north and Shikimim St. in the south. The neighborhood is characterized by residential towers.

=== Shazar ===
An old neighborhood located north of the Ben Gurion neighborhood and bounded by Route 2 to the west and David Elazar St. to the north.

=== Rabin Gardens ===
Located in the south of Or Akiva, at the western end. The neighborhood is bounded between Hanasi Weizman Boulevard and Shidlovsky Boulevard in the north, Highway 2 in the west, east of King David Boulevard in the east (Orot neighborhood), to the south the Or Yam neighborhood.

=== Orot ===
Located on the eastern side of Or Akiva and bordered to the west by the Gani Rabin neighborhood, to the south by the Or Yam neighborhood and to the east by Highway 4.

=== Or Yam ===
A new neighborhood being built on the historic lands of Baron Rothschild by the Or Akiva Municipality and the Caesarea Development Corporation.

== Voting Patterns ==
In the 2022 election, 71 percent of voters in Or Akiva voted for the parties of the right-wing coalition led by Benjamin Netanyahu, while 27 percent voted for the parties of the center-left coalition led by Yair Lapid and 0.2 percent voted for the Arab parties.

In the 2026 election, 62 percent of voters in Or Akiva voted for the parties of the right-wing coalition led by Benjamin Netanyahu, while 32 percent voted for the parties of the center-left coalition led by Gadi Eisenkot and 0.2 percent voted for the Arab parties. An additional 3.9 percent voted for the Reservists, and 2 percent voted for Amcha Yisrael. Voter turnout increased 33 percent from the 2022 election.

== Notable people ==
- Rafi Dahan (born 1989), footballer
- Eran Levy (born 1985), footballer
- Lior Refaelov (born 1986), footballer

== International relations ==
=== Twin towns — sister cities ===
Or Akiva is twinned with:

- Miami, United States (Or Akiva has twinned with the Jewish community in Miami)
- Hîncești, Moldova
