= Bayyarat al-Khuri =

Late Ottoman and Mandatory-era ecclesiastical agricultural estate at Caesarea

Bayyarat al-Khuri (Arabic: بيّارة الخوري, "the Priest’s Citrus Orchard") was a late Ottoman and British Mandate–period ecclesiastical agricultural estate at Caesarea Maritima on the coast of Palestine/Israel. Established and operated by the Greek Orthodox Patriarchate of Jerusalem, the estate occupied the interior of Caesarea's Roman hippodrome and formed part of the Patriarchate's wider strategy of acquiring rural lands near sites of religious and strategic significance in the late nineteenth and early twentieth centuries.

Bayyarat al-Khuri offers a well-documented case of a Jerusalem Patriarchate estate in the coastal plain, illustrating how ecclesiastical landholding intersected with technology transfer (diesel engine, metal piping, Aegean building techniques), transnational migration of Bosnian, Circassian, and Jewish settlements), and geopolitical competition over land.

== Location ==
Bayyarat al-Khuri lay just southeast of the Bosnian-founded town inside the Crusader walls and entirely within the footprint of the Roman hippodrome. A monumental gateway bearing a taphos (τάφος) monogram linked the complex to the Patriarchate's Brotherhood of the Holy Sepulchre.

== Historical background ==
In the context of late Ottoman land reforms and expanding cash-crop agriculture, the Patriarchate pursued rural acquisitions across Palestine (e.g., near Jericho, Tiberias, and Nazareth), aided by Russian imperial patronage and pilgrimage networks. During the patriarchate of Damian I of Jerusalem (1897–1931), the Church purchased some 600 dunams south of the Caesarea–al-Shuna road in 1909 from the Ottoman governor Sadeq Pasha; additional built plots were acquired in the Bosnian town around the Crusader cathedral remains.

== Development and ownership ==
By the Mandate era, the Church held the more fertile cultivated tracts south of the Caesarea–al-Shuna road, while the Jewish Colonization Association (JCA) and, after 1927, its successor PICA held largely barren lands to the north. Contemporary maps sometimes labeled the estate a “Greek convent,” reflecting its effective status as church endowment.

== Architecture ==
The estate consisted of a well house, a large plastered storage pool, residential buildings for workers, and a roadside sabil east of the gate. Masonry was composed of imported Sasson et al. 2025, p. 196. limestone and the Levantine dibs technique (two ashlar faces with rubble core). The storage pool shows Greek construction habits, with ashlar courses tied by iron pegs; a diesel engine manufactured by Wagner Brothers of Jaffa pumped groundwater to the pool and open qanāt channels for irrigation.

== Agriculture and land use ==
Cultivation focused on irrigated citrus and olives within the hippodrome arena and date palms on higher surrounding ground, probably also serving as windbreaks. Despite investment, soil quality limitations constrained productivity; by the 1920s–30s, only a fraction of the Church's ~2,700 dunams around Caesarea was regularly cultivated.

== 1936–1939 Arab Revolt and decline ==
Christian presence at the site ended amid the 1936–39 revolt. In summer 1938 an armed company of rebels—allegedly from Caesarea, Irtah, or ‘Attil—kidnapped the Greek-Cypriot priest Hanna al-Khuri and his brother, leading them toward Tulkarm and killing them. Following the murder and ongoing land-settlement operations, the Patriarchate secretly opened negotiations with PICA to sell its Caesarea lands; archival correspondence indicates that Patriarch Timotheus I of Jerusalem (r. 1935–1955) expressed willingness to sell the estate sell if the Mandatory authorities confirmed his appointment.

== Later use ==
After 1948, nearby Kibbutz Sdot Yam utilized the estate's waterworks and structures for its first agricultural fields, adapting buildings as work sheds and storage.

== See also ==
- Greek Orthodox Patriarchate of Jerusalem
- Caesarea Maritima
- Palestine Jewish Colonization Association
- Brotherhood of the Holy Sepulchre
- Sabil (fountain)
