= Yasmeen Mjalli =

Palestinian fashion designer (born 1996)

- Born: 1996 (age 29–30); California, U.S.
- Education: University of North Carolina; Duke University
- Occupations: fashion designer; photographer; anti-street harassment activist
- Known for: founding Nöl Collective and the Not Your Habibti campaign

Yasmeen Mjalli (born 1996) is an American and Palestinian fashion designer, photographer and anti-street harassment activist. She is the founder of the fashion brand Nöl Collective and the Not Your Habibti campaign.

== Biography ==
Mjalli was born in California in 1996 to a family of Palestinian immigrants from Tubas, in the West Bank, and grew up in North Carolina.

Mjalli studied a bachelors degree in Art History at the University of North Carolina and a masters degree in liberal studies at Duke University in Durham, North Carolina.

After relocating to Palestine in 2017, Mjalli settled in Ramallah in the occupied West Bank. She has said that "it was when I moved to Palestine that I really took the time to understand the politics of fashion." Mjalli launched fashion label BabyFist in 2017, which rebranded as the Nöl Collective in 2020. Nöl (نول) in Arabic means loom and is a tribute to the city al-Majdal. The city was destroyed in 1948 and was famed for weaving. Nöl Collective is a slow fashion enterprise that celebrates Palestinian life and traditions, such as by using UNESCO recognised tatreez embroidery and Majdalawi fabric. Mjalli sources her material from local women’s collectives, family-run sewing workshops, and artisans. In 2021, she gave a talk titled "The Sustainable Future Lies in Indigenous Tradition" at TEDxAlManaraSquare. In 2023, she dressed Pakistani-American singer Arooj Aftab.

Alongside fashion, Mjalli is a women's rights activist. Mjalli is the "driving force" behind the Not Your Habibti (darling or baby) anti-street harassment campaign and has painted the slogan on denim jackets and T-shirts. The campaign was initially in response to her own personal experience of street harassment. She also launched the "Dear Mr Prime Minister" movement to put pressure on Palestinian lawmakers to introduce the Women and Children’s Act and to raise grassroots discourse and awareness about legal protections for women fleeing from domestic violence.

Mjalli also engages in film photography.

In February 2024, Mjalli and Nöl Collective worked to assist in the evacuation of weavers from Gaza, supporting some of her weavers to evacuate to Cairo, Egypt. She achieved the evacuation after launching an online fundraiser, which raised $100,000 and was enough to provide documentation and passage to Egypt for weaver Hussam Zaqout, his wife, children and nephews.

Mjalli was named a BBC 100 Woman in 2024.
