= Olaf Tveitmoe =

American labor leader (1865–1923)

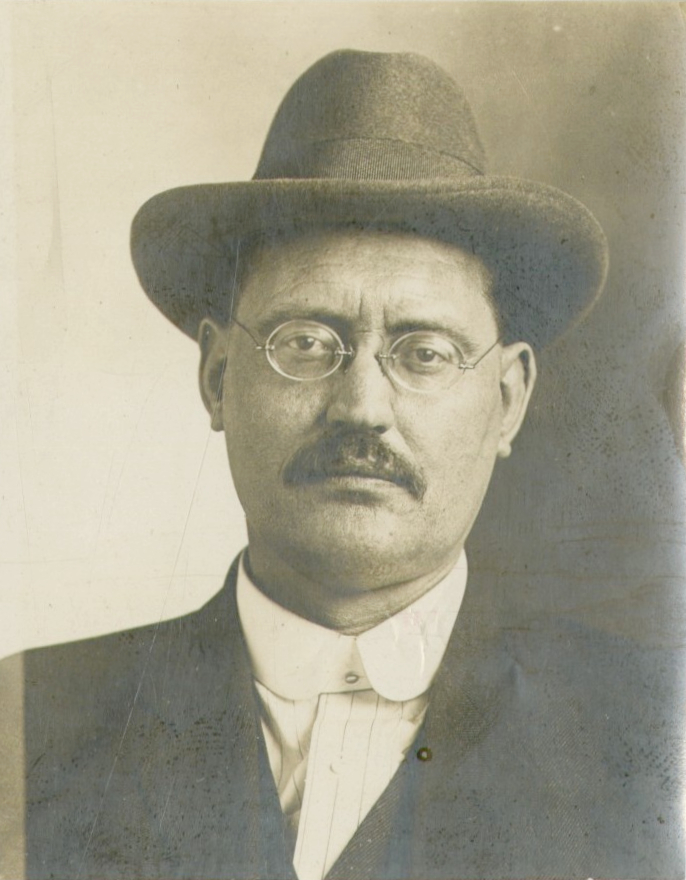
- Tveitmoe's Leavenworth Penitentiary mugshot, January 1, 1913

Member of the San Francisco Board of Supervisors
- In office January 11, 1907 – January 8, 1908
- Appointed by: Eugene Schmitz
- Preceded by: George F. Duffy
- Succeeded by: Ralph McLeran

Personal details
- Born: December 7, 1865 Valdres, Oppland, Norway
- Died: March 19, 1923 (aged 57) Santa Cruz, California, U.S.
- Party: Union Labor
- Spouse: Ingeborg Ødegaard (m. 1889)
- Children: 6
- Education: St. Olaf's School
- Occupation: Labor leader, newspaper editor
- Known for: Asiatic Exclusion League; Organized Labor

Olaf Anders Tveitmoe (December 7, 1865 – March 19, 1923) was a Norwegian-born American teacher, newspaper editor, and labor leader. Tveitmoe was a leading trade union functionary for the construction industry in the state of California for the first two decades of the 20th century. He was the founding editor of the weekly newspaper Organized Labor, which he edited for 20 years. He is best remembered for tangential trade union activity as the founder and president from 1904 to 1912 of the Asiatic Exclusion League, a political organization which sought to bolster American domestic wage levels by restricting immigration from Japan, China, and Korea.

== Early life ==
Olaf Anders Tveitmoe was born at Valdres in Oppland, Norway. He emigrated to the United States in 1882, settling in Holden Township, Goodhue County, Minnesota, where he worked variously as a farmhand. He entered a college preparatory program at St. Olaf's School (today's St. Olaf College) in the fall of 1886, gaining admission to the college program at St. Olaf's. Tveitmoe's college career proved to be short-lived, however, as he dropped out of the program in the 30th week of a 36-week program during his Freshman year.

Tveitmoe's Minnesota State Prison mugshot, April 20, 1894

In 1894, Tveitmoe was arrested, tried, and convicted of forgery after purchasing an interest in The Crookston Tribune, a newspaper connected with the Farmers' Alliance, using a promissory note with a forged signature. He was sentenced to 18 months of hard labor at the Minnesota State Prison in Stillwater in April, but was pardoned that December by governor Knute Nelson.

Later, Tveitmoe moved to the Pacific Coast, settling first in the state of Oregon, where in 1898 he was instrumental in organizing a utopian socialist communal colony. Located near the town of Toledo in Lincoln County, Oregon and named after popular socialist novelist Edward Bellamy, the Bellamy Colony briefly engaged in agricultural activity and petty manufacturing before failing to gain economic critical mass and failing.

== Trade union career ==
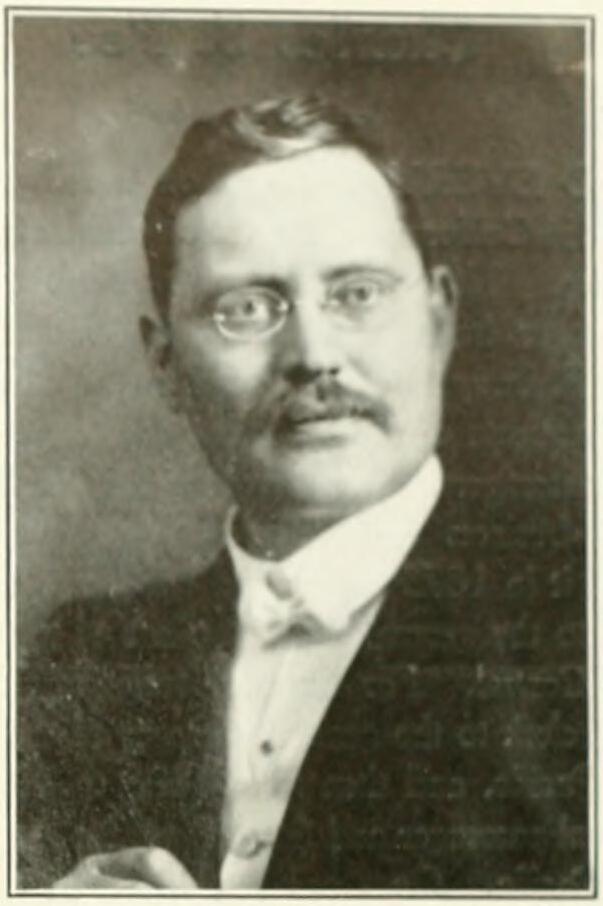
Tveitmoe c. 1912

In 1897 Tveitmoe moved from Oregon to San Francisco, California. There he began work in the building industry, gaining election as president of the local Cement Workers' Union in 1898. He remained in that position until 1900, when he was elected recording and corresponding secretary of the San Francisco Building Trades Council. Tveitmoe added the position of secretary of the California Building Trades Council to his resume in 1901 and he would retain both of these positions until 1922, the year before his death.

In 1903 Tveitmoe helped to organize a new national union of cement workers, the American Brotherhood of Cement Workers, of which he served as the first secretary-treasurer from 1903 to 1904. Despite his new role as a trade union functionary, Tveitmoe remained involved in journalism as editor of the weekly newspaper Organized Labor from 1900 until 1920. In this role he became the right-hand man of P. H. McCarthy, chief of the San Francisco Building Trades Council and the controversial mayor of San Francisco from 1910 to 1912. Tveitmoe briefly served as a national trade union official, being chosen in 1911 as the vice president of the Building Trades Department of the American Federation of Labor. He was tried for involvement in a five-year nationwide campaign of dynamite bombing and found guilty in 1912, but ultimately acquitted upon appeal in 1914.

== Political career ==
On January 11, 1907, Tveitmoe was appointed to the San Francisco Board of Supervisors by Mayor Eugene Schmitz. Despite being considered a loyalist, however, Tveitmoe immediately refused to attend Abe Ruef's "caucus meetings," rumored to be where the Union Labor boss directed his men on how to vote. Tveitmoe still supported Schmitz for the Union Labor nomination in 1907 against reformist challenger Michael Casey. He also opposed the San Francisco graft trials, and in retaliation Fremont Older's San Francisco Bulletin published the details of his 1894 arrest.

=== Anti-Asian Exclusion League ===
In March 1905, concerned by the prospect of unrestricted immigration from the populous low wage countries of Asia into the United States and its potential impact upon wage rates, the Labor Council of San Francisco launched a campaign against further Japanese immigration into the country, with Tveitmoe placed in the leading role. This was followed on May 7, 1905 with a mass meeting at Metropolitan Hall in San Francisco chaired by Tveitmoe, at which was established the Japanese and Korean Exclusion League. In 1907 this organization changed its name to the Asian Exclusion League, with Tveitmoe remaining head of this organization until 1912.

== Personal life and death ==
Tveitmoe with his wife Ingeborg and children, Angelo Sakarias Ingemann and Ingeborg Evangeline, 1893

In the spring of 1889, Tveitmoe was married to a fellow émigré from Valdres, Ingeborg Ødegaard. The first of the couple's six children would be born in May 1891.

Tveitmoe died in Santa Cruz, California. He was 57 years old at the time of his death.

== Works ==
- Olaf Tveitmoe, "Bellamy Beamings" Industrial Freedom [Edison, WA], whole no. 40 (Feb. 4, 1899), pg. 2.
