= Organized Labor =

San Francisco-based trades union newspaper continually published since 1900

- Remember Your Friends; As Well As Your Enemies
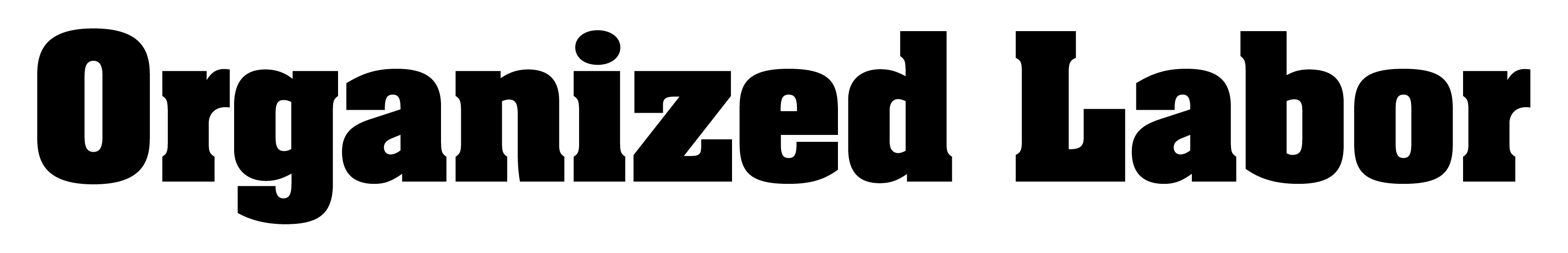
- Organized Labor masthead; in use since 2025
- Type: Monthly newspaper
- Format: Tabloid
- Owner: San Francisco Building and Construction Trades Council
- Founder: Olaf Tveitmoe
- Founded: February 3, 1900; 126 years ago
- Language: English
- Headquarters: 825 Van Ness Ave., #301; San Francisco, CA
- Circulation: 12,000 (as of July 2025)
- ISSN: 0199-6452
- Website: orglabornews.org

Organized Labor (OL) is a union-affiliated newspaper published by the San Francisco Building and Construction Trades Council (SFBCTC), a regional labor council affiliated with NABTU and the AFL–CIO. Founded in 1900, it is one of the oldest labor publications in the United States and has served as a voice for building and construction trades in the San Francisco Bay Area for over a century.

Contemporary unionists often take for granted the rather boring, thin tabloids that arrive by mail in return for a portion of their dues. In contrast, [Organized Labor] was a wide-ranging forum of opinion and news that mobilized each local building union in California to support the decisions and ambitions of the San Francisco leadership.

— Michael Kazin, in Barons of Labor, published 1989

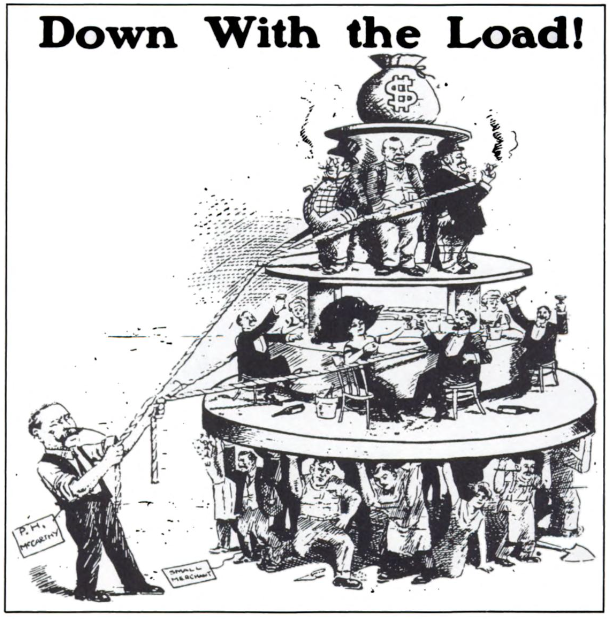
Political cartoon featuring labor leader and 29th mayor of San Francisco P. H. McCarthy, published in a 1911 edition of Organized Labor

== History ==
Organized Labor was established in 1900, during a period of growing labor activism and union consolidation in the United States. The newspaper was founded by labor leader Olaf Tveitmoe and was created to support the mission of the San Francisco Building and Construction Trades Council, which itself was founded in 1896 to unify the city’s various building trades unions. The paper began as a weekly publication and was billed as the "official paper of the state and local building trades councils of California."

By 1915, Organized Labor's circulation had increased to 50,000. Its wide audience reach led Tveitmoe, who held dual posts as the paper's editor and as the secretary of the local building trades council (BTC) in San Francisco during this time, to state: “The history of this paper is connected so closely with the growth and progress of the BTCs and the Union movement of this State that the two cannot be separated."

American historian Michael Kazin writes in his book Barons of Labor: The San Francisco Building Trades and Union Power in the Progressive Era:

But the editor fashioned his journal to appeal beyond the boundaries of the construction trades. For its first few years, Organized Labor’s board of directors included officers from the San Francisco Typographers’, Cigarmakers’ and Musicians’ unions as well as from the BTC. Tveitmoe wrote and solicited articles on a gamut of workers and industries: coal miners, streetcar strikes, child labor in southern textile mills, British longshoremen, a general strike in Sweden. He wove together quotations from Karl Marx, the Bible, Henry George, and his countryman Henrik Ibsen into hyperbolic editorials on subjects from the Golden Rule to the imminent and bloody downfall of world capitalism. These writings, while perhaps demonstrating “the passion of a frustrated intellectual life,” were designed to inspire workers to dedicate themselves to class-conscious activity.

Kazin further writes:

For men outside the Bay Area who usually had no other source of information friendly to the labor movement, the sweeping prose of Tveitmoe and regular news of world events may have been a significant influence. In its sophisticated home city, however, the weekly was not always a popular medium.

=== Racial Exclusion and Nativism ===
During the early 20th century, Organized Labor promoted the racially exclusionary views of its leadership, particularly Tveitmoe, who had a broad influence over the newspaper's editorial positions as well as the policies of the San Francisco building trades council. Tveitmoe, a Norwegian immigrant and prominent labor figure, used the publication as a platform to advocate for anti-Asian immigration policies and the exclusion of nonwhite workers from construction trades unions.

Under Tveitmoe’s direction, Organized Labor regularly published editorials that opposed the presence of Chinese, Japanese, and Filipino workers in the labor market. The newspaper described Asian immigrants as threats to the "standard of living of the white working man" and called for stricter immigration laws, including the rigorous enforcement of the Chinese Exclusion Act and backing the Gentlemen's Agreement of 1907.

Tveitmoe also played a key role in the Asiatic Exclusion League, an influential coalition of labor unions and nativist groups formed in San Francisco in 1905. The league's activities and messaging were regularly promoted in the pages of Organized Labor, which served as a de facto mouthpiece for the movement.

While such exclusionary views were common in the labor movement at the time—particularly on the West Coast, as demonstrated by the Pacific Coast race riots of 1907—Organized Labor's rhetoric and influence helped institutionalize racial barriers within the construction trades. Membership in many San Francisco building trades unions remained closed to nonwhite workers into the mid-20th century.

== See also ==
- List of the oldest newspapers
