= Palestinian thobe =

Traditional women's long tunic

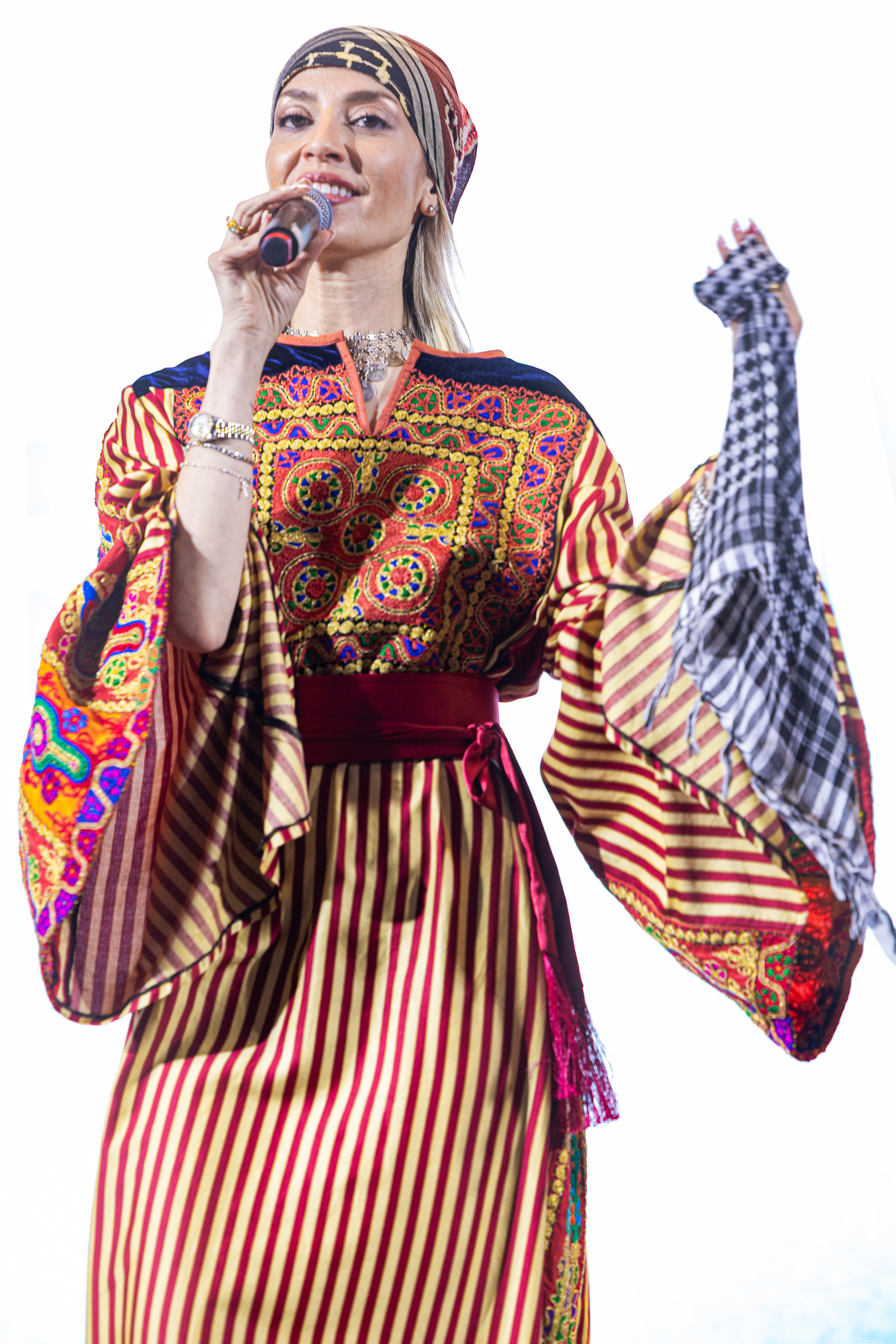
Palestinian singer pictured wearing a thobe

The Palestinian thobe (Arabic: ثوبة, romanized: thawba; Palestinian Arabic: ثوبة or توبة, romanized: tōbe) is the traditional Palestinian woman's long tunic. It is considered the national dress of Palestinian women. It is embroidered with tatreez patterns, with different colours and patterns signifying various aspects of the wearer's social position and most importantly its unique village, town or city. The Palestinian Museum in Birzeit has curated a collection of thobes as an example of Palestinian material heritage.

== History ==
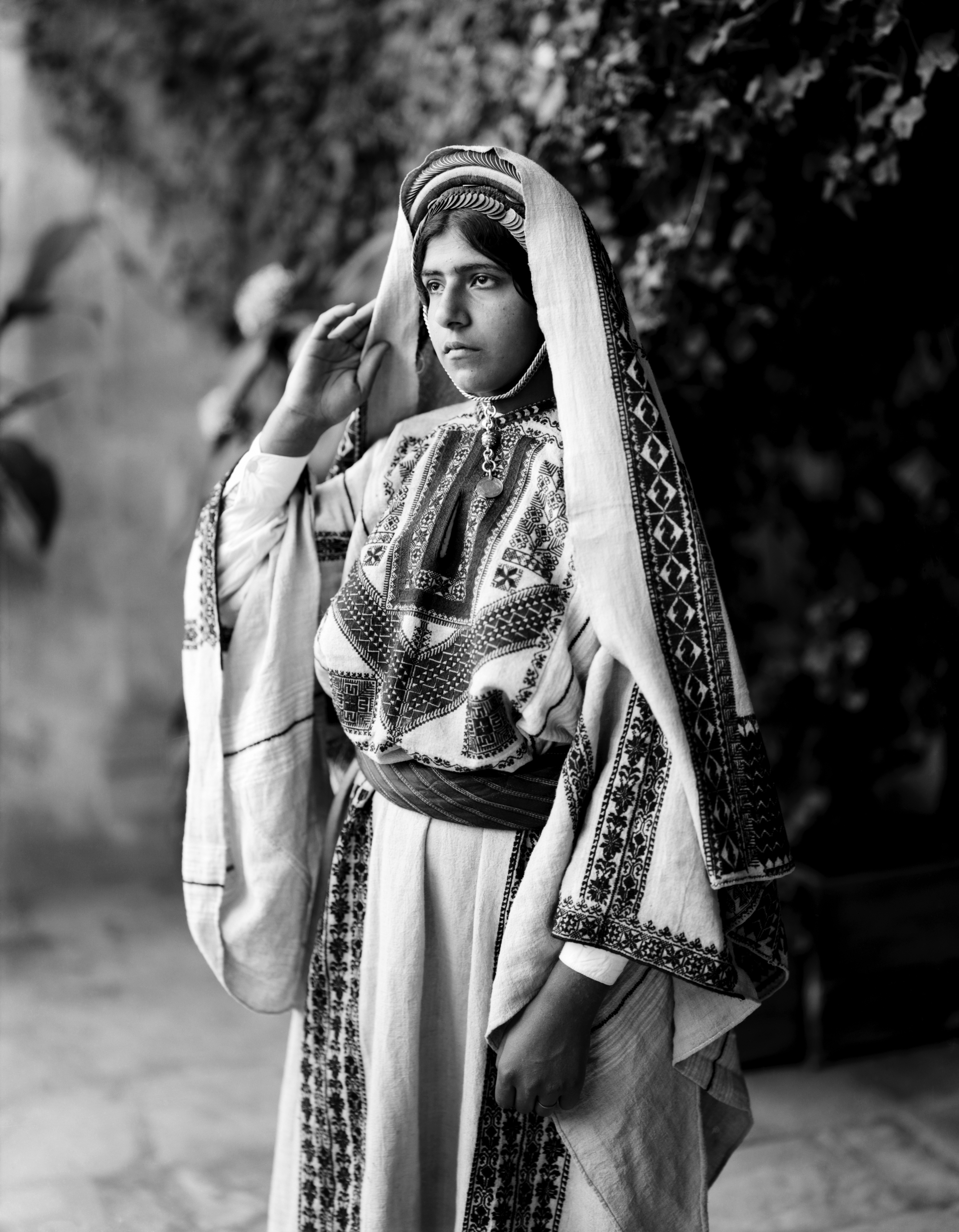
Woman from Ramallah, c. 1898–1914

The Al Qarara Cultural Museum in the Gaza Strip, which held a collection of these garments, was destroyed in an explosion as a result of an Israeli attack in October 2023, part of an offensive that reportedly deliberately targeted civilian homes and mosques in the vicinity.

== Cultural significance ==
Rashida Tlaib, a Democratic member of the United States House of Representatives from Michigan and the first Palestinian-American woman elected to that body, wore a thobe to her swearing-in ceremony on January 3, 2019. This inspired a number of Palestinian and Palestinian-American women to share pictures on social media with the hashtag #TweetYourThobe. Like the ghutra, thobes were also popular during the 2022 FIFA World Cup in Qatar.
