= Tatreez =

Traditional Palestinian embroidery

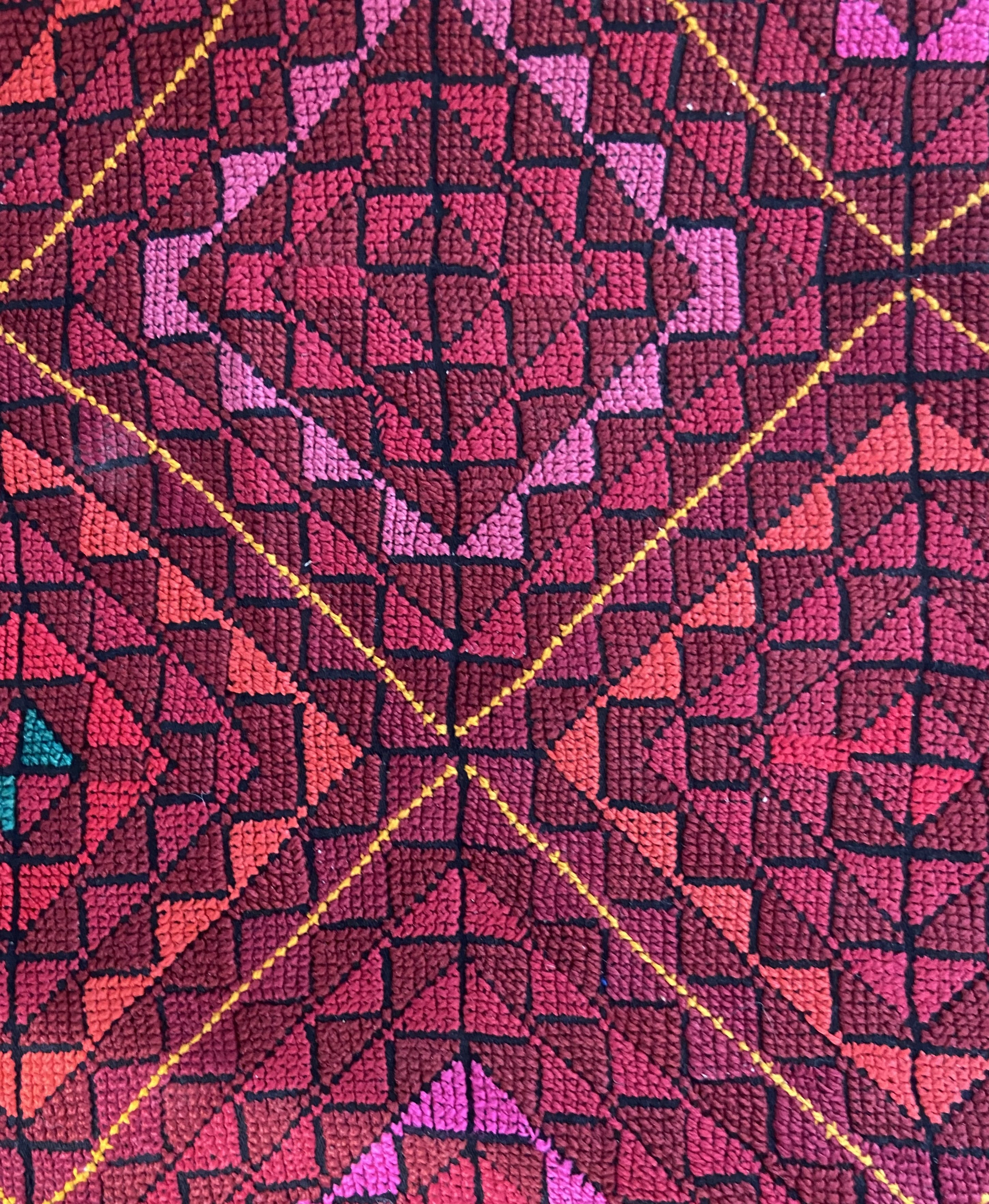
Embroidery from Beersheba Dress (Palestinian thobe) early in the 20th century. The red embroidery in Beersheba was worn by married women while the blue by unmarried women/widows.

Tatreez (Levantine Arabic: تَطْرِيز, romanized: taṭrīz) is a form of traditional Palestinian embroidery, practiced both in Palestine and among Palestinian diaspora communities. The contemporary form of tatreez is often dated back to the 19th century, while the style of cross-stitch embroidery called fallāḥi ('peasant-style') has been practiced amongst Arab communities in the Mediterranean for centuries. The embroidery is particularly associated with embellishments on traditional dress like the thobe, with the motifs and colors representing regional identity and social relationships. Tatreez is commonly used on garments and includes a variety of symbols, including birds, trees, and flowers. The craft, originally practiced in rural areas of Palestine but now common across the Palestinian diaspora, was recognized by UNESCO in 2021 as an important intangible cultural heritage. According to Reem Kassis, this style of embroidery in particular is often celebrated as one of the most rich and exquisite.

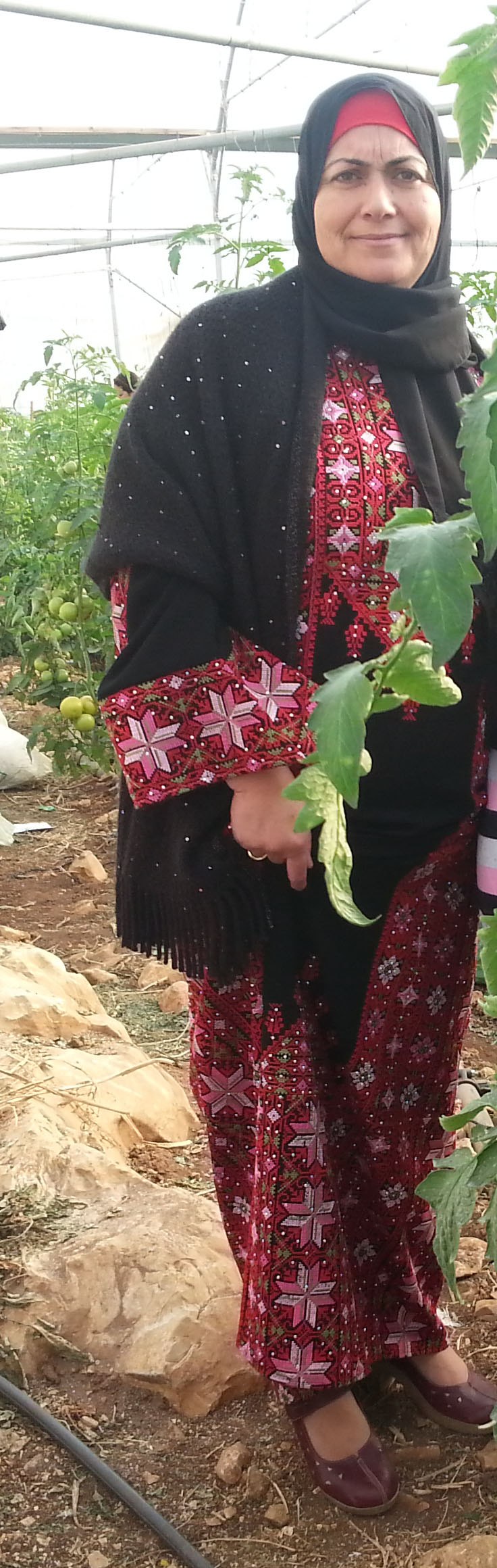
A Palestinian woman wearing an embroidered dress associated with rural regions of Palestine, recognized as an integral part of Palestinian folk heritage and traditionally worn during special occasions and celebrations

Historically, each village in Palestine had distinct tatreez patterns, with unique designs telling stories about the local people, legends, animals and plants, and beliefs. The different styles of tatreez have become less distinct and have continued to evolve with the diaspora. The context of Palestinian displacement and oppression after 1948 gave the practice of tatreez further sociopolitical significance as a way to embody, share, and preserve cultural heritage. Tatreez patterns were passed down by Palestinian women to subsequent generations as a "language" with which they could "tell their story of resistance and existence under Israeli military occupation."

== Origins ==
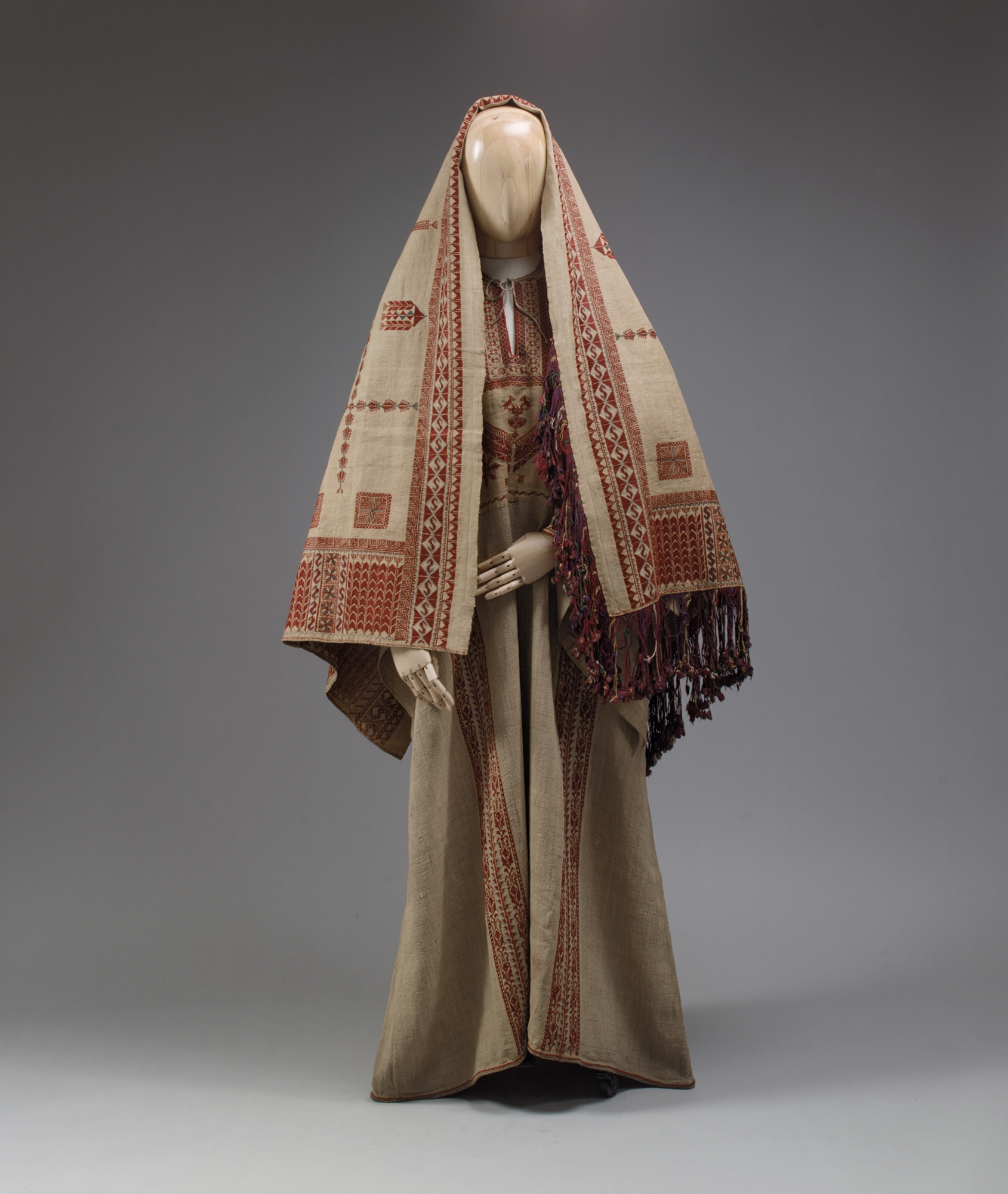
Village woman's dress (thobe) from Ramallah, 19th century

Hanan K. Munayyer, a scholar of Palestinian dress, considers one of the first examples of Tatreez-like embroidery to be a fragment of geometric silk cross-stitch embroidery from 11th-century Alexandria. Dresses found in a 1283 CE burial in Lebanon represent the earliest intact garments with Tatreez embroidery, and strongly resemble the regional dress of Ramallah.

Many popular Tatreez motifs mimic elements of Arab architectural and mosaic design. For example, the cup and acanthus leaf motif is often found in stone carvings.

Historically, the materials used for Tatreez embroidery were from the local area of the embroiderer. Silk was cultivated in Palestine from the sixth to the nineteenth century in order to make the embroidery thread. Before industrialization, the fabric was woven by men in home looms. Plant dyes, such as indigo or madder, were used to color the embroidery thread.

== Terminology ==
The cross-stitch embroidery style is known as fallaḥi, from the Arabic word denoting a rural person, fallaḥ. This is the most common embroidery style throughout Palestine, but certain regions are known for idiosyncratic techniques. Bethlehem embroidery usually uses a satin stitch known as tahiri, and may incorporate metallic thread embroidery (qasab) because the thobe (or dress) material was often finely woven and unsuitable for fallaḥi. Embroidered aspects of a thobe were often decorated before being assembled. The parts of a thobe that would often be embroidered include the chest panel (qabba) which has patterns and colors that vary from region to region and identify the wearer easily. Other commonly embroidered areas of the thobe include the rada "shoulder piece", side skirt panels (benayiq), the front of the skirt (hiijer), and the lower back panel (shinyar).

== Prominent motifs ==
A completed piece of tatreez comprises many motifs. These motifs each carry symbolic meanings, telling a story through textile. Different motifs are passed down through generations, becoming identifiers of particular villages, towns, regions, or even families. The variation reflects the deep connection between tatreez and Palestinian heritage - motifs depict the environment, history, and even daily life of Palestinians.

Common motifs include the following:

Tree of life: Also known as the cypress, this motif is one of the most popular, seen across regions. Symbolizing longevity, resilience, and stability, the cypress tree is often depicted in symmetrical patterns, reflecting its persistent role in the natural environment of Palestine.

Palm tree: Another common motif is the palm tree, though it is seen most frequently in relation to thobes from Ramallah. The palm tree is reflective of the Palestinian natural landscape, it symbolizes fertility and life - as is the nature of Palestine.

Pasha's Tent: A motif related to Palestinian history is the Khemet el Basha or "Pasha's tent". The Pasha's Tent is associated with a high-ranking official from the Ottoman Empire.

Star of Bethlehem: as its name alludes to, this motif is popular in the region of Bethlehem, communicating messages of love and family with its ties to Astarte, the Canaanite goddess of fertility.

Border motifs: Bordering elements also play a significant role in the symbolic nature of Tatreez and Palestinian thobes. Often working to frame larger motifs, or the edges of a garment borders depict feathers, roses, soap, triangles, and toothed lines.

Each completed thobe, with a tapestry of motifs, is a direct reflection of the personal circumstances of the artist, displaying social and marital status, wealth, village of origin, and even personality.

== Regional differences ==
In each region, the embroidery serves as a form of aesthetic and cultural expression and carries deep social significance, reflecting the community's identity and traditions. For instance, In the Northern regions like Bethlehem and Ramallah, the embroidery is distinguished by its intricate motifs and the use of luxurious materials, reflecting the historical and religious importance of the area. Bethlehem is especially well known for its extravagant use of silver and gold threads in wedding attire, representing prestige and wealth. Ramallah's embroidery features detailed geometric and floral patterns, often adorning handwoven white linen used in traditional dresses, marking celebrations and significant life events.

On the other hand, southern areas such as Gaza City and Hebron exhibit distinct styles. Although Gazan dresses are simpler and represent everyday life's practical needs, they are exquisitely adorned with vibrant embroidery down the sleeves and hems. Hebron, known for its vivid cross-stitch designs on thick linen, exhibits a strong aesthetic with rich reds and greens that represent a bond with the land and local traditions. In addition to adding beauty to the clothing, the tatreez of each region is a form of identity and expression passed down through the generations, reflecting the artistry and resilience of Palestinian culture.

== Tatreez after the Nakba ==
The Nakba (Arabic for catastrophe) in 1948 saw the displacement of over 700,000 Palestinians. The practice of tatreez was disrupted and countless treasured works were lost as the vast majority of Palestinians became refugees. Traditionally embroidered dresses were rarely produced in the 1950s as Palestinians were forced to live and work in "utterly different political exigencies" and in "difficult environments."

After Palestinians were torn away from almost every aspect of their everyday lives, tatreez, like other routine practices, became something to preserve. The process of "heritagization" turned smaller aspects of Palestinian life into hallmarks of their existence, and resistance. Tatreez also became a necessary part of the economy for refugees- the practice was commodified as women sold their art to support their families. Many women's organizations cropped up around this time, centered around giving women the supplies to take back their craft and their lives.

== Tatreez after the 1967 Six-Day War ==
A second tatreez revival occurred in the 1970s and 1980s, after the Six Day War. Commercialization of tatreez increased, the market drawing international attention to Palestine. At this point, practicing and teaching tatreez became a revolutionary act. The Palestine Liberation Organization even established tatreez workshops in refugee camps. "In short, in the 1970s and 80s, people extended resistance and the political struggle to culture and other nonpolitical domains, like the domestic sphere, that were less exposed to immediate Israeli repression: This culture resistance was imbued with folklore." Embroidery gave Palestinian women work, power, and identity: though at this time the art was no longer just women's work. It is now not only a symbol for Palestinian heritage but a new form of mobilization and activism.

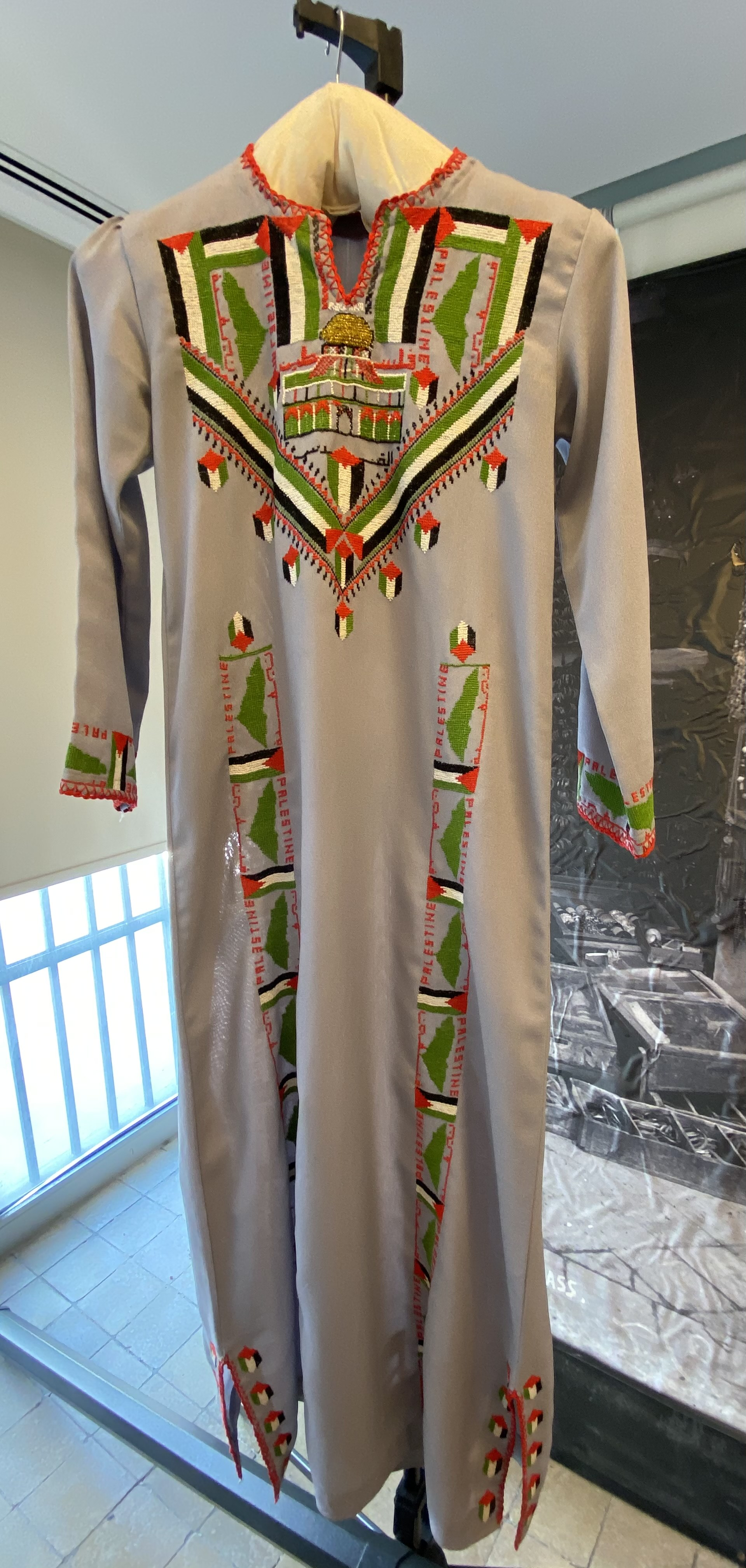
Palestinian "Intifada Dress" or "Flag Dress"

== Tatreez and the Intifadas ==
Throughout the First Intifada, nationalist art and imagery had a strong influence on resistance, and vice versa. This escalated Israeli censorship of Palestinian art, to the extent that the colors of the flag itself were not permitted to be shown in public. Tatreez, along with other tasks traditionally performed by women, was not only publicized but politicized into a format for nationalist rebellion. Using tatreez to display the Palestinian flag on thobes became a popular form of resistance for Palestinian women. These dresses came to be known as "intifada dresses" or "flag dresses". Thobes became an excellent media for the Palestinian flag after it was banned in public places. Women could wear their "intifada dresses" in their homes or other private places, and even if displayed in public at a protest, the dresses could not be removed off their bodies.

== Tatreez today ==
Since 2020, Yasmeen Mjalli's fashion brand Nöl Collective has used tatreez embroidery and majdalawi fabric.

In some diaspora communities, Palestinians have formed tatreez circles and gatherings to keep connected with the craft. Members of some circles describe the initiatives as a way to connect with fellow diaspora and share lived experiences in the wake of the genocide in Gaza.

== See also ==
- Palestinian handicrafts
- Palestinian traditional costumes
