= Avi Sasson =

Israeli academic

- אברהם (אבי) ששון
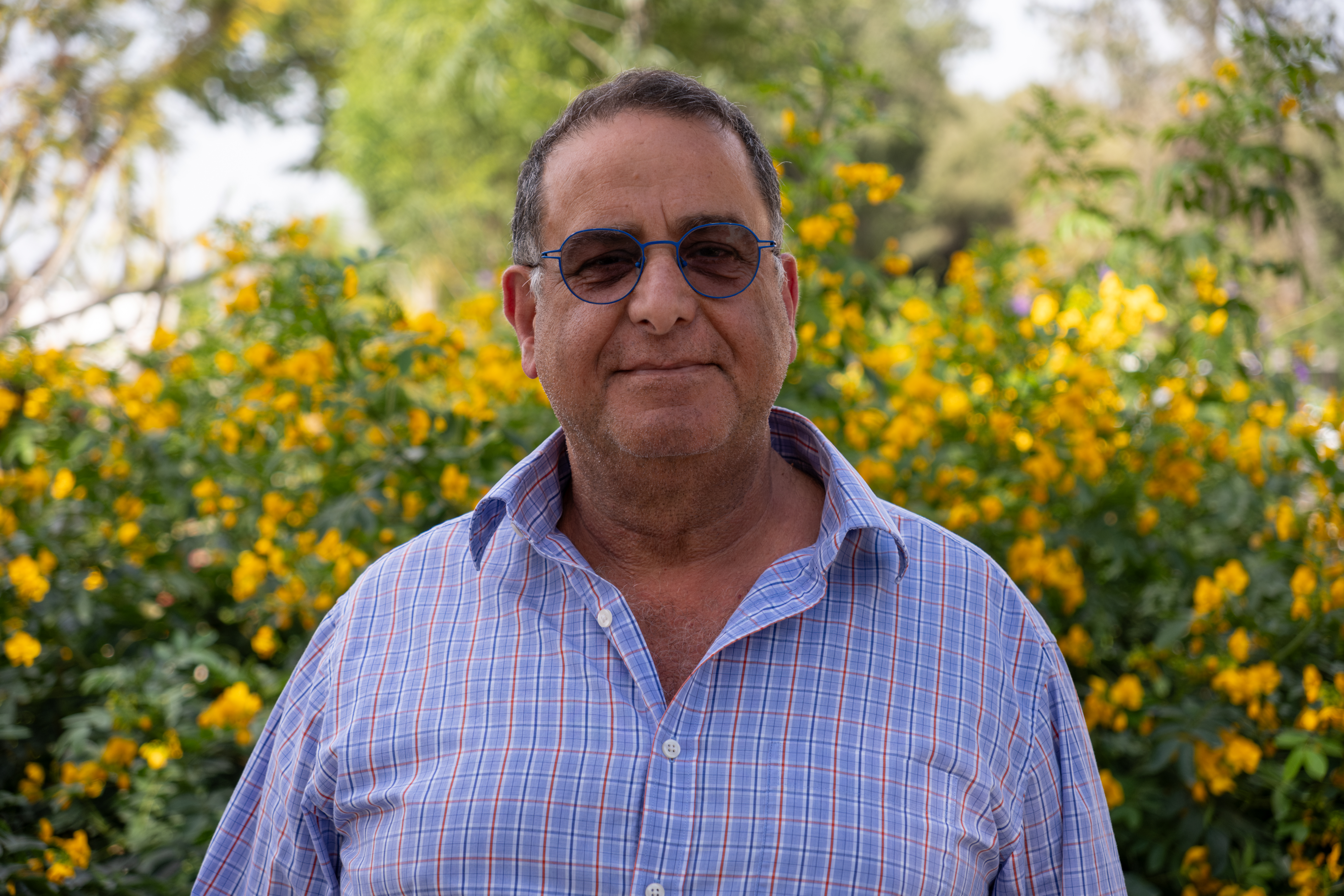
- Sasson, 2026
- Known for: Survey of Palestinian orchard houses, Historic preservation survey around Rosh HaAyin, Community projects in Majdal 'Asqalan
- Scientific career
- Fields: Israel Studies, Water Irrigation Technologies, Material Culture, Popular Religion, Building Technologies, Stone-Lime Industries
- Workplaces: Ashkelon Academic College

Avraham (Avi) Sasson (Hebrew: אברהם (אבי) ששון) is an Israeli Associate Professor and chair of the Israel Studies Department at Ashkelon Academic College, Israel.

== Career ==
Sasson specializes in water irrigation technologies, material culture, popular religion, building technologies and the stone-lime industries in the southern Levant.

According to reports in Haaretz and TheMarker, Sasson undertook the survey of Palestinian orchard houses (Arabic: Bayyarat) in Tel Aviv. According to another report by Israeli news site Ynet, in 2007 Sasson initiated a historic preservation survey around Rosh HaAyin, documenting 150 historic sites, including a World War II British Armed Forces camp. Sasson has participated in community projects to protect Majdal 'Asqalan's architectural heritage, protesting damages to the town's main mosque.

According to later reports by local historian and blogger Yoav Avinion, Sasson participated in the study of Majdal Yaba's stone industries in Mandatory Palestine. Haaretz also mentioned that Sasson worked as a consultant on major urban renewal projects, including in Gush Dan, Gedera and Ashkelon.

In September 2023, Sasson published an edited volume commemorating 70 years to the establishment of Sderot, near the Gaza Strip, just a few days before Palestinian militants overran Sderot during the opening offensive of the Gaza war. Soon thereafter, he led Zionist commemoration activities recounting the story of Samson and the Philistines near Samson's hometown of Tsor'a.

== Selected works ==
- Safrai, Zeev, and Avi Sasson. Quarrying and Quarries in the Land of Israel. Elkana (2001).
- Sasson, Avi. "Historical geography of the Palestine southern coastal plain in the late Ottoman period–the Ashkelon region as a case study." Middle Eastern Studies 55.6 (2019): 974-1004.
- Sasson, Avi, and Eliav Taub. "The Israel Antiquities Authority and Atra Kadisha." Israel Affairs 27.3 (2021): 609-623.
- Sasson, Avi. "The historical archaeology of the Jewish stone industry in the twentieth century-Migdal Zedek (Majdal Yaba) as a center of the stone industry." International Journal of Historical Archaeology 23 (2019): 609-627.
- Sasson, Avi. "The lime-burning plant at the Ali-Muntar Hill in Gaza." Bulletin of the Anglo-Israel Archaeological Society 18 (2000): 83-103.
- Sasson, Avraham. "Spiny Burnet as Industrial Fuel in Historical Palestine: Ecology and ethnography." Landscapes 22.1 (2021): 57-79.
