= Late Ottoman period =

The Late Ottoman period (c. 1750–1918) is the archaeologically- and historically-defined periodisation of territories which came under the control of the Ottoman Empire and its dependencies, primarily in the Middle East, North Africa, the Caucasus and the Balkans. Accordingly, the spatial extent of the area covered by the definition was dynamic, getting smaller as time went on. This period is also distinct for the sources recording its history.

As an analytical construct, it overlaps with the later stages of the Ottoman Empire, from about 1750 until its dissolution after the end of the First World War. This period was characterized with increased foreign, primarily European, intervention, outside invasions, the Tanzimat reforms, social modernization, economic globalization, improvements in communications and transportation infrastructure, and political change.

According to Roy Marom and Itamar Taxel, the separation, in academic discourses, of the Late Ottoman and post-Ottoman, Mandate periods "represents an artificial break in the history of the countryside that [...] overshadows the social, demographic, economic, cultural, and local-political continuities, attested in historical and archaeological evidence."
