= Dor, Israel =

Moshav in northern Israel

Dor: דור (Hebrew)
- Moshav
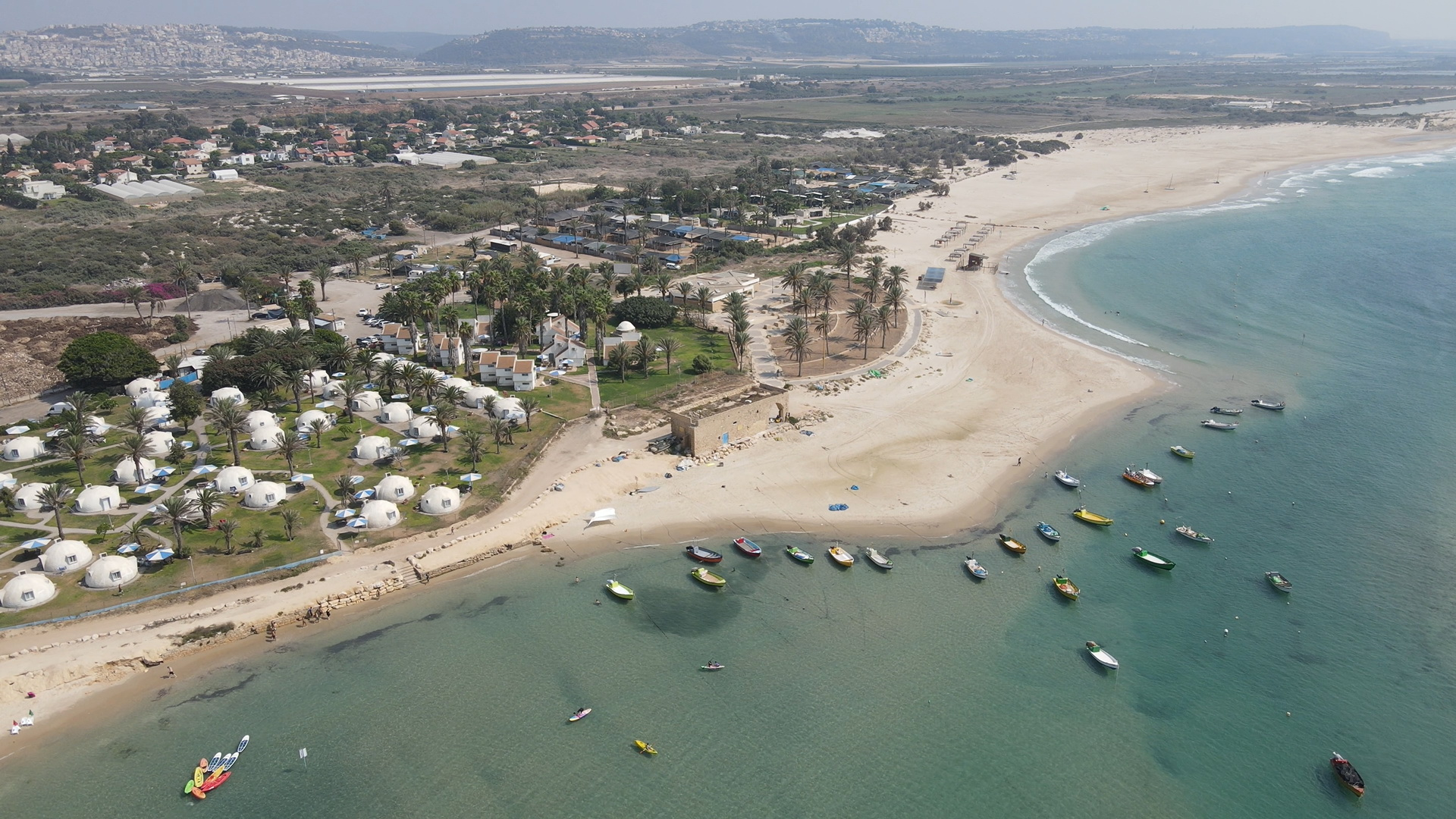
- Dor beach

- Location within Haifa region of Israel Location within Israel
- Coordinates: 32°36′27″N 34°55′19″E
- Country: Israel
- District: Haifa
- Subdistrict: Hadera
- Council: Hof HaCarmel
- Affiliation: Moshavim Movement
- Founded: 2000 BCE (Tel Dor); 838 CE (Tantura); 1949 (Israeli moshav)
- Population (2024): 504

Dor (Hebrew: דור) is a moshav in northern Israel. Located near Zikhron Ya'akov, it falls under the jurisdiction of Hof HaCarmel Regional Council. In 2024 it had a population of 504.

Named after the ancient Phoenician city of Dor, the moshav was established in June 1948 on land near the recently depopulated Palestinian village of al-Tantura in the wake of the Tantura massacre.

== History ==
=== Tel Dor ===
==== Bronze Age and Iron Age ====
The earliest remains at the Tel Dor site date back to the Canaanite period ending about 1200 BCE. Later, the Shkil tribe of sea raiders inhabited Tel Dor, as described in the letters of the Egyptian traveler Wen-Amon. The Phoenicians settled at Dor approximately 1100 BCE, and subsequently it became King Solomon's main port on the Mediterranean. Modern Dor was named after the ancient Phoenician city of Dor, which was inhabited by the tribe of Manasseh in the Israelite period. The city is mentioned in the Bible, in the Book of Joshua 17:11 and 1 Chronicles 7:29). The ancient city of Dor was situated on the excavated tell north of today's moshav, overlooking Kibbutz Nahsholim.

==== Roman period and later ====
Archaeologists have excavated Roman temples and mosaic floors, as well as stone-walled houses from the Hellenistic period, when the site was known as Dora. Artifacts of beautiful Roman and Greek bowls, plates, jugs and jewelry are displayed at the nearby museum. From the 4th to the 7th century CE, Dor served as a Bishopric, but the Byzantine church was later abandoned. The village of Tantura was established in the area during the Arab period.

== Modern times ==
=== Moshav site ===
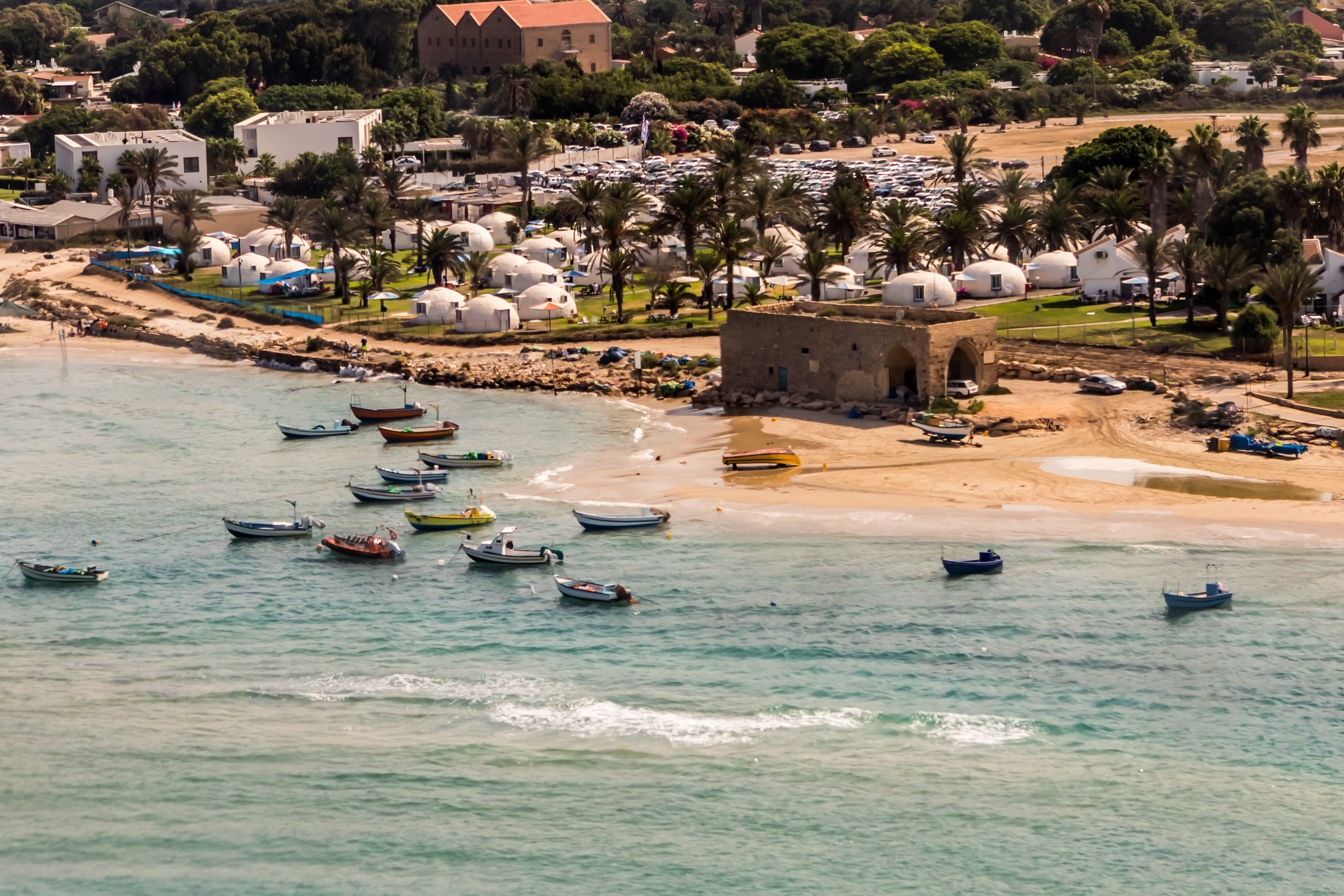
The mass grave from the 1948 Tantura massacre under the car park behind the beach.

The modern moshav was established in 1949 by Jewish immigrants from Greece, who were later joined by Jewish refugees from Iraq on land near the forcibly depopulated Palestinian village of Tantura, east of the old village site. Today, according to a report in the newspaper Haaretz, a car park for the beaches of Dor and neighboring Nahsholim contains a mass grave from the 1948 Tantura massacre.
