= Ashkelon shipwrecks =

In 1998, an underwater survey conducted off the coast of Israel by the Israeli Antiquities Authority (IAA), discovered the wreckage of a Hellenistic or Early Roman ship. The ship is believed to have sunk in the 1st or 2nd century BC. The wreck is approximately 100 m off the coast of Ashkelon, Israel at a depth of around 3–4 m in the Mediterranean Sea. The city of Ashkelon was once a bustling trade port; however multiple ancient reports say that Ashkelon was a poor site for a port, citing the frequent storms and lack of a safe harbor.

== Excavation and artifacts ==
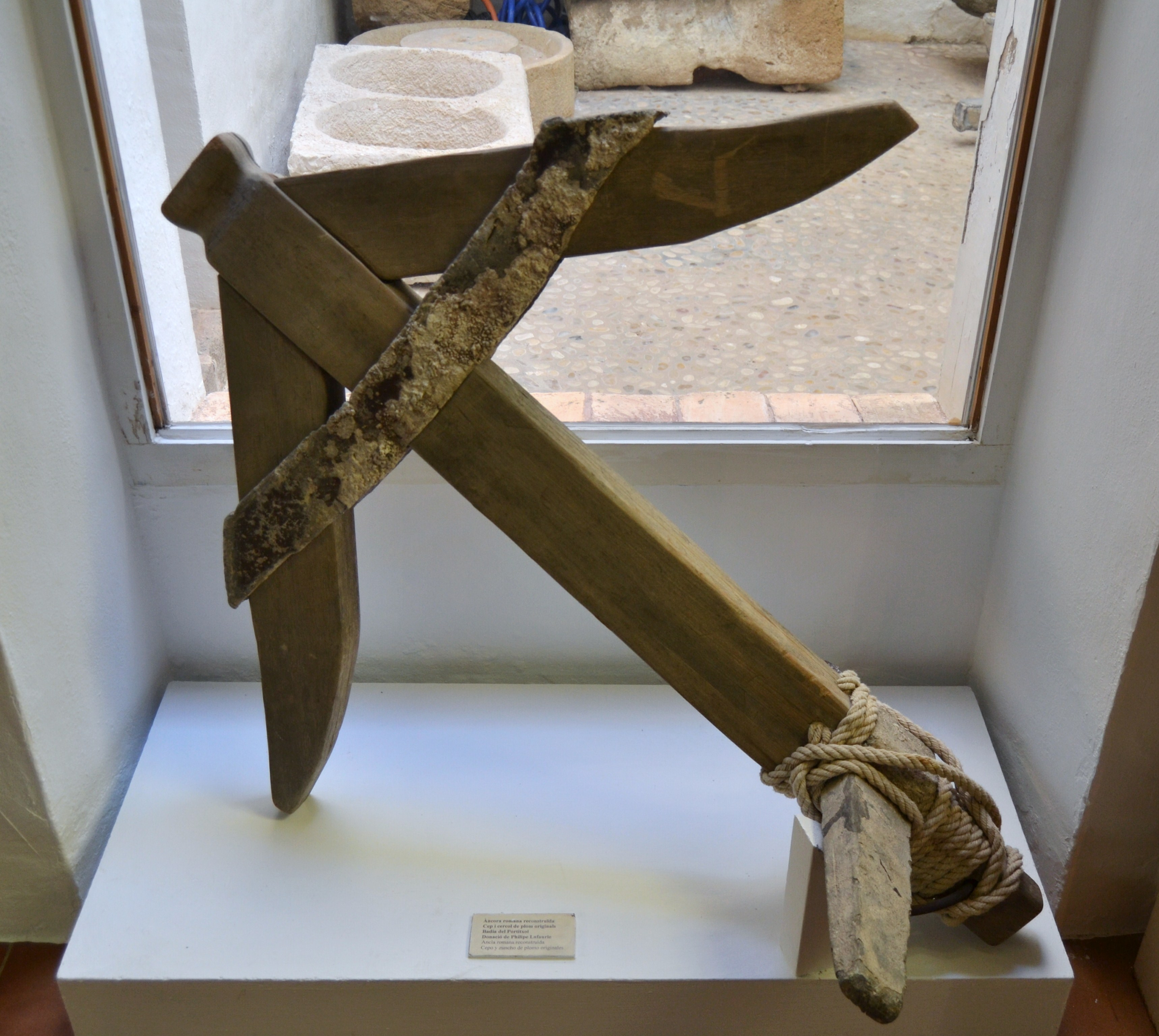
Example of a Roman ship anchor

The actual wooden frame of the ship has decayed but the majority of the heavy artifacts remain. Associated with the ship are 4 large iron anchors, copper-alloy nails (both used and unused), lead-sheathing pieces, lead fishing-net sinkers, three bronze balance-scales, bronze cooking ware, an oil lamp, incense shovel, bronze ladle, and one copper-alloy trumpet. Due to the lack of a main cargo among the wreckage, some scholars believe that the cargo would have been perishable.

=== Interpretation ===
The presence of the incense shovel and ladle lead some to believe that they were part of some form of ritual ceremony. This is supported by evidence of a Roman relief in which a sea captain is shown in front of an altar, praising his gods after a safe journey. The various lead weights are believed to be associated with fishing nets. The weights are very similar in form and function to those found on another Roman shipwreck located off the coast of Dor, Israel. The shipwreck has been dated to the 1st or 2nd century BC based on artifact typologies; no materials were found allowing radio-carbon dating.
