= Isaac Shoshan =

Israeli intelligence officer and spy (1924–2020)

Isaac Shoshan יצחק שושן
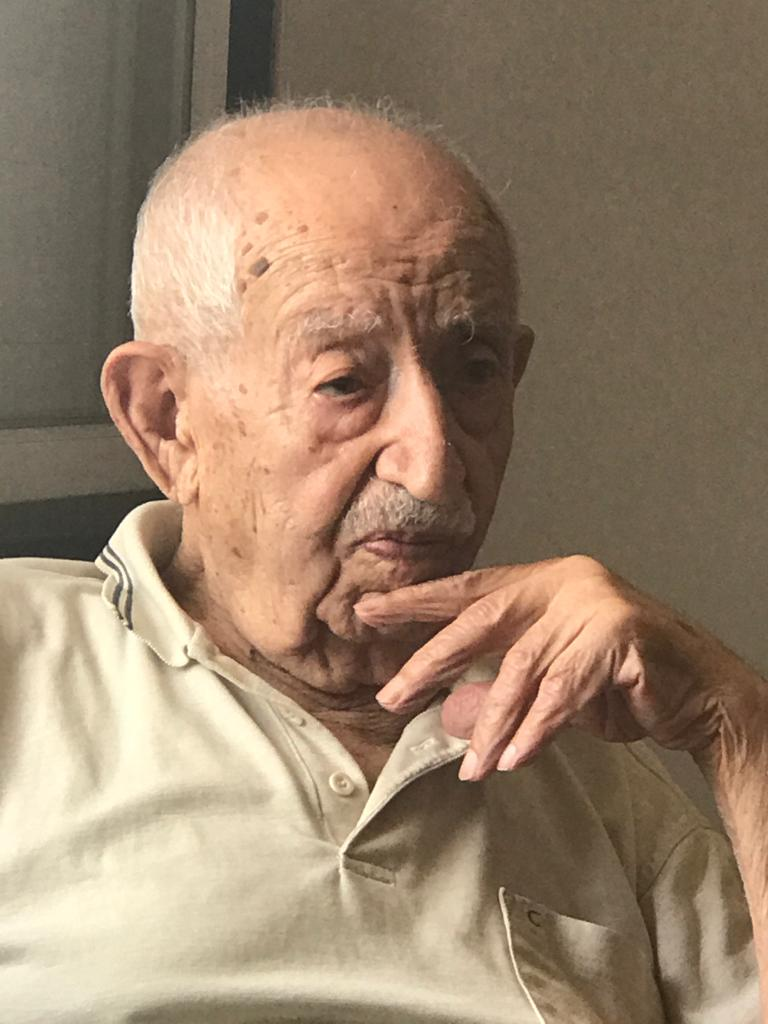
- Born: Isaac "Zaki" Shasho; 19 April 1924; Aleppo, Syria
- Died: 28 December 2020 (aged 96); Tel Aviv, Israel
- Citizenship: Israel
- Spouses: Yaffa (m. 1952; died 1970) Rachel (m. 1973)
- Children: Jacob, Eti
- Espionage activity
- Allegiance: Israel
- Agency: Palmach, Military Intelligence Directorate (Israel), Mossad
- Service years: 1945–1982

Isaac Shoshan (Hebrew: יצחק שושן; 19 April 1924 – 28 December 2020) was an Israeli intelligence officer, spy and "Mista'arev". Starting as an undercover operative in the "Arab Section" of the Palmach in Mandatory Palestine, he later became one of the founding members of Israel's Intelligence Community serving as an espionage agent, case officer and instructor in Aman (Israel's Military Intelligence Directorate) and eventually in the Mossad.

== Biography ==
Isaac Shoshan was born as Isaac Shasho, nicknamed "Zaki", in Aleppo, Syria to poor Jewish parents, Yaqoub Shasho and his wife Mazal. He studied at the Alliance Jewish school, and after school hours used to assist his father at his work as a school janitor. In his limited spare time, he was an active member of the Jewish Scouts movement.

In 1942, aged 18, he emigrated to Mandatory Palestine by sneaking illegally across the border with a group of Jewish youngsters, led by a border smuggler. He made his way to Tel Aviv where he settled in the Yemenite quarter of Kerem HaTeimanim and made a modest living working occasionally in the adjacent Carmel Market, in nearby agricultural farms and in a tin factory. He then moved to Jerusalem, staying with his elder sister Rachel who emigrated several years earlier, and worked there as assistant to his brother in-law carrying and selling fruits and vegetables throughout the streets of the city.

In 1943 Shoshan enlisted to a Hakhshara camp in Kibbutz Na'an, and in 1945 joined the Hakhshara camp of Kibbutz Gvat. That same year he was recruited to the Palmach alongside the other Hakhshara trainees.

=== Palmach activity ===
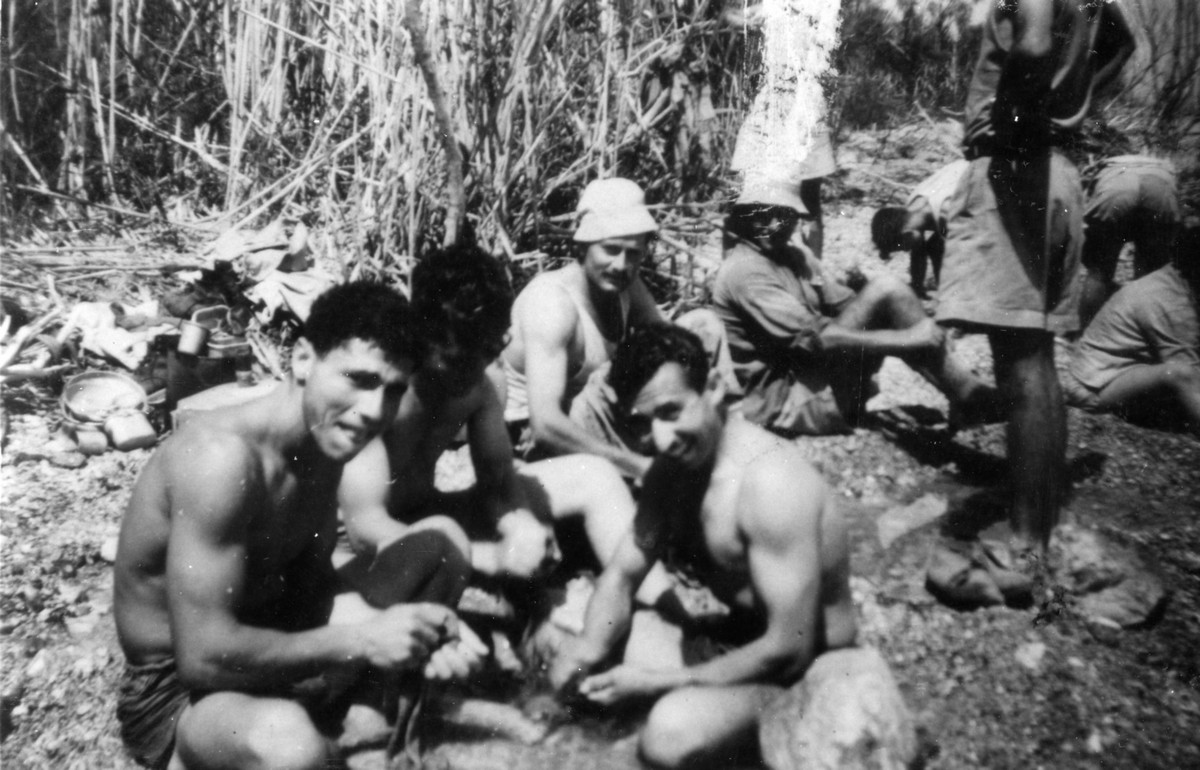
Members of Palmach "Arab Section", Isaac Shoshan in right foreground

Having become an active member of the Palmach and as a native Arabic speaker with the suitable background and appearance, Shoshan was found fit to join the Special Operations unit of the Mista'arvim, also known as the "Arab Section". He was based in Kibbutz Ein HaHoresh, where he underwent extensive training in intelligence gathering, undercover communications and explosives. Instruction also included thorough Quran studies, Islamic religion and culture, Sharia law, prayers, ritual purity and all other customs relevant for imposing as a Muslim Arab. As part of the training, trainees were sent out to Palestinian Arab towns to mingle among the locals, frequent markets, stores and restaurants, and join prayers in mosques. During the course of the training he was nicknamed by his comrades "Abu S'heik", a name by which he was to become known throughout the intelligence community.

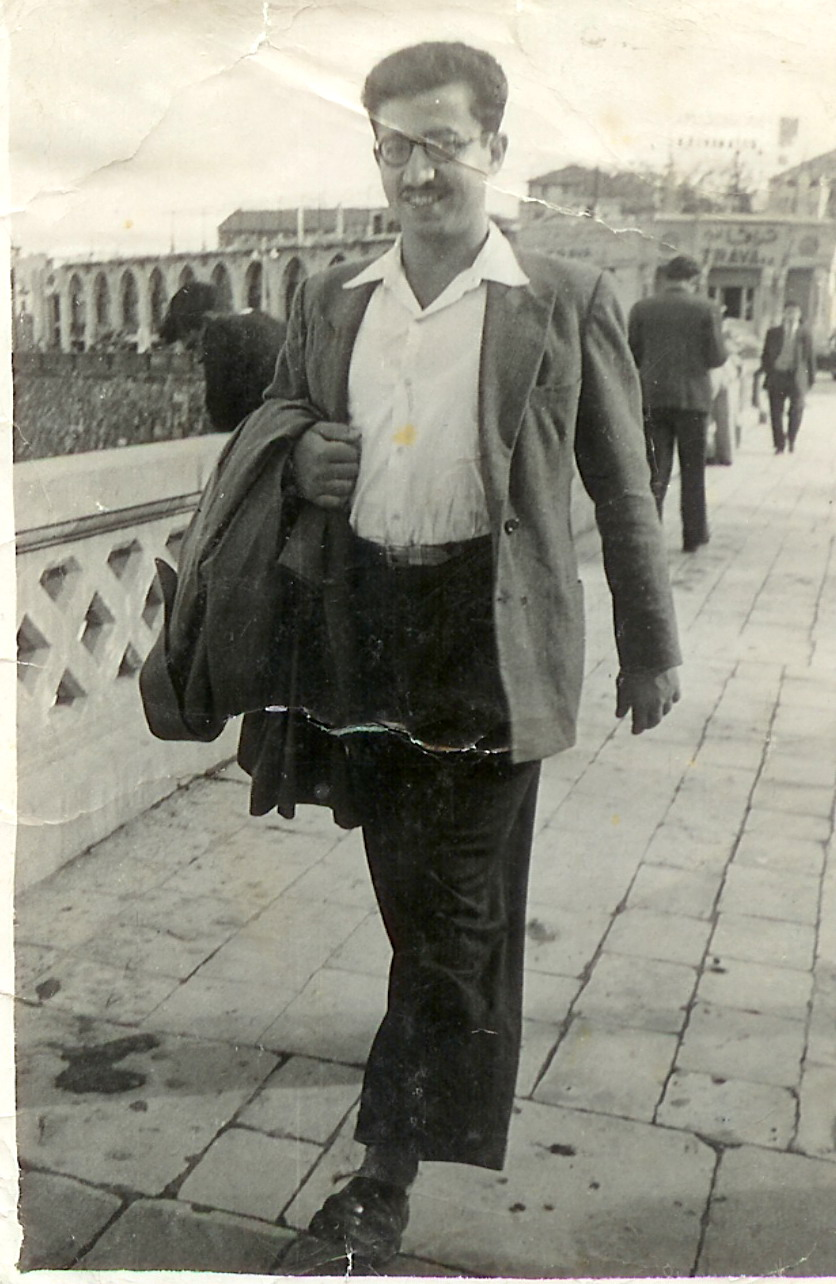
Isaac Shoshan posing as a Palestinian refugee, Beirut

Upon completion of his training, he became an active combatant in the Arab Section and took part in numerous Palmach covert operations, including intelligence gathering on Arab resurrection leaders and weapon smugglers, counter-terrorism activity and targeted attacks.

On 19 February 1948, Shoshan was involved in the assassination attempt of Haj Nimr al-Khatib, a prominent leader of the Muslim Brotherhood and devout supporter of the Grand Mufti Haj Amin al-Husseini. Al-Khatib survived the assassination, but was wounded and incapacitated for the rest of the war, recovering from his injuries in Lebanon and Syria. Later that month information was received at Palmach headquarters that a car bomb had been prepared in an Arab owned garage in Haifa, ready to be positioned and detonated in front of a crowded Haifa movie theater. Arab Section combatants Isaac Shoshan and Yakuba Cohen were ordered to foil the plot and successfully managed to insert another time-detonated car bomb into the garage, devastating the entire garage and the two cars.

=== Overseas operations ===
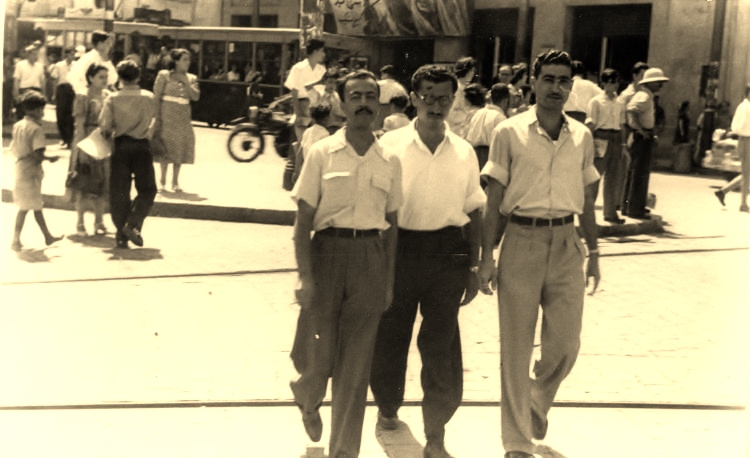
Isaac Shoshan (center) with Gamliel Cohen and Shimon Horesh, Beirut 1948

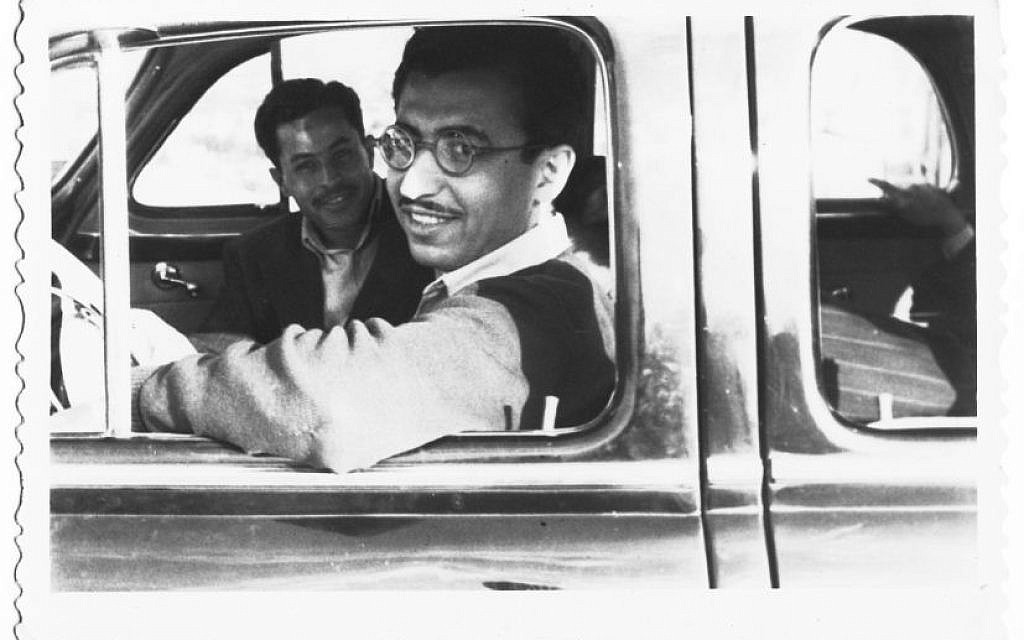
Isaac Shoshan (front) and Havakuk Cohen in their Oldsmobile taxi, Beirut 1949

In early May 1948, towards the departure of the last British troops from Palestine and end of the British Mandate, violent hostilities between Jews and Arabs increased. As thousands of Arabs fled north from Haifa to seek refuge in Lebanon, Isaac Shoshan infiltrated into one of the refugee convoys and arrived in Beirut. Within days of arrival, on 14 May 1948, the State of Israel was declared and consequently the Palmach force, including its Arab Section, were incorporated into the IDF. Shoshan and fellow members of the Arab Section who have established themselves in Beirut under the guise of Arab Palestinian refugees, created an espionage network that during the following two years transmitted valuable information to their operators in Tel Aviv and laid the foundations for Israel's espionage activities in the Arab countries.

Shoshan lived and operated in Beirut under the cover name Abdul Karim Muhammad Sidki. He and his comrades ran a kiosk in Beirut and purchased an Oldsmobile car which they operated as a taxi carrying passengers between Beirut, Damascus and Amman, thus providing them cover for their frequent travels across the Arab countries.

In November 1948, information was received that a former Nazi Vessel, the Aviso Grille, had docked in Beirut following its purchase by a Lebanese businessman. It was suspected that King Farouk of Egypt was behind the purchase, and that the vessel would serve the Egyptian Navy for attacks against Israel. Shoshan managed to locate the vessel and report its location to headquarters, and then, together with a frogman sent from Israel, carried out an operation to sabotage the vessels by attaching explosives to it. The vessel suffered severe damage, and never made it to Egypt. After a partial repair, it was eventually sold for scrap in USA several years later.

In 1950, Shoshan was called back to headquarters and for the following years held various posts in the Military Intelligence Directorate. In 1957 he was one of the founders of "Unit 269", later to be known as the legendary Sayeret Matkal. He was also highly involved in the training and handling of agents in Arab countries, including, amongst others, the Israeli spy in Damascus Eli Cohen, who was eventually captured by the Syrians and executed.

=== In the Mossad ===
In 1966 Shoshan was transferred to the Mossad, where he held a series of operational and administrative duties. He was involved in numerous operations, most of which are still classified. For a period of 10 years he headed the special unit for assisting Jewish communities in enemy countries and covertly facilitating their repatriation to Israel.

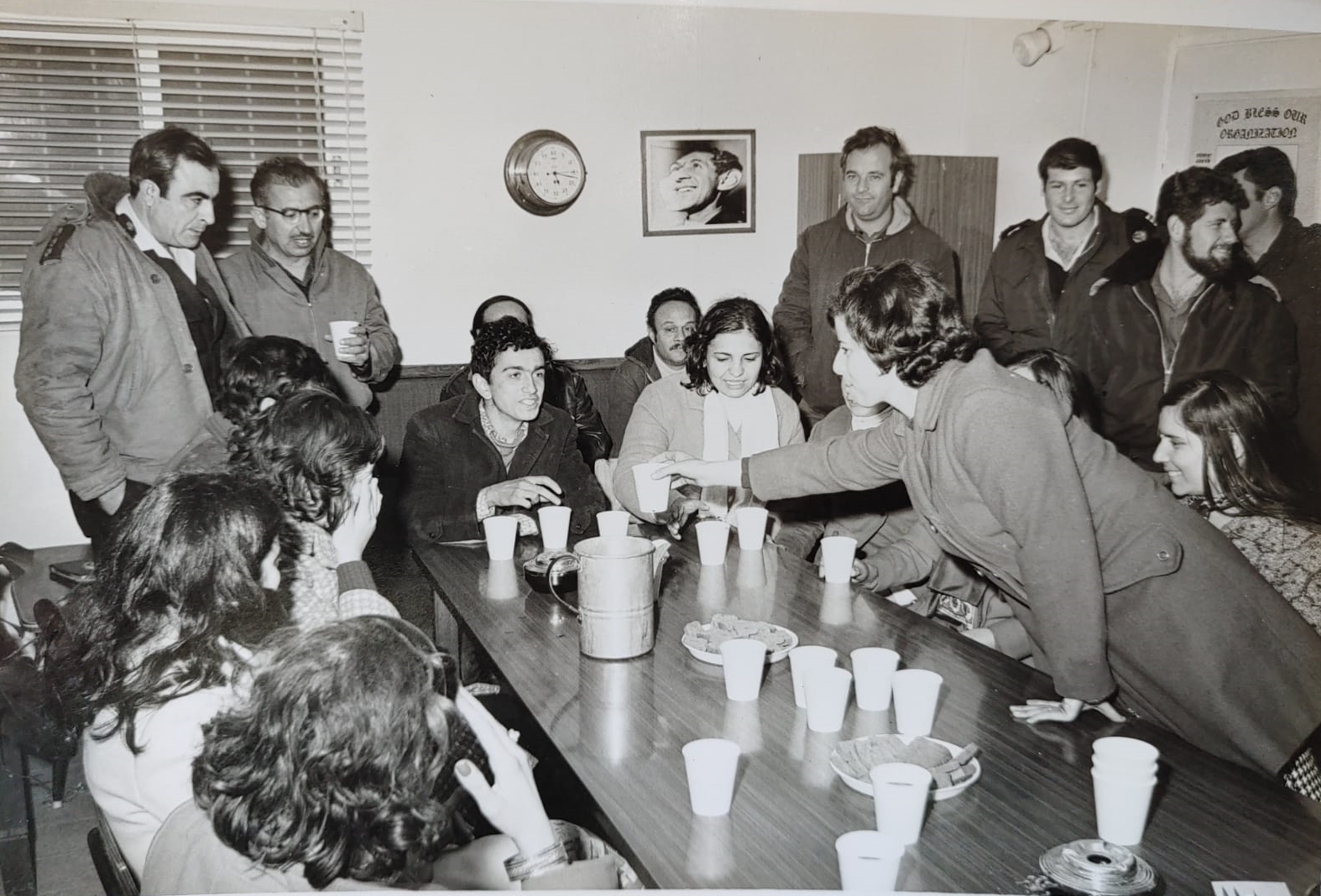
Isaac Shoshan (standing, second from left) celebrating with Navy officials and a group of Syrian Jews their successful arrival by sea, 1973

In 1969 he initiated "Operation Melet", also nicknamed "operation Shoshan", intended to rescue youngsters of the Syrian Jewish community, who under Syrian law were strictly forbidden from leaving the country, and safely bring them to Israel. Using his thorough acquaintance with Syria and Lebanon, as well as his espionage experience and contacts, Shoshan had devised a plan by which these youngsters were smuggled across the border to Lebanon; from Beirut shore, Mossad agents would sneak them onto the boat of a local Lebanese collaborator, that delivered them onwards to an Israeli Navy vessel awaiting in the Mediterranean. Once the system was well established, also entire families, including small children, were smuggled across. The operation continued until 1973, delivering by sea a total of 750 people from Syria via Lebanon to Israel.

Once the sea route was exhausted, Shoshan and his Mossad comrades continued to devise creative ways to smuggle out the remainder of the Syrian Jewish community, including a daring airlift of 100 Jews from Lebanon to Israel, and later a route across the Syrian-Turkish border. Eventually, the vast majority of Syrian Jewry was rescued and arrived at safe haven.

=== Retirement ===
Shoshan officially retired from the Mossad in 1982, however for many years he continued his affiliation with the Organization and volunteered to advise, instruct and lecture to trainees and cadets.

In 1990 he published, together with his former trainee and comrade Rafi Sutton, a book of memoirs Men of Secrets, Men of Mystery: Tales of Israeli Intelligence Behind Enemy Lines.

In 2016 he published another book Pitgam Yashan Shoshan, a collection of Arabic folk fables and idioms translated to Hebrew.

He lived modestly and out of the public eye in Bat Yam in the southern outskirts of Tel Aviv, and died in 2020 at the age of 96.

=== Family and personal life ===
Isaac had multiple siblings: an older half-sister from his mother's first marriage, another older half-sister from his father's first marriage, 3 full brothers and a sister. Isaac's mother died when he was 7 years old, and his father married his third wife – bringing along with her 2 additional daughters, step-sisters to Isaac. They all lived together in a crowded home in the Bahsita Jewish quarter of the Ancient City of Aleppo.

During Isaac's undercover stay in Beirut, he was dating a Christian-Lebanese woman who had fallen in love with him. That relationship came to an end when the woman's brother found out she was dating a "Muslim", as Isaac was thought to be under his assumed identity.

Once back in Israel, in 1952, Isaac married Yaffa – a Jewish Israeli of Syrian origin, and they had a son, Jacob (born 1954) and a daughter Eti (born 1959). Yaffa died in 1970, and in 1973 Isaac married Rachel, with whom he lived for the rest of his life.
