= Tel Dor =

Archeological site in Israel

- Tell el-Burj, Khirbet el-Burj (Arabic)
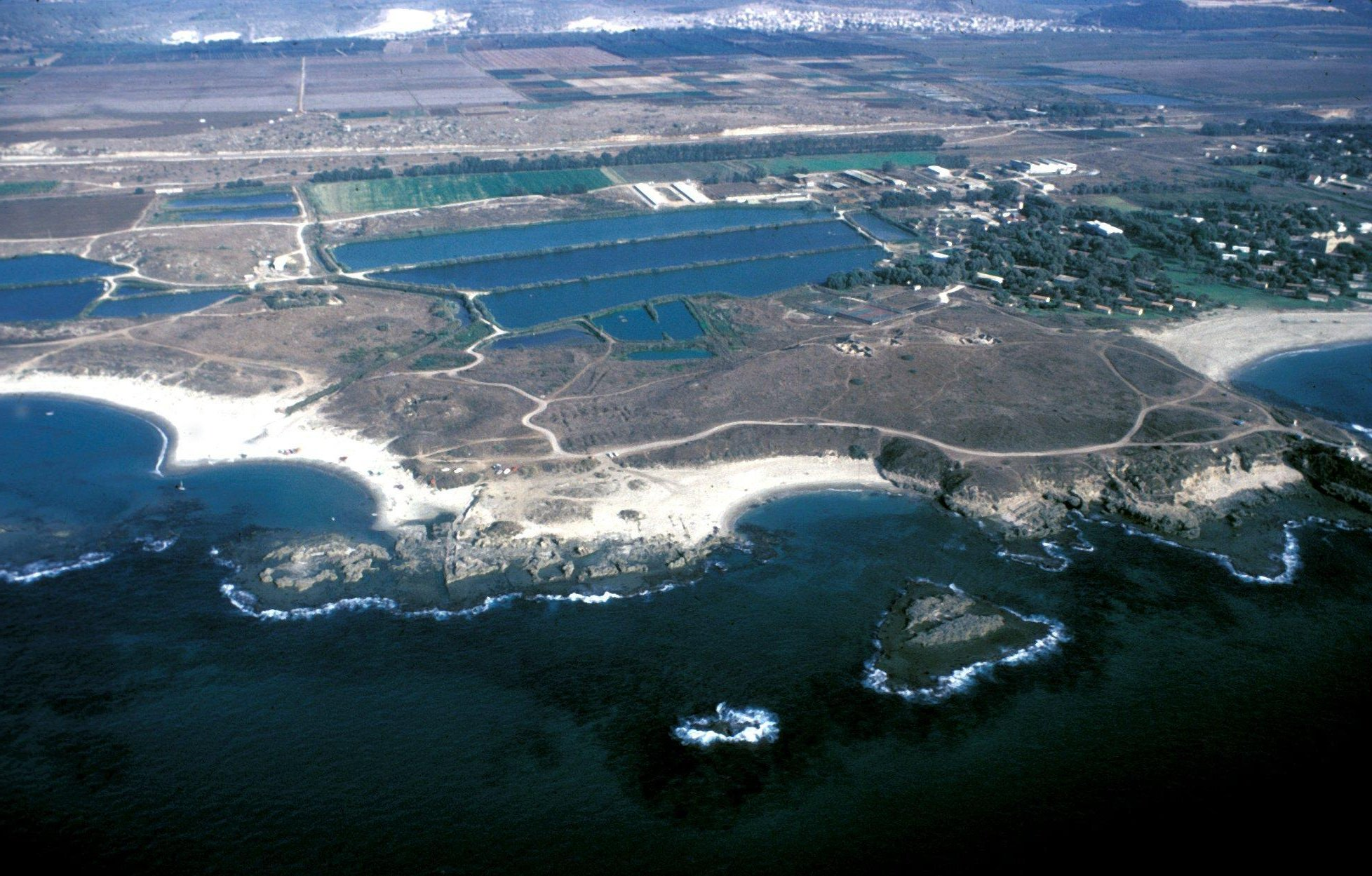
- Tel Dor from above

- Location within Haifa region of Israel Location within Israel
- 32°37′03″N 34°55′03″E
- Type: Settlement
- Location: Haifa District, Israel
- Region: Levant

History
- Abandoned: 630s

Site notes
- Condition: In ruins

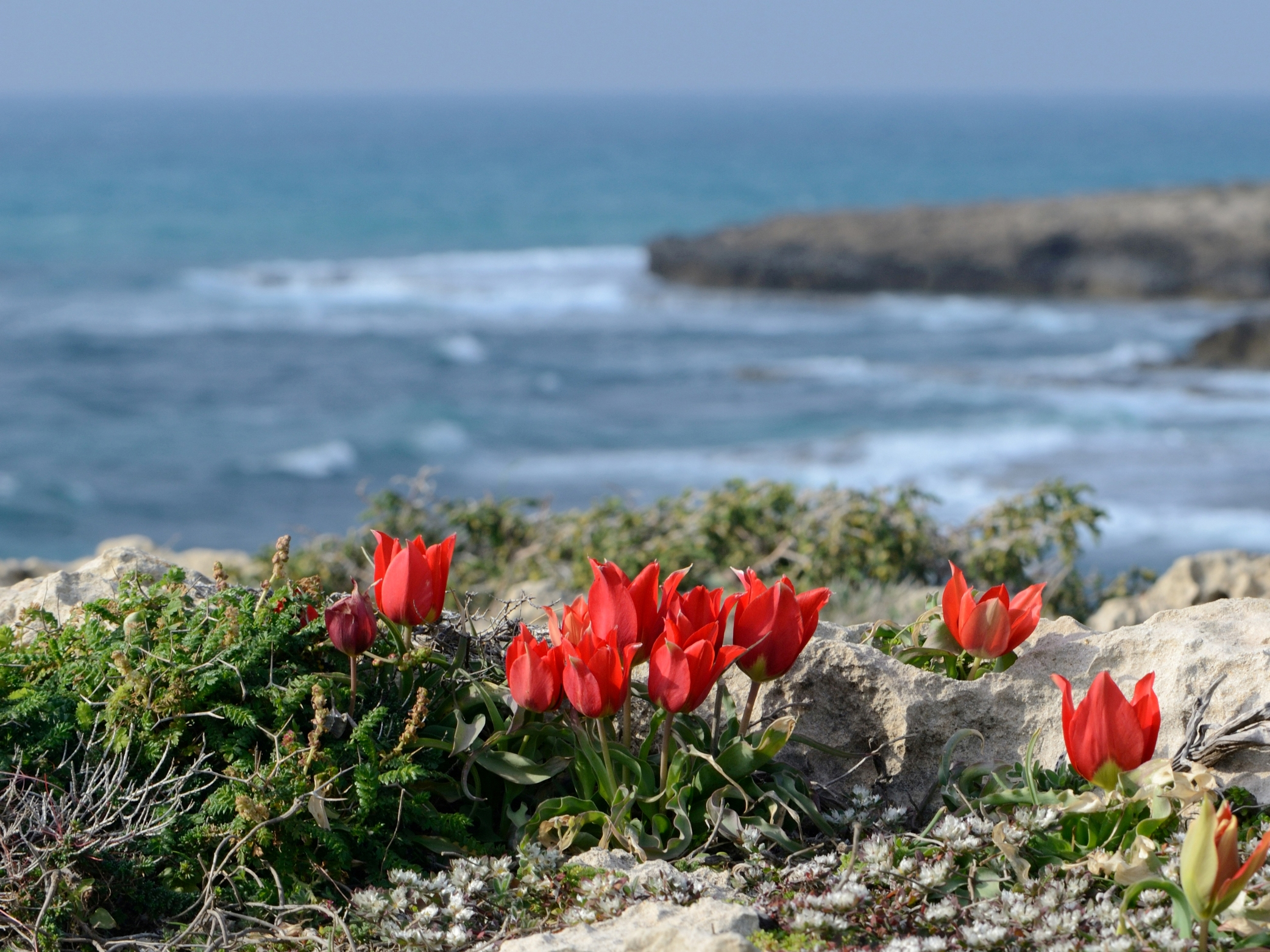
Tulipa agenensis sharonensis, Dor-Habonim beach

Tel Dor (Hebrew: דוֹר or דאר, meaning "generation", "habitation") or Tell el-Burj, also Khirbet el-Burj in Arabic (lit. Tell, or Ruin, of the Tower), is an archaeological site located on the Israeli coastal plain of the Mediterranean Sea next to modern moshav Dor, about 30 kilometers (19 mi) south of Haifa, and 2.5 kilometers (1.6 mi) west of Hadera. Lying on a small headland at the north side of a protected inlet, it is identified with D-jr of Egyptian sources, Biblical Dor, and with Dor/Dora of Greek and Roman sources.

The documented history of the site begins in the Late Bronze Age (though the town itself was founded in the Middle Bronze Age, c. 2000 BCE), and ends in the Crusader period. The city was successively ruled by Canaanites, Sea Peoples, Phoenicians, Assyrians, Persians, Greeks, Jews, Romans and Byzantines. The port dominated the fortunes of the town throughout its 3,000 year history. Its primary role in all these diverse cultures was that of a commercial entrepôt and a gateway between East and West. The remains of the pre-1948 Palestinian Arab village of Tantura lie a few hundred meters south of the archaeological site. A kibbutz and the resort of Nahsholim were built on the site of the village after the Tantura massacre.

== Etymology ==
D46 Z4 D21 Z1 T14 N25 O49
djr
in hieroglyphs
Era: Late Period
(664–332 BC)

Dor (Hebrew: דוֹר or דאר, meaning "generation", "habitation"), was known as Dora (Greek: τὰ Δῶρα) to the Greeks and Romans, and as Dir in the Late Egyptian Story of Wenamun.

The city was known as Dor even before the Greeks arrived or had contact with the peoples in Israel. When the Greeks came to the city and learned its name to be Dor, they called it Dora, possibly after a Dorus said to be a son of Poseidon.

== Location and identification ==
Dora of the classical period has been placed in the ninth mile from Caesarea, on the way to Ptolemais (Acre). Just at the point indicated was the small village of Tantura, probably an Arabic corruption of Dora.

== Hebrew Bible ==
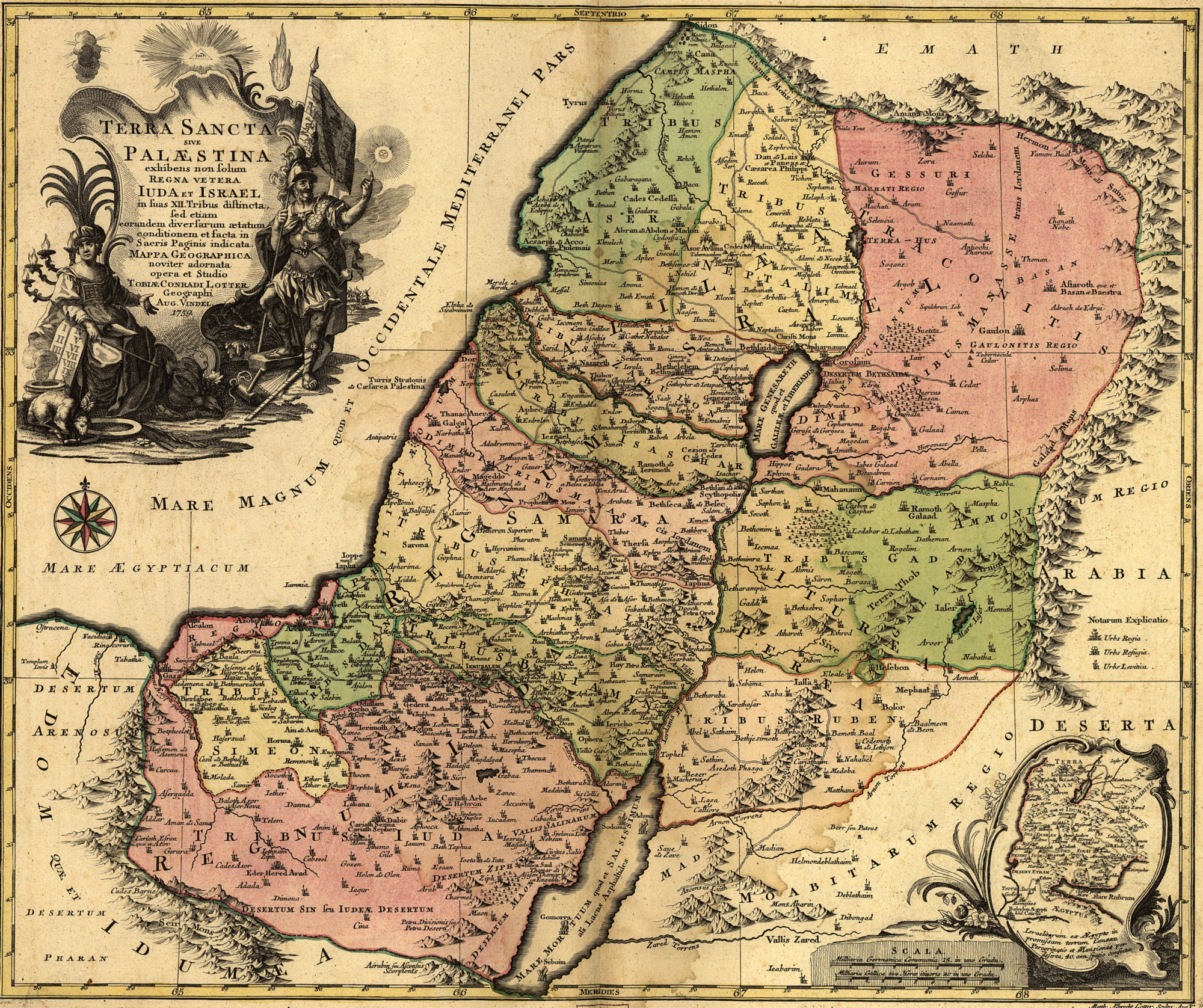
1759 map of the Holy Land and 12 tribes, showing Dor as part of Manasseh

In the Hebrew Bible, Dor is depicted as an ancient royal city of the Canaanites, (Joshua 12:23) whose ruler was an ally of Jabin king of Hazor against Joshua, (Joshua 11:1,2). It appears to have been within the territory of the tribe of Manasseh, though they never managed to conquer it (Joshua 17:11; Judges 1:27). It was one of Solomon's commissariat districts (Judges 1:27; 1 Kings 4:11).

== History and archaeology ==
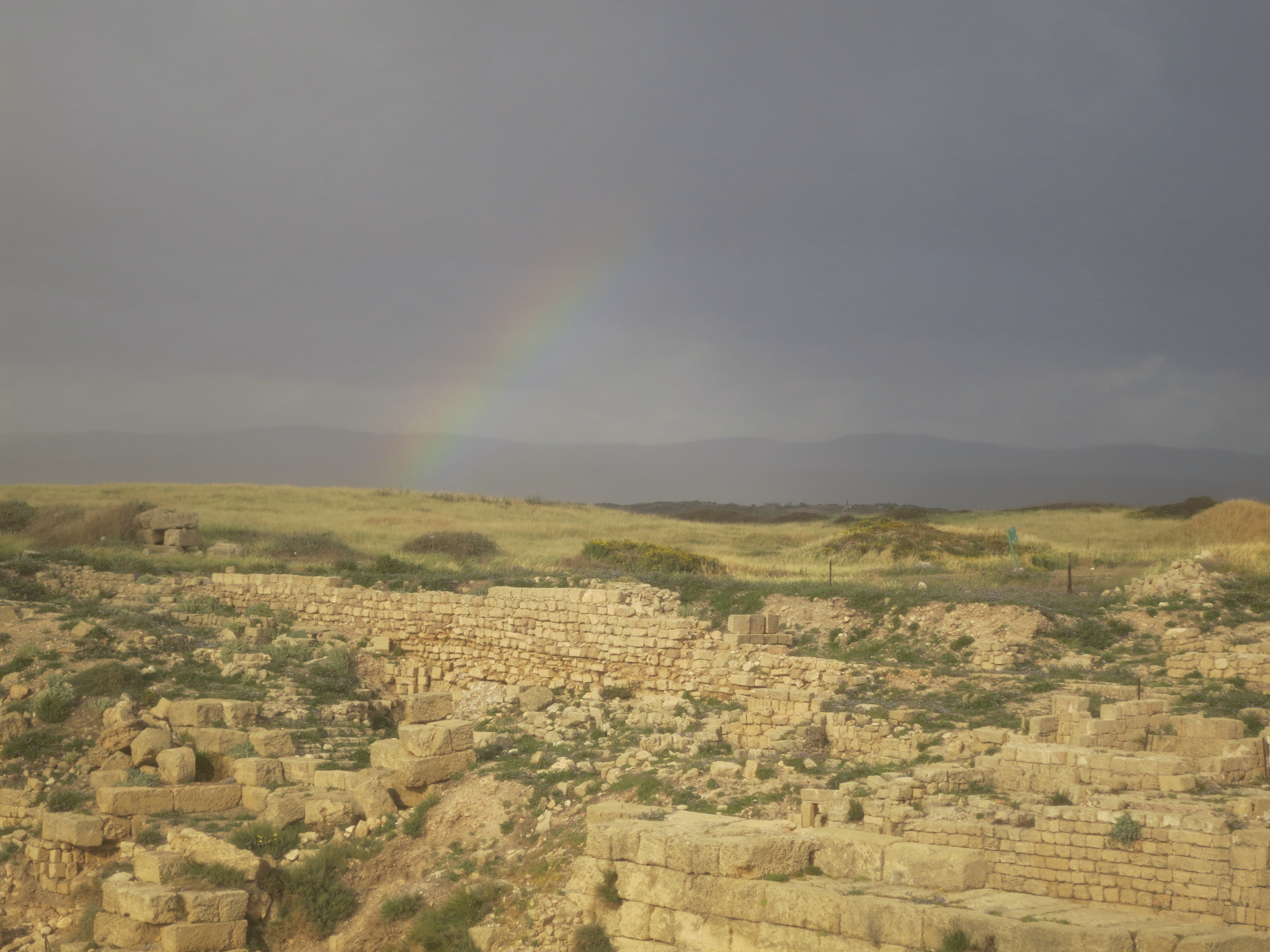
Antiquities at Tel Dor

According to IAA archaeologists, the importance of Dor is that it is the only natural harbour on the Levant coast south of the Ladder of Tyre, and thus was occupied continuously from Phoenician times until the late 18th century. According to Josephus, however, its harbour was inferior to that of Caesarea.

Dor is mentioned in the 3rd-century Mosaic of Rehob as being a place exempt from tithes, seeing that it was not settled by Jews returning from the Babylonian exile in the 4th century BCE.

=== Early Iron Age (Iron Age I) ===
After the Late Bronze Age collapse, the town appears to have been settled by a migrant group called the Tjekker.

Ramesses XI. In the Egyptian literary text known as the Story of Wenamun, the main character visits Dor and is received by Tjekker prince named Beder. This layer of the settlement is known archaeologically as Dor XII, and dates from c. 1150–1050 BC.

The city was violently destroyed in the mid-11th century BCE, with the conflagration turning the mud bricks red and depositing a huge layer of ash and debris. Ephraim Stern linked the city's destruction to the Phoenician conquest of the Tjekkers. After this event, until the end of 1st millennium BCE, the city was inhabited primarily by Phoenicians, despite a brief period of Israelite rule around 1000 BCE.

=== Persian period ===
For supporting his conquest of Egypt, King Cambyses II of Persia (r. 530-522 BCE) awarded Sidon with rule of Dor.

=== Athenian period ===
In ca. 460 BCE, the Athenians formed an alliance with the Egyptian leader Inaros against the Persians. In order to reach the Nile Delta and support the Egyptians, the Athenian fleet had to sail south. Athens had secured landing sites for their triremes as far south as Cyprus, but they needed a way station between Cyprus and Egypt. They needed a naval base on the coast of Lebanon or Palestine, but the Phoenician cities of Sidon and Tyre held much of the mainland coast and those cities were loyal to Persia. Fifty miles south of those cities, however, the Athenians found an isolated and tempting target for establishing a way station.

The Athenians seized Dor from Sidon. Dor had many strategic advantages for the Athenians, starting with its distance from Sidon. The Athenians had a maritime empire built on oared ships. They did not need large tracts of land and instead needed strategically situated coastal sites that had fresh water, provisions and protection from bad weather and enemy attack. Dor had an unfailing freshwater spring near the edge of the sea and to its south a lagoon and sandy beach enclosed by a chain of islets. This was precisely what the Athenian fleet needed for landing their ships and resting their crews. Dor itself was strategically situated. It stood atop a rocky promontory and was protected on its landward side by a marshy swale that formed a natural moat. Beyond the coastal lowlands was Mount Carmel. The town had Persian-built fortifications. In addition to this, the town had straight streets and Phoenician dye pits for the purpling of cloth. For these reasons, Dor became the most remote outpost of the Athenian navy.

=== Hellenistic period ===
During the Hellenistic period, Dor became a strategic site frequently contested by the Ptolemaic Kingdom and the Seleucid Empire, both vying for control of the region. In 219 BCE, the city, then under Ptolemaic rule, withstood an attack by Seleucid king Antiochus III. At the turn of the century, Dor, along with the regions of Judea and Phoenicia, was incorporated into Seleucid rule. In 138 BCE, Seleucid king Antiochus VII Sidetes and Jewish leader Simon Thassi besieged Dor, which was occupied by the usurper Diodotus Tryphon. This siege led to Tryphon's flight and eventual death. The battle is corroborated by the discovery of lead sling bullets and other projectiles found near the site.

At the beginning of the reign of the Hasmonean king Alexander Jannaeus, Dor was under the control of the tyrant Zoilus, who also ruled Straton's Tower and Gaza. Alexander Jannaeus eventually took control of the city and incorporated it into the Jewish kingdom. In 63 BCE, the Roman general Pompey conquered Judaea and subsequently annexed Dor to the province of Syria.

=== Roman period ===
In the early 40s CE, young men in Dor placed a statue of Emperor Claudius inside a Jewish synagogue, provoking a challenge to Jewish ownership of the space. Agrippa responded by appealing to Petronius, the legate of Syria, who ordered the statue's removal and reaffirmed Jewish rights to practice their customs freely under imperial decree. In the early phases of the Great Jewish Revolt against Rome (66–73 CE), Cestius Gallus held Jewish hostages in Dora, which was described as a city of Phoenice.

Dor's decline seems to have started in the first century, despite evidence suggesting otherwise. Excavations have revealed numerous Roman-period structures, including a theater, public building, baths, and temples. Underwater surveys show artifacts spanning from the Herodian period to the mid-seventh century. Epigraphical evidence indicates a thriving urban life during the Roman era, with dedications to emperors and local officials. The town appears on the Tabula Peutingeriana, indicating its significance as a coastal station during the Roman period. A second-century papyrus also mentions it. Coins minted in Dora used a calendar beginning from its separation from the Jewish kingdom by Pompey in 63 BCE, with minting activities continuing into 212 CE. By Jerome's time (340s–420 CE), the town was reportedly deserted.

=== Byzantine period ===
During the Byzantine period, Dor remained an active settlement. Archaeological findings indicate a vibrant community with evidence of economic, religious, and administrative activities. The town served as a bishopric, with bishops documented in 449 (just a few decades after Jerome described it as deserted), and again in 518 and 553. The place is mentioned in two lists from the 6th century. Additionally, a Byzantine church discovered from this period was found to remain in use into the Islamic period.

=== State of Israel ===
A moshav south of Tel Dor is named "Dor" after the ancient city.

The Palestinian victims of the 1948 Tantura massacre are buried in a mass grave under a car park for the nearby Tel Dor beach.

== Excavation history ==
Excavations at Tel Dor

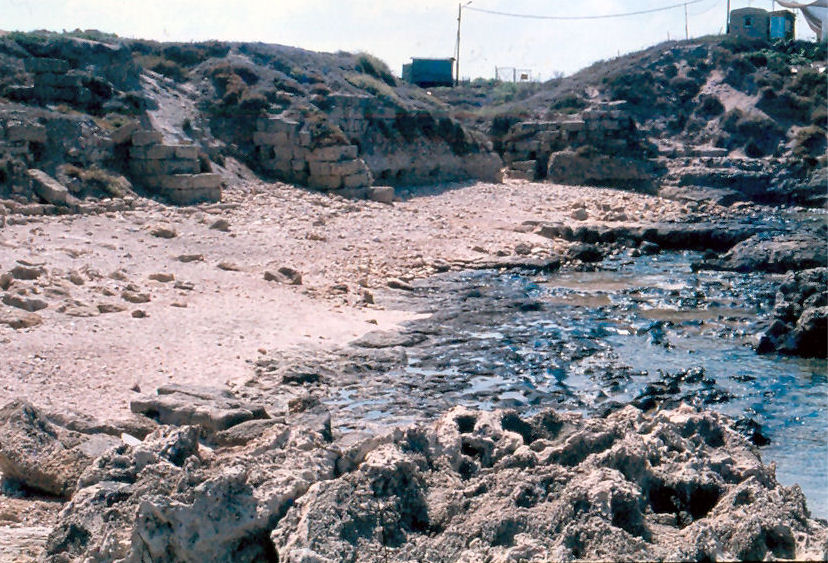
Beach at Tel Dor

Tel Dor ("the Ruin of Dor") was first investigated in the 1920s by John Garstang, on behalf of the British School of Archaeology in Jerusalem. J. Leibowitz excavated in the lower town around the tell in the 1950s. From 1979 to 1983, Claudine Dauphin excavated a church east of the tell. Avner Raban excavated harbour installations and other constructions mainly south and west of the mound in 1979 - 1984. Underwater surveys around the site were carried out by Kurt Raveh, Shelley Wachsman and Saen Kingsley. Ephraim Stern, of the Institute of Archaeology at the Hebrew University, directed twenty seasons of excavations at the site between 1980 and 2000, in cooperation with the Israel Exploration Society. The eleven excavation areas opened have revealed a wealth of information about the Iron Age, Persian, Hellenistic and Early Roman periods.

== Archaeological findings ==
=== Purple dye production ===
As of 2001, excavations at the site have yielded an apparatus for the production of a purple dye solution, dating to the Persian and Hellenistic periods, wherein there was still a thick layer of quicklime (calcium oxide) which served, according to scholars, in helping to separate the dye from the mollusks after they had been broken and removed from their shells. These mollusks were primarily imported into the region from other places along the Mediterranean coast, and consisted of species Phorcus turbinatus, Patella caerulea, Stramonita haemastoma, Hexaplex trunculus, among other species.

=== Neolithic tsunami ===
In 2020, archaeologists discovered evidence of a tsunami that destroyed middle Pre-Pottery Neolithic B coastal settlements in Tel Dor. The tsunami occurred at some time between 7900 - 7200 BCE. It traveled between 3.5 and 1.5 km inland and was approximately 16 m high. Recovery in the affected areas was slow but overall, it did not significantly affect the social development of the southern Levant. Whilst the tsunami is not identified with the Biblical flood, it is believed to contribute to the flood myths found in numerous cultures.

== Museum ==
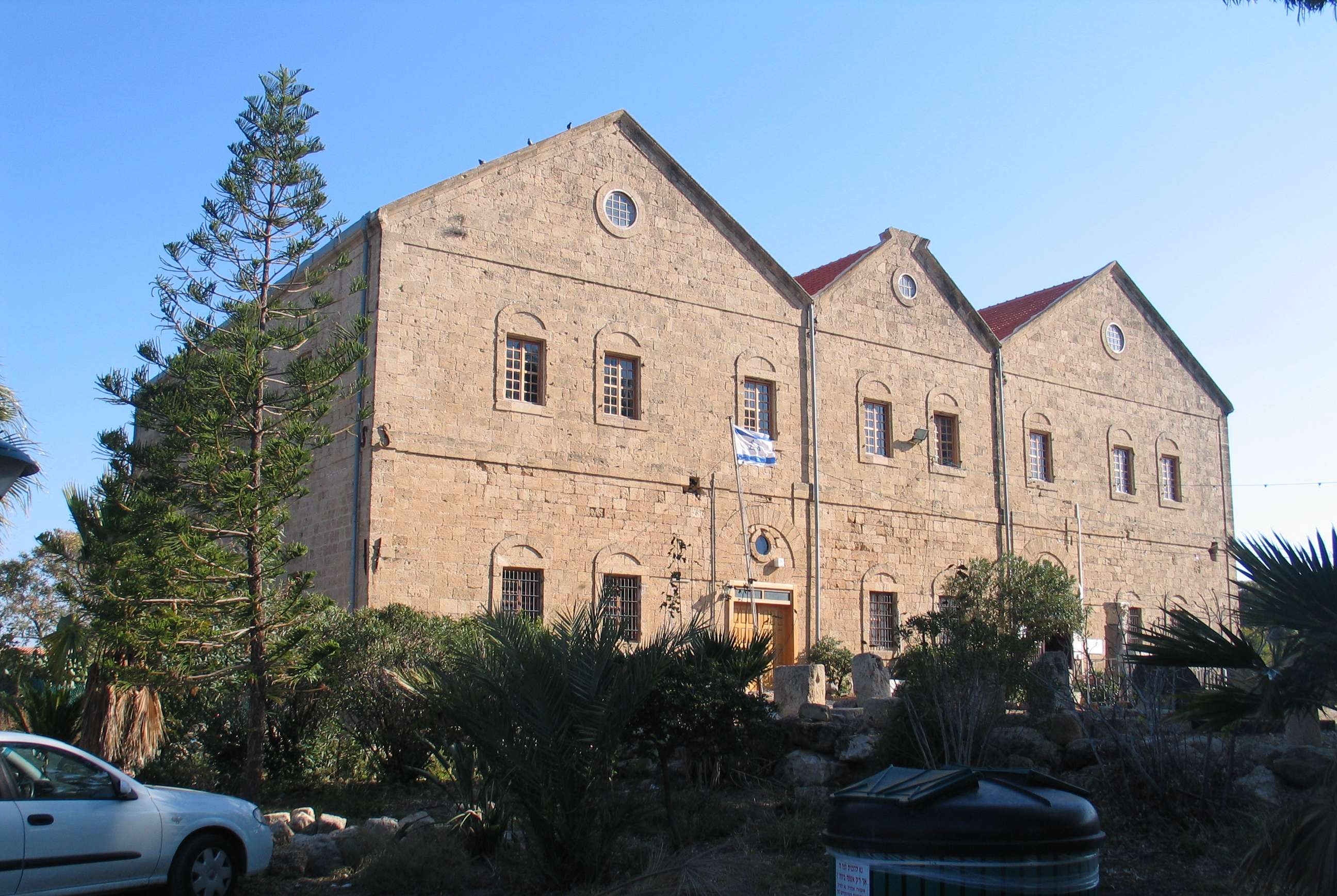
Former glass factory at Nahsholim, now a museum

The historic 'Glasshouse' museum building, located in kibbutz Nahsholim, some 500 meters south of the site itself, now houses the Center for Nautical and Regional Archaeology at Dor (CONRAD), consisting of the expedition workrooms and a museum displaying the finds from Tel Dor and its region such as documenting the city's importance in the ancient world as a manufacturer of the prestigious azure and crimson colours from sea snails. The house is an old glass-making factory from the 19th century built by Baron Edmond James de Rothschild.

== See also ==
- Cities of the ancient Near East

== Bibliography ==
- Briant, Pierre (2002). From Cyrus to Alexander: A history of the Persian Empire. Winona Lake, IN: Eisenbrauns. ISBN 978-1-57506-120-7.
- Olami, Y., Sender, S. and Oren, E., Map of Dor (30) (Jerusalem, Israel Antiquities Authority, 2005).
- Full Tel Dor bibliography http://dor.huji.ac.il/bibliography.html
