= Yoav Gelber =

Israeli historian (born 1943)

- יואב גלבר
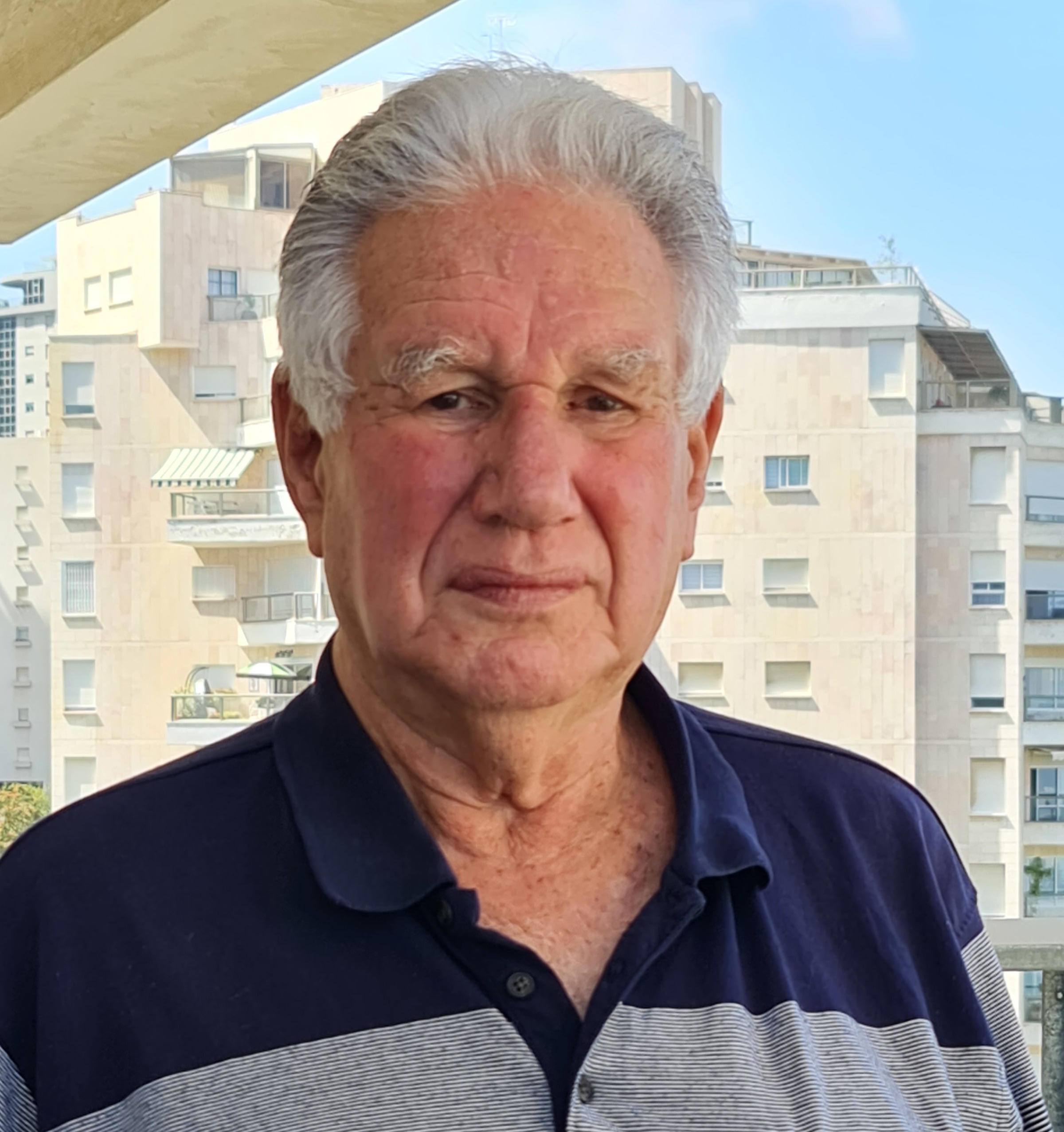
- Gelber in 2021
- Born: September 25, 1943 (age 83); Mandatory Palestine
- Education: Hebrew University
- Occupation: Historian

Yoav Gelber (Hebrew: יואב גלבר; born September 25, 1943) is an Israeli professor of history at the University of Haifa, and was formerly a visiting professor at the University of Texas at Austin.

He was born in Mandatory Palestine in 1943 and studied world and Jewish history at the Hebrew University of Jerusalem and is an expert on the history of the Israel Defense Forces. Gelber is also known to have been a vocal opponent of Ilan Pappé when the latter was employed by the University of Haifa, and a defender of the Alexandroni Brigade in the Tantura massacre case.

In 1973 Gelber served as the academic and military assistant to the Agranat Commission, and in 1982 participated in the official inquiry into the 1933 death of Haim Arlosoroff.

== Works ==
- Jewish Palestinian Volunteering in the British Army during the Second World War, Vol. I: Volunteering and its Role in Zionist Policy 1939-1942, (Hebrew, Yad Izhak Ben-Zvi, Jerusalem 1979).
- Jewish Palestinian Volunteering in the British Army during the Second World War, Vol. II, The Struggle for a Jewish Army, (Hebrew, Yad Izhak Ben-Zvi, Jerusalem 1981). ISBN 965-217-002-X
- Jewish Palestinian Volunteering in the British Army during the Second World War, Vol. III. The Standard Bearers - The Mission of the Volunteers to the Jewish People, (Hebrew, Yad Izhak Ben-Zvi, Jerusalem 1983).
- Jewish Palestinian Volunteering in the British Army during the Second World War, Vol. IV, Jewish Volunteers in British Units, (Hebrew, Yad Izhak Ben-Zvi, Jerusalem 1984).
- The Emergence of a Jewish Army - The Veterans of the British Army in the IDF (Hebrew, Yad Izhak Ben-Zvi, Jerusalem 1986);
- Why the Palmach Was Disbanded? - The Jewish Military Force in the Transition from a Yishuv to a State 1947-1949 (Hebrew, Schocken, Tel Aviv 1986);
- With Walter Goldstern: Emigration deutsch-sprachiger Ingenieure nach Palaestina 1933-1945 (VDI Verlag, Düsseldorf, 1988). ("Emigration of German-speaking engineers to Palestine, 1933-1945")
- Massada - The Defense of Palestine in the Second World War (Hebrew, Bar-Ilan University Press, Ramat-Gan, 1990).
- A New Homeland - The Immigration from Central Europe and its Absorption in Eretz Israel 1933-1948 (Hebrew, Leo Baeck Institute and Yad Izhak Ben- Zvi, Jerusalem 1990).
- The History of Israeli Intelligence, Part I: Growing a Fleur-de-Lis: The Intelligence Services of the Jewish Yishuv in Palestine, 1918-1947 (Hebrew, Israel Ministry of Defense Publications), 2 Vols. Tel Aviv 1992.
- Jewish-Transjordanian Relations, 1921-1948 (English, Frank Cass, London & Portland 1996).
- The History of Israeli Intelligence, Part II: Budding a Fleur-de-Lis: Israeli Intelligence in the War of Independence, 1947-1949 (Hebrew, 2 vols. Israel Ministry of Defense Publications, Tel Aviv 2001).
- The History of Israeli Intelligence, Part III: 1949-1953, Vol. I-III (Hebrew, Classified edition, an IDF publication, 1999–2000).
- Palestine 1948: War, Escape and the Emergence of the Palestinian Refugee Problem, Sussex Academic Press, Brighton & Portland 2001.
- Independence Versus Nakbah: The Arab–Israeli War of 1948 (Kinneret Zmora-Bitan Dvir, Hebrew, 2004).
- Israeli-Jordanian Dialogue, 1948-1953: Cooperation, Conspiracy, or Collusion? (Sussex Academic Press, May 2004).
- Nation and History: Israeli Historiography between Zionism and Post-Zionism, Vallentine Mitchell, February 2011.
- The Jihad That Wasn't, a review of "1948: A History of the First Arab-Israeli War" by Benny Morris, Azureonline, Automn 2008, n°34.
- Attrition: The Forgotten War (Kinneret Zmora-Bitan Dvir, Hebrew, 2017)
- The Time of the Palestinians: Israel, Jordan and the Palestinians, 1967-1970 (Kinneret Zmora-Bitan Dvir, Hebrew, 2018)
