= Nimr al-Khatib =

Palestinian political leader (1918– 2010)

Muhammad Nimr al-Khatib (Arabic: محمد نمر الخَطيب (1918 – 15 November 2010) was a Palestinian leader and pro-Husayni head of the Arab Higher Committee in Haifa during the 1947–1948 Civil War in Mandatory Palestine. He founded an Islamic society called Jam‘iyyat al-I‘tisam in 1941. Khatib's family held the mufti-ship of Haifa during Ottoman rule.

Khatib was targeted for assassination by the Haganah, as part of Operation Zarzir, on 19 February 1948. Two Shahar agents fired 32 bullets at a taxi in which he was traveling north of Haifa on a return journey from Damascus. He was hit by one bullet in the lung and three in the left shoulder. Isaac Shoshan had been instructed to "run back and appear to be helping, but actually to make sure the sheikh was dead, and if not, to finish the job off with my handgun". However, British soldiers prevented Shoshan from reaching the car. One passenger died and one other was wounded in the attack. Al-Khatib remained outside of Palestine for the rest of the war.

Khatib was the author of a notable account of the 1948 War entitled The Events of the Disaster (Min Athar al-Nakba). Khatib was the first writer to note the Tantura massacre.
