= Israeli POW and labor camps in the 1948 Arab–Israeli War =

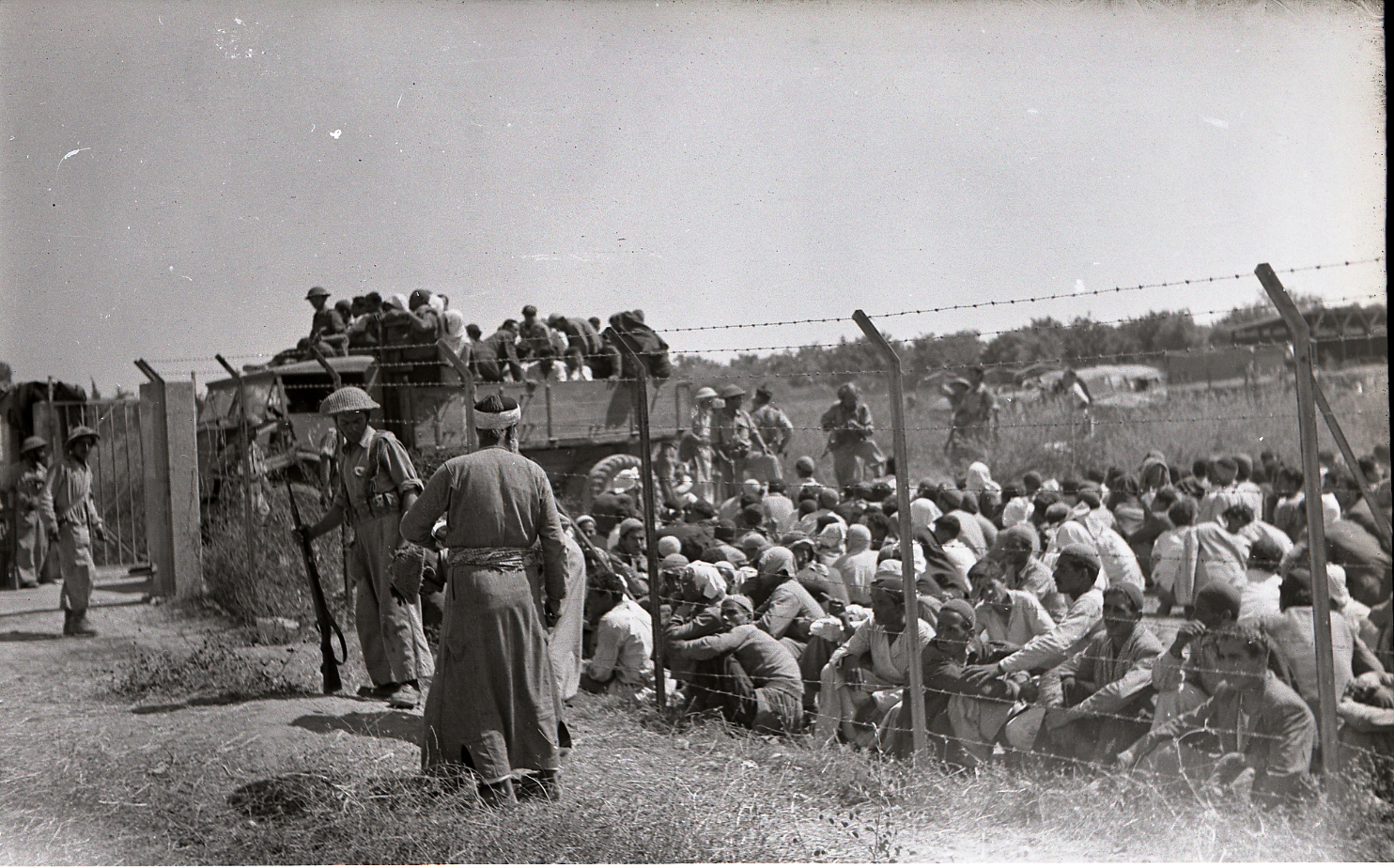
A camp near Ramla. Photo by Beno Rothenberg on 10 July 1948

During the 1948 Arab-Israeli war, Israel established several prisoner of war and labor camps for Arab prisoners, both civilians and military personnel. Around 5,000 Palestinian civilians were held in four official camps, though there were also unofficial camps. These camps were investigated by the International Committee of the Red Cross (ICRC), with one official describing the conditions as 'slavery'. Camp inmates were forced to work in agricultural, military and other projects by the new Israeli state. At the end of the war, the inmates were either exchanged with Jewish prisoners captured by Arab forces or were dumped across the border away from Israel.

== History ==
Few prisoners were taken during the civil war phase in Mandatory Palestine, due to the goal of Zionist militias of expelling, rather than capturing, Palestinians. The number of captives increased following the intervention of surrounding Arab states after the abolition of the Mandate and the Israeli declaration of Independence, beginning the second phase of the war. By October 1948, the camp system had been institutionalized under the supervision of Yigael Yadin following an initial disorganized period. The survivors of the Tantura massacre, as well as Palestinians from Ramle and Lydda, Nazareth, Acre and Tamra, were sent to labor camps. The first camp was established in Ijlil (no. 791) in mid May 1948, which the New York Times described as "a tent camp hastily thrown up on the sand and scrub of a little valley". The tents were created by the prisoners themselves, and were surrounded by a barbed wire fence, with watchtowers and guards. The Atlit detainee camp (no. 792) was created in July, having been used by the British government during the Mandate period to detain German, Italian POWs during World War II, as well as illegal Jewish immigrants. The Sarafand camp (no. 793) was established in September following the depopulation of the village. Atlit became the second largest official camp, holding up to 2,900 prisoners; the largest was Ijlil, which was expanded to hold 4,200. Sarafand could hold 800-1,200 with a maximum capacity of 1,800. The smallest camp was at Tel Letwinksy (no. 794) which was built to hold 500-1000 people but did hold more. The camps were administered by former British officers who defected following the British withdrawal, as well as former members of Irgun and Lehi who were integrated into the Israeli military. At its peak, the camp administration employed 973 soldiers. The fifth camp at Umm Khalid was never official, though it was assigned a number (no. 795). It was initially under the Ijlil camp and served as a labor camp where POWs and civilians were sent to work for weeks at a time. Though there were plans to expand the camp to hold 1,500 prisoners, it was shut down, with the internees moved to other camps by the end of 1948. There were also unofficial camps, though their exact number is unknown. Prisoner testimonies suggest that there were at least 17; most of them were small sites with no more than "a police station, a school, or the house of a village notable". ICRC reports suggest that there was a small camp ("Hahuza") in Haifa with 170 internees who were held for up to two days with other transit camps in the same area.

While most of the prisoners were military aged men, there were exceptions; in a visit to Ijlil in July 1948, the ICRC found 19 elderly men and 77 boys no older than fifteen. ICRC officials described the living conditions abysmal, with many torn tents, defective food, tattered clothes, as well of evidence of abuse by guards. The head of the ICRC mission in Palestine, Jacques de Reynier, reported that many hostages in the start were executed, officially listed as dying of a heart attack. Most of the military-aged men were never combatants, though some the Israelis suspected to have been fighters were shot, with their deaths listed as "attempting to escape". Some did escape and were shot, with the exception of one escape attempt of twenty survivors of the Tantura massacre who were not shot but instead locked naked in a cage with oil poured on them. Palestinian testimonies have been valuable to describe the harsh conditions of limited food and water and poor sleeping conditions. According to Ibrahim ‘Abd al-Qadir Abu Sayf, a villager taken prisoner, he was:

led to a military camp in the mountain which had caves. Because cars could not climb the mountain road, they made us carry ammunition and weapons to the caves. After five days they took us to [the destroyed village of] Julis where we dug sanitary pits. They would not let us drink water except from a hot tap like a car radiator. They threw crumbs of food to us. Then they took us to Qatra police station. They converted the mukhtar’s house into a prison. We were twenty-five to thirty people in a four by five meter room. The room has a sandy floor to absorb blood and pus. We were tortured; many had broken teeth, hands and legs. Food consisted of one loaf for every fifteen people and one piece of vegetable floating in a big pot. In the early morning we were taken to work. They hit us on our heads to move. If one fell, they hit him with their boots. . . . Torture sometimes continued at night. More people came. They were picked up like us, in pastures or in lonely places.

The Israeli "Office of the Custodian for Absentee Property" was established in 1948, allowing Jews to take possession of Palestinian property. Prisoners were used to put to work to loot items that Palestinian refugees left behind during their expulsion and flight, to be distributed to Jews. Other projects include paving a 150 kilometer road from Mitzpe Ramon to Umm Rashrash, as well as digging military trenches and burying the dead. Due to the shortage of workers in Israel, Jewish farmers requested the Israeli government Arab laborers to work on agricultural projects. Following the Palestinian expulsion from Lydda and Ramle, the Ministry of Minority Affairs transferred around one thousand Palestinian workers from the lower Galilee in the north to Ramle and Lydda where they were interned in labor camps. The first camp in Ramle was created in late August for workers from Nazareth and the second was created in early November for workers from Acre and Tamra. A local Jewish landlord and ministry representative from Kfar Bilu Shmuel Zammir, believed that these camps could serve as an experiment for future economic relations between Palestinians and the Israeli state, saying:

This project would create a solid bridge […] and regulate relations between us and the minorities. For this reason, we should make every effort to set the labor camp in Lydda as an example. It should become a permanent camp, since it is located at the heart of the citrus-growing [Jewish] colonies. We must concentrate the most experienced workers here after proper selection and treatment.

Zammir's plan was to help alleviate the employment shortage created by the Israeli military, so Palestinian labor could be used for the citrus, olive, and sesame plantations near Ramle and Lydda. Those camps did not have running water and its inmates were provided with limited low-quality rations. The salary of the soldiers guarding these camps came from the wages of the inmates, meaning that the Palestinian inmates had lower wages then their Jewish counterparts or none at all. Some of the workers were paid in crop instead of cash, which was not applied to Jewish workers. For those paid in cash, laborers employed by Arab sub-contractors were paid less than those employed directly for Custodian of Absentee Property. The Israeli military ransacked the Galilee for food, killing cattle and confiscating goats, sheep cattle and chickens. This created a "hunger economy", supplying the military with unemployed Palestinians pressured to work for food. One ministry official wrote in February 1949 that "entire families were still genuinely starving."

According to official Israeli records, there were 4,850 noncombatant prisoners of military age (14 to 70) and 1,100 combatant (900 Arabs soldiers and 200 Palestinians irregulars). The Israeli historian Aharon Klien estimated that 7,100 to 7,850 Palestinians and other Arabs were interned at one time or another in the official camps. David Ben-Gurion's diary mentions 9,000 POWs in the camps. Many prisoners remained detained long after fighting had ended in the areas where they had been captured.

On 17 December 1948, the Minority Affairs Ministry director general Gad Machnes said he did not believe "keeping the Arab inhabitants in fenced off concentration camps [mahanot rikuz] was justified any longer." The camps were shut down in May 1949. Only a small number of detainees were allowed to remain in the borders of Israel, most were either taken in buses and dumped across the 1949 armistice lines or were exchanged with Jewish prisoners taken by Jordan. The aforementioned Abu Sayf was blindfolded along with 250 others and driven to the wilderness of Wadi 'Araba. He was recaptured four days later and put to work again before being dropped off near Gaza, later making his way to Hebron.

== See also ==
- Yusif Sayigh: Palestinian economist who was detained in an Israeli camp
- The Prisoner (1948) by S. Yizhar, a short story about a Palestinian prisoner captured and tortured by Israeli soldiers

== Sources ==
=== Primary ===
- Gurson, Syndey (13 Oct 1948). "Israel Holds 2,500 War Captives in Camp Close to Mediterranean". The New York Times. p. 3.
- Sayigh, Rosemary (2007). "Prisoner of War: Yusif Sayigh, 1948 to 1949. Excerpts from his recolletions" (PDF). Jerusalem Quarterly. 29. doi:10.70190/jq.I29.p13.

=== Secondary ===
- Abu Sitta, Salman; Rempel, Terry (2014). "The ICRC and the Detention of Palestinian Civilians in Israel's 1948 POW/Labor Camps". Journal of Palestine Studies. 43 (4): 11–38. doi:10.1525/jps.2014.43.4.11. ISSN 0377-919X. JSTOR 10.1525/jps.2014.43.4.11.
- Gortler, Shai (2025). "Orchestrated Life: Subjectification in 1948 Israeli POW Camps". Theory & Event. 28 (3): 468–492. doi:10.1353/tae.2025.a964137. ISSN 1092-311X.
- Gortler, Shai; al-Ghubari, Umar (17 April 2024). Remembering the Prisoner of War Camps. Zochrot.
- Guttman, Nathan (22 Oct 2014). "Dueling Narratives Emerge on Palestinian Internment Camps". The Forward.
- Kabaha, Mustafa; Awawdeh, Wadi' (2013). أسرى بلا حراب: المعتقلون الفلسطينيون والمعتقلات الإسرائيلية الأولى 1948-1949 [Prisoners Without Batons: Palestinian Detainees and the First Israeli Detention Camps 1948-1949] (in Arabic). Institute for Palestine Studies.
- Kamen, Charles S. (1988). "After the Catastrophe II: The Arabs in Israel, 1948-51". Middle Eastern Studies. 24 (1): 68–109. doi:10.1080/00263208808700730. ISSN 0026-3206. JSTOR 4283223.
- Kamen, Charles S. (1987). "After the Catastrophe I: The Arabs in Israel, 1948–51". Middle Eastern Studies. 23 (4): 453–495. doi:10.1080/00263208708700721. ISSN 0026-3206. JSTOR 4283205.
- Nuriely, Benny (2024). "Accumulation and Surveillance: The Military Rule in Lydda, July 1948-July 1949". In Hirsch, Dafna (ed.). Entangled Histories in Palestine/Israel: Historical and Anthropological Perspectives. Taylor & Francis. doi:10.4324/9781003269090-9.
- Nuriely, Benny (2019). "The Hunger Economy: The Military Government in the Galilee, Ramle, and Lydda, 1948-1949". The Arab Studies Journal. 27 (2). Arab Studies Institute: 64–85. ISSN 1083-4753. JSTOR 27097964.
- Pappé, Ilan (2006). The Ethnic Cleansing of Palestine. Oneworld Publications.
