= Gamliel Cohen =

Israeli spy (1922–2002)

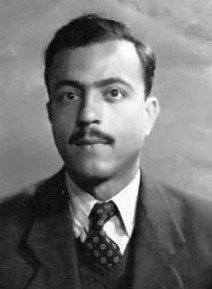
- Gamliel Cohen in 1955
- Native name: גמליאל כהן
- Born: 10 April 1922; Damascus, Syria
- Died: 15 July 2002 (aged 80) Tel Aviv, Israel
- Allegiance: Israel
- Branch: Mossad, Palmach
- Service years: 1944–1964
- Conflicts: 1948 Arab-Israeli War; Infiltration of neo-Nazi groups
- Spouse: Aleeza Tahan
- Children: 3

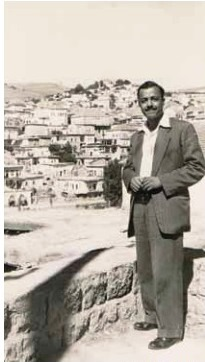
Gamliel Cohen in Lebanon

Gamliel Cohen (Hebrew: גמליאל כהן; April 10, 1922 – July 15, 2002) was "one of the fathers of Israeli espionage". Much of his life was spent living under various false identities in Europe, Africa, and the Middle East. A deep-cover Mossad agent, he infiltrated neo-Nazi groups as well as governments that were hostile to Israel. Cohen wrote a book about the undercover unit he helped to create inside the Palmach, which was posthumously published by the Israeli Ministry of Defense and Galili Center for Defense Studies. Nearly all of Cohen's work at Mossad remains classified today, and his very existence was only publicly acknowledged after his death.

== Early life ==
Cohen was born in Damascus, Syria, to a Jewish family. He moved to Israel in 1943, which was then controlled by the United Kingdom under the British Mandate.

== Palmach ==
Cohen joined the Palmach in 1944. He helped build the department of undercover soldiers known as DAWN. DAWN took advantage of the dark complexion of Israelis who had immigrated from Middle Eastern countries, as well as their familiarity with Islam and Arabic culture. In 1948, Cohen received documents which identified him as a Palestinian. He moved to Beirut using this false identity, and set up a textile shop which served as the front for his spying activities. Cohen gathered information about military installations and Lebanese war efforts against Israel, which he transmitted to his commanders by writing letters in code.

== Mossad ==
Cohen joined Mossad shortly after the State of Israel was created. He worked under deep cover in France during the 1950s. Posing as a journalism student, he was hired as a clerk at the Syrian Embassy in Paris. His job at the Syrian embassy provided him access to sensitive political and military documents, which he secretly photographed and sent the film to Israel.

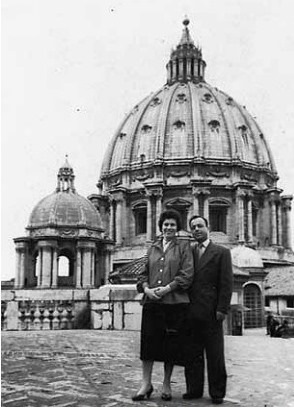
Gamliel and Aleeza Cohen in Rome

== Family ==
In October 1954, Cohen married Aleeza Tahan, a young Israeli woman who had also been born in Damascus, Syria. Like her husband, Aleeza worked for Mossad in Europe, under the false identity of an immigrant from the Middle East. She served as a messenger, carrying documents from Cohen to another Mossad operative. Aleeza often lived in isolation, without social contact or communication with her family in Israel. The Cohens had two daughters while living abroad, and a third child was born in Israel.

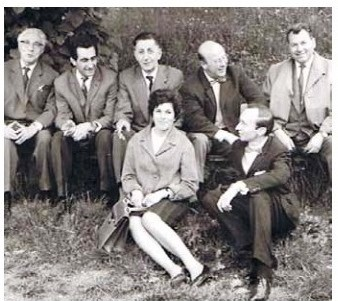
Aleeza Cohen in Vienna

== Nazi Infiltration ==
In 1958, the Cohens moved to Austria. He worked as a journalist, writing articles that were published in various Arab-language newspapers. Cohen's alias as a reporter from the Middle East provided him access to several embassies in Europe, where he befriended diplomats and visited the home of the ambassador. Cohen penetrated neo-Nazi groups, which were of interest to his bosses in Israel during the 1950s and 1960s. In those years, Mossad was actively searching for war criminals who had committed atrocities during the Holocaust.

== Final Years ==
Cohen completed active-duty Mossad service in 1964. Thereafter, he served as a trainer for the next generation of Israeli spies. For many years after his death, Mossad cadets studied his trade craft, information-gathering techniques, and methods for developing contacts at high levels of foreign governments.

Cohen spent his final years authoring the book, "Undercover: The Untold Story of the Palmach's Clandestine Arab Unit." Cohen wrote the book in first person, analyzing his training and operations during the 1940s. It also discussed his personal relationships and work abroad during his Palmach service.

While retired, Cohen gave an interview describing deep-cover activities as "your own, private battlefield." Due to the inherently lonely nature of intelligence work, he stated, a covert operative must love his role and believe it is his destiny. When encountering trouble, the operative must be resourceful to find his own solution.

== Death ==
Cohen died of natural causes, at age 80, in a Tel Aviv hospital. Historian Meir Pail stated, "Gamliel was known in the intelligence community as one of the most successful intelligence agents in Israeli history. The public never heard of him because he was never caught."
