= Tantura massacre =

1948 IDF killing of Palestinian civilians

- Part of the 1948 Palestine war and the Nakba
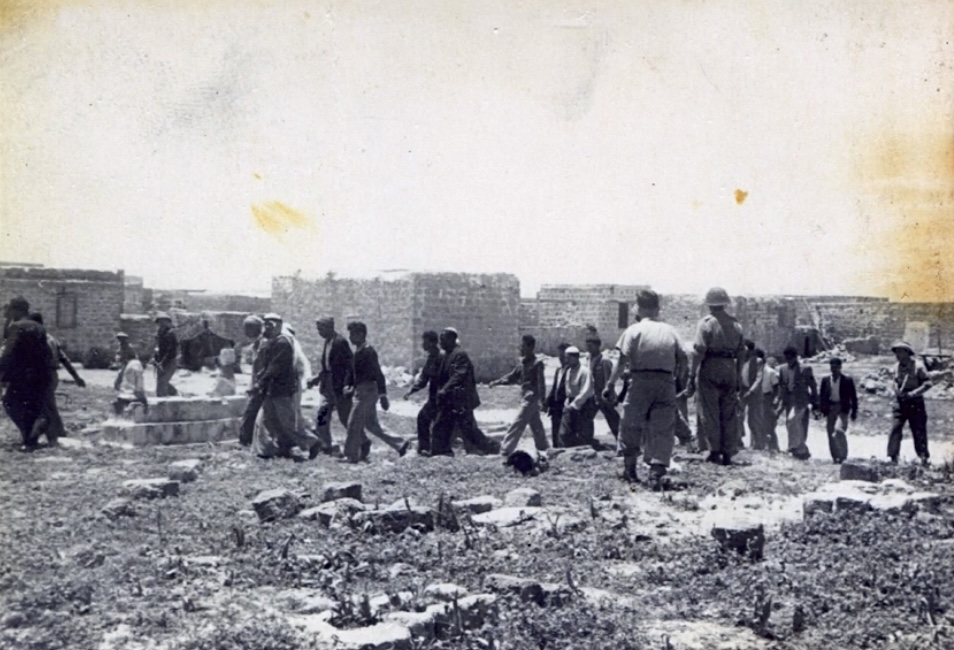
- Israeli soldiers with detained Palestinian men in Tantura, 23 May 1948
- Location: Tantura, Palestine
- Date: 22–23 May 1948
- Target: Palestinian villagers
- Deaths: Unknown; estimates range from "dozens" to 200+
- Perpetrators: Haganah, Alexandroni Brigade

The Tantura massacre took place on 22–23 May 1948 during the 1948 Palestine war, when Palestinian villagers were massacred by Israel's Haganah (a precursor to the Israel Defense Forces), namely the Alexandroni Brigade. The massacre occurred after the surrender of the village of Tantura, a small village of roughly 1,500 located near Haifa. The number of those killed is unknown, with estimates ranging from "dozens" to 200+. (Note: Hashem Abushama, According to Whose Archives?: The Tantura Massacre and Revisionist Israeli Historiography, January 30 2022, Institute for Palestine Studies. https://www.palestine-studies.org/en/node/1652421 "There also remains a mass grave. [...] It reportedly contains between a few dozens to more than 200 buried corpses of Palestinian men who were massacred") (Note: Blackwell, Sue. "Review Essay: States of Denial." Holy Land Studies: A Multidisciplinary Journal, vol. 6 no. 1, 2007, p. 113-118. Project MUSE, https://dx.doi.org/10.1353/hls.2007.0016. "Ilan Pappé [...] has documented in detail the massacre of some 200 men, women and children at Tantura on 22–23 May 1948") (Note: Morris 2004. "Dozens of villagers were killed.) (Note: Nur Masalha, 2012, The Palestine Nakba: Decolonising History, Narrating the Subaltern, Reclaiming Memory. Quotation: "Al-Tantura, 22–23 May 1948: between 70 and 200 Palestinian civilians were killed (Fearn 2006: 424), in a large-scale, well-planned massacre") (Note: Haaretz, 27 Feb 2026, Adam Raz, Terror Was Needed to Make Arabs Leave: What the Israeli Army Did in 1948, Revealed: "A few dozen civilians were massacred in Tantura") (Note: Jawad, S.A. (2007). Zionist Massacres: the Creation of the Palestinian Refugee Problem in the 1948 War. "Casualties, including those killed in battle and those massacred, are estimated to be between 52 and 85") (Note: John Pilger, New Statesman, 6/3/2002, Vol. 131, Issue 4590. "In May 1948, more than 200 Palestinians were killed by the advancing Jewish militia in the coastal village of Tantura, south of Haifa.")

After the massacre, most of the village was destroyed and its residents were expelled, forming a part of the broader expulsion of Palestinians during the 1948 war and the Nakba. Many of the women and children were transported to the nearby town of Furaydis. The Israeli kibbutz and beach resort of Nahsholim was established on the site of the depopulated village. The victims were buried in mass graves, one of them presently beneath a parking lot for the nearby Tel Dor beach.

Initially, there were few reports of the massacre and oral testimonies by surviving Palestinians were met by skepticism by some historians. A 1998 thesis by an Israeli Haifa University graduate who interviewed Israeli veterans and survivors, brought international attention to the massacre and caused an academic debate and controversy. The Israeli New Historians, most prominently Ilan Pappe, affirmed that a massacre had taken place. In a 2022 Israeli documentary film called Tantura, several Israeli veterans interviewed said they had witnessed a massacre at Tantura after the village had surrendered. In 2023, Forensic Architecture published its commissioned investigation of the area and concluded that there were three potential gravesites in the area of the Tel Dor beach that were connected to a massacre.

== Background ==
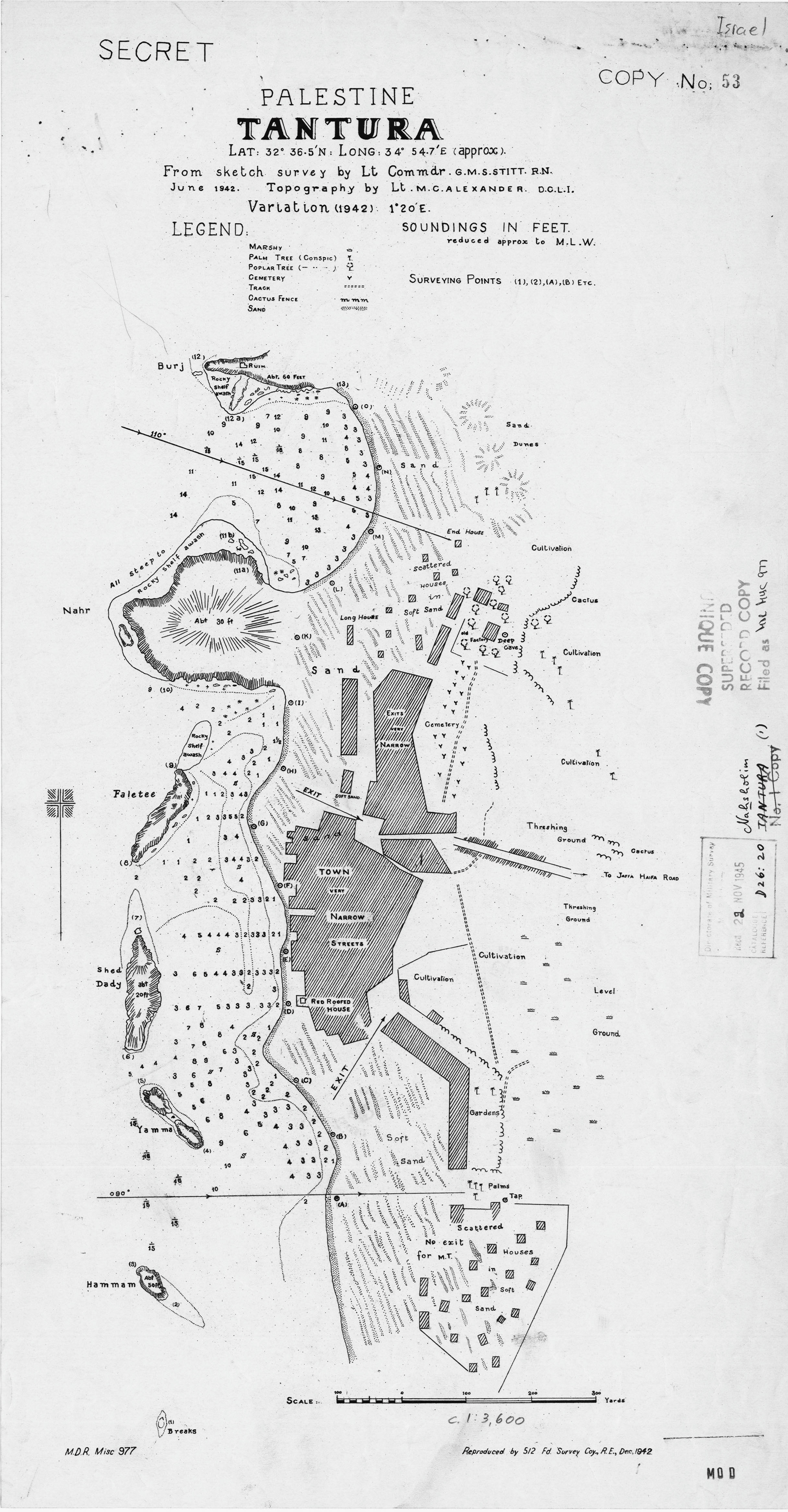
Detailed map of Tantura in 1942.

Tantura was a Palestinian village within the territory assigned to a Jewish state in the 1947 United Nations Partition Plan for Palestine. It had a population of 1,500.

As part of Plan Dalet, formulated in March 1948, ahead of the 14 May 1948 Israeli Declaration of Independence, the Haganah assigned the Alexandroni Brigade for the "occupation of al-Tantura and al-Furaydis". Of the brigade's four battalions, the 33rd was assigned to Tantura.

== Massacre ==
On the night of 22–23 May 1948, Tantura was attacked by the 33rd Battalion of the Alexandroni Brigade. The attack began with heavy machine gun fire, followed by an infantry attack from all landward sides as an Israeli naval vessel blocked off any chance of escape to the sea. The villagers put up fierce resistance but the battle ended by 0800hrs on 23 May.

Palestinian historian Walid Khalidi writes that Nimr al-Khatib provided "much detailed evidence" of "the methodical shooting and burial in a communal grave of some forty young men in Tantura village." Israeli historian Ilan Pappé wrote that in addition to executions, a number of villagers were killed in "a killing spree inside the houses and in the streets."

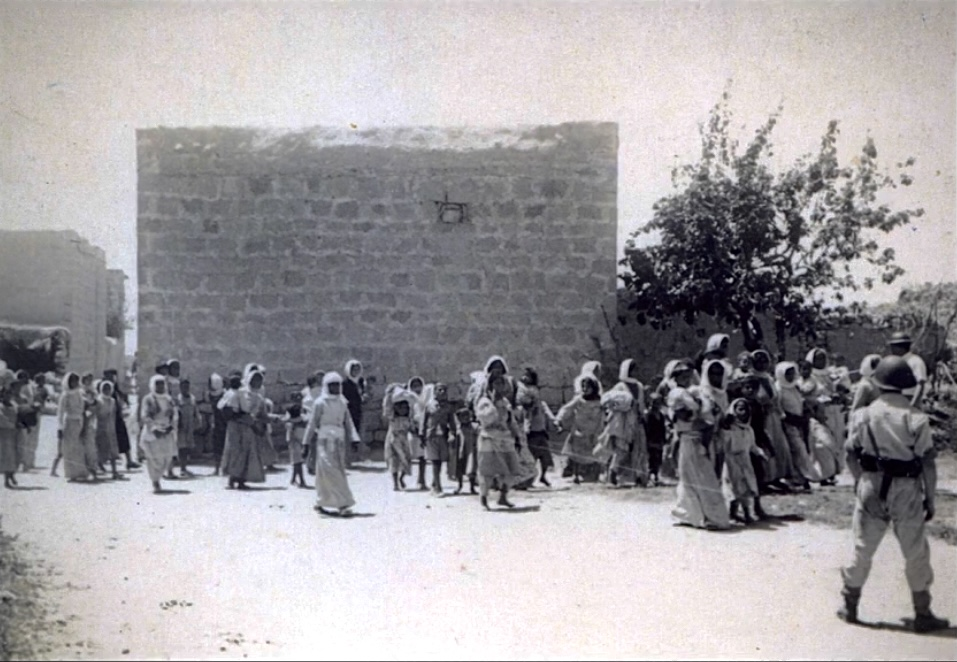
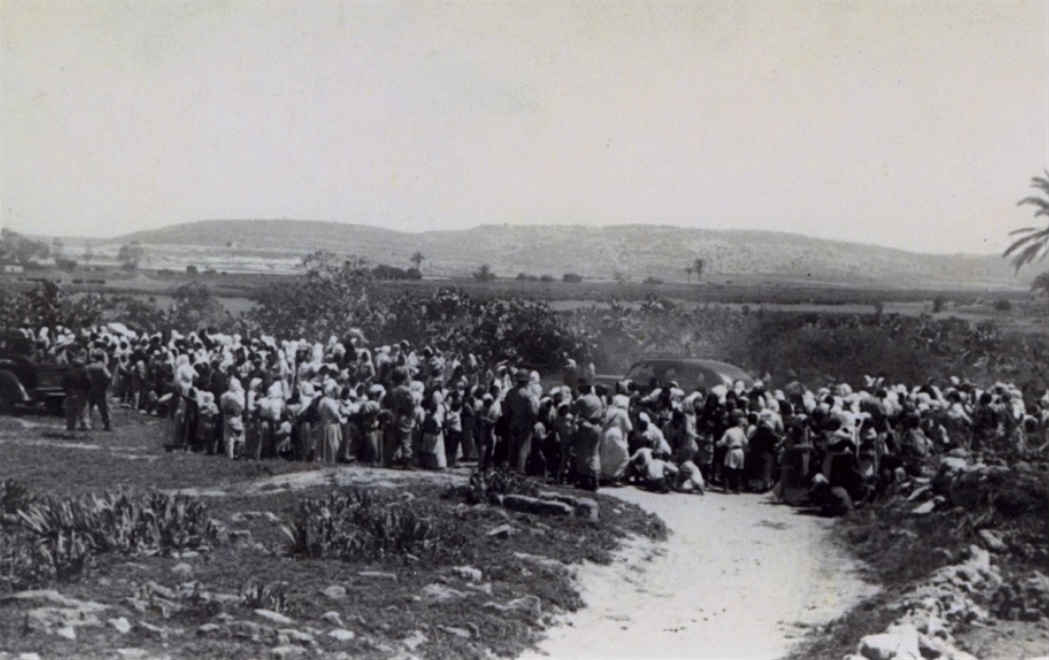
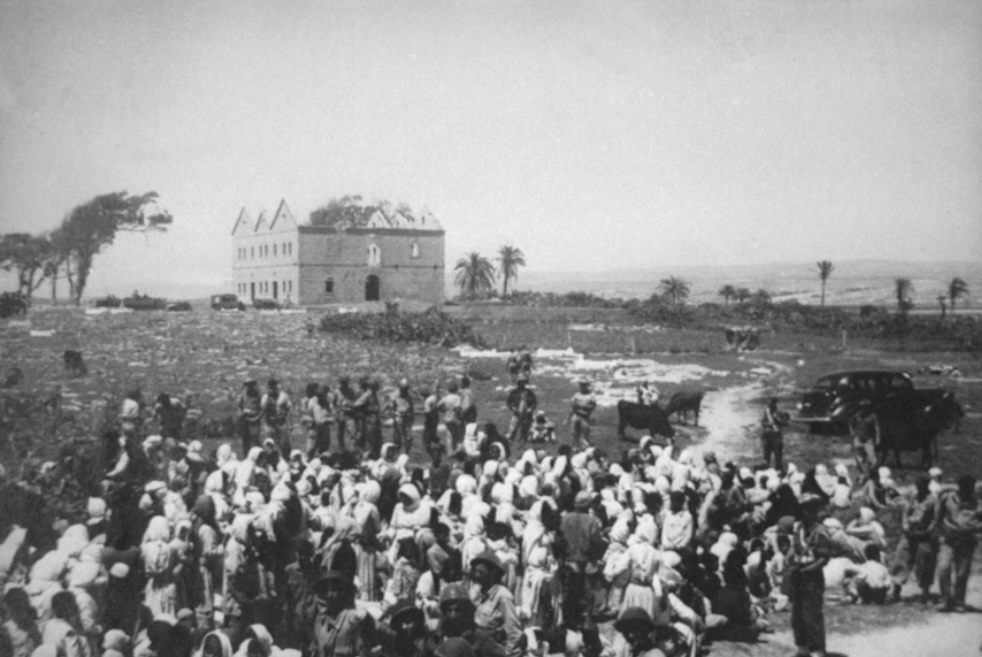
Israeli soldiers with detained women and children in Tantura, 23 May 1948.

Muhammad Abu Hana, who was a child at the time of the events in Tantura recounted:

By morning, the shooting had stopped and the attackers rounded everyone up [...] the women and children on one side, the men on the other. [...] the soldiers led groups of men away, and you could hear gunfire after each departure. [...] I saw bodies piled on a cart pulled by men of Tantura who emptied their cargo in a big pit. [...] On the road, near the railroad tracks, other bodies were scattered about.

Yaacov Epstein, a member of the local council of the nearby Jewish village of Zichron Yaacov, was a friend of Tantura's mukhtar and attempted to intercede on behalf of the villagers. In 2002, The News & Observer interviewed Jawdat Hindi, a daughter of Tantura's mukhtar, who said that Epstein arrived and shouted at the Jewish soldiers, and that at a later point, "he was crying, saying that we did not expect such a day and such a happening to our neighbors". Ilan Pappé writes that Yaacov had "managed to call a halt to the orgy of killing in Tantura, but 'he came too late', as one survivor commented bitterly."

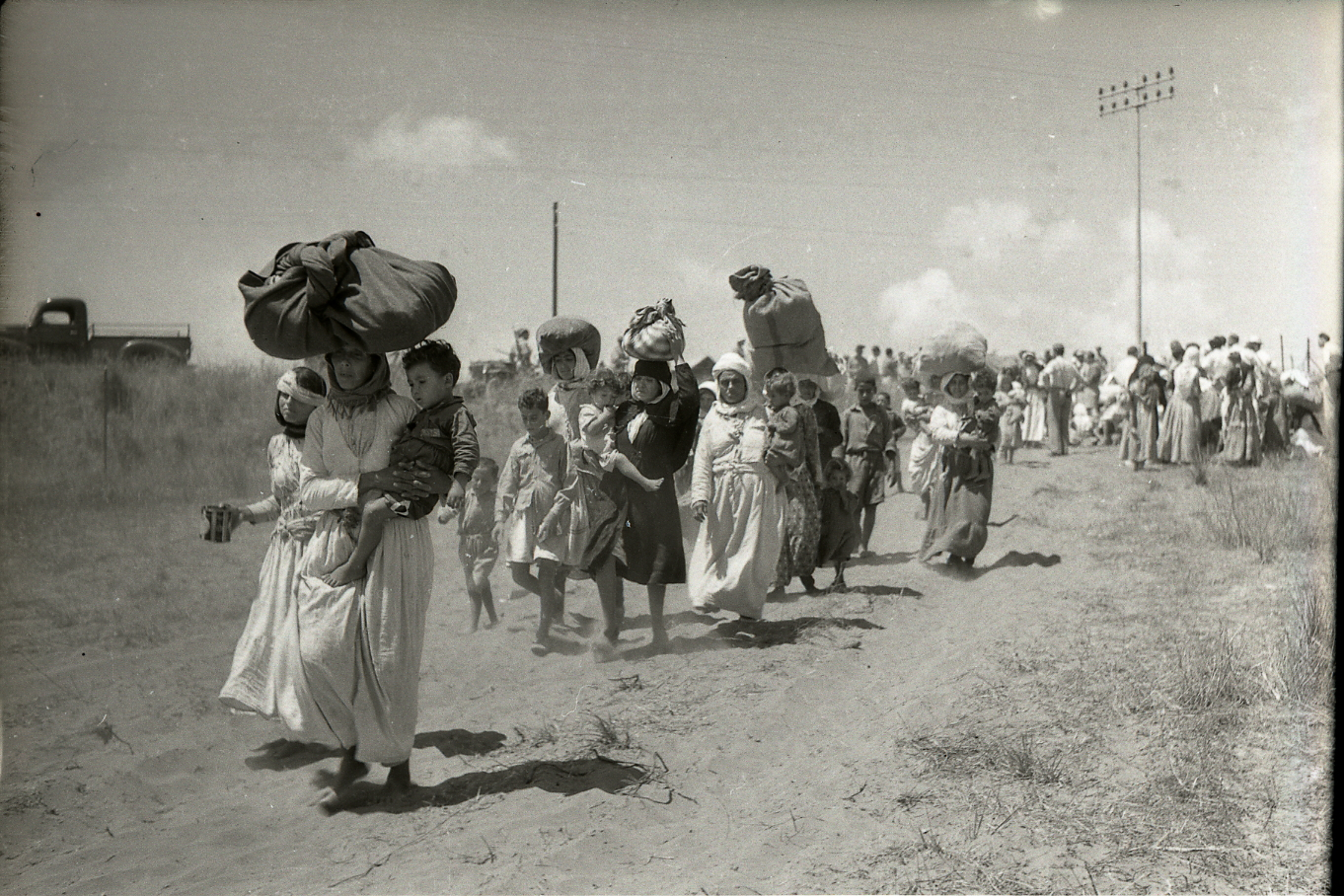
Women and children being expelled from Tantura, June 1948

After the massacre, the women and children were expelled to Furaydis, a neighboring village. The surviving men were placed into prison camps and later left Israel through prisoner exchanges, with their families following. Many of the survivors ended up living in the Yarmuk refugee camp in Syria.

Historian Saleh Abdel Jawad writes that executions of prisoners from Tantura also took place in detention centres after the massacre.

== Analysis and historiography ==
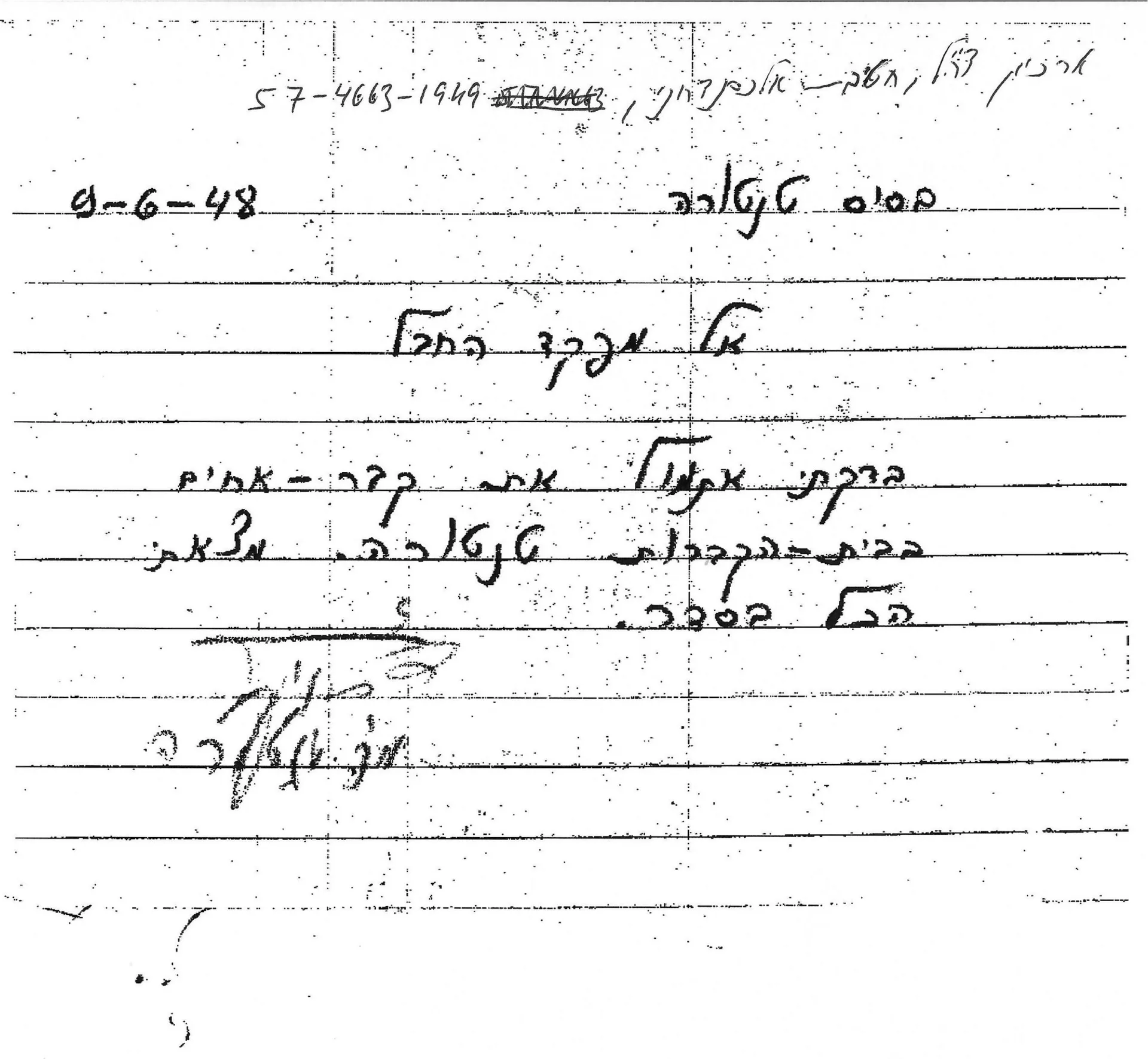
An IDF document dated June 9, 1948 that reads "To the region commander. Yesterday I checked the mass grave in Tantura cemetery. Found everything in order."

Nimr al-Khatib was the first to write about the massacre, having done so in 1951. (Note: Basma Fahoum, Arie M Dubnov, Agnotology in Palestine/Israel: Tantura and the Teddy Katz Affair Twenty Years On, The American Historical Review, Volume 128, Issue 1, March 2023, Pages 371–383, https://doi.org/10.1093/ahr/rhad050. Quote: "Of Tantura, Palestinians early recorded a massacre. The earliest report is Min Athar al-Nakba, originally published in 1951 in Syria by Muhammad Nimr al-Khatib, a Muslim cleric and former member of the Arab National Committee in Haifa. His book includes a short account of the massacre by Marwan al-Yahya, testifying to a mass grave and the execution of some young people who had helped collect the bodies of the dead villagers. Al-Khatib noted that Tantura's residents, like those of Deir Yassin, were ashamed to tell of these atrocities.") In 1961 Walid Khalidi wrote of "methodical shooting and burial in a communal grave of some forty young men in Tantura village."

Research on the event was expanded upon by further testimonies gathered by Mustafa al-Wali from tens of interviews that were published in the Summer 2000 issue of Majallat al-Dirasat al-Filastiniyya, a quarterly of the Journal of Palestine Studies.

=== Katz controversy ===
In January 2000 Israeli journalist Amir Gilat published an article about the events at Tantura in Ma'ariv, (Note: Eye witness accounts from: Dan Vitkon, Yosef Graf, Salih 'Abn al-Rahman, Tuvia Lishansky Mordechai Sokoler, Ali 'Abd al-Rahman Dekansh, Najiah Abu Amr, Fawsi Mahmoud Tanj, Mustafa Masr.) that drew heavily on the 1998 thesis of Haifa University's Theodore Katz, who had interviewed Israeli veterans and survivors. Following the publicity, Alexandroni Brigade veterans protested, and Gilat wrote a follow-up piece including their denial that a massacre had occurred. The veterans subsequently sued Katz for libel (asking for 1 million shekels, or $321,000, in damages).

In the resulting court case, after two days' cross-examination, Katz agreed to an out-of-court settlement that involved him signing a statement nullifying the conclusions of his research, namely that extrajudicial killings were committed after the surrender of the village. The next day at court, Judge Drora Pilpel announced the case closed. Katz, however, then attempted to rescind his statement, explaining that he had signed it in a "moment of weakness that he already deeply regretted", and that it "did not represent what he really felt about his work". After several further hours of deliberation, Judge Pilpel upheld the decision to close "based on her conviction that a contract between parties must be respected, though "she emphasized that her decision did not relate in any way to the content, accuracy or veracity of the libel suit". Katz subsequently appealed to the Supreme Court, which upheld the decision of the lower court for the same reasons.

In the wake of this case, the University of Haifa suspended Katz's degree, which had originally received a grade of 97%, but allowed him to revise and resubmit his thesis. Katz's revised thesis was re-evaluated by five examiners appointed by the university, a majority (3:2) of whom failed it. Katz was subsequently awarded a "non-research" MA.

==== Academic commentary ====
The historian Ilan Pappé supported Katz and his thesis, and has challenged the Israeli veterans to take him to court, saying he has evidence that the massacre occurred. In a 2001 article in the Journal of Palestine Studies, Pappé defended the use of oral history, and pointed out that Katz based his research not only on testimony from Palestinian villagers, but also from Israeli soldiers. Pappé provided new evidence that had come to light after Katz had presented his thesis, in one case quoting from "a document from the Alexandroni Brigade to IDF headquarters in June" which read "We have tended to the mass grave, and everything is in order", and in another, citing published testimonies by eyewitnesses who had been located in Syria. He also related the background to Katz's original signed repudiation of his thesis.

In 2004, Israeli historian Benny Morris extensively reviewed the Tantura controversy and recounted himself coming away "with a deep sense of unease". He suggested that, while it is unclear whether or not a massacre occurred, there was no doubt that war crimes were committed by the Jewish forces and that the village was forcibly cleansed of its Arab inhabitants. Morris believes that one village woman was raped, Alexandroni troops may have executed POWs and there may have been some looting, based on an army report that uses the Hebrew word khabala (sabotage).

Morris underlined the fact that in interviews conducted by himself and by the Ma'ariv reporter Amir Gilat, all refugees confirmed that a massacre had taken place, while all IDF veterans denied it. Regarding the latter, Morris describes what he calls "troubling hints", such as a diary by an Alexandroni soldier, Tulik Makovsky, in which he wrote "… that our boys know the craft of murder quite well, especially boys whose relatives the Arabs had murdered... or those harmed by Hitler [they are the same fascists]. They took their private revenge, and avenged our comrades who had died at their hands, against the snipers". Morris also noted that, given the political sensitivities at the time, the word khabala ("sabotage") may have been used as a euphemism for a massacre.

Morris further pointed out issues with the scoring of the second version of Katz's thesis in that the two referees who gave anomalously low scores had been co-authors of an IDF book which said of the July 1948 expulsions and massacres at Lydda and Ramle that "the Israeli Army had carried out only a 'partial expulsion' of the populations" and which "dismissed the charge that the troops had massacred Lydda townspeople", whereas records from the IDF archive show that a full-scale expulsion had been carried out and that Yiftah Brigade troops had killed some 250 townspeople in Lydda.

Morris later wrote that before the village surrendered, there was an intense battle. Fourteen of the attackers and more than seventy villagers were killed in the fighting. He believed documentary evidence showed prisoners of war had been murdered, and that the village inhabitants had been expelled, but not that a large scale massacre had occurred. He cited archival records reporting most of the deaths taking place during the fighting.

There were plans in 2004 to exhume bodies from a site between Nahsholim and Dor believed to be a mass grave, but this has not happened.

In 2006, Katz's presentation of the facts was disputed again by the Israeli historian Yoav Gelber who was to play a key role in the efforts to discredit Katz's research. Gelber called the allegations of a massacre a blood libel.

=== 2022 documentary ===
In January 2022, a documentary film on the subject by Alon Schwarz called Tantura was screened at the 2022 Sundance Film Festival. Several Israeli veterans interviewed said they had witnessed a massacre at Tantura after the village had surrendered. Many of the interviewees gave descriptions, with the numbers of victims who were shot dead from "a few" to "several dozen" or "more than 200". The latter estimate was provided by a resident of Zikhron Ya'akov who stated he had helped bury the victims. They affirmed that soldiers in the Alexandroni Brigade had murdered unarmed men after the battle had ended, and the victims were indeed buried in a mass grave, now located under the Dor Beach parking lot near Nahsholim kibbutz. Some of the soldiers interviewed denied a massacre had taken place. The screening also prompted entities including the Palestinian Authority and the editorial board of Haaretz to call for a commission to investigate another alleged mass grave site near Mount Carmel.

University of Haifa history professor Yoav Gelber told Schwarz in Tantura that Katz's thesis was flawed due to its heavy reliance on oral testimony, and later criticized the film after it was screened due to what The New York Times paraphrased as "a paucity of other documentation [besides oral sources]." This criticism and others about the film were also made by Benny Morris. The family of one of the veterans interviewed accused Schwarz of misrepresenting the veteran's account, and another veteran said a massacre had happened but told The New York Times that the Israeli soldiers had acted without orders.

In Tantura, Judge Drora Pilpel who presided over the court in which Theodore Katz had been accused years earlier, is shown listening to tapes with testimonies of soldiers from the Alexandroni brigade talking about having killed Arab civilians. Pilpel reacts by saying "This I never heard. If it's true, it is a shame...If he (Katz) had such things, he should have seen it through."

=== Forensic Architecture investigation (2023) ===
In 2023, after being commissioned by the Palestinian NGO Adalah, Forensic Architecture, a research agency based at Goldsmiths, University of London, investigated alleged burial sites in Tantura. The investigation used village surveys, archival photographs, aerial and satellite imagery, a memory sketch-map, ground-level photographs, survivor and veteran testimonies, and cartographic regression to produce a 3-D reconstruction of the village and its later landscape.

The report identified two earth features, designated E1 and E2, that Forensic Architecture assessed as "very likely" containing mass graves of residents executed after the battle on 23 May 1948. The report placed both sites in areas later used as tourist parking areas serving Dor Beach. It also assessed that a wall and courtyard near the beach possibly contained another mass grave, and that at least one mass grave likely existed inside the village cemetery, while stating that further work was needed to confirm the cemetery assessment. The investigation identified a second mass grave site and two more possible locations in the former village.
