= Nahsholim =

Kibbutz and resort in northern Israel

Nahsholim: נַחְשׁוֹלִים (Hebrew)
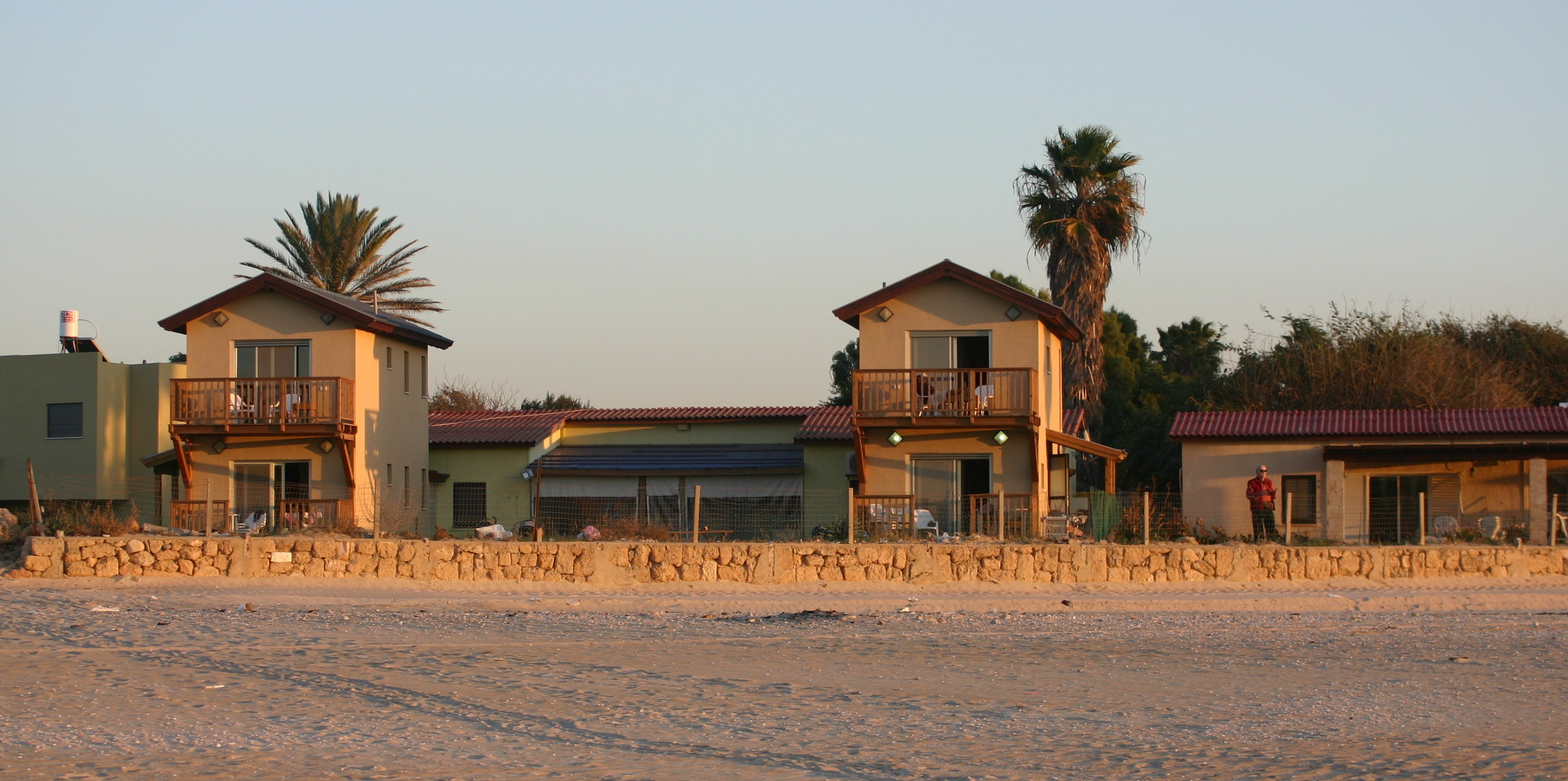
- Nahsholim

- Location within Haifa region of Israel Location within Israel
- Coordinates: 32°36′51″N 34°55′17″E
- Country: Israel
- District: Haifa
- Subdistrict: Hadera
- Council: Hof HaCarmel
- Affiliation: Kibbutz Movement
- Founded: June 1948
- Founder: Turkish Jewish immigrants and Israeli residents
- Population (2024): 717

Nahsholim (Hebrew: נַחְשׁוֹלִים, lit. 'Tidal waves') is a kibbutz and beach resort in northern Israel. Located near Zikhron Ya'akov, it falls under the jurisdiction of Hof HaCarmel Regional Council. In 2024 it had a population of 717.

== History ==
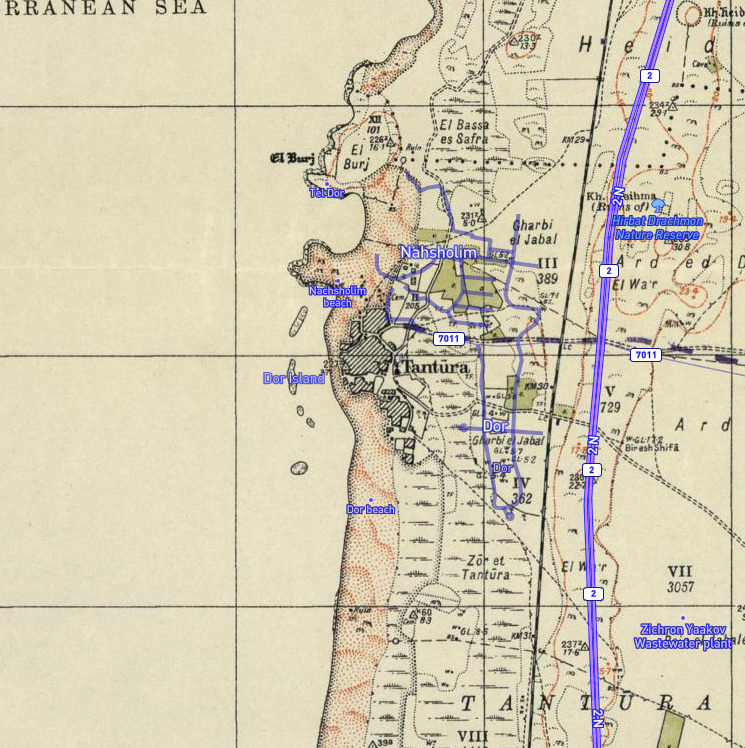
1940s Survey of Palestine map showing Tantura, with modern locations overlaid in blue

The kibbutz was established in June 1948 by a group of idealistic Zionists who settled at the site of the former Palestinian village of al-Tantura, emptied during the 1948 Arab-Israeli war after a battle, followed by a massacre of the Palestinians living there; the victims were put in mass graves. According to Forensic Architecture, the Israeli settlement of Nahsholim was established by migrants from Romania and Turkey. The earliest Israeli residents were Palmach members, but were soon joined by Holocaust survivors from Poland. In 1949 the residents wrote:

[W]e settled in Tantura and did not have to work much in order to start [a new life], only to use what existed here already... The beginning was the day when our group "Nahsholim” came and settled on the lands of the abandoned village Tantura and in its houses. The village was deserted. The property was abundant, and it was the time of the year to gather the crops. And these crops—listen, I shall not exaggerate if I say that we were somewhat dazed—the soil was fertile, the conditions comfortable, the sea and the beach incomparable, and overall [there were] limitless possibilities. We saw our dream coming true...

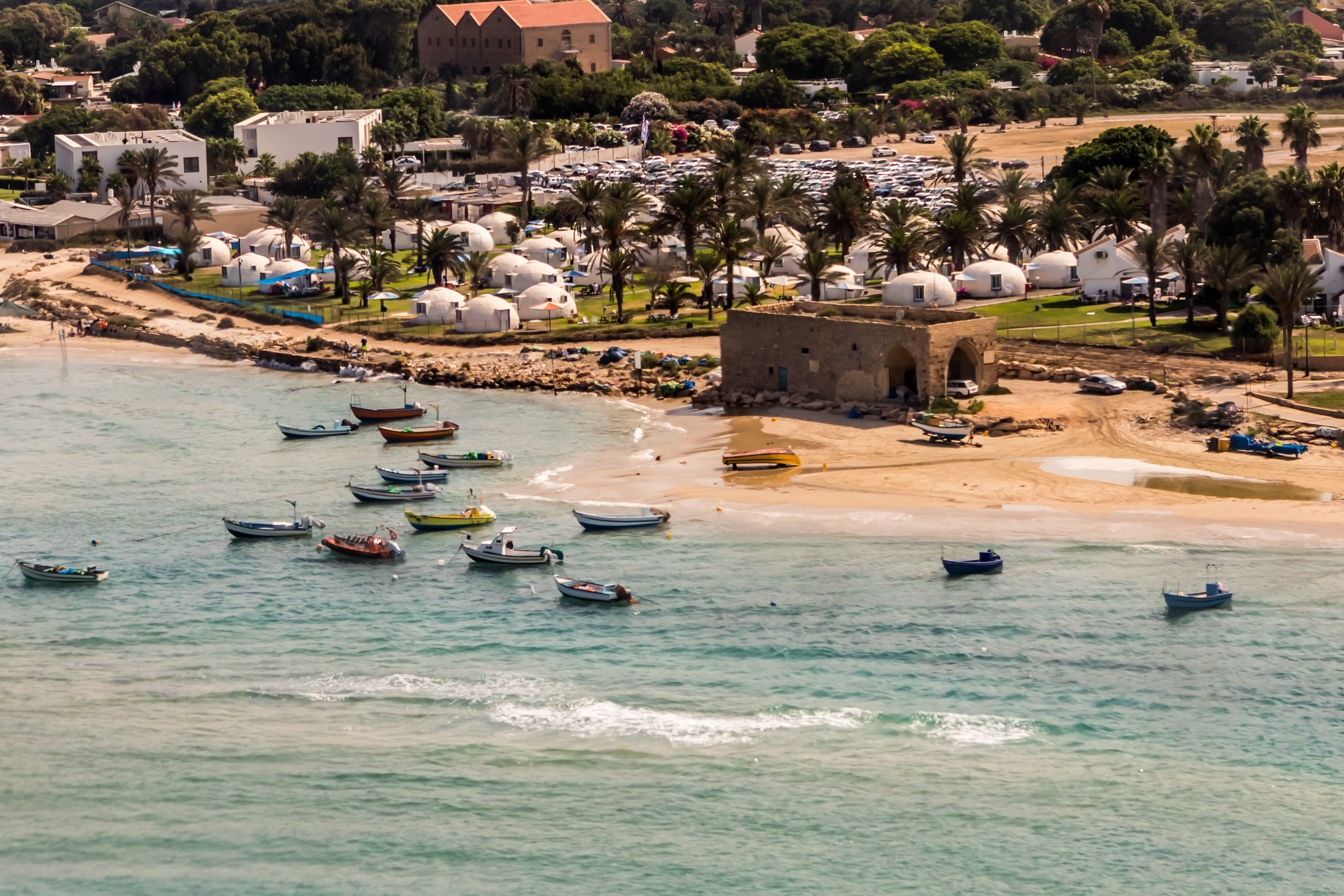
Nahsholim beach

The spacious former home of the mukhtar of Tantura served as the dining room. Other houses served as residences or as cowsheds, chicken coops or stables, workshops and sheds. Over the next decade, most of the houses of Tantura were destroyed and new buildings constructed on the northern side. The residents had wished to establish the kibbutz as a fishing village on El Burj, the site of ancient Dor, but gave up after a long fight with the Israeli Department of Antiquities.

A car park contains a mass grave from the 1948 Tantura massacre.

== Economy ==
A glass bottle factory founded by Baron Rothschild in 1891 is located in Nahsholim. Today it is an archaeological museum with displays of objects found in the excavations at Tel Dor since 1980. In 2015, archaeologists examining remains of a shipwreck discovered in 1976 off Dor Beach, near Zichron Yaakov, announced that it was probably a ship sent by Rothschild with supplies for the bottle factory. Also exhibited in the museum are a large assortment of anchors, jars and navigational tools retrieved by the center's diving team. Cannons, swords, guns and ammunition have been found underwater, dating from the retreat of Napoleon’s armade in 1799.

The kibbutz grows bananas, avocado and cotton, and raises fish in ponds. It also operates a plastics factory that manufactures irrigation equipment.

== Notable residents ==
- Ora Golan
