= Ibtisam =

Ibtisam Arabic: ابتسام, romanized: ibtisām is an Arabic ism "given name" meaning "smile". Among Arabic speakers, it is considered a woman's name, but among South Asian Muslims, it is also used as a male name. Notable people with the name include:

== Given name ==
- Ibtisam Barakat (born 1963), Palestinian-American writer, poet, and educator
- Ibtisam Lutfi (born 1950), Saudi Arabian female singer
- Ibtisam Mahameed (born 1960/61), Palestinian-Israeli peace activist
- Ibtisam Youssef Khalil Al-Nawafleh (born 1967), Jordanian legislator
- Ibtisam Sheikh (born 1998), Pakistani cricketer
- Ibtisam al-Samadi (born 1955), Syrian poet and academic

== See also ==
- Ibtissam
