= Bilal Musa and Susan Ibrahim =

Jordanian serial killers

Bilal Musa
- Born: Bilal Musa Muhammad; 1972; Zarqa, Zarqa Governorate, Jordan
- Died: December 7, 2000 (aged 28); Swaqa Prison, Amman, Amman Governorate, Jordan
- Cause of death: Execution by hanging
- Convictions: Murder x12 Robbery; Theft
- Penalty: Death (murders); Life imprisonment (other charges)

Details
- Victims: 12
- Span of crimes: 1994–1998
- Country: Jordan
- States: Amman, Zarqa
- Date apprehended: September 22, 1998

Susan Ibrahim
- Born: Susan Ibrahim Tawfiq; May 26, 1971; Zarqa, Zarqa Governorate, Jordan
- Died: November 5, 2001 (aged 30); Amman, Amman Governorate, Jordan
- Conviction: Murder
- Penalty: Death; commuted to life imprisonment

Details
- Victims: 12
- Span of crimes: 1994–1998
- Country: Jordan
- States: Amman, Zarqa
- Date apprehended: September 22, 1998

Bilal Musa Muhammad (Arabic: بلال موسى محمد; 1972 – December 7, 2000) and Susan Ibrahim Tawfiq (Arabic: سوزان ابراهيم توفيق; May 26, 1971 – November 5, 2001) were Jordanian serial killers who robbed and murdered twelve people around Jordan from 1994 to 1998. Musa was convicted, sentenced to death and executed for the murders in 2000, while Ibrahim died behind bars a year later.

Considered the country's first serial killers, some doubt has been cast on whether they were truly responsible for all of the murders, with allegations of them being framed by the police.

== Early lives ==
Bilal Musa Muhammad was born in 1972 in Zarqa into a poor family with twelve children. Little is known about his upbringing, but starting at age 14, Musa became an apprentice house painter. After graduating from university with a degree in accounting, he moved to Amman, where he found employment for a marketing company for tourist resorts in the Sweifieh district.

Susan Ibrahim Tawfiq was born on May 26, 1971, also in Zarqa. Much of her background is also unknown, but by the early 1990s, her family was residing in the house opposite of the Musa family. Having fallen in love with her, Musa constantly tried to court and talk to Ibrahim, despite the fact she was already married to a cousin of hers. Her marriage did not last long and she eventually divorced, allowing her to get into a relationship with Musa and the pair to eventually get married. Both families disapproved of their union, but this did not deter the spouses, who reportedly enjoyed traveling and hiking together, with Musa spending a majority of his money on luxury goods.

== Murders ==
=== Modus operandi ===
The exact circumstances behind why the couple started killing are unknown. Presenting themselves as real estate agents or salespeople, they visited random homes in the early mornings and would make up an excuse as to why they were there. If they determined that the occupant was alone or elderly, they would then break in, accost and proceed to kill them in a variety of ways including stabbing, beating the victims with chairs and slitting their throats. When finished, Musa and Ibrahim would burgle the residence, stealing money, jewellery and collectible items such as videotapes and cassettes, before fleeing the crime scene.

=== Murders ===
On January 5, 1994, Musa stalked 40-year-old Suad Farid until she went to her home in the Al-Rashid suburb. After memorizing the address, he and Ibrahim went there, knocked on the door and asked for a glass of water. When Farid turned around to get it, Musa rushed at her with a knife and stabbed her several times, killing her. He and Ibrahim then went inside, stealing 40 dinars, a gold chain and videotapes. After making sure there were no fingerprints left on the crime scene, the couple left.

Sometime later that same year, the couple went to the Abdoun neighborhood and knocked on the door of Laila Al-Shaer, pretending to be marketers for a magazine. After determining that she was alone, they went inside, where Musa strangled her with a telephone cord, before he and Ibrahim stole two gold rings, some chains and bracelets, then fled.

The couple would later admit to killing 20-year-old teacher Fatima Jamil, whose decomposing body was found in the Birin forest located in the Zarqa Governorate. They claimed that she had voluntarily gotten into their car, and that they had killed her for her money.

On March 27, 1995, the couple broke into the apartment of 23-year-old Maha Al-Masry, an Egyptian national living in the Shmeisani neighborhood of Abdali. When she came across the intruders, Musa stabbed her several times in the neck and chest and then strangled her to death. He then went to the adjacent room and strangled her 6-month-old child to death as well. After making sure there was nobody else inside, the pair put on gloves and searched through the drawers, stealing 18 dinars and a gold chain.

A short time after this, they broke into the apartment of 22-year-old Lina Burqan in Amman. The woman attempted to defend herself with a pistol, but was overpowered by Musa, who stabbed her to death. A couple of months later, 60-year-old Saeed Abu Khadija, a salesman of old clothes, started frequently visiting Ibrahim's mother's house so he could indirectly give money to Ibrahim. Feeling jealous, Musa lured the man to his own home, where he stabbed him to death and stole 24 dinars.

On November 18, the couple went to the office of 60-year-old businessman Najeh Al-Khayyat, intending to rob and kill him. After an initially cordial conversation, Al-Khayyat got into a heated argument with Musa, and in an attempt to calm him down, invited him to his bedroom - which was adjacent to the office - so they could talk it over. When they went in, Musa took out a knife and stabbed him, and to ensure that he was dead, hit Al-Khayyat on the head with a chair.

Almost two years later, in early 1997, Musa lured an elderly man named Rabih Abu Rukba to a banana grove in central Amman, where he stabbed him in the back. After the man fell to the ground, Musa continued stabbing him in the chest, killing him. Upon stealing his money, he calmly returned to his workplace.

A few months later, Musa and Ibrahim went to the house of 32-year-old Iman Al-Amayreh, who lived alone in the Al Hashmi Al Shamali neighborhood. Pretending to be salespeople for a holiday resort, they gave her a fake questionnaire to fill out her personal details, but while she was doing so, Musa took out a knife and stabbed her to death. The couple then stole 340 dinars from her home. Later that same year, Musa killed a 43-year-old Algerian woman named Saliha Makudi, stabbing her 18 times and then stealing her money.

=== Murder of Marouh Abdul Jalil ===
The couple's last known murder took place on May 26, 1998. On that date, they were invited to the house of Marouh Abdul Jalil Salameh - an elderly acquaintance of theirs - so they couple celebrate Ibrahim's birthday. Once they reached the man's home in Awjan, near Zarqa, they enjoyed the festivities until both had to excuse themselves - Ibrahim said that she wanted to use the outside toilet, while Musa claimed that he wanted to wash his hands. Once Jalil had turned his back on him, Musa attempted to choke him from behind, but the man resisted. He then got a knife and stabbed him several times, killing him in the process.

After Ibrahim returned, she helped her husband clean up and change clothes, before the pair started searching for any money and valuables. To their disappointment, they only found 31 dinars.

== Arrest, prosecution and deaths ==
=== Investigation, arrest, and confessions ===
On June 16, 1998, a letter was sent to the Public Security Directorate in Zarqa, in which the writer claimed that he had killed Jalil because the man had attempted to sexually assault his wife. The detailed description of the crime scene led Gen. Abdul Mahdi al-Damour to consider it genuine and send it to the forensic laborator. A couple of months later, scientists were able to determine that a fingerprint extracted from the letter belonged to Bilal Musa.

Soon after this revelation, the couple's house was raided, but police found nobody inside. Another letter was located in which it was made apparent that they had left Jordan on September 21, ostensibly for a work assignment in Benghazi, Libya. The couple were traced to a harbor in Sallum, Egypt, and with the help of Interpol and Libyan authorities, both were apprehended and returned to Jordan via Tunisia. Upon interrogation, the spouses admitted their responsibility for the crime, but Musa attempted to justify it by claiming that Jalil had attempted to assault his wife.

After a forensic examination determined that both were sane and able to stand trial, Musa and Ibrahim were charged with the twelve murders attributed to them. According to psychologists, there was no real motive behind the crimes, but some suspected that it was simply Musa having developed an addiction to killing.

=== Prosecution, sentences, and fates ===
Musa and Ibrahim were eventually put on trial for the twelve murders, but they denied responsibility for all except Jalil's killing, claiming that they had been coerced into confessing by the police. Their public defender attempted to convince the court that Jalil's killing was done out of righteous self-defense, but this suggestion was rejected and both were found guilty - Musa on all counts, while Ibrahim solely for Jalil's murder. The former was sentenced to death, while Ibrahim initially also received the same penalty, later commuted to life imprisonment with hard labor due to her pregnancy.

All of Musa's subsequent appeals were rejected, and on December 7, 2000, he was hanged at the Swaqa Prison in Amman in the presence of the Public Prosecutor, security officials and a doctor. Less than a year later, on November 5, 2001, Ibrahim died of a suspected heart attack while incarcerated.

=== Claims of innocence ===
Five years after Musa's execution, his brother and a team of investigators put forward the theory that he and Ibrahim were actually innocent of all murders except that of Jalil. They claimed that another murderer who had been arrested in 2004, Zuhair Al-Khatib, had confessed to killing Al-Khayyat and given a detailed confession of how he had carried out. In addition to this, they reiterated the claims that the spouses had been forced and threatened into confessing by the authorities, who supposedly just wanted to clear unsolved murder cases.

These claims were refuted by journalists and the police, who pointed out that Al-Khatib had claimed that he had killed Al-Khayyat by beating him to death with a hammer, while an autopsy had definitively determined that he had been stabbed with a knife. This, and the lack of strong evidence of a forced confession, has led doubts to the credibility of the innocence theory.

== See also ==
- List of serial killers by country
