= Ma'an List =

Together List قائمة معاً
- Founded: 1 August 2016; 9 years ago
- Headquarters: Amman
- Ideology: Social liberalism Social democracy Secularism
- Political position: Center-left
- Colours: Orange
- Slogan: Citizenry. Justice. Security.
- House of Representatives: 2 / 130

The Ma'an List (Arabic: قائمة معاً, romanized: Qāʾima Maʿan, lit. 'Together List') is a centre-left political movement and electoral list in Jordan. It has stood on a secular, reformist platform, and has articulated its stances on a variety of social and economic issues. The movement was established in 2016 just before the Jordanian general election held in September of that year. In that general election, the movement's electoral list won two parliamentary seats in the third district of the Jordanian capital, Amman. The two representatives are Kais Zayadin and Khaled Ramadan.

== Background ==
=== Political System and Democracy in Jordan ===
The political system of Jordan is a parliamentary monarchy based on the constitution of 1952. The head of state is the monarch, King Abdullah II, who has far-reaching powers. The Prime Minister and Council of Ministers are appointed by king. Furthermore, the king has the power to declare a state of emergency and retains the power to promulgate and ratify laws, direct the enactment of regulations, ratify treaties and agreements, declare war, conclude peace. The monarchy also has right to dissolve and reconvene the parliament.

There is a bicameral parliamentary system in Jordan. The lower house, the House of Representatives, Chamber of Deputies, or Majlis al-Nuwaab, consists of 130 members, elected by universal suffrage, while the upper house of the Senate, House of Notables, or Majlis al-Aayan, comprises 65 members all of whom are appointed by the king. Within the House of Representatives there are 15 seats reserved for women, and 12 for Christian, Chechen, and Circassian candidates, and the members serve 4 year terms.

Despite the elections that take place, democracy is not one of the basic tenets of system and the king has far-reaching authority in the governance of the country. One of the challenges of democracy in Jordan derives from the electoral system itself. The Jordanian one-person, one-vote version of the single non-transferable voting system was formulated to heavily favour tribal and other narrow interest groups over candidates or parties running on ideological/political platforms. The new Election Law of 2015 was intended to alleviate some of these issues, but it has been argued that the system continues to be plagued with problems. Additionally, cheating and bribery have been found to take place in elections, for example in the case of the former head of the General Intelligence Directorate, Muhammad Dhahabi. Moreover, the king has influence in the judicial system. The chief justice is appointed by the king, while other judges are nominated by higher council and approved by the king.

Though some democratic reforms after the Arab Spring and 2011 protests in Jordan, the king did not lose his authority in the state governance. The wide authority of the king and electoral system continue to be the main obstacles to democracy in Jordan. According to Freedom House, Jordan is ranked as the 4th freest Arab country, and as "partly free" in the Freedom in the World 2017 report.

=== Secularism in Jordan ===
The state religion in Jordan is Islam, and 93% of the population is estimated to be Sunni Muslim. The history of secular and leftist politics in Jordan has changed over time. There have been several decades of pro-reform activism over the years but with little effective change. From the 1950s to the 1970s the strongest opponents to the Hashemite regime were Arab nationalists and leftists, whose organisations and parties were severely repressed during that time. As the influence of their ideologies declined in recent years, some groups threw their support behind the state, while others continued to oppose it. By 1988, however, the most potent opposition force had become Islamist groups, along with the "usual suspects" of leftists and Palestinians. Aside from the Islamist parties, the political parties have often been seen as weak.

Tahir al-Masri's 1991 cabinet heavily represented leftist and secular deputies in order to contain the growing power of Islamists, co-opt moderate Palestinians, and deepen liberalisation processes. This government was toppled over negotiations with Israel, but marked an attempt by the monarchy to neutralise secular forces in Jordanian society.

The government's current position is that a civil state is not the same as a secular state, and that religion should not be detached from the public sphere.

=== Related Parties and Movements ===
==== Historic Movements ====
There have been a number of political parties and movements in Jordan that have espoused secular, nationalist and progressive aims. Communist parties have existed in Jordan since the country's establishment. The Jordanian Communist Party (JCP) founded in 1951. The party follows Marxist and Leninist ideologies. JCP is considered the oldest and strongly rooted parties in Jordan and had a large following during the 1950s and 60s. However, after suffering ideological cleavages, the party has largely been limited in its scope.

While Arab Nationalist parties in Jordan had often sought to highlight the historical connections between Arabism and Islam, the Ba'ath parties in Jordan took a different stance. They advocated ardently for Arab secularism, and as such, were able to appeal to both Arab religious minorities and Sunni Muslims who wanted a secular state. Ba’athist parties include the Arab Ba'ath Progressive Party and the Jordanian Arab Socialist Ba'ath Party, both reached official licensing in 1993, though active unofficially since 1947. The Arab Ba’ath Progressive Party seeks the unity of an Arab nation with a strong democracy and the rule of law, while the Jordanian Arab Socialist Ba’ath Party include a socialist economic model in their aims. Both parties continue to operate in Jordan though their activities have been limited, for example, participating in the 2011-12 protests.

==== Contemporary Movements ====
In the contemporary context, the Jordanian Social Left Movement was established in 2007 to serve as a platform for leftists and democrats from diverse backgrounds. It grew out of the activities of the Dhiban Youth Committee and attracted a high number of leftist and you activists when it was first created. The movement stated its aims in some of the same areas the Ma'an movement has now taken up, including health, education, taxation, and employment along a broadly left-wing platform.

Hirak refers to the non-traditional political movements that emerged in 2011. As the initiators of hirak in Jordan, the Jordanian Social Left Movement's mandate reflected much of the reform desired by left-leaning parties and movements in Jordan, and the movement was one of the first to participate in the protests in 2011. The different movements within hirak were largely fragmented, and therefore struggled to successfully advocate for their reformist agenda. Even so, it increasingly became possible to speak of hirak as a more cohesive, single movement, which formed a left-wing opposition to the government throughout 2011. Since that time, the movement has fragmented due to the domestic and regional political developments.

Other, similar initiatives have also emerged in recent years, including Shaghaf (Youths for an Active Tomorrow) and Taqaddam, demanding a “democratic, progressive, productive, green and secure Jordan”. These grassroots organizations have diverse aims, rooted in progressive democratisation. In the context of the 2016 general election, Shaghaf sought to position itself as a youth alliance working to ensure that political parties kept their promises in the aftermath of the election. Meanwhile, Taqaddam describes itself as a citizen-driven platform working for change to create a "democratic, progressive, productive, green and secure Jordan".

In the parliament there have also been some attempts to promote a more reformist agenda. The legislative block Mubadarah has worked towards such goals, beginning with pressure on the government to give civil rights to the children of Jordanian women married to foreigners. As of April 2016, Mubadarah was considering moving towards full political party status.

== History ==
The vision of Ma'an Movement started prior to the general election. The list was formed by individuals from a variety of different political backgrounds. It was intended to face the tribal-Islamic coalition through the idea of a civil state and a lack of emphasis on religion. As Kais Zayadin, one of the founders said, “Ma'an was the creation of some people who wanted to change Jordan". The official establishment took place in August 2016 prior to the 2016 general election. On 26 August 2016, the Ma'an movement held an event in the Shmeisani neighbourhood of Amman, in which establishment of the Ma'an electoral list was announced. The event was attended by more than 4,000 people, including many young people. In the event the leaders outlined their position, which included freedom and dignity for all, as well as justice among all members of society, including men and women.

The stated goal of Ma’an movement is to create a state that provides freedom and dignity which is based on citizenship, equality, and security for all its citizens, regardless of their gender, origin, religious beliefs, or ideology. They seek for citizens to be able to participate in a society where responsibilities and rights are equally-shared; in which equality is attained through the division of authorities and modern laws. They argue that these will be able to save the economy from debt and transform Jordan into a country where people live securely. The Ma'an movement members state that they aim to separate religious authority from state authority and to protect the country and its citizens from "radical" beliefs. They also state that freedom of expression should be secured as an essential right for every citizen.

== Stances ==
The Ma'an movement describes itself as working towards the overall goal of the establishment of Jordan as a civil, secular state. Their ideas reflect some of the historic and contemporary movements that have been active in Jordan advocating for a similarly reformist, left-leaning, and secular platform. They focus on the obligations of both the state and the citizen in their "rights and duties", separation of powers, and secular laws. This extends to freedom of expression and freedom of the press, which they state to be "fundamental" within a democratic society. They have rejected the mixing of religion and politics that is often put forward by political candidates in Jordan, and instead emphasised the importance of pluralism in religion. Kais Zayadin articulated Ma'an's vision and stated that “we call for complete equality regardless of one's gender, religion, profession or nationality. This is in the constitution, however it is not really being practiced.” He further elaborated that a civil society as Ma'an envisages it involves “the rule of law between the citizen and the state is implemented in the correct manner”.

Zayadin has stated on the relationship between religion and politics that in Ma'an's view, “religion is something pure, politics is something dirty. They cannot be mixed together.” In an interview, Zayadin spoke about how the movement is aware of the fears that people have when it comes to secularisation. “Religion is quite involved in the everyday life of people. There are certain parties in Jordan that use religion in their own way to convince people of their political stance,” he said.

On a range of other issues, Ma'an List members have described their position. They have declared these on their website and through newspaper reports and television interviews.

=== Gender ===
The list has emphasised their focus on gender equality and the extension of justice within society to both men and women. They have stood on a platform to repeal certain laws, such as Articles 308 and 340, concerning violence towards women, and on reforming Jordanian nationality law in order to allow Jordanian women to pass on their nationality to their children.

=== Education ===
Ma’an list's position on education emphasizes the right to free education for all Jordanians. There have been many attempts in Jordan to reform the education system but many problems persist. The Ma'an movement has stressed the importance of developing the quality of education in public schools and universities. They have said they will aim to change the current curricula and replace them with ones that keep up with scientific development, and to incorporate educational tools to help students synthesize, analyze, and collaborate. They also have said they will seek to monitor tuition increase in schools and universities and support teachers and encourage them to do scientific research.

=== Investment ===
Ma’an movement establishers have stated that they will work on creating a stable economic environment in Jordan through encouraging investors and investment in Jordan. They have said they will also work towards securing the rights of the investor and citizens, by altering laws created by the Investment Commission in Jordan. They have said that laws protecting the rights of owners should be secured, and that the parliament should be able to observe and scrutinize the commission's actions, and ensure that investors are able to work easily in all ministries; getting rid of all the administrative and technical barriers facing investment.

=== Unemployment ===
The problem of unemployment is a significant challenge for Jordan as unemployment rates are soaring in the country. Ma’an aims to fight unemployment in society through laws and legislations that enable the creation of projects that provide youth with job opportunities. They have stated that they will also try to alter labor laws, increase minimum wage, and protect workers from forced labor and arbitrary expulsion from the workplace. Furthermore, they have said that the state has to facilitate financing small enterprises to provide most citizens opportunities to create private projects which do not need high capital or foreign investment. They have called for an increase in tax exemption for individuals whose income is less than 1000 JD/month.

=== Energy and Environment ===
Jordan imports around 90% of its energy at present. As a result, investment and diversification is needed in order to meet the growing population's energy needs in the coming years. Ma'an list establishers have stated that the government needs to focus more on environmental projects and ensure the flexibility of investment conditions for such projects . They have also said that the state needs to focus also on the use of renewable energy in all sectors, through laws that encourage all sectors to switch to renewable energy sources which would eventually decrease the expenditure on energy as well as protect the environment.

=== Corruption ===
Ma'an movement establishers have stated that they will seek to tackle the problem of corruption in Jordan. Studies have found that the problem is spread throughout the political, economic, and administrative scenes in Jordan, which stands in the way of investment and development. Ma’an have said that they will seek to guarantee the independence of official monitoring services financially and administratively, and enable civil society institutions to fight corruption through the establishment of transparency in the public and private sectors as well as improving laws that foster accountability and institutionalizing the role of the parliament regarding that aspect.

=== Substance Abuse ===
The Ma’an movement has drawn attention to the issue of drug and substance abuse in Jordanian society and articulated their position on how to tackle it. Drug and substance abuse has been found to be on the rise in Jordan, and therefore the movement argues it is an important issue to tackle. They have stated that they will work through multiple channels to eradicate the problem of drug abuse in society through the creation and implementation of appropriate awareness programs to all citizens. They have also said that they will seek to create effective and up-to-date rehabilitation centers.

== 2016 elections ==
In the 2016 general election in Jordan the Ma'an list won two seats in Amman's third district. The elected candidates were Khaled Ramadan and Kais Zayadin. The candidates won the seat for the Ma'an list and for the Christian quota in the district. The Ma'an movement had created a list specifically for the election in Amman and had run with the mandate of creating a "civil state" in line with its aims. Their slogan was "Citizenship, Justice, Security", with a strong focus against radicalisation and exploitation of religion in society. In response to the election's results, Zayadin stated that “the tremendous amount of support that we found was unbelievable from people all over Jordan who are extremely interested in the idea [of separating religion and politics]”. He added, “it is what I call the silent majority.”

Since the election the movement has focused on continuing to engage young people in Jordan and has been running sessions across the country to educate people on what a civil state would really mean. Zayadin said, “we need to explain the meaning of the civil state and the fact that it does not go against religion. On the contrary it protects religion.” Furthermore, they have been working on including young people in the Jordanian parliament so the voices of the significant youth population in Jordan can have their voices heard. Zayadin has said that the movement is already looking to expand its parliamentary successes at the next elections, stating that, “we want to have 10, maybe 20 members at the next parliament".

Despite the Ma'an list's electoral success, The New Arab has also reported that there were "no surprises, no heartaches and no steps forward" in the elections. The biggest opposition in Jordan continues to be the moderate Islamist parties. In the elections overall, turnout was around 36%, which is lower than in January 2013's elections and reports of apathy communicated by independent observers.

== Reception ==
=== Local ===
Ma'an List gained wide media attention from local news agencies since its members announced they were participating in the parliamentary elections. Local print newspapers like Al-Ghad, Al-Ra'i, Addustour, and Al-Sabil covered the list and its electoral program from different perspectives. Al-Ghad newspaper published articles by writers who support Ma'an movement, while Al-Sabil, which represents the Islamic Action Front, opposed Ma'an movement. Al-Ghad published an article in August, where the author, Marwan Mouasher, stated that "for the first time, people talked transparently about the civil state, democracy, and other goals that want to be achieved by the list". Members of the list talked about "working hard to achieve equality." He expressed his admiration of how the members of Ma'an list explicitly stated how they like music, theater, and the arts. He encouraged readers who believe in a civil state and democracy to vote for Ma'an list on election day. He also said that change can never happen overnight; yet it cannot be made if people do nothing on election day, asserting that a "democratic" civil society should have its "voice" heard.

=== Global ===
The Ma’an movement has not been extensively covered in the global media. It gained the most attention in the run up to the 2016 parliamentary elections where it put forward the Ma’an List. The Washington Post mentioned the list as an exception to the “generic trend” in the Jordanian elections. This was argued in reference to the list's explicit identity as a “civil state” list which argues for secular politics and the separation of religion from government. The Washington Post compared the Ma’an List to Taqaddam, another civil society organisation offering a progressive programme and voter guide, though not a formal list.

Middle East Eye also covered the Ma’an List and grassroots activist coalition in the run up to the election. It reported that the list had “shaken up” the election campaign and “raised eyebrows”. In the run up to the election Middle East Eye reported that Ma’an envisioned itself as a crucial actor in restricting the rise of the Muslim Brotherhood and the Islamic Action Front.

=== Controversy ===
The Ma’an movement has caused some controversy within Jordan. The secular politics and notion of a “civil state” that the movement espouses is at odds with the majority of political expression within the country. One of the movement's leaders, Kais Zayadin, clashed in a public debate with an Islamic Action Front candidate in the run up to the election. In this debate, Saleh Al-Armouti, a candidate from the Islamic Action Front, said that "secularism was the worst thing that the west brought us", while Zayadin stated that a civil state protects all religions. Al-Armouti equated dance and ballet to prostitution, since its against religion and Shari'a. He said that they (Ma'an list) are trying to reach the parliament through "pornography", and if dancers wanted to give him their votes, he doesn't want them. Zayadin answered by saying that, "we at Ma'an support music, the arts, music, and thinking."

Some of the list's slogans proved particularly provocative, including “no to the abuse of religion” and “against terrorism and extremism”. The Ma'an list's platform was the first time in Jordan's history that a list of candidates openly ran on a program to promote a civil, democratic, and secular state. Their victory in the two seats they won in the third district parallels the three seats an Islamist alliance won in the same district, highlighting the "conflicting social and cultural undercurrents" there, and in Jordan more widely. The leaders of the movement and the list have faced issues due to their policy positions. In particular, their call for the separation of religion and politics has brought death threats, including threats of beheading. In addition, the list found a large number of its supporters among those who have resented the status quo in Jordan, and have seen that patronage and tribal systems are still in use, as well as increased extremism in Jordan after the Arab Spring. This caused the establishers to come up with these slogans, where one of them states that a "civil state is the solution" as opposed to the historic Islamic movement's slogan "Islam is the solution". This confrontation between an old and well-established Islamic front – led by the Muslim Brotherhood and represented by the Islamic Action Front – and the Ma'an list led the Islamic Action front change their slogans, moving away from only saying "Islam is the solution".

== See also ==
- List of political parties in Jordan
- Elections in Jordan
- Religion in Jordan
- Parliament of Jordan
