= Palace of Justice, Amman =

Court building in Amman, Jordan

Palace of Justice
- قصر العدل
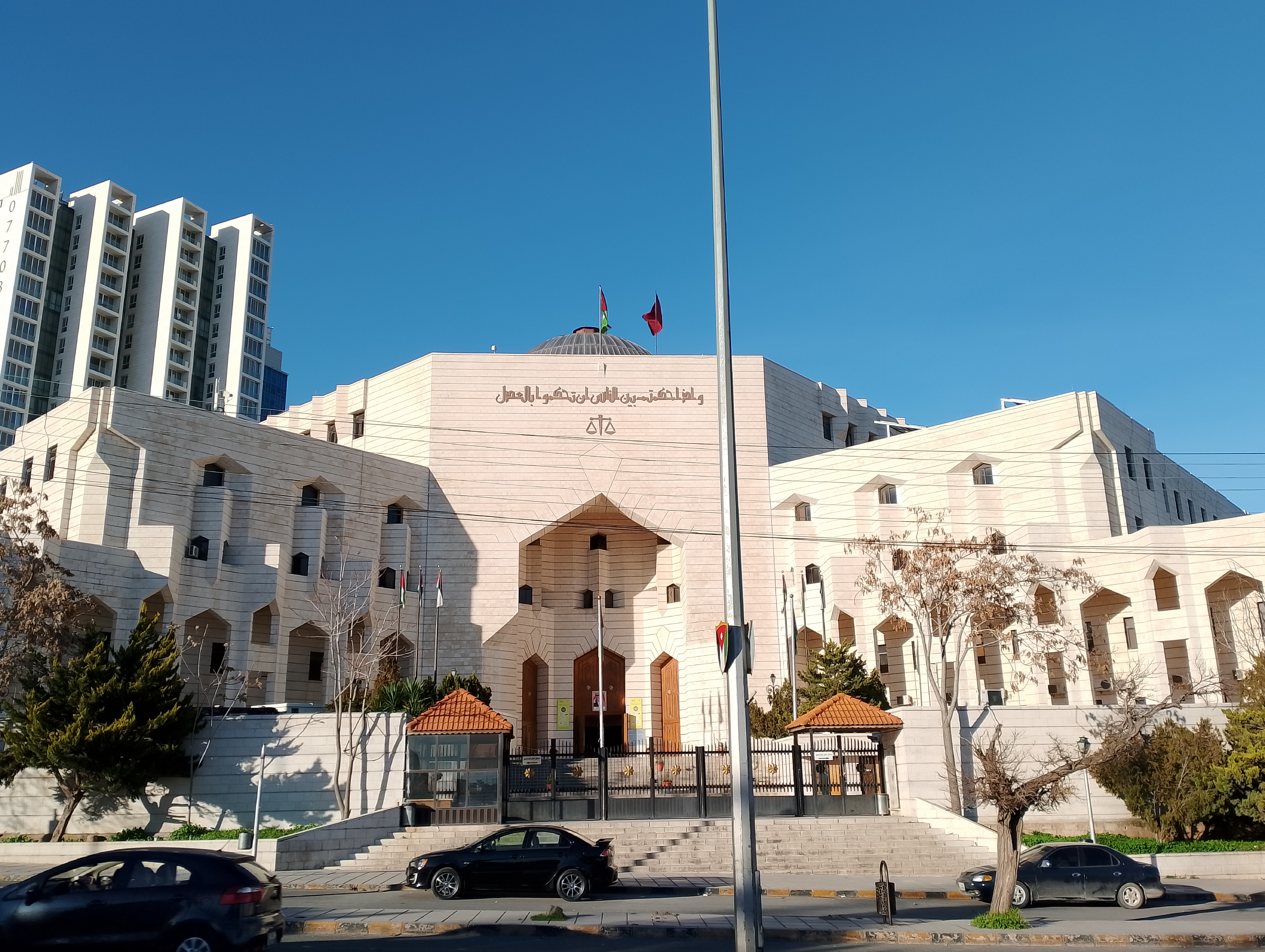
- The Palace of Justice seen from the south
- Click on the map for a fullscreen view

General information
- Location: Abdali area, Amman, Jordan
- Coordinates: 31°57′42″N 35°54′37″E

Technical details
- Floor count: 9

Other information
- Number of rooms: 60 halls and courtrooms

The Palace of Justice (Arabic: قصر العدل, romanized: Qasr al-Adl) is a significant judicial building located in Amman, the capital city of Jordan. This prominent structure serves as the primary headquarters for the judiciary in Amman and houses various courts and legal departments. The Palace of Justice is a symbol of the rule of law and the judicial system in Jordan.

It is located in the heart of Jordan's capital, Amman, in the Abdali district at Suleiman Nabulsi street. Originally founded in 1954 in Downtown Amman, it was relocated to Abdali in 2002, where it now stands in its present form with a total area of roughly 47,000 square meters. The design of the building draws inspiration from Islamic architectural styles.

The Palace of Justice holds significant importance in the Jordanian judicial system and plays a crucial role in upholding the rule of law in Amman and beyond. Its establishment has had a profound impact on the efficiency and accessibility of the judiciary, ensuring that justice is served promptly and fairly.

== History and construction ==
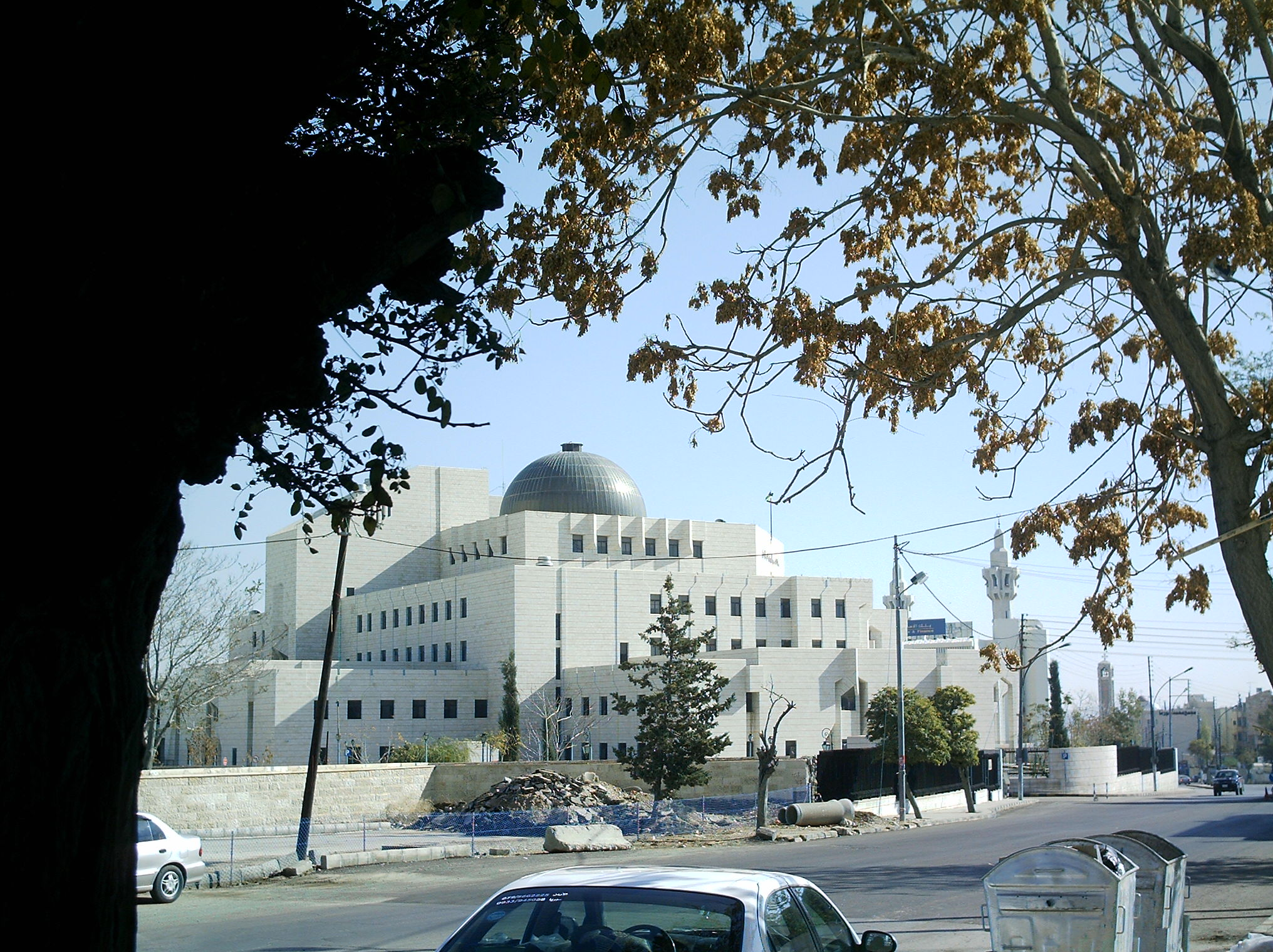
Palace of Justice building from the north side.

The concept of establishing a centralized judicial building in Amman dates back to the 1954 when Jordan was undergoing significant modernization and development. The Palace of Justice was constructed to consolidate various courts and judicial departments, providing a central location for legal proceedings and administrative functions.

The original Palace of Justice, inaugurated in 1954 on Salt Street in the heart of the country, Downtown Amman, covered an area of 3,600 square meters and featured three floors plus a basement. It previously housed the Grand Criminal Court, the Grand Criminal Prosecutor's Department, and the Amman Public Prosecutor's Department. However, the building now faces neglect following the relocation of these institutions to the Abdali area. Despite this, the Jordanian Ministry of Justice has allocated funds for its restoration.

=== Design and architecture ===
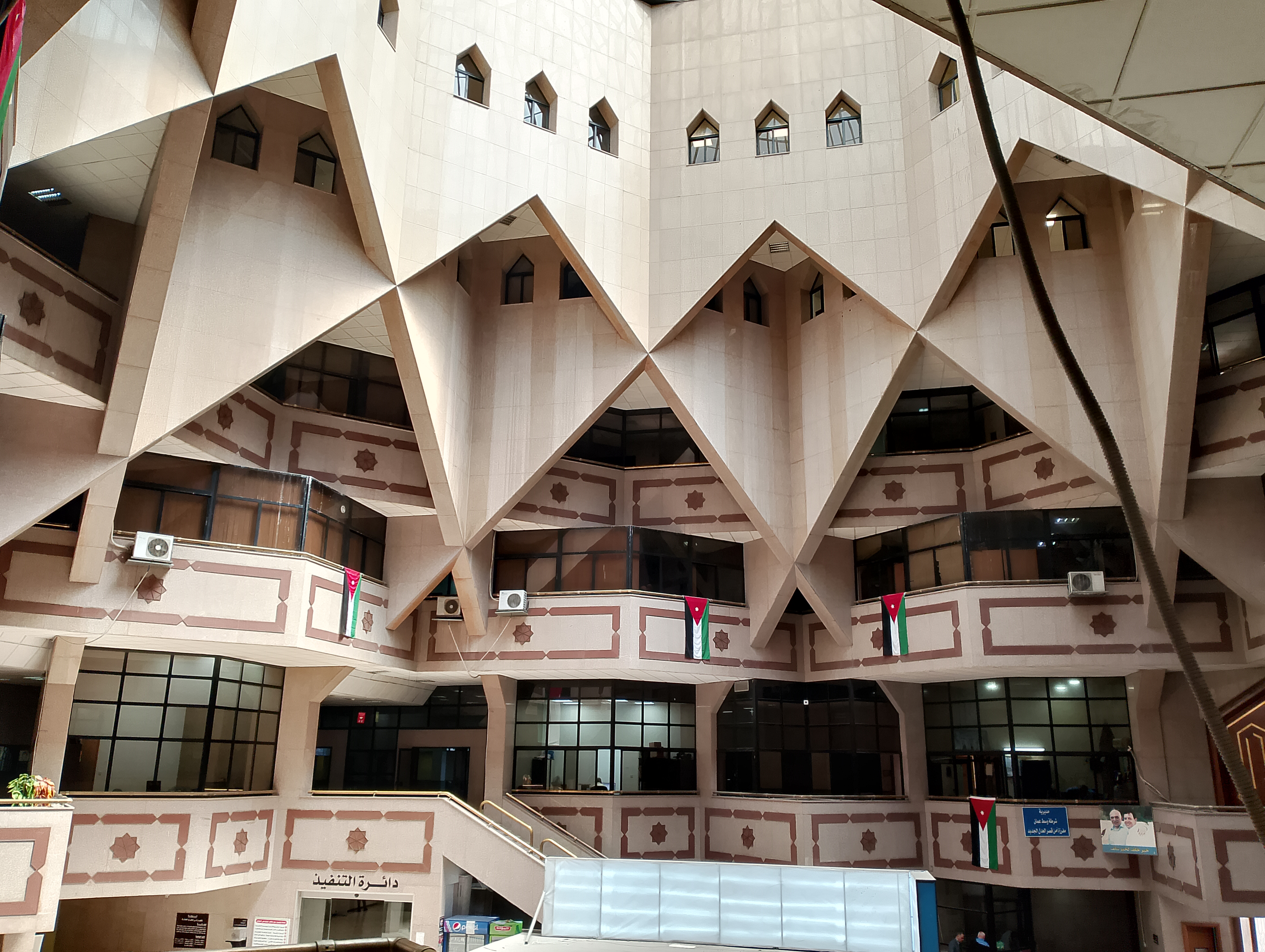
Interior view of the Palace of Justice

The architectural design of the Palace of Justice reflects a blend of traditional Jordanian and modern styles. The building's façade features elements of classical architecture, with grand columns and ornate detailing, symbolizing strength and justice. The interior of the building is designed to accommodate the needs of the judiciary, with spacious courtrooms, administrative offices, and public areas.

The building features eight floors and covers a total area of 47,000 square meters. It was constructed through a collaboration between the primary company and a partner firm. The architectural design is inspired by Islamic styles, with intricate stone arches and a central lobby adorned with ornate granite. The construction included civil, architectural, and electromechanical work, and the building is notable for its distinctive woodwork. It houses 60 courtrooms, each with wooden walls, counters, doors, and chapels, all decorated with unique geometric patterns. Additionally, all external work was completed to complement the building's overall design.

The design also incorporates elements that reflect the cultural heritage of Jordan, including intricate geometric patterns and traditional Arabic calligraphy. These elements not only enhance the aesthetic appeal of the building but also serve to connect the modern judicial functions with the rich cultural history of the region.

=== Construction phases ===
The construction of the Palace of Justice was carried out in multiple phases, beginning in the late 20th century. The initial phase focused on the main judicial building, while subsequent phases included the expansion of facilities and the addition of specialized courts. The construction process involved collaboration between local and international architects, engineers, and construction firms, ensuring the highest standards of quality and functionality.

== Functions ==
The Palace of Justice in Amman serves as the central hub for the judiciary in the capital city. It houses several key courts and legal departments, providing a wide range of services to the public and legal professionals.

=== Courtrooms and judicial offices ===
The building contains multiple courtrooms that cater to various types of legal proceedings, including civil, criminal, and administrative cases. Each courtroom is equipped with modern amenities and technology to facilitate efficient and fair trials. Additionally, the Palace of Justice houses the offices of judges, prosecutors, and administrative staff, ensuring that all judicial functions are conducted smoothly.

=== Legal departments and services ===
Apart from courtrooms, the Palace of Justice hosts several legal departments that provide essential services to the public. These include the registrar's office, which handles the filing of legal documents and the issuance of court orders, and the public prosecutor's office, responsible for prosecuting criminal cases. The building also contains facilities for legal aid services, offering support and representation to individuals who cannot afford legal counsel. The building comprises ten courts and judicial departments spread across 60 halls:

- Amman Court of First Instance (Arabic: محكمة بداية عمّان): Serves Jabal Al-Hussein, Al-Muhajireen, Al-Hashimi, Al-Nuzha, Jabal al-Ashrafieh, Jabal Al-Marrekh, Jabal Al-Taj, and Jabal Al-Natheef areas.
- Amman Magistrate Court (Arabic: محكمة صلح عمّان)
- Amman Appeal Court (Arabic: محكمة استئناف عمّان)
- Sharia Court (Arabic: محكمة القضايا الشرعية)
- Court of Cassation (Arabic: محكمة التمييز): Recently relocated from the Palace of Justice to a new building in Shmeisani.
- Supreme Court of Justice (Arabic: محكمة العدل العُليا)
- Department of Execution and Fees (Arabic: دائرة التنفيذ والأجرة)
- Execution Public Prosecutor Department (Arabic: دائرة مدعي عام التنفيذ)
- Amman Felonies Court (Arabic: محكمة جنايات عمّان)
- Amman Law Department (Arabic: دائرة حقوق عمّان)
