= Ibtissam =

Ibtissam (Arabic: ابتسام, romanized: ibtisām, also written Ibtissem) is a female Arabic name that means "smile". Notable people with the name include:

== Given name ==
- Ibtissam Lachgar (born 1975), Moroccan feminist, human rights activist, and LGBT advocate
- Ibtissam Tiskat (born 1992), Moroccan singer, songwriter and actress

== See also ==
- Ibtisam
