= 2016 Jordanian general election =

- 20 September 2016

All 130 seats in the House of Representatives 65 seats needed for a majority
- Turnout: 36.13%

General elections were held in Jordan on 20 September 2016 to elect the 18th House of Representatives. The elections were announced after parliament was dissolved by King Abdullah II on 29 May 2016, with the King appointing Hani Mulki as interim Prime Minister following the resignation of Abdullah Ensour.

Following electoral reforms announced in 2015, the elections were the first since 1989 to be held primarily under a form of proportional representation; intervening elections had been held under the single non-transferable vote system, which systematically disadvantaged Islamist political parties, and had been introduced after they won 22 of the 80 seats in the 1989 elections. The reforms led to opposition parties deciding to contest the elections, including the Islamic Action Front (IAF), the political arm of the Muslim Brotherhood, which had boycotted several previous elections, including in 2010 and 2013. Splits in the Muslim Brotherhood before the elections led to the defection of hundreds of Muslim Brotherhood figures to form a new, supposedly more moderate party.

The IAF contested the elections as part of the National Coalition for Reform (NCR) alliance, which included Christians, Circassians and women. Despite being expected to win 20–30 seats, the alliance won only 15 seats, of which 10 were IAF members. The secular Ma'an list won two seats in Amman's third district, gaining parliamentary representation for the first time. Women made historic gains, with 20 of 130 elected members being female, an increase from 18 of the 150 seats available in the 2013 elections. Voter turnout was reported to be 37%, lower than previous elections and attributed to the inability of Jordanian expatriates (around one million) to vote due to the new electoral law. The elections were regarded as fair and transparent by international observers, though Jordanian elections are often marred by significant deficiencies, such as a bias towards candidates loyal to the monarchy and other elites.

== Timetable ==
Date	Event
29 May 2016	Dissolution of parliament
9 June 2016	Royal Decree calling for elections
9 June 2016	Elections date designated
23 June 2016	Preliminary voter lists issued
8 July 2016	Last day for voter lists objections and appeals
15 August 2016	Final voter list issued
16 August 2016	Start of candidacy phase
18 August 2016	Preliminary candidate lists issued
4 September 2016	Last day for voters’ objections or appeals to candidates or lists
10 September 2016	Last day for candidates withdrawal
20 September 2016	Elections day
22 September 2016	Final results issued

== Electoral system ==
The Parliament of Jordan consists of two chambers, an upper Senate appointed by the King, and a lower Chamber of Deputies elected through popular vote. These share equal legislative responsibility. The King appoints the Prime Minister and Cabinet from the lower house, and also hold wide legislative and executive powers. After parliament is dissolved, the constitution mandates elections be held within four months, although the King may delay elections or suspend parliament and rule by decree. The government can be dismissed by a two-thirds vote of no confidence by the Chamber of Deputies.

The age of suffrage is 18. Those who are bankrupt or mentally disabled are not allowed to vote, and there have historically been no provisions to help absentee or special needs voters. Employees of the armed forces, state security services, public security services, Gendarmie, and Civil Defence forces cannot vote during their employment, and the right to vote is voided for some convicts.

Parliament has quotas for women, as well as for some ethnic and religious minorities. Women have 15 reserved seats, Christians have nine seats, and Circassians and Chechens share three. Bedouin tribes have their own electoral districts, and elect nine members of parliament, three of which overlap with the women's quota. While political parties do exist, they have historically been repressed, and for many decades the political system has been designed to weaken them. Political parties come under the jurisdiction of the Ministry of Interior, and may not be established on the basis of religion. They have low membership, with tribes playing roles traditionally associated with political parties. Elections are therefore often based on patronage. Politics mirrors the demographic split between those of Palestinian origin and those of East Bank origin. The state is dominated by East Bankers and they form the core of monarchical support, whereas Jordanian Palestinians had little political representation and were systematically discriminated against. Gerrymandered constituencies have meant elections often focus on local affairs rather than national ones.

=== Electoral reforms ===
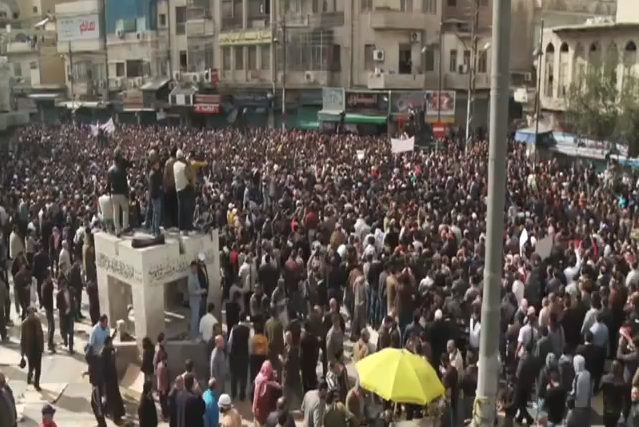
Economic protesters in Amman in 2012

Political parties were long suppressed in Jordan under martial law. An economic crash and resultant unrest led to political liberalisation in 1989. The 1989 elections were run using block voting, a system left over from the era of British rule. Political parties were banned, but independents were often affiliated with underground parties, and the results gave a majority to parties opposing the monarchy's political direction. Due to the 1989 election results, King Hussein changed the political system for the 1993 elections in order to suppress Islamist votes. The new system, which became known as “one-man one-vote”, disproportionately benefitted rural East Bank communities over urban and Palestinian communities. While political parties were legalised, the new system weakened them. This system was unpopular with many political parties, and subsequent elections held under this system faced boycotts by numerous groups, notably the Islamic Action Front.

Political grievances emerged alongside other causes of unrest during the 2011–12 Jordanian protests that occurred as part of the wider Arab Spring. King Abdullah moved to assuage the populace, promising reform and firing governments in quick succession, meaning that in the two years after the unrest began there were five Prime Ministers. Reform bodies were set up, and some substantial changes were made including the introduction of an Independent Election Committee (IEC), and the introduction of a mixed electoral system whereby 27 of the 150 elected seats would be determined through nationwide proportional representation. Most changes however were cosmetic at best, and political parties including the IAF boycotted the 2013 election.

In 2015 the government announced new reforms, promising an end to the one-man one-vote system. The proposed reforms were revealed on 31 August 2015. The new electoral system was very similar to the 1989 elections, in that it fully did away with one-man one-vote, reintroducing block voting for all seats. One major difference was that in addition to voting for individual candidates, voters will also have a single vote for a multi-member party list, an adaptation taken from the experiment with proportional representation in the 2013 elections. All candidates will run as members of lists, with open list PR used to determine all seats falling outside of quotas. For the Circassian/Chechen and Christian seats, the seat is given to the highest candidate from within those groups. The female quota seats however are assigned to women who would not otherwise be elected. Re-elections will be held in the case of ties. After minor changes in both houses, the new law was approved by the King on 13 March 2016. Parliament was dissolved on 29 May and the government of Abdullah Ensour resigned, with the King appointing Hani Al-Mulki as caretaker Prime Minister in the lead-up to the election. The IEC set 20 September 2016 as the date of the election shortly afterwards.

=== Electoral districts ===
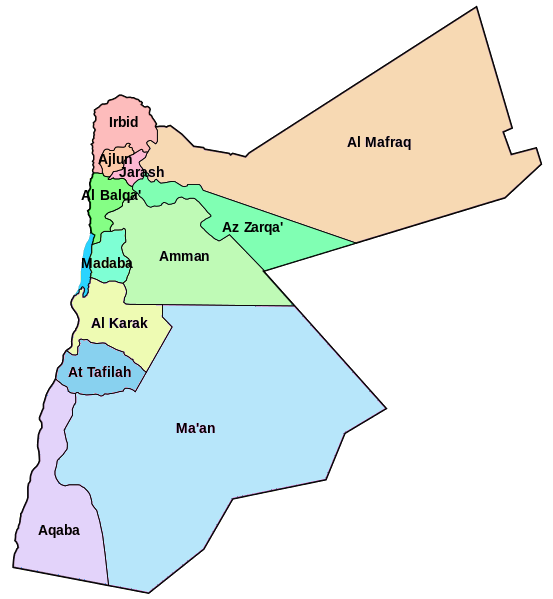
Aside from the Bedouin badia districts, the districts for the 2016 election cover either one governorate or part of a governorate.

There are 23 electoral districts; five in the Amman governorate, four in the Irbid governorate, two in the Zarqa governorate, one each for the other nine governorates, and three badia districts for Bedouins. The Circassian/Chechen and Christian quotas were included among seats assigned within the governorate districts. Of the nine seats for the Christian quota, two are in both the Balqa district and the Karak district, and there is one in each of the following: Irbid's 3rd district, the Ajloun district, Zarqa's 1st district, Amman's 3rd district, and the Madaba district. The three Circassian/Chechen seats are in Zarqa's 1st district, Amman's 3rd district, and Amman's 4th district. The female quota is divided so that there is one seat in each governorate, and one in each badia. While the division of population between districts remains imperfect, it was an improvement upon previous elections.

Distribution of seats
District	General	Circassians/ Chechens	Christians	Women	Total
Ajloun	3		1	1	5
Amman 1	5				5
Amman 2	6				6
Amman 3	4	1	1	1	7
Amman 4	4				4
Amman 5	6	1			7
Aqaba	3			1	4
Balqa	8		2	1	11
Irbid 1	6				6
Irbid 2	4			1	5
Irbid 3	3		1		4
Irbid 4	5				5
Jerash	4			1	5
Karak	8		2	1	11
Ma'an	4			1	5
Madaba	3		1	1	5
Mafraq	4			1	5
Tafilah	4			1	5
Zarqa 1	6	1	1	1	9
Zarqa 2	4				4
Bedouins of the North	3			1	4
Bedouins of the Center	3			1	4
Bedouins of the South	3			1	4
Total	103	3	9	15	130

=== Administration ===
Like with the 2013 election, the 2016 election will be run by the IEC. The IEC has stated one of its aims for the 2016 election is the restoration of public faith in the electoral system. Candidates were required to register by 16 August. Campaign spending is capped by the IEC to 5 dinars per voter in a district for large urban districts.

This is the first election where special centres are to be provided for deaf and blind voters. Voter registration was automatic, carried out using lists provided to the IEC by the Civil Service and the Passport Division. Indelible ink will be compulsory for voters.

== Campaign ==
The reforms led to fears that Palestinians and Islamists would increase their influence. In 2015 internal divisions emerged among the Muslim Brotherhood, with splinter groups encouraged by the government. One splinter group, known as the Muslim Brotherhood Association, registered itself as the official Muslim Brotherhood in Jordan, taking advantage of the fact that the Muslim Brotherhood was affiliated with its Egyptian founders rather than being registered as a Jordanian organisation. The Muslim Brotherhood Association, which emphasises its Jordanian identity, was given official status in March 2015. Subsequent internal dissent among the original Muslim Brotherhood led to the resignation of hundreds of members. Two other splinter groups have also broken away from the Muslim Brotherhood. The Muslim Brotherhood Association leveraged its official status to launch lawsuits claiming ownership of Muslim Brotherhood property, and in April 2016 the lawsuits were decided in the favour of the Association, leading them to seizing control of a wide swathe of Muslim Brotherhood property. The government also prevented a celebration of the 70th anniversary of the founding of the Muslim Brotherhood.

Despite the original Muslim Brotherhood becoming illegal after the official recognition of their splinter group, the IAF remained legal as it was registered as a Jordanian organisation. After the announcement of election reform in 2015, the IAF reported that they found the changes to be positive reforms, especially the removal of one-man one-vote. Despite its internal splits, the IAF held an internal vote on whether to compete in the 2016 elections, and it reported 76% of its members supported participation, whereas 17% opposed participation without substantial limitations to the King's constitutional powers. The government wanted the IAF to compete in order to enhance the election's legitimacy in western eyes. This along with the fear of obscurity may have contributed to the IAF vote result, and it is thought that they may be attempting to emulate the gains of elected Islamist parties in Tunisia and Morocco who co-operated with their governments, while avoiding suppression similar to that occurring in Egypt.

After the vote, the IAF announced that it was ending its boycott and would compete, and that it was reaching out to other opposition parties to discuss campaigning. On 20 August it announced it would be running on 20 national lists in various electoral districts, all under the banner of the “National Coalition for Reform”. These lists are shared with representatives from other political parties and some tribes, including five Christians contesting the Christian seats, four candidates for the Circassian and Chechen seats, and 19 women.

Two Muslim Brotherhood-linked candidates, Hossam Messheh and Ali Abussokar, were disqualified from the elections for the offence of showing mourning for the death of the international terrorist, Abu Musab Al-Zarkawi. Ali Abusokkar was a member of the parliament in 2006 when he was expelled for visiting the mourning house of Al-Khalayleh tribe, the tribe that Al-Zarkawi hails from.

On 10 September, the deadline for withdrawal from the parliamentary race, the final number of candidates reached 1,252 in 226 lists. 18 candidates had withdrawn from the race, while 21 applications were rejected. The Jordan News Agency reported that "1,252 candidates comprised 920 Muslim males, 245 Muslim females, 58 Christian males, five Christian females, 22 Circassian and Chechen males and two Circassian and Chechen females."

== Conduct ==
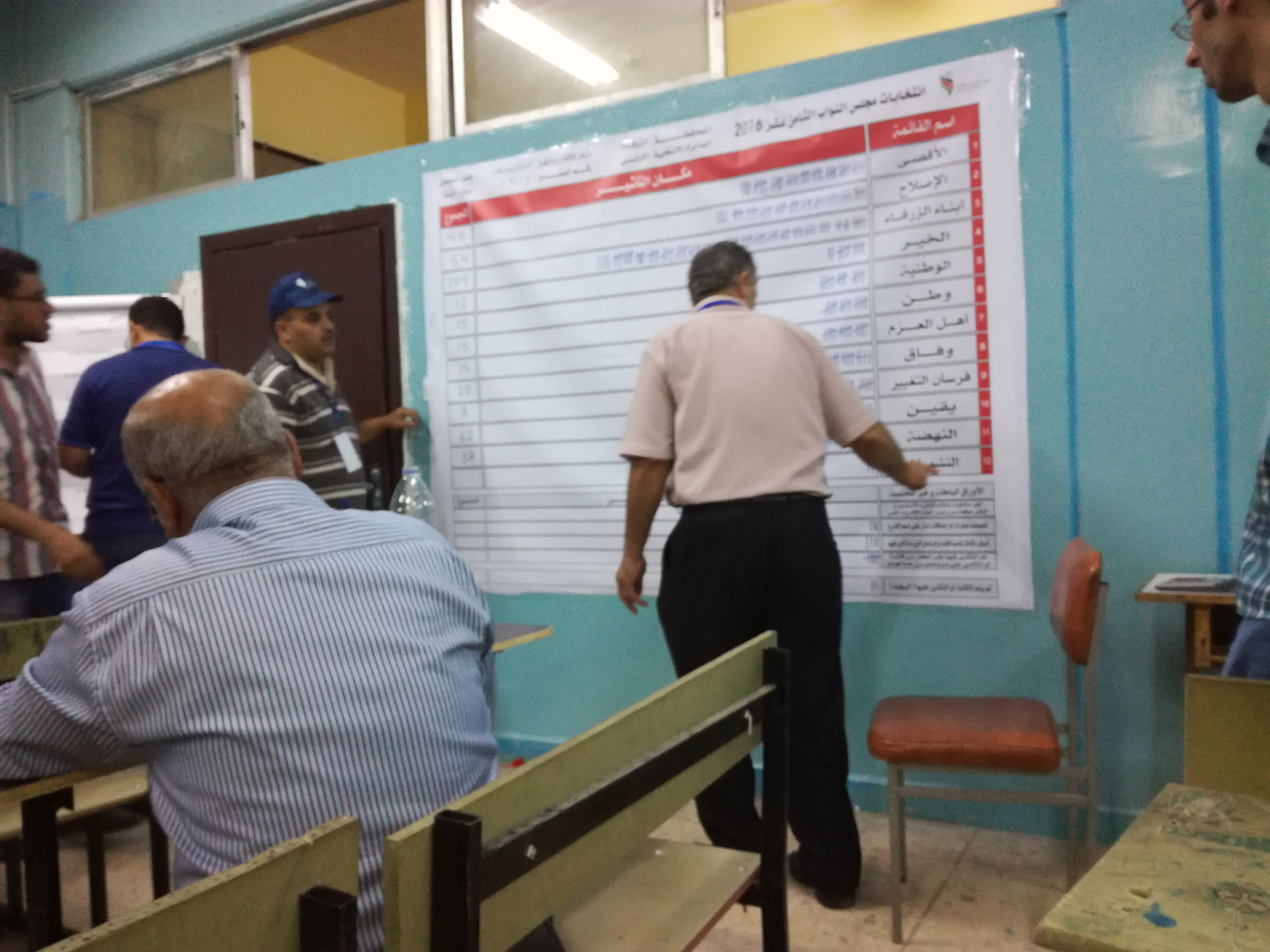
The screening process at a school the city of Zarqa

The Independent Electoral Commission sent invites to a number of Arab and foreign organizations to observe the election process. The European Union will take part in the observation of the election process through a task force that has access to all poll related facilities, including police stations. IEC declared that this is a step to ensure fair and transparent elections.

International observers stated that the elections were organized "with integrity and in full transparency". Few violations were reported, and the committees presented recommendations for upcoming elections.

== Results ==
Around 1.5 million Jordanians went to the polls on 20 September, a 37% voter turnout. Number of eligible voters numbered around 4.1 million, up from 2.3 million in 2013. Voter turnout is lower than the previous elections due to the new elections law, where Jordanian expatriates, numbered at 1 million, were not granted the ability to vote.

Five women managed to win outside the quota system, making the total of female parliamentarians 20 out of 130, a record for Jordan. The last elections held 18 women out of 150.

The elections witnessed the first emergence of a secular movement, the Ma'an list, which strongly advocated for a civil state. It received the most votes in Amman's third district. Two candidates from Ma'an were elected, alongside three Islamists, as they had won in the women and Circassian quotas of Amman's third district.

Party	Votes	%	Seats
Reform	86,523	5.96	13
Justice (Al-'adāla)	67,399	4.64	7
Dignity	53,568	3.69	2
Homeland	48,032	3.31	6
Olive	46,475	3.20	4
Fulfillment	45,456	3.13	6
The Union	38,234	2.63	3
Right	30,727	2.12	2
Renewal	29,834	2.05	2
Balance	29,586	2.04	2
The Brave Ones	26,578	1.83	2
Blessing	25,749	1.77	2
Accord	23,529	1.62	2
Cooperation	23,148	1.59	2
Jerusalem Al-Sharif	20,148	1.39	1
National Unity	19,920	1.37	2
Sons of Karak	19,002	1.31	3
The Job	17,892	1.23	3
Al-Aqsa	17,830	1.23	2
Irbid	16,985	1.17	1
To Construct	16,324	1.12	0
The People	16,284	1.12	1
Originality	15,394	1.06	2
Certainty	14,971	1.03	1
Hauran of Goodness	14,762	1.02	2
The Covenant	14,679	1.01	1
Nation	14,553	1.00	2
Renaissance	13,368	0.92	0
Sons of Zarqa	13,049	0.90	1
Change	12,560	0.86	0
Packages	12,366	0.85	1
The Farthest	12,329	0.85	1
Union and Work	12,200	0.84	1
Thunder of the North	11,697	0.81	2
Al-Raya	11,595	0.80	1
Participation and Change	11,437	0.79	1
The Earth	11,122	0.77	1
Ma'an List	10,973	0.76	2
The Lion	10,815	0.74	1
Loyalty to the Homeland	10,473	0.72	1
Daybreak	10,406	0.72	1
The Good	10,203	0.70	1
Knights of Jerusalem	10,121	0.70	1
National Democratic	10,046	0.69	1
Mount Ajloun	9,938	0.68	1
Falcons	9,858	0.68	2
Sons of Balqa	9,807	0.68	1
The Poor	9,548	0.66	1
Say and Do	9,067	0.62	1
National	8,992	0.62	0
Mafraq for All	8,907	0.61	1
Loyalty to the Jordan Valley	8,702	0.60	1
The Sun	8,539	0.59	1
Palm Tree	8,527	0.59	1
Monastery of Al	8,495	0.58	0
People of Determination	8,392	0.58	1
Motherland	8,327	0.57	2
Irbid Dignity	8,326	0.57	1
The Flag	8,176	0.56	1
Lion-Prepared	8,171	0.56	1
Bright Future	7,624	0.52	1
Al-Kinana	7,590	0.52	1
Strap	7,463	0.51	1
Gold Thread	7,438	0.51	0
Popular	7,395	0.51	0
Success	7,073	0.49	0
The Two Banks	6,965	0.48	1
Al-Yarmuk	6,853	0.47	0
The Truth Prevails	6,837	0.47	1
Arabism	6,807	0.47	1
Future 8	6,785	0.47	0
The Ear of Corn	6,682	0.46	0
The Black	6,617	0.46	0
And Hold On	6,602	0.45	0
Free Falcons	6,590	0.45	1
Aqaba	6,316	0.43	2
National Alliance	6,269	0.43	0
Tafilah Mountains	5,916	0.41	1
Peace	5,895	0.41	0
The Future of Madaba	5,848	0.40	1
Black	5,840	0.40	0
The Storm	5,814	0.40	0
Petra	5,763	0.40	2
Unity and Development	5,740	0.40	0
Jordan Unites Us	5,684	0.39	0
Completion	5,658	0.39	1
The Full Moon	5,566	0.38	1
Eye of the Homeland	5,554	0.38	1
The Future. Amman	5,526	0.38	1
The Promise	5,501	0.38	0
Reform and Development	5,497	0.38	0
The Light	5,192	0.36	0
Future - Zarqa	4,925	0.34	1
Zamzam	4,865	0.33	0
Reform 2	4,651	0.32	0
The Pen	4,539	0.31	0
Together we Can	4,529	0.31	0
Black Lily	4,436	0.31	0
Amman	4,200	0.29	0
Jerusalem	4,176	0.29	0
Sons of the South	4,175	0.29	0
Success from Allah	4,147	0.29	0
The Knight	4,090	0.28	1
Construction and Renovation	3,994	0.27	0
Tiller	3,902	0.27	0
The Future	3,798	0.26	0
The Desert	3,694	0.25	0
Al-Shobak	3,685	0.25	1
Spike	3,444	0.24	0
The Lighthouse	3,420	0.24	1
Youth of the Homeland	3,404	0.23	0
Knights	3,364	0.23	0
People of Ambition	3,349	0.23	0
Loyalty to the Desert	3,166	0.22	0
Solidarity	2,460	0.17	0
Al-Ribat	2,375	0.16	0
Fulfillment of the Covenant	2,374	0.16	0
The Future is for Tafilah	2,186	0.15	0
Chivalry	2,070	0.14	0
The Voice of the True	1,983	0.14	0
Madaba	1,982	0.14	0
Consensus	1,920	0.13	0
Trust in Allah	1,549	0.11	0
Unified Sarhan	1,478	0.10	0
Love for the Sake of Allah	1,470	0.10	0
Generosity	1,184	0.08	0
Our Flag	1,107	0.08	0
United Front	1,078	0.07	0
Knights of Change	998	0.07	0
Jerash	989	0.07	0
The Brave Women	807	0.06	0
Initiative	762	0.05	0
Homeland Path	722	0.05	0
The Supporters	477	0.03	0
Justice (Al-'adl)	464	0.03	0
Yes	353	0.02	0
Giving	211	0.01	0
The New Dawn	159	0.01	0
Jordanian Women	141	0.01	0
Yalu	105	0.01	0
The Legend	76	0.01	0
Jordanian Youth	39	0.00	0
Total	1,452,486	100.00	130
Valid votes	1,452,486	97.33	
Invalid/blank votes	39,914	2.67	
Total votes	1,492,400	100.00	
Registered voters/turnout	4,130,145	36.13	

=== By district ===
Results by district
District	Registered	List	Votes	Seats			
District	Registered	List	Votes	General	Circassian/ Chechen	Christian	Women
Ajloun	101,112	The Job	14,213	1			1
Ajloun	101,112	Accord	11,599	1		1	
Ajloun	101,112	Mount Ajloun	9,938	1			
Ajloun	101,112	The Union	9,192				
Ajloun	101,112	Gold Thread	7,438				
Ajloun	101,112	Daybreak	4,648				
Ajloun	101,112	Invalid votes	2,305				
Amman 1	290,177	Participation and Change	11,437	1			
Amman 1	290,177	Say and Do	9,067	1			
Amman 1	290,177	The People	7,282	1			
Amman 1	290,177	The Good	7,019	1			
Amman 1	290,177	Reform	6,647	1			
Amman 1	290,177	Justice (Al-'adāla)	6,323				
Amman 1	290,177	Unity and Development	5,740				
Amman 1	290,177	Together we Can	4,529				
Amman 1	290,177	Solidarity	2,460				
Amman 1	290,177	Al-Ribat	2,375				
Amman 1	290,177	Renewal	1,357				
Amman 1	290,177	Renaissance	469				
Amman 1	290,177	The New Dawn	159				
Amman 1	290,177	Yalu	105				
Amman 1	290,177	Invalid votes	1,280				
Amman 2	400,452	Cooperation	12,535	1			
Amman 2	400,452	Knights of Jerusalem	10,121	1			
Amman 2	400,452	Reform	10,096	1			
Amman 2	400,452	Palm Tree	8,527	1			
Amman 2	400,452	Arabism	6,807	1			
Amman 2	400,452	Free Falcons	6,590	1			
Amman 2	400,452	To Construct	6,055				
Amman 2	400,452	Jordan Unites Us	5,684				
Amman 2	400,452	Balance	5,259				
Amman 2	400,452	Change	4,914				
Amman 2	400,452	Black Lily	4,436				
Amman 2	400,452	The Legend	76				
Amman 2	400,452	Invalid votes	1,786				
Amman 3	242,198	Ma'an List	10,973	1		1	
Amman 3	242,198	Reform	9,172	1	1		1
Amman 3	242,198	Completion	5,658	1			
Amman 3	242,198	The Future. Amman	5,526	1			
Amman 3	242,198	Amman	4,200				
Amman 3	242,198	Jerusalem	4,176				
Amman 3	242,198	The Light	2,319				
Amman 3	242,198	The Voice of the True	1,983				
Amman 3	242,198	United Front	1,078				
Amman 3	242,198	Yes	353				
Amman 3	242,198	Invalid votes	1,069				
Amman 4	249,125	Jerusalem Al-Sharif	20,148	1			
Amman 4	249,125	Justice (Al-'adāla)	12,335	1			
Amman 4	249,125	Reform	9,155	1			
Amman 4	249,125	The Two Banks	6,965	1			
Amman 4	249,125	The Promise	5,501				
Amman 4	249,125	Renewal	4,186				
Amman 4	249,125	Blessing	3,524				
Amman 4	249,125	Renaissance	3,456				
Amman 4	249,125	Knights	3,364				
Amman 4	249,125	The Covenant	2,894				
Amman 4	249,125	Al-Raya	1,471				
Amman 4	249,125	Invalid votes	1,263				
Amman 5	375,433	Packages	12,366	1			
Amman 5	375,433	Union and Work	12,200	1			
Amman 5	375,433	Fulfillment	11,850	1			
Amman 5	375,433	Reform	11,402	1	1		
Amman 5	375,433	The Brave Ones	10,528	1			
Amman 5	375,433	Al-Raya	10,124	1			
Amman 5	375,433	National Alliance	6,269				
Amman 5	375,433	Right	5,451				
Amman 5	375,433	Renewal	4,826				
Amman 5	375,433	Spike	3,444				
Amman 5	375,433	Homeland Path	722				
Amman 5	375,433	The People	642				
Amman 5	375,433	Jordanian Women	141				
Amman 5	375,433	Invalid votes	2,547				
Aqaba	55,819	Aqaba	6,316	1			1
Aqaba	55,819	Daybreak	3,797	1			
Aqaba	55,819	The Lighthouse	3,420	1			
Aqaba	55,819	Renaissance	2,651				
Aqaba	55,819	Reform	2,056				
Aqaba	55,819	Consensus	1,920				
Aqaba	55,819	National Unity	1,714				
Aqaba	55,819	Loyalty to the Homeland	1,519				
Aqaba	55,819	Invalid votes	424				
Balqa	297,818	Justice (Al-'adāla)	17,084	1		1	
Balqa	297,818	Nation	14,553	1		1	
Balqa	297,818	Renewal	13,492	1			1
Balqa	297,818	Dignity	13,481	1			
Balqa	297,818	Reform	11,257	1			
Balqa	297,818	Sons of Balqa	9,807	1			
Balqa	297,818	The Union	9,137	1			
Balqa	297,818	Right	8,654	1			
Balqa	297,818	Monastery of Al	8,495				
Balqa	297,818	The People	6,939				
Balqa	297,818	And Hold On	6,602				
Balqa	297,818	Daybreak	1,961				
Balqa	297,818	Jordanian Youth	39				
Balqa	297,818	Invalid votes	3,113				
Irbid 1	325,918	Irbid	16,985	1			
Irbid 1	325,918	Balance	13,309	1			
Irbid 1	325,918	Justice (Al-'adāla)	12,437	1			
Irbid 1	325,918	The Farthest	12,329	1			
Irbid 1	325,918	Olive	9,583	1			
Irbid 1	325,918	Irbid Dignity	8,326	1			
Irbid 1	325,918	To Construct	8,216				
Irbid 1	325,918	The Union	7,629				
Irbid 1	325,918	The Ear of Corn	6,682				
Irbid 1	325,918	The Covenant	6,537				
Irbid 1	325,918	Zamzam	4,865				
Irbid 1	325,918	Youth of the Homeland	3,404				
Irbid 1	325,918	Invalid votes	3,294				
Irbid 2	144,883	Hauran of Goodness	14,762	1			1
Irbid 2	144,883	Justice (Al-'adāla)	12,590	1			
Irbid 2	144,883	The Poor	9,548	1			
Irbid 2	144,883	Al-Kinana	7,590	1			
Irbid 2	144,883	Popular	7,395				
Irbid 2	144,883	Al-Yarmuk	6,853				
Irbid 2	144,883	Blessing	5,974				
Irbid 2	144,883	Dignity	4,123				
Irbid 2	144,883	Olive	3,834				
Irbid 2	144,883	Invalid votes	2,418				
Irbid 3	114,052	The Union	12,276	1		1	
Irbid 3	114,052	National Democratic	10,046	1			
Irbid 3	114,052	Fulfillment	7,291	1			
Irbid 3	114,052	Peace	5,895				
Irbid 3	114,052	National Unity	4,438				
Irbid 3	114,052	Construction and Renovation	3,994				
Irbid 3	114,052	People of Ambition	3,349				
Irbid 3	114,052	The Supporters	477				
Irbid 3	114,052	Invalid votes	2,032				
Irbid 4	163,899	The Brave Ones	15,253	1			
Irbid 4	163,899	Fulfillment	14,479	1			
Irbid 4	163,899	Olive	10,835	1			
Irbid 4	163,899	The Lion	10,815	1			
Irbid 4	163,899	Cooperation	8,996	1			
Irbid 4	163,899	Dignity	7,737				
Irbid 4	163,899	Future 8	6,785				
Irbid 4	163,899	Reform	3,241				
Irbid 4	163,899	Invalid votes	2,656				
Jerash	107,637	The Earth	11,122	1			
Jerash	107,637	Reform	8,979	1			
Jerash	107,637	Originality	8,974	1			1
Jerash	107,637	Blessing	7,630	1			
Jerash	107,637	National	6,173				
Jerash	107,637	Renewal	5,973				
Jerash	107,637	Black	5,840				
Jerash	107,637	Olive	5,179				
Jerash	107,637	Jerash	989				
Jerash	107,637	Invalid votes	1,544				
Karak	167,280	Homeland	19,722	2		1	1
Karak	167,280	Sons of Karak	19,002	2		1	
Karak	167,280	Right	15,214	1			
Karak	167,280	Olive	10,299	1			
Karak	167,280	Loyalty to the Jordan Valley	8,702	1			
Karak	167,280	The Sun	8,539	1			
Karak	167,280	Success	7,073				
Karak	167,280	Change	5,816				
Karak	167,280	The Pen	4,539				
Karak	167,280	Chivalry	2,070				
Karak	167,280	Invalid votes	2,475				
Ma'an	53,217	The Truth Prevails	6,837	1			
Ma'an	53,217	Petra	5,763	1			1
Ma'an	53,217	Al-Shobak	3,685	1			
Ma'an	53,217	The Job	3,679	1			
Ma'an	53,217	Dignity	2,674				
Ma'an	53,217	Cooperation	1,617				
Ma'an	53,217	Trust in Allah	1,549				
Ma'an	53,217	Justice (Al-'adāla)	1,136				
Ma'an	53,217	Invalid votes	828				
Madaba	106,370	Motherland	8,327	1		1	
Madaba	106,370	National Unity	8,082	1			
Madaba	106,370	The Future of Madaba	5,848	1			
Madaba	106,370	Reform and Development	5,497				
Madaba	106,370	The Covenant	5,248				1
Madaba	106,370	Dignity	5,220				
Madaba	106,370	Success from Allah	4,147				
Madaba	106,370	The Light	2,873				
Madaba	106,370	Madaba	1,982				
Madaba	106,370	The People	1,421				
Madaba	106,370	Invalid votes	1,610				
Mafraq	95,055	Falcons	9,858	1			1
Mafraq	95,055	Mafraq for All	8,907	1			
Mafraq	95,055	Homeland	7,560	1			
Mafraq	95,055	Strap	7,463	1			
Mafraq	95,055	The Black	6,617				
Mafraq	95,055	Accord	4,738				
Mafraq	95,055	Blessing	3,741				
Mafraq	95,055	Invalid votes	1,507				
Tafilah	54,638	Olive	6,745	1			
Tafilah	54,638	Tafilah Mountains	5,916	1			
Tafilah	54,638	Justice (Al-'adāla)	5,147	1			1
Tafilah	54,638	The Knight	4,090	1			
Tafilah	54,638	Tiller	3,902				
Tafilah	54,638	Fulfillment of the Covenant	2,374				
Tafilah	54,638	The Future is for Tafilah	2,186				
Tafilah	54,638	Initiative	762				
Tafilah	54,638	Giving	211				
Tafilah	54,638	Invalid votes	1,241				
Zarqa 1	449,753	Al-Aqsa	17,830	1		1	
Zarqa 1	449,753	Certainty	14,971	1			
Zarqa 1	449,753	Reform	14,518	1	1		1
Zarqa 1	449,753	Homeland	14,183	1			
Zarqa 1	449,753	Sons of Zarqa	13,049	1			
Zarqa 1	449,753	People of Determination	7,626	1			
Zarqa 1	449,753	Renaissance	6,792				
Zarqa 1	449,753	Accord	3,947				
Zarqa 1	449,753	The Good	3,184				
Zarqa 1	449,753	National	2,819				
Zarqa 1	449,753	Knights of Change	998				
Zarqa 1	449,753	The Brave Women	807				
Zarqa 1	449,753	Invalid votes	2,220				
Zarqa 2	131,254	Loyalty to the Homeland	8,954	1			
Zarqa 2	131,254	National Unity	5,686	1			
Zarqa 2	131,254	Eye of the Homeland	5,554	1			
Zarqa 2	131,254	Future - Zarqa	4,925	1			
Zarqa 2	131,254	Dignity	4,907				
Zarqa 2	131,254	Reform 2	4,651				
Zarqa 2	131,254	Accord	3,245				
Zarqa 2	131,254	To Construct	2,053				
Zarqa 2	131,254	Right	1,408				
Zarqa 2	131,254	Invalid votes	1,375				
Bedouins of the North	83,914	Thunder of the North	11,697	1			1
Bedouins of the North	83,914	Balance	11,018	1			
Bedouins of the North	83,914	Lion-Prepared	8,171	1			
Bedouins of the North	83,914	Dignity	7,134				
Bedouins of the North	83,914	Homeland	6,567				
Bedouins of the North	83,914	Loyalty to the Desert	3,166				
Bedouins of the North	83,914	Unified Sarhan	1,478				
Bedouins of the North	83,914	People of Determination	766				
Bedouins of the North	83,914	Invalid votes	1,026				
Bedouins of the Middle	56,102	The Full Moon	5,566	1			
Bedouins of the Middle	56,102	Fulfillment	5,044	1			
Bedouins of the Middle	56,102	Blessing	4,880	1			
Bedouins of the Middle	56,102	Dignity	4,204				1
Bedouins of the Middle	56,102	The Future	3,798				
Bedouins of the Middle	56,102	The Desert	3,694				
Bedouins of the Middle	56,102	Change	1,830				
Bedouins of the Middle	56,102	Love for the Sake of Allah	1,470				
Bedouins of the Middle	56,102	Generosity	1,184				
Bedouins of the Middle	56,102	Our Flag	1,107				
Bedouins of the Middle	56,102	The Brave Ones	797				
Bedouins of the Middle	56,102	Justice (Al-'adl)	464				
Bedouins of the Middle	56,102	Invalid votes	1,549				
Bedouins of the South	64,039	The Flag	8,176	1			
Bedouins of the South	64,039	Bright Future	7,624	1			
Bedouins of the South	64,039	Fulfillment	6,792	1			1
Bedouins of the South	64,039	Originality	6,420				
Bedouins of the South	64,039	The Storm	5,814				
Bedouins of the South	64,039	Sons of the South	4,175				
Bedouins of the South	64,039	Dignity	4,088				
Bedouins of the South	64,039	Justice (Al-'adāla)	347				
Bedouins of the South	64,039	Invalid votes	352				

== Aftermath ==
The reforms introduced in the 2016 general elections, led Freedom House to designate Jordan as "partly free" from the previous "not free" in its Freedom in the World 2017 report. The report added that the change was "due to electoral law changes that led to somewhat fairer parliamentary elections."
