= Fureidis =

Fureidis: פֻרֵידִיס; فريديس
- Local council

Hebrew transcription(s)
  - ISO 259: P̄ureidis
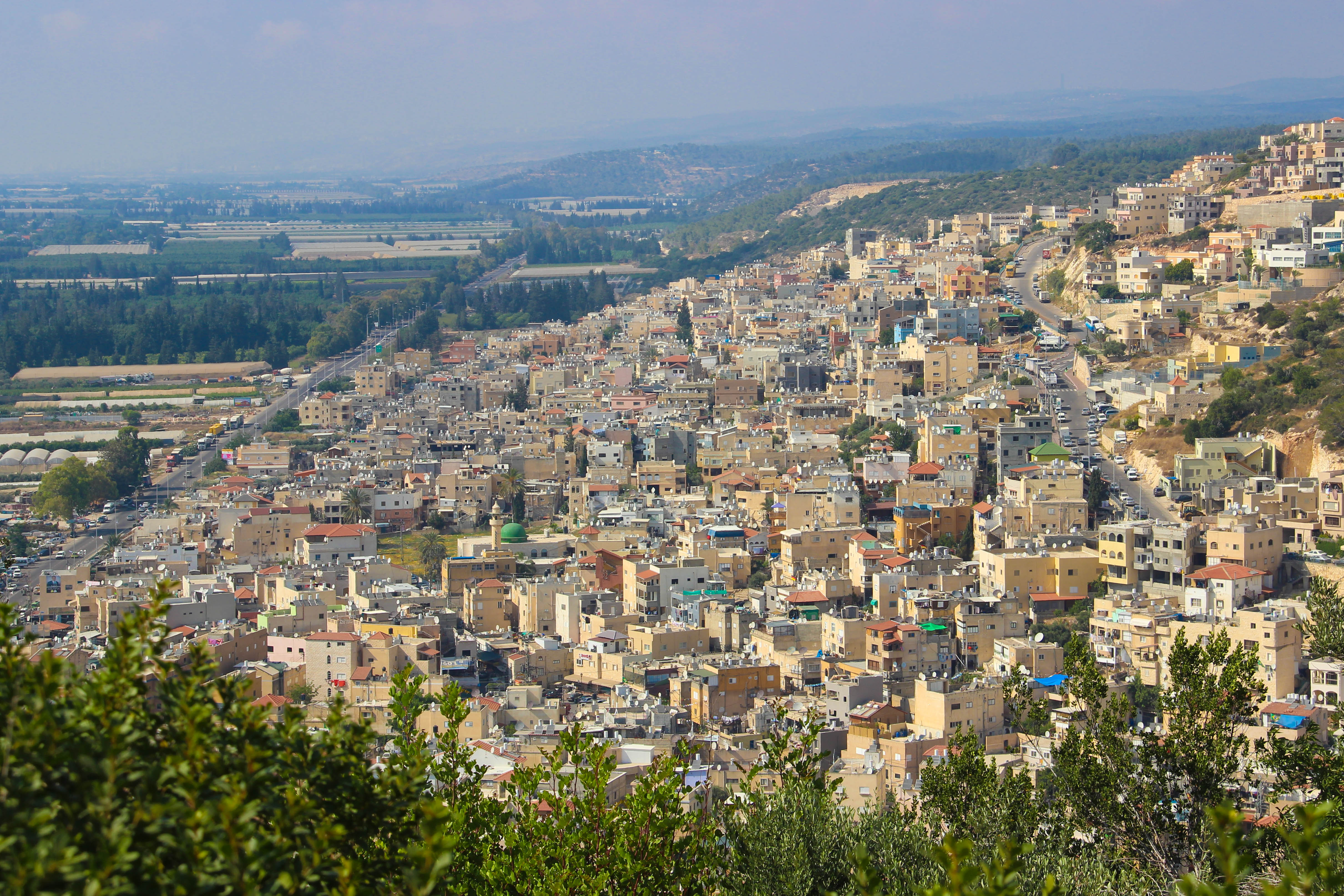
- Fureidis

- Location within Haifa region of Israel Location within Israel
- Coordinates: 32°35′48″N 34°57′02″E
- Grid position: 145/222 PAL
- Country: Israel
- District: Haifa
- Subdistrict: Hadera
- Natural Region: Karmel Coast

Area
  - Total: 2,690 dunams (2.69 km^{2}; 1.04 sq mi)

Population (2024)
  - Total: 13,548
  - Density: 5,040/km^{2} (13,000/sq mi)
- Name meaning: "The little Paradise"

Fureidis (also Freidis; Arabic: فريديس, Hebrew: פֻרֵידִיס) is an Arab town in the Haifa District of Israel. It received local council status in 1952. In 2024 its population was 13,548.

== Name ==
The name is believed to come from the Arabic (firdawis), meaning little Garden of Eden, borrowed from the Persian word for paradise.

== History ==
A cave above the old part of Fureidis on the western slope of the Carmel was found to contain fragments of pottery from the Chalcolithic period, including large bowls, jars, ossuary fragments and a pale pink limestone pendant. It appears to have been used as a dwelling and a burial cave. The artifacts in the cave attest to the presence of a settlement from the pre-Ghassulian period. In the 19th century, three rock-hewn tombs were examined at Fureidis, each with several kokhim.

Pottery and remains from an aqueduct dating to the Roman and Byzantine periods have also been found. At the northern edge of Fureidis, pottery remains from the 13th -14th century, a coin dating to 1388–1399 CE, and building remains dated to the Mamluk period have been excavated.

=== Ottoman Empire ===
In 1517 Fureidis was incorporated into the Ottoman Empire with the rest of Palestine. During the 16th and 17th centuries, it belonged to the Turabay Emirate (1517-1683), which encompassed the Jezreel Valley, Mount Carmel, Beit She'an Valley, northern Samaria, Ramot Menashe, the northern part of the Sharon plain.

During the late Ottoman period, in 1859, the English consul Rogers estimated the population to be 200, who cultivated 18 feddans of land. In 1870, the French explorer Victor Guérin visited the village. He estimated it had one hundred and forty people, mostly shepherds and woodcutters, some who also cultivated the land.

In 1882, the PEF's Survey of Western Palestine (SWP) described the place as a village of adobe and stone at the foot of the hill, with a well to the south. A population list from about 1887 showed that Kh. Fureidis had about 300 inhabitants, all Muslim.

=== British Mandate ===
In the 1922 census of Palestine conducted by the British Mandate authorities, Al Feridis had a population of 335; all Muslims, increasing in the 1931 census to 454; still all Muslims, in a total of 98 houses.

In the 1945 statistics the population of Fureidis consisted of 780 Muslims and the land area was 4,450 dunams, according to an official land and population survey. Of this, 365 dunams were designated for plantations and irrigable land, 1,717 for cereals, while 6 dunams were built-up (urban) areas.

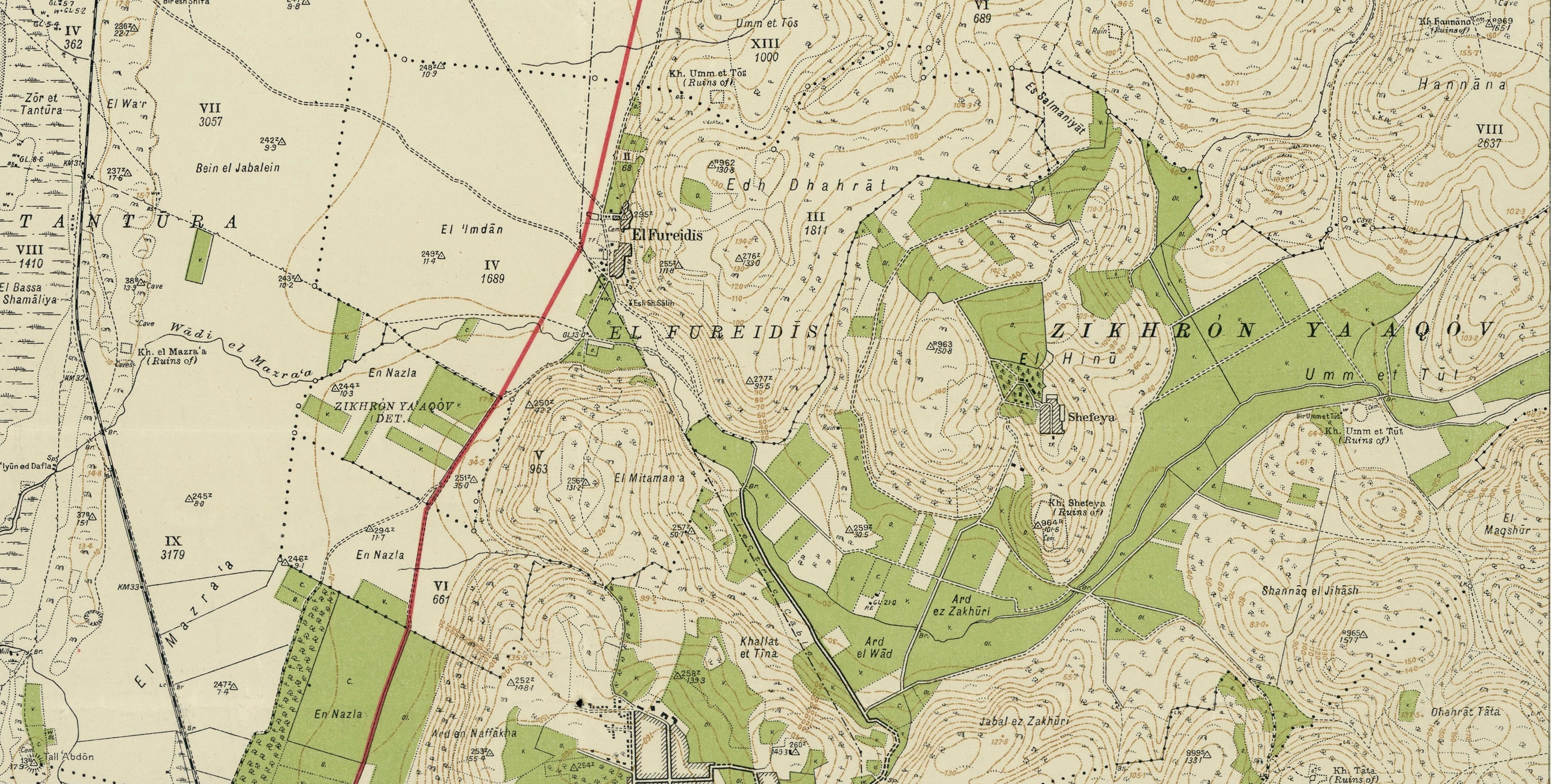
Fureidis (El Fureidis) 1938 1:20,000

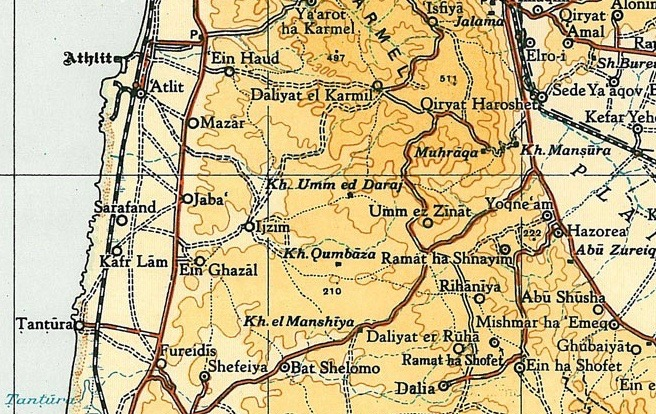
Fureidis 1945 1:250,000

=== Israel ===
Fureidis is one of the few Arab villages on Israel's coast left intact after the 1948 war. During the conflict, it received a great number of refugees from nearby villages, including Tantura, and was repeatedly considered for assault by Israeli forces. However, residents of local Jewish settlements, in particular Zichron Yaakov requested that Fureidis (and the neighbouring village of Jisr az-Zarqa) be allowed to remain, as they had traditionally had good relations with the Yishuv, and a large number of residents from Fureidis worked as hired labour on Jewish farms. This was alluded to by Arab novelist Emile Habibi in his famous novel The Secret Life of Saeed the Pessoptimist.

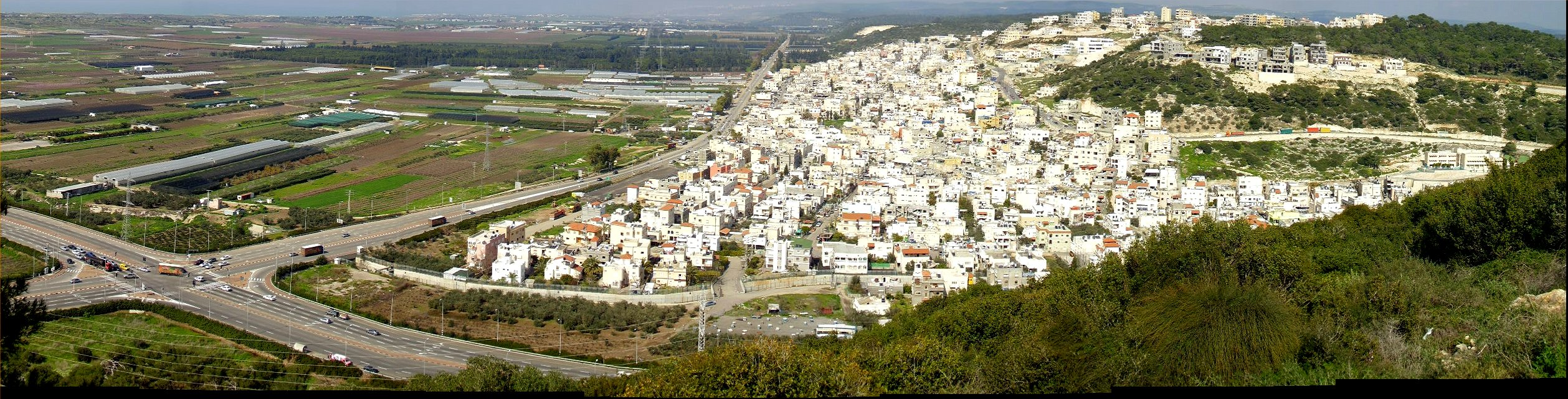
View of Fureidis

As of the census of 2008, Fureidis had 10,800 residents, of whom 99.6% were Muslim Arabs. In 2023, Fureidis had 13,356 residents.

== Education ==
According to data released by the Israeli Ministry of Education based on a 2008 census of high school matriculation scores, Fureidis had a 75.85% eligibility rate, greatly exceeding the accomplishments of most Jewish towns. The national eligibility rate in 2008-2009 was 44.4 percent of all 17-year-olds. Fureidis won third place in the national ranking. Hossni Abu Dahash, the town's high school principal, said the school had organized a marathon study program to prepare 12th graders for their matriculation exam.

== Demographics ==
Historical population
Year	Pop.	±%
1972	3,500	—
1983	5,400	+54.3%
1995	7,400	+37.0%
2008	10,800	+45.9%
2022	13,108	+21.4%
2024	13,548	+3.4%

== Folklore ==
In the center of Fureidis, there is a tomb-shrine called ash-Sheikh Ghneim, said to contain the grave of a Sufi sheikh from Benha, Egypt. His only son, Mer'i, is the ancestor of the prominent local clan bearing his name. Historically, villagers lit candles at the tomb on Fridays.

== Voting Patterns ==
In the 2022 election, 92 percent of voters in Fureidis voted for the Arab parties, while 5 percent voted for the parties of the center-left coalition led by Yair Lapid and 1 percent voted for the parties of the right-wing coalition led by Benjamin Netanyahu. Among the voters for the Arab parties, 37 percent voted for Ra'am, while 32 percent voted for Balad and 31 percent voted for the Hadash–Ta'al list.

In the 2026 election, 96 percent of voters in Fureidis voted for the Arab parties, while 2 percent voted for the parties of the center-left coalition led by Gadi Eisenkot and 0.3 percent voted for the parties of the right-wing coalition led by Benjamin Netanyahu. Among the voters for the Arab parties, 70 percent voted for the Joint List, while 30 percent voted for Ra'am. Voter turnout more than doubled compared with the 2022 election.

== Notable people ==
- Mohamed Abu Arisha (born 1997), Israeli-Arab basketball player for Hapoel Be'er Sheva of the Israeli Basketball Premier League and the Israeli national basketball team
- Ibtisam Mahameed became an activist after 1995 when she was thrown out of an Egged bus because she was an Arab. Ibtisam Mahameed was awarded the Dalai Lama's Unsung Heroes of Compassion prize.
- Ibtisam Mara'ana, Israeli-Arab politician and film director

== See also ==
- Arab localities in Israel

== Bibliography ==
- Barron, J.B., ed. (1923). Palestine: Report and General Abstracts of the Census of 1922. Government of Palestine.
- Conder, C.R.; Kitchener, H.H. (1882). The Survey of Western Palestine: Memoirs of the Topography, Orography, Hydrography, and Archaeology. Vol. 2. London: Committee of the Palestine Exploration Fund.
- Department of Statistics (1945). Village Statistics, April, 1945. Government of Palestine.
- Guérin, V. (1875). Description Géographique Historique et Archéologique de la Palestine (in French). Vol. 2: Samarie, pt. 2. Paris: L'Imprimerie Nationale.
- Hadawi, S. (1970). Village Statistics of 1945: A Classification of Land and Area ownership in Palestine. Palestine Liberation Organization Research Center.
- Mills, E., ed. (1932). Census of Palestine 1931. Population of Villages, Towns and Administrative Areas. Jerusalem: Government of Palestine.
- Morris, B. (1994). "8". 1948 and after; Israel and the Palestinians. Oxford University Press. pp. Ghosh and Beit Naqquba, Al Fureidis and Jisr Zarka. ISBN 0-19-827929-9.
- Oren, Eliran (2010-02-02). "Horbat Tafat". Hadashot Arkheologiyot – Excavations and Surveys in Israel (122).
- Palmer, E.H. (1881). The Survey of Western Palestine: Arabic and English Name Lists Collected During the Survey by Lieutenants Conder and Kitchener, R. E. Transliterated and Explained by E.H. Palmer. Committee of the Palestine Exploration Fund.
- Schumacher, G. (1888). "Population list of the Liwa of Akka". Quarterly Statement - Palestine Exploration Fund. 20: 169–191.
- Spivak, Polina (2008-05-29). "El-Fureidis Region, Survey". Hadashot Arkheologiyot – Excavations and Surveys in Israel (120).
- Torge, Hagit (2011-10-23). "Horbat Tawwasim". Hadashot Arkheologiyot – Excavations and Surveys in Israel (123).
- Yannai, Eli (2007-04-18). "El-Fureidis". Hadashot Arkheologiyot – Excavations and Surveys in Israel (119).
