= Kais Zayadin =

Jordanian politician (born 1984)

- In office 2016–2020

Kais Zayadin (born 1984) is a Jordanian politician who currently serves as a Representative in the Jordanian Parliament. He was elected in 2016 on a secular list, Ma'an list.
