= 18th Parliament of Jordan =

Sitting of the Jordanian Parliament

The 18th Parliament of Jordan was elected at the 2016 Jordanian general election. 130 members were elected and had the right to sit in the National Assembly of Jordan.

The parliament was opened on 7 November 2016 when King Abdullah II inaugurated the first regular session of the new parliament with a speech from the throne. The King dissolved the parliament on 27 September 2020.

== List of members ==
The names of the council members are in alphabetical order:

1. Ibtisam Youssef Khalil Al-Nawafleh
2. Ibrahim Hussein Al-Ali Bani Hani
3. Ibrahim Abdel-Razzaq Suleiman Abu Al-Ezz
4. Ibrahim Mahfouz Atallah Al-Badour
5. Ibrahim Mohammed Salman Abu Sayed
6. Ibrahim Musharraf Al-Radwan Al-Quran
7. Ahmed Ibrahim Salama Al-Hmisat
8. Ahmed Hassan Suleiman Al-Fraihat
9. Ahmed Salama Faleh Al-Lozy
10. Ahmed Mohammed Ali Al-Safadi
11. Intisar Badi Mustafa Hegazy
12. Andrei Murad Mahmoud Abdel-Jalil Hawari
13. Insaf Ahmed Salama Al-Khawaldeh
14. Ahmed Suleiman Awad Al-Raqab
15. Barakat Kamel Abdulkarim Al-Nimr Almhairat Al-Abadi
16. Tamer Shaher Syed Mohamed Bino
17. Jamal Issa Jeries Gammoh
18. Jawdat Ibrahim Nasir Al-Darabah
19. Habis Rakad Khalif Al Shabib
20. Habis Sami Mithqal Al-Fayez
21. Hazem Saleh Saleh Al-Majali
22. Hassan Asri Abdul Qader Al Saud
23. Hassan Mufleh Auda Allah Al-Ajarmeh
24. Hosni Mohamed Fendi Al Sheyab
25. Hussein Attia Musa Al-Qaisi
26. Hammoud Ibrahim Ahmed Al-Zawahra
27. The life of Hussein Ali Massimi
28. Khaled Ramadan Mohamed Awad
29. Khaled Zaher Al-Abed Al-Fanatah
30. Khaled Abdel-Razzaq Musa Al-Hiyari
31. Khaled Mahmoud Mohamed Al-Bakkar Al-Bishtawi
32. Khaled Musa Issa Al Abdullah Abu Hassan
33. Khalil Hussein Khalil Attia
34. Khamis Hussein Khalil Attia
35. Khair Abdullah Ayad Abu Sa'ilek
36. Dima Mohamed Tariq Tahboub
37. Rashid Mohammed Suleiman Al-Shuha
38. Raed Aqleh Mufleh Al-Khazaleh
39. Raja Jazaa Ali Al-Sarayrah
40. Rasmiya Ali Awad Al-Kaabneh
41. Ramadan Muhammad Falah Al-Hunaiti
42. Randa Abata Abdullah Al Shaar
43. Riyad Muhammad Arsan Al-Azzam
44. Reem Oqla Nawash Abu Dalbouh
45. Zaid Muhammad Falah Al Shawabkeh
46. Zainab Hammoud Salem Al-Zubaid
47. Saud Salem Ali Abu Mahfouz
48. Suleiman Huwaila Eid Al-Zaben
49. Shah Salem Salim Abu Shusha Al-Amarin
50. Shoaib Khalaf Al Muhammed Al Shdeifat
51. Saleh Sari Muhammad Abu Tayeh
52. Saleh Abdulkarim Shehadeh Al-Armouti
53. Good morning Freej logo
54. Saddah Ahmed Mohammed Al-Habashneh
55. Safaa Abdullah Mohammed Al Momani
56. Fountains ask for balconies
57. Tarek Sami Hanna Khoury
58. Atef Youssef Saleh Al-Tarawneh
59. Abdul Ali Muhammad Alyan Al-Mahsiri
60. Abdul Rahman Hussain Muhammad Al-Awaysha
61. Abdul Qadir Salman Nuri Al-Fishikat Al-Azaydah
62. Abdul Karim Faisal Dhaifallah Al-Daghmi
63. Abdullah Badi’ Muhammad Abdul-Dayem Al-Qaramas
64. Abdullah Ali Odeh Akaileh
65. Abdullah Ghanem Suleiman Zureikat
66. Abdullah Qassem Mohammed Obeidat
67. Abdel Moneim Saleh Shehadeh Al-Awdat
68. Adnan Saeed Mohammed Al-Rakibat
69. Aziz Muhammad Ali Salman Al-Obaidi
70. His mind is ghamar moflih the customer
71. Ali Khalaf Radwan Al-Hajjaj
72. Ali Salem Fadel Al-Khalayleh
73. Alia Odeh Nassar Abu Halil
74. Omar Sobhi Shehadeh Qaraqish
75. Awwad Mohammed Salman Al-Zawaida
76. Issa Ali Issa Khashasnah
77. Ghazi Muhammad Salem Al-Hawamleh
78. Fudayl Munawwar Fudayl Al-Nahar Al-Manasir Al-Abadi
79. Silver blood money Abdullah Faleh Abu Qaddoura
80. Fawaz Mahmoud Mufleh Al Zoubi
81. Fawzy Shaker Taima Daoud
82. Faisal Nayef Gad Al-Awar
83. Qusai Ahmed Abdel Hamid Al-Domaisi
84. Qais Khalil Yaqoub Ziyadin
85. Kamal Ahmed Mohamed Al-Zogoul
86. Majed Mahmoud Hassan Qweism
87. Mazen Turki Saud Al-Qadi
88. Majhem Hamad Hussein Al-Suqur
89. Pros of Manizil Attia Al-Sharaa
90. Muhammad Jamil Muhammad Al-Zahrawi
91. Muhammad Husayn Muhammad Abu Sitta al-Ayasra
92. Mohammed Rashid Odeh Al-Braiseh
93. Mohamed Saad Salama Al-Atayqa
94. Muhammad Daif Allah Suleiman Al-Falahat
95. Mohamed Abdel Fattah Mahmoud Hodeeb
96. Muhammad Ali Hassan Al-Riyati
97. Mohammed Nasser Salim Al Zoubi
98. Muhammad Noah Ali worshiping judges
99. Mahmoud Ahmed Al-Saud Al-Adwan
100. Mahmoud Jamil Khalaf Al-Farahid
101. Mahmoud Khalaf Hamad Al-Naimat
102. Mahmoud Atallah Younes Titi
103. Maram Muslim Ali Al-Hisa
104. Marzouq Hamad Awad Al-Habarneh Al-Dajh
105. Mustafa Ramadan Abdel Qader Yaghi
106. Mustafa Abdul Rahman Mazen Al-Assaf
107. Mustafa Fouad Muhammad Al-Khasawneh
108. Musleh Ahmed Musa Tarawneh
109. Moataz Muhammad Musa Abu Rumman
110. Muflih Muhammad Muflih Al-Khazaleh
111. Manal Ali Abdul Rahman Al-Damour
112. Muntaha Abdel-Gawad Ahmed Al-Baoul
113. Mansour Seif El-Din Mourad Sajaja
114. Musa Barakat Saud Al-Zawahra
115. Musa Ali Muhammad al-Wahsh
116. Musa Ali Muhammad Hantash
117. Nabil Kamel Ahmed Al Shishani
118. Nabil Mikhail Odeh Al-Ghishan
119. Nassar Hassan Salem Al-Qaisi
120. Nidal Mahmoud Ahmed Al-Taani
121. Nawaf Hussein Farhan Al-Nuaimat
122. Nawaf Muqbel Salman Al Mualla Al Zayoud
123. Hoda Hussein Mohammed Al-Atoum
124. Haya Hussein Ali Muflih Al-Shibli Al-Abadi
125. Haitham Jeries The return of Al-Zayadin
126. Wael Moussa Youssef Razzouk
127. Wasfi Hilal Abdullah Haddad
128. Wafaa Saeed Yaqoub Bani Mustafa
129. Yahya Muhammad Mahmoud Al-Saud
130. Youssef Muhammad Yusuf Al-Jarrah
