= Ibtisam Youssef Khalil Al-Nawafleh =

Jordanian politician (born 1967)

Ibtisam Youssef Khalil Al-Nawafleh (born 1967) is a Jordanian politician from Ma'an Governorate. She is a member of the House of Representatives.

== See also ==
- 18th Parliament of Jordan
