= Ibtisam Mahameed =

Palestinian peace and women's rights activist

- ابتسام محاميد
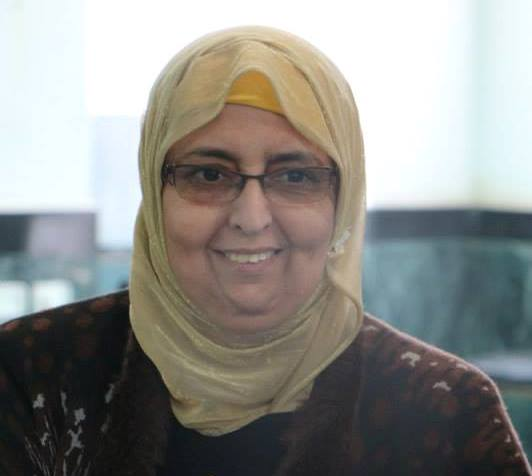
- Mahameed in 2018
- Born: 1960 or 1961; Fureidis, Haifa District, Israel
- Citizenship: Israeli

Ibtisam Mahameed (Arabic: ابتسام محاميد; born 1960 or 1961) is a Palestinian peace activist, women's rights activist, and interfaith activist. She is a citizen of Israel.

== Personal life ==
Mahameed's family originates from Tantura. She was born in and lives in Fureidis, Israel. Fureidis had no high school, so she was one of two girls in her class who attended high school in Haifa. She is Muslim. Mahameed married when she was 15. She has three children with her husband, Sobhi.

Beginning in her 40s, Mahameed pursued a degree in psychology and social science and a doctorate in anthropology.

== Activism ==
Mahameed became interested in activism following an incident in 1995, when a bus driver discriminated against her; the case was closed by authorities for lack of interest. The incident marked several changes for Mahameed. She began wearing more traditional Arab clothing, realizing that dressing in a secular manner did not protect her from discrimination. She also became more interested in history, and began trying to think about the incident from the perspective of the bus driver. She credits this event with starting her work of making people understand 'the other side'.

Mahameed became involved in interfaith work after taking a course with Na’amat, an Israeli Jewish women’s organization. There, she met and bonded with Christian, Jewish, and Druze women. Mahameed and two Jewish women from Zichron Ya’acov founded the Brotherhood Peace Foundation. As of 2012, the foundation's meetings drew around 1,000 people.

In 1998, Mahameed ran for mayor of Fureidis, winning 200 votes in total. Although she was supported by her husband, she received backlash from other members of the community, who thought it improper that she enter politics. Later that year, she traveled to Berlin for a United Religions Initiative-organized summit on peacemaking. While there, she bonded closely with her Jewish roommate, Elana Rozenman, and the two remained friends after returning to Israel in April 2002.

Mahameed and Rozenman launched an interfaith study group, which was attended by around 200 women. She has since been involved with a number of interfaith and women's empowerment groups, including the Center for Hagar and Sarah, Peace Begins from Within, and Women Reborn. She is on the steering committee of SHIN, Israeli Movement for Equal Representation of Women.

Mahameed and Rozenman attended the 2004 Parliament of the World’s Religions in Barcelona together.

Mahameed attended the 2009 Parliament of the World’s Religions in Melbourne.

Speaking on how religion influences her activism, Mahameed said, "If I consider myself a peace activist, then all my words and actions must be devoted to peace. For me this is Jihad, and if I die doing this I will be considered a martyr".

In 2014, Mahameed co-wrote the prayers "Prayer of Mothers for Life and Peace" and "Candle for Peace" with Rabbi Tamar Elad-Appelbaum. She has presented readings with Elad-Appelbaum at interfaith marches.

== Awards and recognitions ==
In 2006, By the Well of Sarah and Hagar, a play based on Mahameed and fellow activist Dorit Bat Shalom, toured in the United States.

=== Awards ===
- 2007 Woman of the Year, Israel Woman’s Parliament
- 2009 Award for Unsung Heroes of Compassion, given by the Dalai Lama
- 2010 Woman of the Year in Women’s Leadership, People of the Year in Palestinian Society
