= Abdali area =

Coordinates: 31°57′52″N 35°54′23″E

Abdali العبدلي
- Area
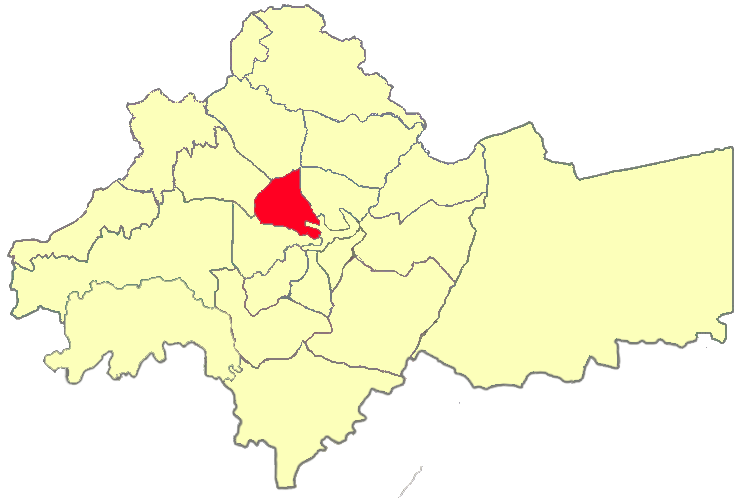
- Abdali location in Amman Governorate

- Flag
- Interactive map of Abdali
- Country: Jordan
- Governorate: Amman Governorate

Area
  - Area: 15 km^{2} (5.8 sq mi)
- Elevation: 800–970 m (2,620–3,180 ft)

Population
  - Urban: 165,333

Abdali (Arabic: العبدلي) is an area in the Greater Amman Municipality, Jordan. It is named for King Abdullah I who founded it in the 1940s. It covers an area of 15 square kilometres (6 sq mi) in the heart of Amman, with a population of 165,333 in 2015. Large parts of the district are residential, and it also has several important government buildings and businesses. The area has several bus stations.

== Neighborhoods ==
The district consists of 4 neighborhoods Jabal Al-Hussein, Jabal Al-Lweibdeh, Shmeisani, and Al-Madineh Al-Riyadiyah. Jabal Al-Hussein and Jabal Al-Lweibdeh are among the oldest neighborhoods in the city, they have been marked by the Greater Amman Municipality as of great historical significance. They are preferred by several western expatriates who work or study in Amman, as their accommodate.

A part of the Shmeisani neighborhood is residential, however, the other part contains several companies, banks, hospitals, schools and governmental buildings. Most notably; Al-Iskan Bank Building, Jordan Hospital, King Abdullah I Mosque, Parliament of Jordan building, Palace of Justice, Royal Cultural Center, Princess Haya Cultural Center, National Orthodox School, Rosary College for girls and numerous embassies. The Al-Madineh Al-Riyadiyah neighborhood contains Al Hussein Sports City while the rest of it is mostly residential.

== Gallery ==
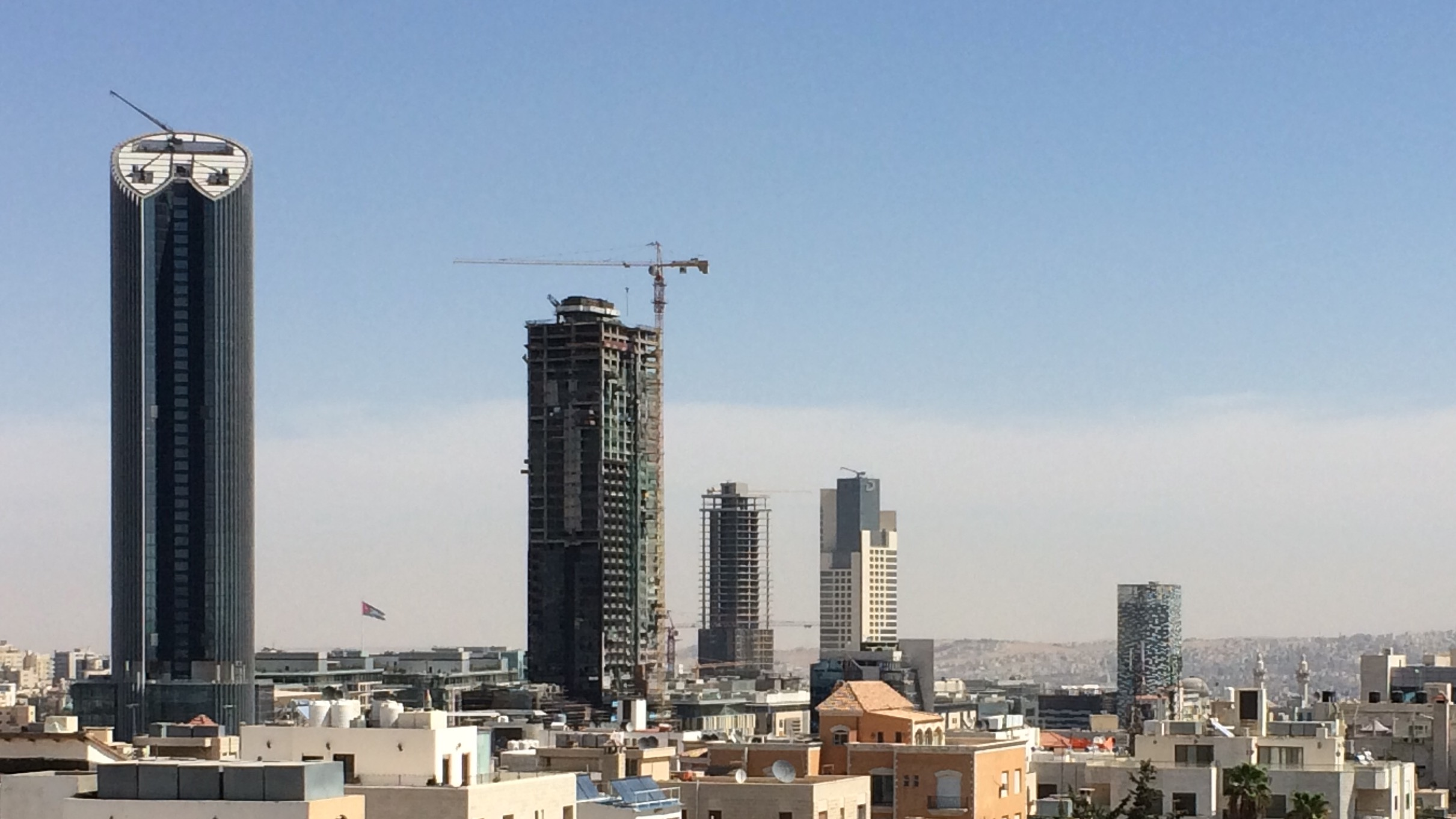
View of Abdali Project

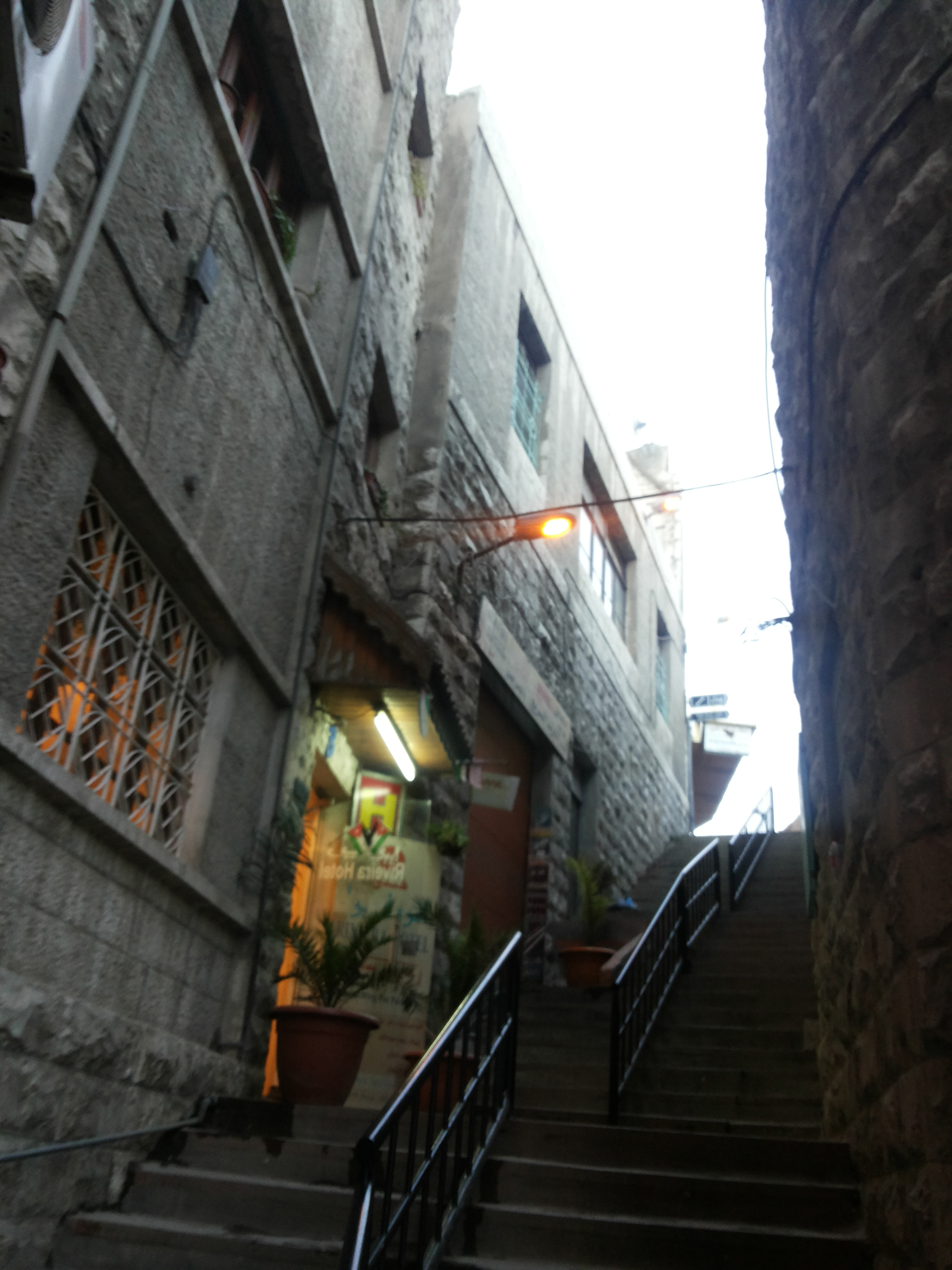
Stairs in Jabal Al-Lweibdeh

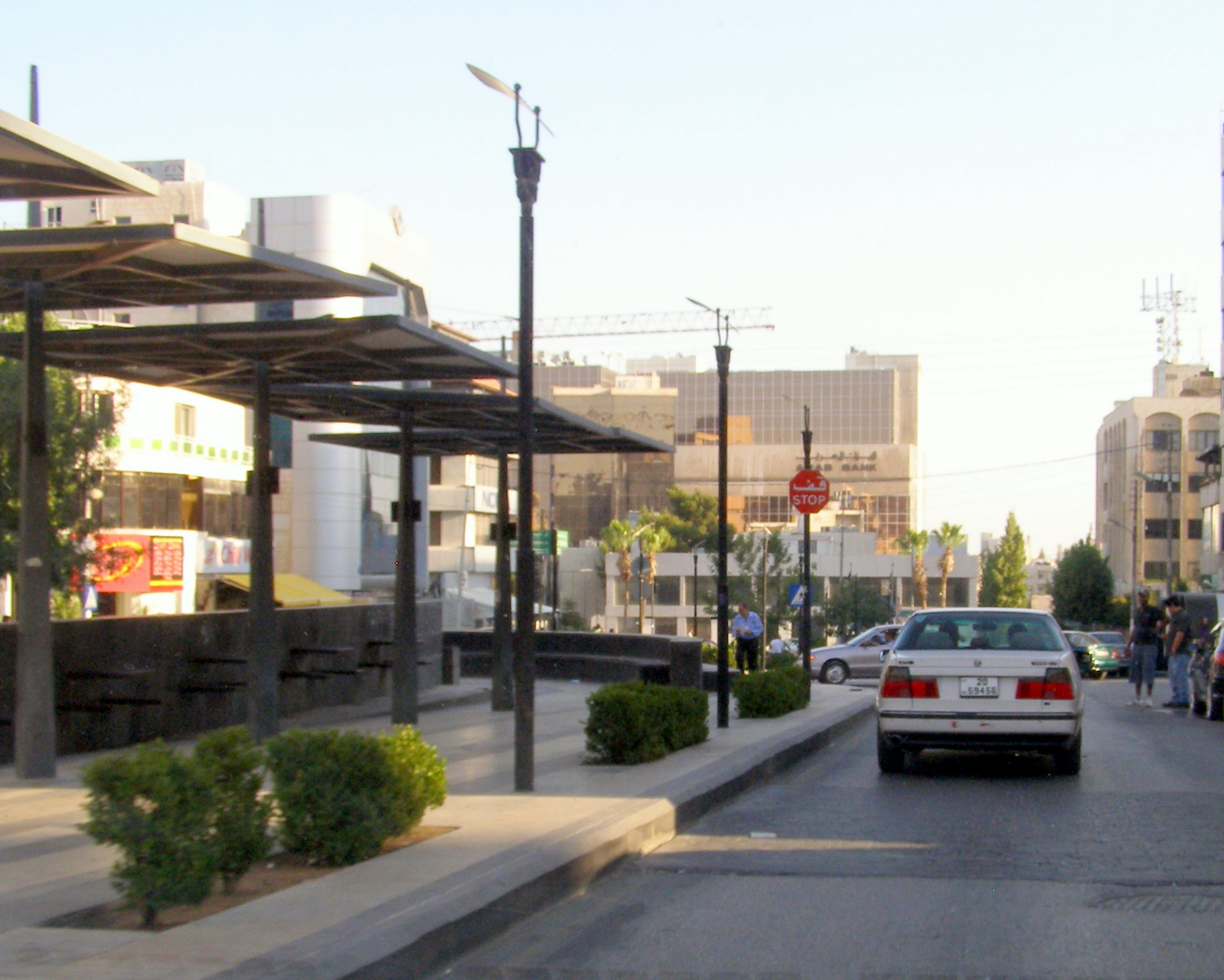
Thaqafa street in Shmeisani

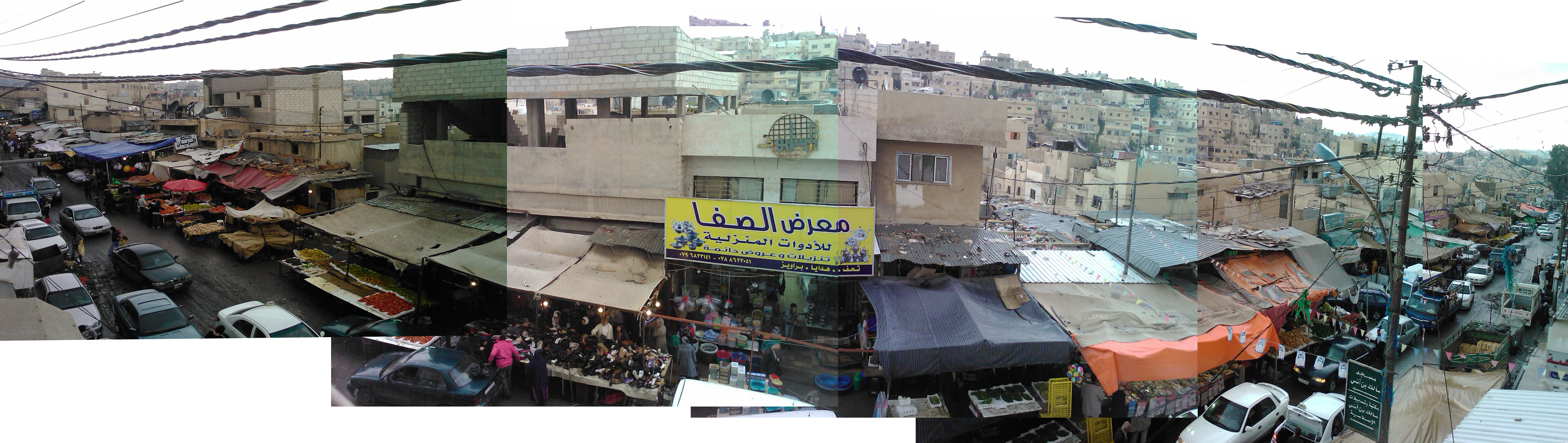
Jabal el-Hussein camp is one of four camps to accommodate refugees who left Palestine as a result of the 1948 Arab-Israeli war.
