= Shmeisani =

Al Shumaysani شميساني
- Neighborhood
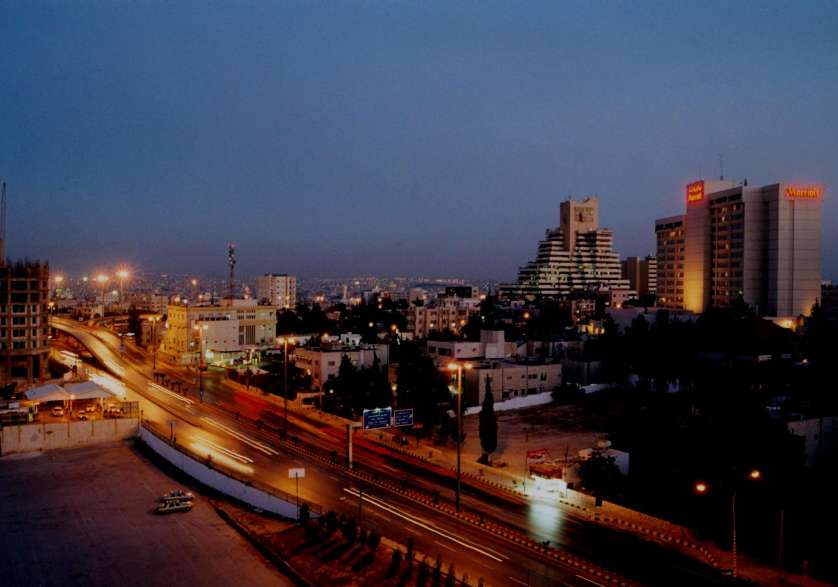

- Location in Jordan
- Coordinates: 31°58′N 35°55′E
- Country: Jordan
- Governorate: Amman Governorate
- Time zone: UTC + 2

Al Shumaysani is a neighborhood in the Al-Abdali district of the Amman Governorate in north-western Jordan.
