= Tel Mevorakh =

Ancient tell on the Sharon Plain, Israel

Tel Mevorakh (32.5336°N 34.9267°E; Hebrew: תל מבורך, Arabic: Tell Mbarak تلّ مبارك) is a small mound situated on the southern bank of Nahal Taninim (River of the Crocodiles) in Israel. The tel does not exceed 1 dunam (0.25 acres) but rises to a height of 15 metres (50 ft) above its surrounding plain. The site contains some fifteen layers of human settlement, which accumulate to a height of 8 meters, meaning the natural hill does not exceed a height of 7 meters. It is located on the border between the wide Sharon Plain and the coast of Mount Carmel.

Tel Mevorakh had four seasons of excavation in August and September of 1973–1975 and September 1976. The excavations were supervised by the Institute of Archaeology of the Hebrew University of Jerusalem and headed by Ephraim Stern.

== Identification ==
The name "Tel Mevorakh" is the Hebrew variation of the original Arabic name "Tall al-Mubarak", which like the Hebrew name, means "Blessed Mound". The name has no traces in any written sources. One likely identification is "Crocodilompolis", mentioned in sources from the fourth century BCE. This settlement is named after the stream which is located next to. But Crocodilonpolis is usually identified with Tel Taninim, just west of Tel Mevorakh. Therefore, Tel Mevorakh hasn't been identified yet.

== Geography ==
The mound is considered very small in comparison to other sites in the country. Its location, near the Mediterranean Coast, on the border between the wide Sharon plain and the narrow coast of Mount Carmel, which is bound by the mountain slopes to east and swamps to the west, has strategical significance as it makes it an obligatory passage for everyone who travels along the Via Maris international trade route from south to north and from north to south. The mound's position on the southern bank of the Taninim River is also important, as the small but steady stream provides the site with fresh water. Despite these important geographic benefits, the small size did not allow a significant settlement to exist in the site.

== Archaeology ==
=== Middle Bronze Age ===
Tel Mevorakh had a significant occupation during the Middle Bronze II. According to the excavations directed by Ephraim Stern between 1973 and 1976, the MBA occupation is divided into several strata (primarily Strata XV–XIII).

In Early MB IIA (Stratum XV–XIV), the earliest settlement consisted of a rectangular mudbrick fortress. Stern suggested this may have been established by the Egyptians or served as a local administrative outpost. In Late MB IIA The site expanded beyond the fortress, with residential buildings eventually covering the entire small mound.

In MB IIB (Stratum XIII), the settlement was developed and encircled by a high earthen rampart (a typical Canaanite fortification style of this period). A new military fortress or garrison was constructed in the center of the mound, which remained in use until the end of the Middle Bronze Age.

=== Late Bronze Age ===
In the Late Bronze Age, a temple (three superimposed sanctuaries) was located at the site as a "road sanctuary" along the important coastal trading route, and subsidiary to Tel Dor. The natural landscape was dominated by the Taninim River and the Kabara Marsh.

=== Iron Age ===
==== Iron IB ====
A structure from the late 11th century BCE was discovered, Pottery found there include much local pottery as well as a single jug of Phoenician origin. This structure was destroyed.

==== Iron IIA ====
A new structure dated the second half of the 10th century BCE was built on top of it. It is a four room house, a type of house associated with early Israelites. The large house underwent many changes and most of its bricks were plundered. It was encircled by an outer wall and was surrounded by a large court. Archaeologists believe it is a regional administrative center, connected to the nearby city of Dor. The pottery found here was local. Two fine cooking pots of special interest were found, one of which with the Paleo-Hebrew letter "Shin". Such cooking pots with letters such as "Shin" and "Samekh" were found in other sites including Tel Hazor in the Korazim Plateau, Tel Yokneam and Tel Qiri in the Jezreel Valley and in Tel Shikmona in Haifa. The meaning of these signs is obscure. A tomb, contemporary with the house was discovered northeast of the mound in 1966 during the construction of a pipeline. In addition to the local pottery, some pottery imported from Cyprus and Phoenicia was found both in the house and in the tomb.

=== Persian period ===
The excavation has discovered three complete settlement layers from the Persian period. The bottom layer is a large deep pit. It is unclear whether the site was settled at this time, but the pottery inside the pit dates it to around 450 BCE. The middle layer contained a structure that covered the western side of the mound, which seems to have been a large farm. The pottery found there, which includes imported Greek pottery, allows us to date it to between 450 and 325 BCE. Most of the remains of the structure were lost due to the construction of a new structure, found at the top layer. This structure much larger than in the previous layer and extends beyond the excavation area. It was probably surrounded by casemate walls. The structure, which was probably an agricultural estate, is dated to between 350 and 333 BCE. The structure may have had towers and a second floor, but this is hard to determine, as it only survived to its foundations.

=== Hellenistic period ===
Between the Persian settlement and the Hellenistic settlement, there seems to be a gap of a century. The Hellenistic layer of the mound was badly damaged by erosion, due to a long time of abandonment, as well as the crusader and Muslim graves dug deep into the mound. N. Makhouly noted in 1924 that the looting of the stones from this period continued in his days. The Hellenistic period is divided into two phases of construction, both dated to around the 2nd century BCE. The pottery found in this layer is mostly Hellenistic and seems to be replicas either locally made or imported from nearby mediterranean regions such as Egypt, Syria and Turkey. The poor state of the layer doesn't allow us to see the plan of the settlement. The remains can be seen as part of a masonry.

=== Roman and Byzantine periods ===
Tel Mevorakh and its surroundings were incorporated into the territory of the city of Caesarea, which was built by Herod the Great in the first century CE. It seems the site was deserted during these periods. Only a few isolated finds such as potsherds and coins were found. All of these were probably dumped by the citizens of Caesarea, who worked in the region. These pottery and coins date to all of the Roman and Byzantine periods. The only architectural discovery is a wall, on the northern slope, dated to the Roman period, whose purpose is not clear.

There are two structures in the immediate vicinity of the mound from the Roman period. The first is a mausoleum, built inside a big cemetery on the mounds eastern slope. The mausoleum was excavated by N. Makhouly in 1924. The ashlar-built structure contained two sculptured marble Sarcophagi, decorated with scenes from Greek mythology. The Mausoleum seems to belong to a wealthy family and it is dated to the 3rd century CE. The second structure is part of an aqueduct which served as part of Caesarea's water supply. It runs some 100 meters south of the mound. It was constructed by Herod the Great and was rebuilt by Hadrian. On part of the aqueduct, there are inscriptions of the Legio X Fretensis, one with an insignia as well as depictions of Nike and Atlas, two figures from the Greek mythology. Inscriptions of Legio VI Ferrata, Legio II Traiana Fortis and another unknown legion were also discovered.

=== Crusader-Muslim cemetery ===
The mound's summit is covered with graves. A total of 42 graves were excavated, and there are probably many others not found. The mound probably used as a cemetery for a long time, as the earliest graves are attributed to the Crusaders and the latest to the 19th century AD. The mound was used by the Arab villagers of the nearby Jisr az-Zarqa village as a graveyard. The graves can be divided into four types: Simple cist graves, dug into the soft soil, which amount to about a dozen; Rectangular cist graves, surrounded by stone slabs, which were probably from the Roman remains. These graves were dug deep and damaged some of the earlier layers. They included mostly the skeletons of adults. In one of the graves, a silver crusader coin attributed to Amaury I of Jerusalem (AD 1162-1174). The grave included three glass plaquettes, probably used as superstitious or magical items. They were dated to the 12th or 13th century AD. Some of the graves included some jewelry made of iron, bronze, glass and some semi-precious stones. This kind of jewelry usually belong to Arab peasants (Fellah) or nomads (Bedouin); One grave has a different shape than all others, as it was covered by small stones and contained the skeleton of an adult. The last group of graves were jar burials of four children. These burials are probably the latest in the site and are dated to the mid-19th century AD. All of the graves were oriented east-west when the bodies are facing south, towards Mecca, in accordance to Muslim tradition. Late Ottoman infant jar-burials are often associated with nomads or itinerant workers of Egyptian origins.

== Bibliography ==
- Ephraim Stern, "Excavations at Tel Mevorakh (1973–1976). Part One: From the Iron Age to the Roman Period", Qedem, Vol. 9, 1978
- Ephraim Stern, "Excavations at Tel Mevorakh (1973–1976). Part Two: The Bronze Age", Qedem, Vol. 18, 1984
