= Tel Burga =

- תל בורגה (Hebrew)
- Location within Israel
- 32°31′15.0312″N 34°57′50.8242″E
- Location: Binyamina, Sharon Plain Israel

Tel Burga is an archaeological site in the Sharon Plain, 1 kilometre (0.62 mi) east of Binyamina, Israel. The site was excavated in 2004 on behalf of the Israeli Antiquities Authority. The Israel Electric Company requested and funded the excavation prior to the erection of two new high-voltage pylons in the area.

== Location and topography ==
Tel Burga is located in the Sharon Plain, 1 kilometre (0.62 mi) east of the city of Binyamina, and roughly 5.5 kilometres (3.4 mi) from the Mediterranean Sea on the Israeli coast. The site is a tell, a natural mound made of layers of debris and human settlements, creating a man-made plateau. The area consists of relatively flat coastal plan besides the man-made mound and is roughly 23 meters above sea level. The tell itself is roughly 10 meters high.

Extensive surveys of the site have revealed a large oval shaped tell of 250 dunams (0.25 km^{2}; 0.097 sq mi), which makes up the size of the ancient human settlement, encircled by an artificial rampart. The rampart showcases a strong fortification once surrounded the site.

== History ==
Tel Burga was a small fortified site strategically located between larger cities in Canaan in a position to support growing urban culture during the Middle Bronze Age. Archaeological surveys on site identified the remains of at least two towers and a wall, as well as ceramic remains from various periods, starting with the Chalcolithic; Early, Intermediate and Middle Bronze and Iron Ages. Roman and Medieval artifacts were also found.

=== Middle Bronze Age ===
In the Middle Bronze IIA (MB IIA), the site held a major fortified settlement. There is a large burial structure on a part of the tell. To the northwest was Tel Mevorakh (4 km) and to the north the major coastal site Tel Megadim (20 km). Other sites include Tel Esur (5 km) southeast and Tel Zeror (12 km) south.

Area A: In Area A, three adult burial pits were found with human remains alongside a stone burial structure. A young male was found buried with three scarabs and pottery, all dating to the Middle Bronze Age.

Area B: Located near the northern rampart, structures were found which included one with walls and a beat-earthen floor. A different structure with larger walls was also found with a flagstone pavement outside. Findings in Area B were also dated to the Middle Bronze Age.

In the Middle Bronze IIB (MB IIB), occupation discontinued.

== Archaeology ==
The site had been surveyed a number of times throughout the 20th century. In May–June 2004, the Israel Electric Corporation (IEC) requested and funded a salvage excavation at the site by the Israeli Antiquities Authority (IAA) ahead of infrastructure work by IEC. The excavation was led by Amir Golan, which opened two areas of the site (Areas A and B) on the mound's southern perimeter. Findings of the excavation were subsequently published in Hadashot Arkheologiyot and ‘Atiqot, both published by the IAA.

== See also ==
- Archaeology of Israel
