= Crocodilopolis (disambiguation) =

Crocodilopolis (Koinē Greek: Κροκοδειλόπολις Krokodeilópolis) was an ancient Egyptian settlement in Middle Egypt near present-day Faiyum.

Crocodilopolis may also refer to:

- Sumenu, an ancient Egyptian town in Upper Egypt
- Tel Tanninim, a hellenistic town in Israel
