= Beit Hanania =

Beit Hanania: בֵּית חֲנַנְיָה (Hebrew)
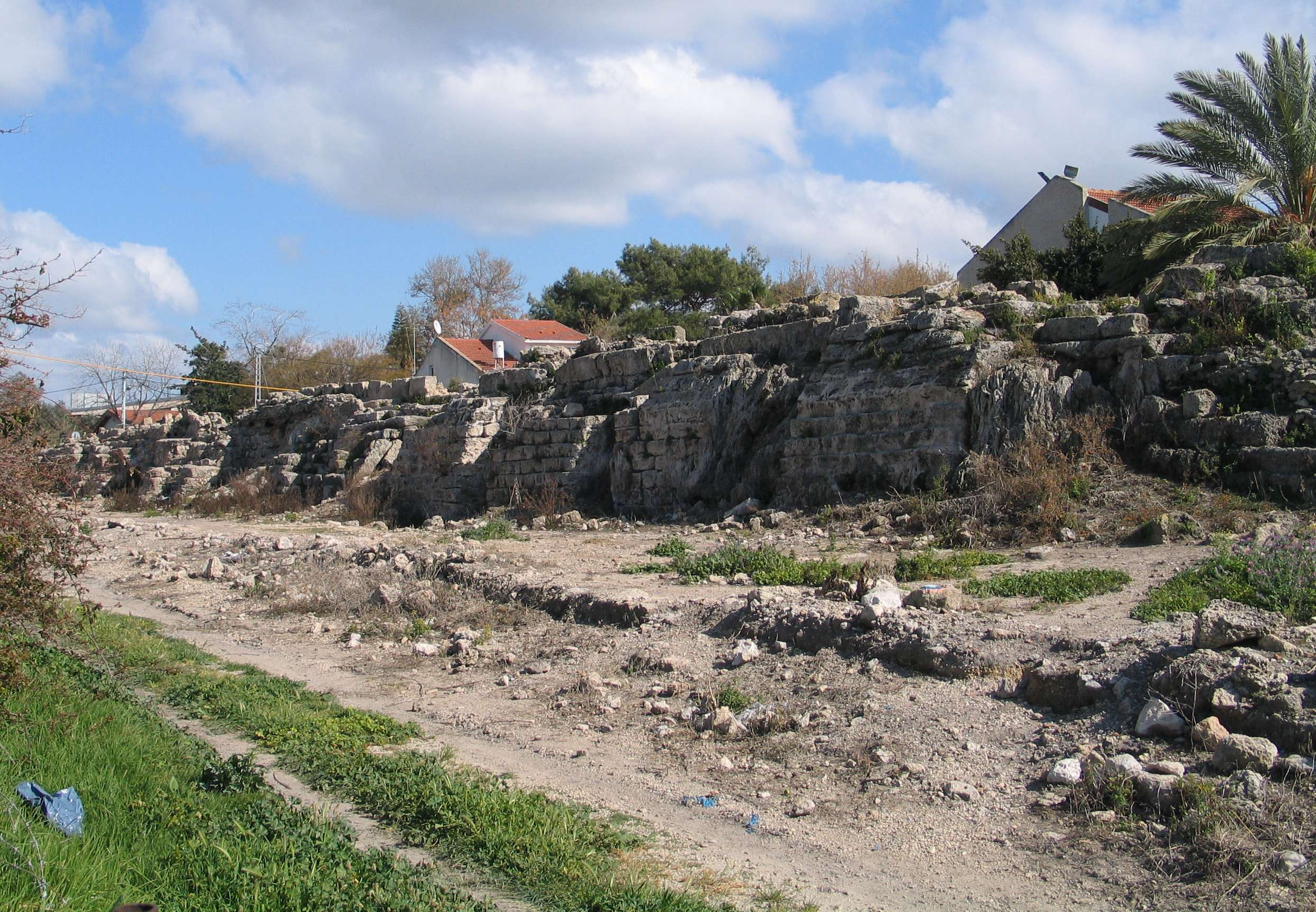

- Location within Haifa region of Israel Location within Israel
- Coordinates: 32°31′44″N 34°55′36″E
- Country: Israel
- District: Haifa
- Subdistrict: Hadera
- Council: Hof HaCarmel
- Affiliation: Moshavim Movement
- Founded: 1950
- Founder: PICA and Eastern European Jewish immigrants
- Population (2024): 821

Beit Hanania (Hebrew: בֵּית חֲנַנְיָה, lit. House of Hanania) is a moshav in northern Israel. Located close to the south edge of Mount Carmel close to Zikhron Ya'akov, it falls under the jurisdiction of Hof HaCarmel Regional Council. In 2024 it had a population of 821.

== History ==
The moshav was founded in 1950 by the Palestine Jewish Colonization Association (PICA) and Jewish immigrants from Eastern Europe on land near the Palestinian village of Kabara, which was depopulated in the 1948 Palestine war. The new village was named after Hanania Gottlib, a leader of the PICA.

The Israel National Trail runs through the moshav. An aqueduct built in Hadrian's time is located at its entrance, whilst the Taninim River Nature Reserve is located nearby. The Taninim River flows through the park, both of which are named after the alligators (תנינים, Taninim) that, until the beginning of the 20th century, lived in the nearby Cabra swamp.
