= Kabara =

Kabara may refer to:

- Kabara (title), for certain Hausa matriarchal rulers
- Kabara, Haifa, former Palestinian Arab village
- Kabara (Fiji), island of Fiji in the Lau archipelago
- Kabara, Mali, town in Mali on the Niger River, the port for Timbuktu
