= Tel Zeror =

Archaeological tel in Israel

- תל זרור (Hebrew)
- Tel Dhurer
- Location within Israel
- 32.42931°N 34.971371°E
- Type: settlement, burial grounds
- Periods: Middle Bronze Age, Late Bronze Age, Iron Age. Persian Period, Hellenistic Period, Roman Period, Byzantine Period. Mameluke Period, Late Islamic Period, Ottoman Period, British Mandate.
- Cultures: Canaanite, Philistine (?)
- Location: Israel
- Region: Northern Sharon Plain

History
- Built: circa 20th century BCE
- Abandoned: 1948

Site notes
- Area: 50 dunams/5 hectares
- Excavation dates: 1964-1966
- Archaeologists: Kiyoshi Ohata, Moshe Kochavi
- Public access: yes

Tel Zeror is an archaeological tel on the Sharon Plain, approximately four km east of Hadera, SE of Kibbutz Gan Shmuel and south of Moshav Talmei Elazar. The tel, unconventionally, has two peaks, and between them is a field. The site is just south of the convergence of three small waterways; the Hadera Stream, Wadi Ara, and Nahal Yitzhak, where they continue westward as the Hadera Stream.

Tel Zeror is sometimes identified with Zrar, a city mentioned in the description of Thutmosis III's conquests, from the fifteenth century BCE. Another possibility is that the site is Machtar, from the same description.

== History ==
=== Middle Bronze ===
The Middle Bronze Age IIA city was fortified with a city wall, built of earth, mud-bricks and stone, and surrounded by a moat. The wall was 4.5 meters wide, and a watch tower was incorporated in it. The moat was 10 meters wide. The depth of its lowest course is unknown, because the excavators reached groundwater and could not dig further. At some point the wall was destroyed and then renewed.

Tel Zeror seems to have been abandoned from the 18th century BCE, and not resettled until the early 15th century BCE.

=== Late Bronze ===
By the Late Bronze Age (LB), the site was unfortified, but boasted large buildings and an industrial copper-working quarter with smelting furnaces, crucibles, and large amounts of copper slag. Cypriot ceramic ware was found in this quarter, probably originating from the same source as the copper itself, that is, Cyprus.

Two types of LB burials were found at the site; graves lined with cut stones that contained burial offerings, and pit burials. In both types, positioning was on the back, facing west. Tentative dating suggests the 13th century BCE.

=== Iron Age ===
In the Iron Age (11th century BCE), the site had a large mud-brick citadel, and a casemate wall. Four room houses of this period were discovered, as well. A bowl inscribed in ancient Hebrew was found on the southern hill. The inscription reads "to the god Semech" or possibly "El is my support".

Iron Age burials in storage jars were found at Tel Zeror.

The site was continually occupied until it was destroyed in the eighth century BCE by the invading Assyrians, and then resettled later in the sixth century BCE.

=== Hellenistic Period ===
During the Hellenistic period there was a rounded watch tower on the northern hill, with a spiral staircase, for an agriculturally oriented settlement ("manor farm").

=== Byzantine Period ===
In the Byzantine period, the area south of the tel was populated.

=== Middle Ages ===
In the Mamluke period there was a town on the southern hill called Tel a-Dhurer. In the 13th and 14th centuries CE, the northern hill became a Muslim burial ground. Burials were simple or stone-lined, bodies positioned on the side, with the face to the south. Tel a-Dhurer existed until 1948.

== Archaeology ==
Tel Zeror was first excavated in 1928 by John Garstang, who spent a single day at the site. It was the first proper tel in the Sharon Plain to be excavated. In the 1960s, a Japanese expedition spent three seasons uncovering a fortified, 50-dunam city, and returned in 1974 for an additional season.
