= Ma'ayan Tzvi =

Kibbutz in north-central Israel

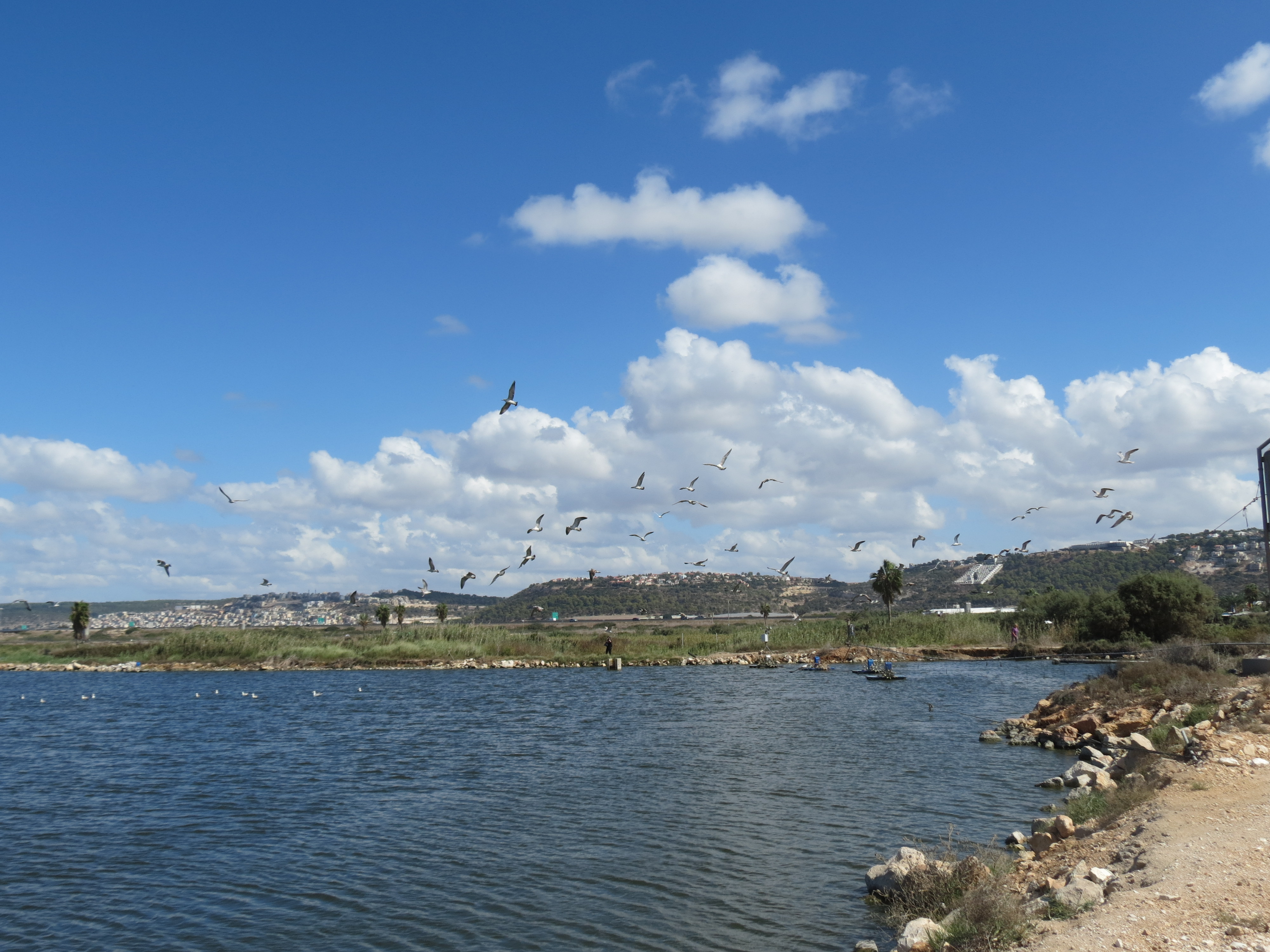

- Location within Haifa region of Israel
- Coordinates: 32°33′59″N 34°56′24″E
- Country: Israel
- District: Haifa
- Subdistrict: Hadera
- Council: Hof HaCarmel
- Affiliation: Kibbutz Movement
- Founded: 30 August 1938
- Founder: Austrian, Czechoslovak and German Jewish refugees
- Population (2024): 810

Ma'ayan Tzvi (Hebrew: מַעְיַן צְבִי, lit. 'Zvi's Spring') is a kibbutz in northern Israel. Located near Zikhron Ya'akov, it falls under the jurisdiction of Hof HaCarmel Regional Council. In 2024 it had a population of 810.

== History ==
The kibbutz was established 30 August 1938 as part of the tower and stockade settlement project by members of the Maccabi youth movement who fled from Nazi Germany. At first, the kibbutz was called Ma'ayan. It was established on land located near the Palestinian village of Kabera.

In 1945, the name Zvi was added in honor of Zvi Frank, a Zionist activist and one of the heads of the Jewish Colonization Association which purchased the kibbutz lands.

The kibbutz manufactures optical devices and components for high-tech and advanced weapon systems.
