= Tel Zomera =

- Tell Sheikh Abu Faraj, ed-Dumeiri
- Location within Israel
- Type: Tell
- Periods: Late Bronze Age, Iron Age II–III, Persian, Hellenistic, Roman, Byzantine, Early Islamic and Ottoman periods
- Location: Sharon Plain, Israel

Tel Zomera (also known as Tell Sheikh Abu Faraj and ed-Dumeiri) is an archaeological site located near the northern bank of the Hadera Stream. The site is situated on a kurkar hill in the Sharon plain. It contains evidence of a continuous sequence of human settlement from the Late Bronze Age (the end of the second millennium BCE) until the Early Islamic period (the end of the first millennium CE), as well as the remains of a Byzantine church and an Ottoman-period cemetery.

== Archaeological remains ==
Tel Zomera was surveyed as part of the Hadera Map Survey (Map No. 53) by the Israel Antiquities Authority, initially by a survey team led by Yehuda Ne'eman in 1973–1978, and later in 1998 by Shlomo Sander and Eldad Oren. At the site (designated as Site No. 28 in the survey), walls, dressed stones, the remains of a Byzantine-period church, and an Ottoman-period cemetery were uncovered.

During the survey, pottery shreds were collected from the Late Bronze Age, Iron Age II–III, Persian, Hellenistic, Roman, Byzantine, Early Islamic, and Ottoman periods. The pottery belongs to standard domestic vessels such as bowls, kraters, cooking pots, and jars. Additionally, several unique artifacts were discovered: a bronze dagger blade from the Late Bronze Age decorated at its base with two birds; a bone figurine of a carved figure (undated); and a bone cloth doll from the Early Islamic period.

The documented remains of the Byzantine church included an apse, which was most likely destroyed by modern development activity. Scholar Joseph Patrich studied the churches and monasteries in the rural hinterland of Caesarea (located approximately 7 km southwest of Tel Zomera), which served as the capital of the province of Palaestina Prima. In his view, the church served the local rural population of the site rather than functioning as a monastery. About 200 meters west of the site, a salvage excavation was conducted in 2009 on behalf of the Israel Antiquities Authority, directed by Abdallah Massarwa. The excavation documented a structure and installations dating to the Byzantine period. Due to the poor state of preservation and the limited scope of the excavation, it was difficult to determine the exact nature and function of the structure, but it provides clear evidence of Byzantine activity in the area west of the tell.

=== Bone cloth doll from Early Islamic period ===
The bone cloth doll head discovered during the survey dates to the Early Islamic period (from the late 7th century to the 11th century CE). These bone figurines, often erroneously referred to in research as 'Coptic dolls,' are mostly found in domestic contexts and trash pits. The updated scholarly consensus views them as toys and play dolls for children rather than ritual objects or magical amulets, though they may have also carried an educational role in preparing young girls for motherhood. Stylistically, the facial features engraved on the doll head from Tel Zomera, such as the eyes and eyebrows, exhibit a careless or relatively simple execution. This style characterizes a local carving tradition found at more northern and eastern sites in Palestine and Jordan, in contrast to the more meticulously crafted figurines produced in Egypt. The doll was originally left without engraved hair because such heads were typically fitted with wigs made of wool or human hair, while the head itself was attached to a body made of layered cloth filled with rags.
