= Ephraim Stern =

Israeli archaeologist (1934–2018)

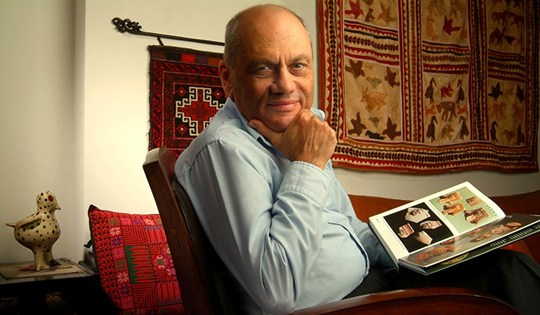
Ephraim Stern, 2005

Ephraim Stern (Hebrew: אפרים שטרן; January 15, 1934 – March 23, 2018) was an Israeli archaeologist and professor at the Hebrew University of Jerusalem. He specialized in the archaeology of ancient Israel and Judah and Phoenicia, and was known for his excavations at Tel Dor (1980–2000). He received the EMET Prize in 2005.

== Early life and family ==
Stern was born in Haifa in 1934. He graduated from the Hebrew Reali School and joined the newly-established Israel Defense Forces in 1952. He served in the Second Arab–Israeli War (1956), the Six-Day War (1967) and the Yom Kippur War (1973), rising to the rank of major.

Stern's parents both died in 1953, leaving him to support his younger brother. He married Tamar Brutzkus in 1960 and settled in Jerusalem. They had two sons.

== Academic career ==
Stern started his academic career at the Hebrew University of Jerusalem, where he studied in the Departments of Archaeology and History of the Jewish People. After completing an MA, he began teaching in the Department of Archaeology at Tel Aviv University, receiving a PhD in 1968. He returned to the Hebrew University as a professor in 1971, at the invitation of Yigael Yadin. His academic expertise was the Late First Temple period, the Babylonian period and the Persian period. He also studied the culture of the Phoenicians.

Stern served as the chairman of the Hebrew University's Institute of Archaeology, the director of the Yad Ben Zvi Institute for the Research of the Land of Israel, the chairman of the Archaeological Committee of the State of Israel, and the chairman of the board of directors of the Israel Exploration Society. Over the course of his career he also held visiting professorships at London University, Harvard University, Boston University, New York University, the Annenberg Institute, and the Center for Advanced Judaic Studies in Philadelphia.

=== Excavations ===
Stern led a excavations at a number of sites, including Gilam, Tel Kadesh and Tel Mevorakh. He also worked at Massadah and Hazor, Tel Be'er Sheva, Tel Mor and En Gedi.

His most notable work was at Tel Dor, where he directed twenty seasons of excavation between 1980 and 2000, in collaboration with American archaeologists Andrew Stewart and Rainer Mack.

== Awards ==
Prof. Stern received the Israel Museum's Percia Schiemmel Award for his contributions to the archaeology of Israel. He was also awarded prizes for his various publications from Yad Ben Zvi Institute, The American Society of Biblical Archaeology and Levi Sala prize on behalf of the Ben-Gurion University in the Negev.

In 2005, Prof. Ephraim Stern was awarded with the EMET Prize for his research and professional work, which have placed him in the forefront of Israeli archaeology; for "disseminating archaeological knowledge through scientific editing and publishing; for the extensive excavations in which he has been involved as team member and director; and for his broad and in-depth knowledge of the Land of Israel and its material culture between the First Temple Period Solomon's Temple and Second Temple periods".

== Books and other publications ==
Stern published several books based on his research and field work. Further, he served as editor of the journal Qadmoniot, published by the Israel Exploration Society, and was co-editor of Cathedra, published by the Yad Ben-Zvi Institute.

=== Books ===
- New Encyclopedia of Archaeological Excavations in the Holy Land (1993, four volumes with a Supplement published in 2008)
- The material culture of the land of the Bible in the Persian period (Hebrew edition 1978, English edition 1982)
- Dor – Ruler of the Seas (Hebrew edition 1992, English editions 1994 and 1999)
- Archaeology of the Land of the Bible, Volume II: The Assyrian, Babylonian, and Persian Periods
- Eretz Israel (Volume 29: the Ephraim Stern Volume)

=== Archeological reports ===
1. The excavations at Tel Mevorakh (2 volumes, Qedem Publications, no. 9 and 18; 1978 and 1984), Institute of Archaeology, Hebrew University of Jerusalem.
2. Tel Dor excavations (2 volumes, Quedem Reports Ia-b, 1995), Institute of Archaeology, Hebrew University of Jerusalem and the Israel Exploration Society.
3. En-Gedi excavations (2007), Institute of Archaeology, Hebrew University of Jerusalem and the Israel Exploration Society.
4. Figurines and cult objects from Dor (2010), Institute of Archaeology, Hebrew University of Jerusalem and The Israel Exploration Society.
