= Dayr al-Asmar =

Archaeological site in southern Syria

- دير الأصمر (Arabic)
- Deir al-Asmar
- Location within Syria
- Interactive map of Dayr al-Asmar
- 32°50′35.0″N 36°27′53.0″E
- Type: Tell (settlement mound) and monastery
- Periods: Bronze Age, Iron Age, Roman, Byzantine, Ottoman
- Region: Hauran
- Nearest city: Nijran, Suwayda Governorate, Syria

History
- Original use: Settlement; monastery

Site notes
- Elevation: 780 m (2,560 ft)
- Area: 1.5 ha (3.7 acres)
- Archaeologists: Howard Crosby Butler; François Braemer; Jérôme Rohmer
- Condition: Ruins; partially destroyed by road/pipeline construction

Dayr al-Asmar or Deir al-Asmar (Arabic: دير الأصمر) is an archaeological site in the Hauran region of southern Syria.

== Description ==
Dayr al-Asmar is located approximately 1.5 kilometres (0.93 mi) east of the modern village of Najran, within a bend along the edge of the riverbed of Wadi al-Laja', on a plateau overlooking Wadi Abu-Dahab. The site lies at an elevation of about 780 metres (2,560 ft) above sea level and covers approximately 1.5 hectares (3.7 acres). The site comprises two archaeological sites: the western tell (settlement mound) and an eastern site containing the remains of a Byzantine monastery. Surveys have identified evidence of occupation ranging from the Bronze Age and Iron Age to the Roman, Byzantine, and Ottoman periods.

=== Tell (western site) ===
The tell is enclosed by a stone rampart. The main entrance was probably located on the southeastern side, where a ramp led into the enclosure. At the tell's summit, the remains of substantial buildings suggest a fortified structure. Additionally, a group of Bedouin graves occupies part of the summit and the rampart.

At the foot of the tell, the lower settlement consists of a series of walled enclosures containing rectangular buildings interpreted as dwellings and ancillary structures, including storage rooms and livestock pens. One well-preserved building on the lower terrace has been identified as a four-room house, with a central courtyard divided by rows of pillars and flanking elongated rooms, a plan characteristic of Iron Age domestic architecture in the southern Levant. Elsewhere, the lower settlement comprised densely arranged rectangular buildings, many attached to large enclosed compounds. Some buildings formed continuous rows along the settlement's western edge, possibly defining its outer boundary, although it remains uncertain whether they were built against an earlier enclosure wall.

A small oval structure excavated in the eastern part of the settlement may represent a Bronze Age phase of occupation. A large depression in the eastern part of the site has been interpreted as a reservoir, while an open, level area northeast of the settlement may have served as a threshing floor.

Surface finds recovered included mortars, grinders, cylindrical pestles, basalt vessels, a possible loom weight, and two basalt rings of uncertain function.

== Research history ==
The eastern site was first documented by Howard Crosby Butler, who associated it with mills in Wadi Abu-Dahab. The western site was identified by François Braemer during surveys in the 1980s. Between 2005 and 2008, construction of a road and pipeline destroyed part of the site's western edge, exposing architectural remains that were recorded in a theodolite survey conducted in 2008. The damaged areas were also partially reconstructed using satellite imagery taken before the construction works.

== Bibliography ==
=== Sources ===
- Rohmer, Jérôme (2020). Hauran VI. La Syrie du Sud de l'âge du Fer à l'annexion romaine (XIIe siècle av. J.-C. – Ier siècle apr. J.-C.). La Bibliothèque archéologique et historique (in French). Vol. 217. Beyrouth: Institut Français du Proche-Orient. pp. 127–135.
