= Sharon plain =

Central section of the coastal plain of Israel

Coordinates: 32.400°N 34.883°E

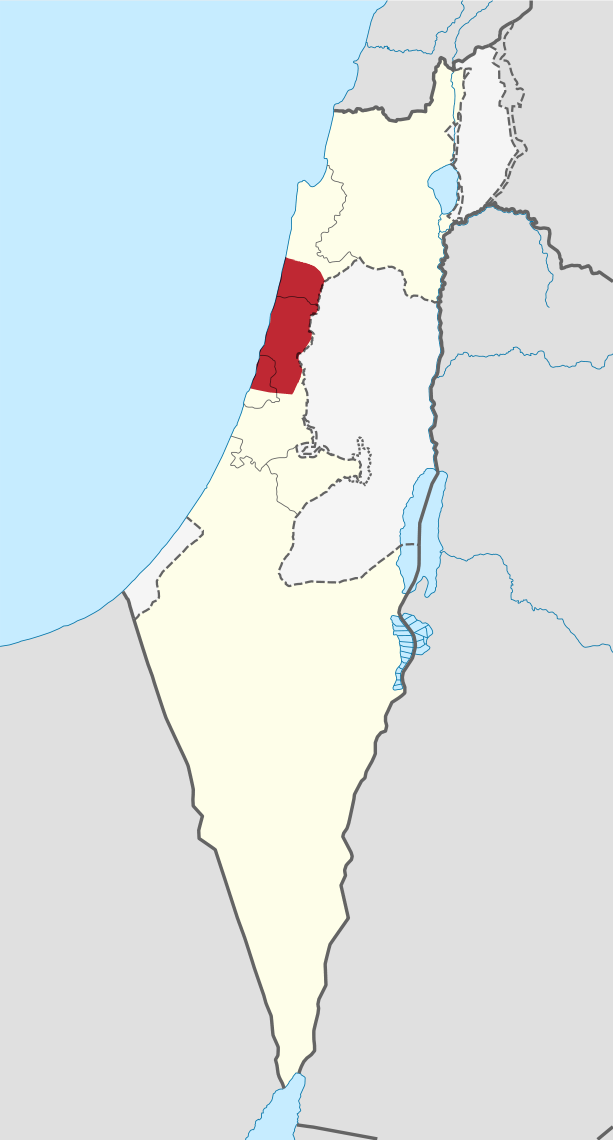
Sharon plain in Israeli Coastal Plain region

The Sharon plain (Hebrew: הַשָּׁרוֹן, romanized: HaSharon; Arabic: سهل الشارون, romanized: Sahl al-Shārūn) is the central section of the Israeli coastal plain. The name Sharon is derived from the Akkadian word "A-Sharanu" which literally translates to a "thick forest," which the area was until its deforestation in the late 19th century. The plain lies between the Mediterranean Sea to the west and the West Bank, 15 kilometres (9 1/2 miles) to the east. It stretches from Nahal Taninim, a stream marking the southern end of Mount Carmel in the north, to the Yarkon River in the south, at the northern limit of Tel Aviv, over a total distance of about 90 km (55 mi). The level of the Sharon plain is connected to the level of the Mediterranean Sea by the Sharon Escarpment.

Parts of the plain are included in the Central, Haifa and Tel Aviv Districts of Israel.

== History ==
=== Early ===
The Sharon valley is mentioned in an ancient Egyptian stele of Amenhotep II, and as the Sharon field containing both Jaffa and Dor on the Sarcophagus of Eshmunazar II.

The Plain of Sharon is mentioned in the Bible (1 Chronicles 5:16, 27:29; Book of Isaiah 33:9, 35:2, 65:10), including the famous reference to the enigmatic "Rose of Sharon" (Song of Songs 2:1).

Excavations were performed before road construction in the north part of Sharon plain. Near En Esur, an early Bronze Age planned metropolis, including a temple, stretching over 65 ha for 6,000 inhabitants, was discovered. Under the 5000-year-old city, an even older settlement from 7000 YBP has been found, according to a report from the antiquities office of Israel on 6 October 2019.

The area was historically a thick oak forest and was described as such by accounts written during the Battle of Arsuf, a battle between the forces of Richard the Lionheart and Saladin during the Third Crusade. The battle took place in the "Forest of Arsuf" in the Sharon Plain.

In the Mussaf prayer of Yom Kippur, in the discription of the sercive performed by the High Priest in the Second Temple, the Priest prays and says: "For those who lived in the region of Sharon, do not let their homes become their graves". This is because the region was known for severe floods that destroyed houses.

=== Modern ===
Before the 20th century, the region was covered by the Forest of Sharon, an open woodland dominated by Mount Tabor oak (Quercus ithaburensis), which extended from Kfar Yona in the north to Ra'ananna in the south. The area was called al-Ghāba in Arabic, "The forest, e.g. the great Oak forest of Sharon". The local Arab inhabitants traditionally used the area for pasture, firewood and intermittent cultivation. In 1851/2, van de Velde visited the plain of Sharon, and wrote: "The ground was particularly soft and swampy, owing to the waters that flow into it from the hills to the east during and aftter the rains. What a treasure all that water must be, considering the drought that generally parches this land! But still no general blessing follows. Only a few fellahins who, with their black tents of goats' hair, lie skulking in the hollows between the low hills, make any use of it."

The deforestation of the region began during the rule of the Egyptian Ibrahim Pasha in the 19th century, who had ordered that the oaks be razed so their wood could be used for heating and construction. Later, throughout World War I, the oaks were cut off to provide heating for the engines of Turkish trains of the Ottoman Empire that passed by.

81% of all Arab settlement in the Plain of Sharon were constructed on ancient sites, indicating significant continuity in the patterns of settlement from earlier periods.

Prior to 1948, the region was subordinate to Jaffa Subdistrict and Tulkarm Subdistrict. Historically, while some parts of the Sharon plain were very fertile, much of it was swampy and malarial, a condition exacerbated by massive Ottoman deforestation. Zionist immigrants arrived in the early 20th century and populated the region with many settlements.

By 1945, Jaffa Subdistrict had a population of 373,800, consisting of 71% Jewish residents and 29% Palestinian Muslim and Christian residents. Tulkarm Subdistrict had a population 86,120, consisting of 17% Jewish residents and 83% Palestinian Muslim and Christian residents. During the 1948 Arab–Israeli War, the Arab population of the region fled or were expelled almost entirely.

In 2008, it was the most densely populated region of Israel.

== Archaeology ==
The Sharon Plain has been the focus of extensive archaeological excavations, revealing a long sequence of human inhabitance from the Neolithic period to the Islamic era. The region's strategic location along ancient trade routes, combined with its fertile soils and access to fresh water, made it an important area of human development throughout history.

=== Prehistoric periods ===
==== Neolithic and Chalcolithic periods ====
The earliest findings of human settlement in the Sharon Plain dates to the Neolithic period. The most significant prehistoric site is 'En Esur, in the northern Sharon Plain at the entrance of the Wadi Ara pass. This large, multi-level proto-historic site contains a sequence of settlements from the Neolithic through Early Chalcolithic, Late Chalcolithic and Early Bronze Age periods. The site is in an area of surrounded by many springs and fertile ground, demonstrating early human adaptation to the region's environmental advantages.

Large scale archaeological excavations at 'En Esur and 'En Zippori in Lower Galilee have uncovered hundreds of sling stones dating to the Early Chalcolithic (5800–4500 BCE). The number of finds and standardisation in shape and size was interpreted by archaeologists as evidence of organised production, possibly centralised, and as a sign of warfare.

=== Bronze Age and Iron Age settlements ===
Substential settlements during the Bronze and Iron Ages include: Tel Dor, Tel Nami, Atlit, Tel Zeror and Tel Zomera.

The Sharon Plain became heavily populated during the Middle Bronze Age, with several major fortified cities established across the plain. Major cities included Tel Afek, Tel Zeror, Tel Burga, and Tel Poleg, which formed part a network of four fortified sites of the Middle Bronze Age in the Sharon Plain.

Tel Zeror, located approximately four kilometers east of modern Hadera, was the first major tel in the Sharon Plain to undergo archeological excavation. Japanese expeditions in the 1960s uncovered a fortified, 50-dunam city with evidence of continuous human habitation throughout multiple ages.

== Cities and regional councils ==
Cities	Regional councils
Netanya (population: 204,000); Herzliya (population: 96,000); Hadera (population: 76,400); Kfar Saba (population: 81,400); Kfar Yona (population: 21,611); Rosh Ha'ayin (population: 37,500); Ra'anana (population: 73,100); Hod HaSharon (population: 58,000); Ramat HaSharon (population: 36,800); Tayibe (population: 33,800); Tira (population: 21,100); Qalansawe (population: 17,300)	Hefer Valley Regional Council; Hof HaSharon Regional Council; Lev HaSharon Regional Council; Southern Sharon Regional Council

== See also ==
- Sarona, a Templar settlement in the Plain of Sharon
