= Tel Tanninim =

Ancient tell on the Mediterranean shore

- תל תנינים (Hebrew)
- Tell al-Milāt / Malāt
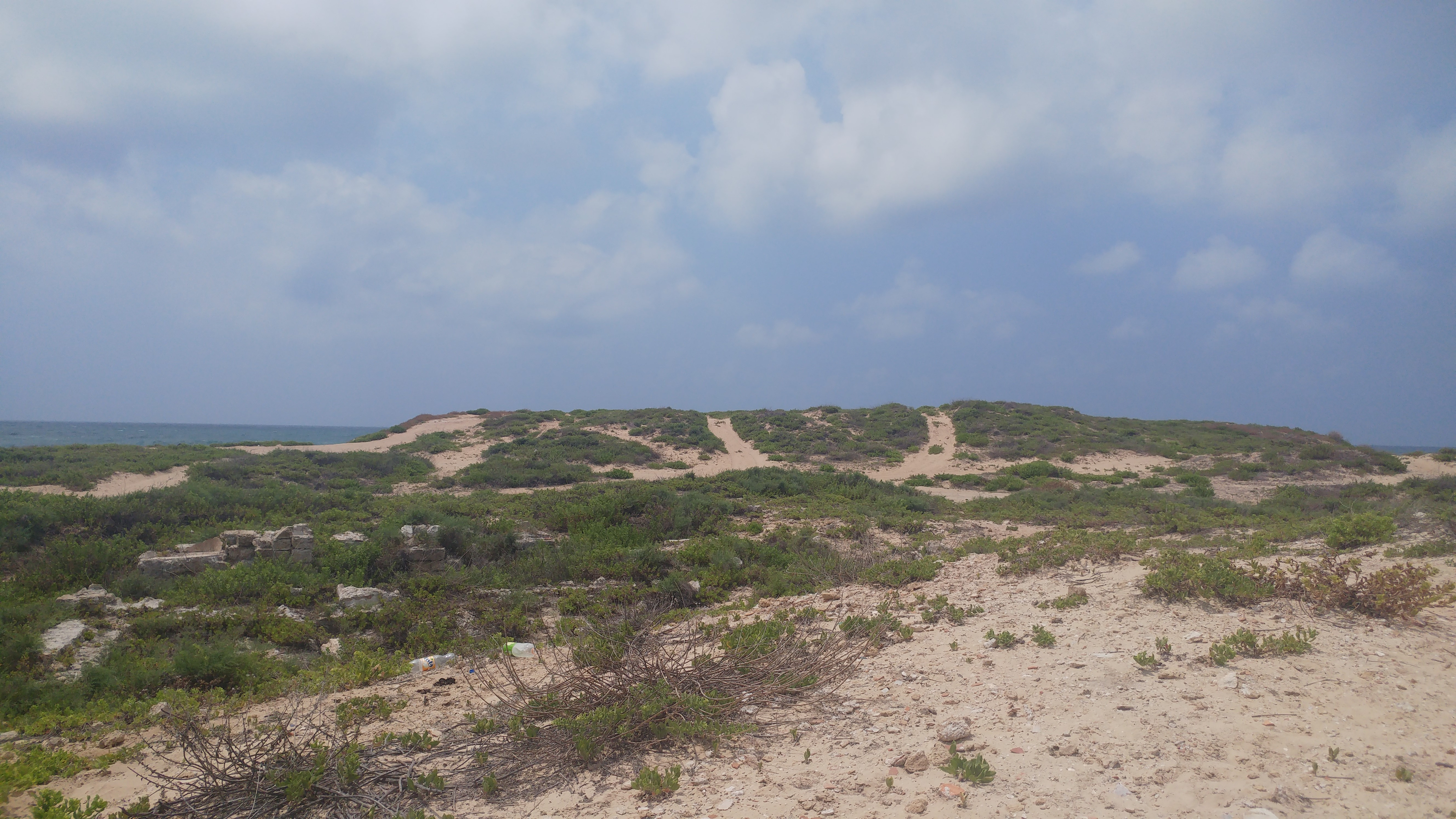
- Tel Tanninim at the mouth of Nahal Tanninim stream

- Location within Israel
- 32°32′19″N 34°54′6″E
- Type: Settlement
- Periods: Persian, Hellenistic, Byzantine, Umayyad, Crusader, Ottoman
- Location: Near Jisr az-Zarka, Israel
- Region: Levant

History
- Abandoned: 1265

Site notes
- Material: Kurkar (aeolian quartz sandstone with carbonate cement)
- Excavation dates: 1979, 1996-1999
- Archaeologists: Robert R. Stieglitz
- Public access: Yes

Tel Tanninim (Hebrew: תל תנינים, lit. 'Crocodiles Mound'), in Arabic Tell al-Milāt (lit. 'Mortar Mound'), is an ancient tell (archaeological mound) on the shore of the Mediterranean, near the mouth of Nahal Tanninim ('Crocodiles Stream'), in the vicinity of the modern Arab town of Jisr az-Zarka, Israel.

== Names ==
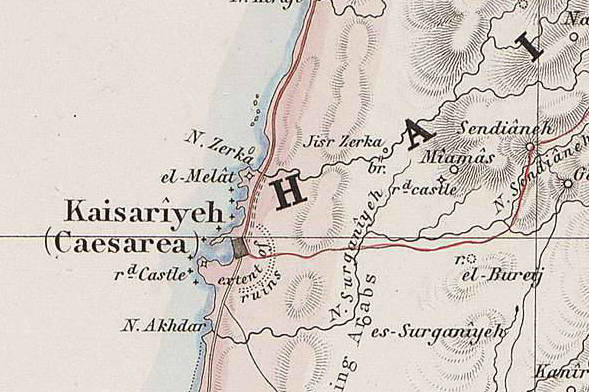
El Melat, just north of Caesarea, in the 1858 van de Velde map of Palestine.

The Modern Hebrew names of the mount and the river hark back to the Nile crocodiles that used to live in the river and the now drained nearby Kabbara swamps until the beginning of the 20th century – tannin (singular) and tanninim meaning crocodile/s in Hebrew. The Greek name of the Hellenistic town was Krokodeilon polis, 'Crocodiles City' (Strabo and Pliny), also spelled Crocodeilopolis or Crocodilopolis.

Migdal Malhā, the Aramaic name from the Byzantine period, as well as the Crusader name, Turris Salinarum, translate to "Saltworks Tower", as does the Arabic correspondent, Burj al-Malih, either referring to the sea salt production, or the salted fish industry developed there. Malh (Arabic: ملح, romanized: milh) means salt.

The Arabic name Al Malat (Arabic: ملاط) means mortar.

== History ==
Archaeological surveys indicate that the mound was occupied from the Persian to the Crusader period, with a gap during the entire Roman period, and intermittent settlement after the Umayyad period until the Crusader resettlement. The first two authors to mention the settlement were the Greek Strabo (63/64 BCE – c. 24 CE) and the Roman Pliny the Elder (23/24–79 CE), both writing during the Roman period.

=== Persian to Umayyad period ===
The first settlement dates to the Persian period (475-332 BCE), when the northern part of the Palestinian coast was given by the Achaemenid emperor to the king of Sidon, a Phoenician vassal with a strong maritime presence. Phoenician pottery is the earliest found at the site, proving that it was the Phoenicians who established the settlement, but the name they used for it is unknown. The town continued after the conquest by Alexander the Great throughout the Hellenistic period, when it was known as Krokodeilon polis, but ceased to exist around 100 BCE.

Strabo writes in his Geographica (published c. 7 BCE–23 CE) that in his time all that remained of the town was its name. A Roman period road passes near the remains of the ancient city. Remains of a Roman bridge which once crossed the stream were still visible as late as the 19th century.

Archaeological excavations found meager remains of a large Early Byzantine church, whose foundation walls served as a base for Late Byzantine, Early Islamic and Crusader buildings. The Jerusalem Talmud mentions the settlement under the Aramaic name Migdal Malhā (Demai 2:1,22c), meaning 'Saltworks Tower', a name preserved in the Latin form, Turris Salinarum, until the Crusader period. In the Byzantine period this was the northernmost settlement of the municipal area of Caesarea, the provincial capital. Substantial remains were unearthed from the Late Byzantine period, including ponds for the breeding of freshwater fish close to the Tel Tanninim Aqueduct, and ponds for saltwater fish closer to the shore. The aqueduct and fish ponds were built in the fourth century and operated continuously until the end of the seventh century, in the Umayyad period.

It seems that the Sasanian invasion of 614, followed by the Muslim conquest (635–40), led to the decline of the Byzantine settlement. A diminished village survived until the late 7th or early 8th century, after which it was abandoned, except for the sporadic but persistent presence of stone robbers from the mid-8th until the 12th century. One recent suggestion is that the earthquake of 749 might have led to the final destruction of the Byzantine-Umayyad settlement. In spite of its natural and strategic advantages, the site was only resettled in the 12th century.

=== Crusader period ===
The remains on the tell from the Crusader period include a small tower, a pool and an aqueduct – the only remains from the Crusader castle of Turris Salinarum ('Saltworks Tower'), Burj al-Malih in Arabic. Researchers suppose that the site was utilised for salt production, giving its name to the Crusader castle. The site became abandoned again during the late Middle Ages.

Hugh Grenier, Lord of Caesarea, donated the tower and its mound to the Knights Hospitaller, and in 1182 the gift was confirmed by his son. It was destroyed by Baibars in 1265.

=== Late Ottoman period ===
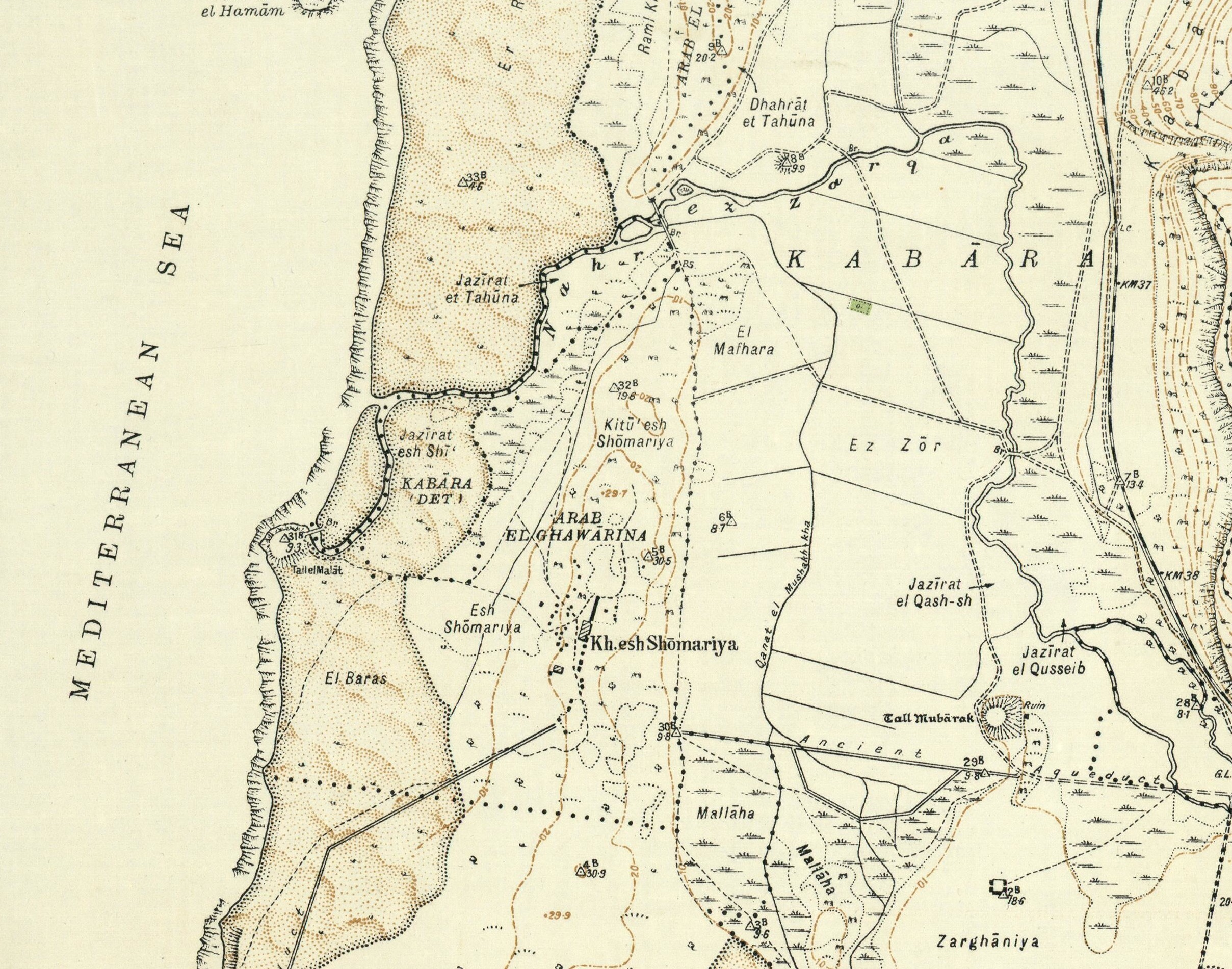
"Tall el Malat" in the Survey of Palestine

In 1898, the Ottoman authorities built a bridge on top of its ruined Roman precursor over the Crocodiles River near the tell, as part of preparations towards the visit of the German Emperor Wilhelm II, who requested to pass with his convoy from Haifa to Jerusalem along the coastline, rather than use the more inland route. In 2020, the meanwhile collapsed Ottoman bridge was restored to its initial form with outmost care for accurate reconstruction.

== Damage and exposure ==
Tel Tanninim was the target of looting in the 1990s, and was again damaged in December 2010 by a heavy winter storm. Archaeological remains at the northern part of the mound are exposed to weathering by the sea, which makes protection and conservation measures necessary. An artificial flood plain was set up on the northern side of the restored Ottoman bridge, in order to protect it from high water levels of Nahal Tanninim, .

== Archaeological research ==
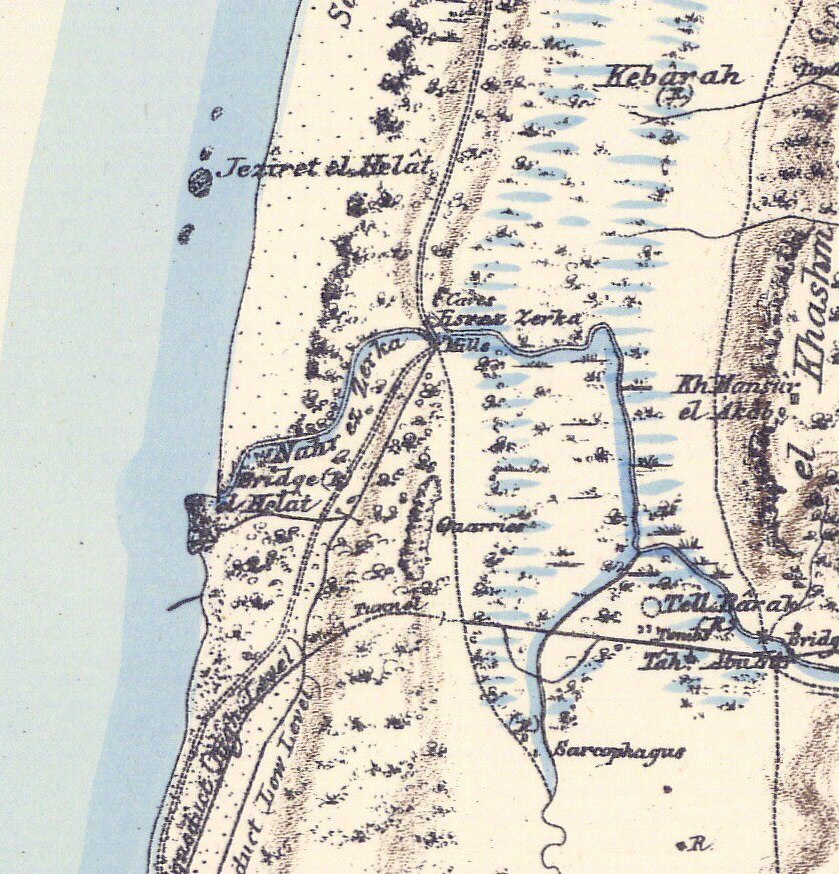
Melat and Zerka in the PEF Survey of Palestine (note the misprint Helat for Melat)

The area, then known as Melat, was examined as part of the PEF's Survey of Western Palestine (1870s). No modern archaeological survey of the tell was performed until 1975. In 2004, additional archaeological surveys were made at the site.

In 1979, a salvage excavation performed along the eroded western edge of the tell brought to light significant Byzantine remains.

Between 1996 and 1999, systematic excavations took place at Tel Tanninim, led by Robert R. Stieglitz of Rutgers University, Newark.

== Access ==
Nowadays, the access to the tell passes via Jisr az-Zarka village.

== See also ==
- Tel Dor
- Caesarea Maritima
