= Four-room house =

Archaeological house-type often associated with early Israelites

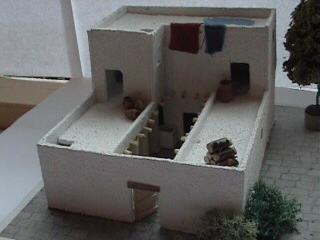
A model of a typical Israelite house, the so-called four-room house.

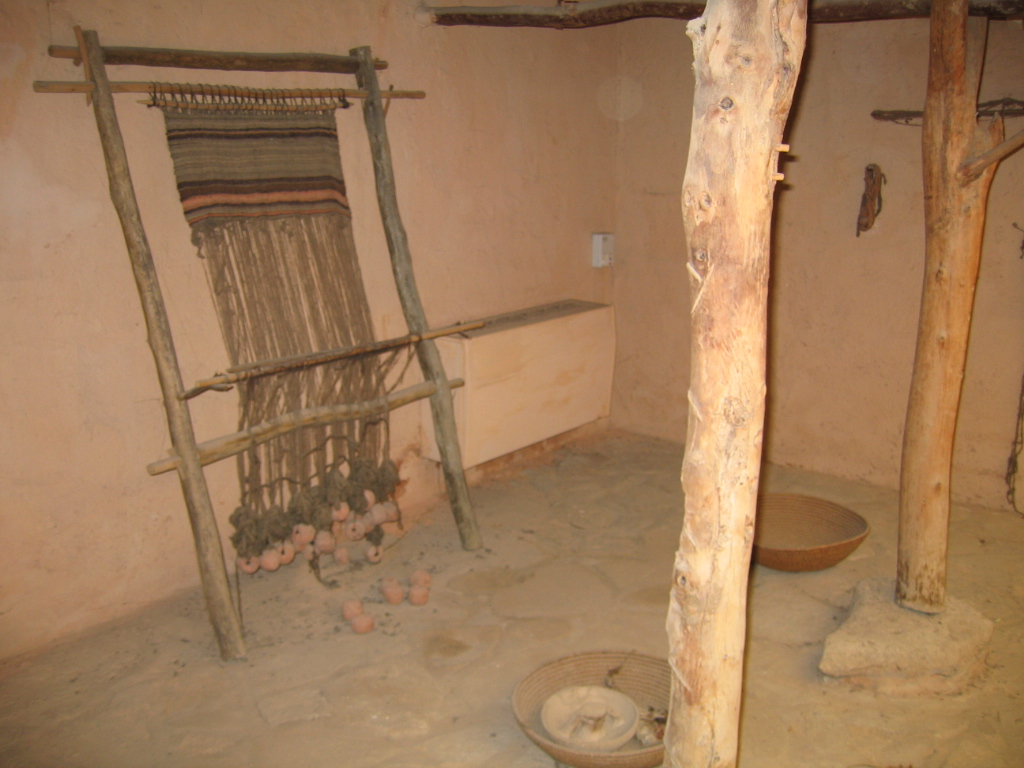
A reconstructed Israelite house, 10th–7th centuries BCE, Eretz Israel Museum, Tel Aviv, Israel

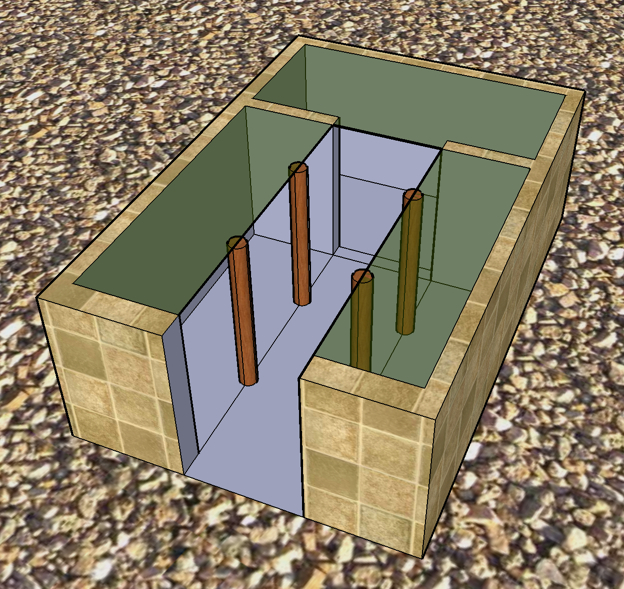
Digital 3D reconstruction of basic space distribution

A four-room house, also known as an "Israelite house" or a "pillared house", is the name given to the mud and stone houses characteristic of the Iron Age of Levant, and most notably, in ancient Israel and Judah.

The four-room house is so named because its floor plan is divided into four sections, although not all four are proper rooms, one often being an unroofed courtyard. It is also sometimes called a pillared house because two—or all three—of the parallel ground-level "rooms" are separated by one—or two, respectively—rows of wooden pillars. The pillars, however, are not the defining feature of the four-room house, and this error of terminology leads to the confusion of four-room houses with other buildings, such as storehouses and stables, where pillars were widely used, but which were not constructed under the four-room house layout. When an upper floor was included, the inhabitants used it as living quarters, while the ground floor was used as a stable for livestock and for storage. There were multiple variations on the basic four-room house. Some had a five-, three-, or two-room layout, and sometimes the rooms were divided by additional walls into smaller areas. Acknowledging these sub-types of the four-room house, the structure's popularity started during the Israelite highland settlement at the beginning of Iron Age I (late 11th century BCE) and dominated the architecture of Israel through Iron Age II until the Babylonian Exile. After the destruction of Judah (of the seventh and sixth centuries BCE) the architecture type was no longer utilized.

== Analysis ==
There have been multiple theories on why the four-room house construction was so popular. Architectural analysis can be made of the residential units by the way they are grouped, the relationship between structures, their size, internal divisions, and the size and structure of the families that inhabited them. Various points can be made about the four-room house pertaining to the culture of their inhabitants. Disparity in house sizes and build quality within towns seem to be a result of socio-economic stratification within cities. Four-roomed houses are found in isolation or built in clusters of grouped units. It can be observed that smaller urban houses, that shared walls between them, were most likely inhabited by nuclear families, while the larger stand-alone houses belonged to extended and wealthy families such as the urban elite. Through the analysis of space syntax within the four-room house, it can be said that the four-room house reflects an egalitarian ideology. The typical four-room house had a layout where all the inner rooms were directly accessible from the house's central space, suggesting that all rooms were equal and there was no hierarchy to the space. The four-room house was unlike the typical Canaanite-Phoenician dwelling, which had a layout where some rooms could be entered only by passing through other rooms, hence showing a hierarchy of access.

Although sometimes considered particularly Israelite, this idea has been challenged. Ziony Zevit writes that although "[t]he Iron Age pillared houses, the "four-room house," are not uniquely Israelite", listing up several Iron Age non-Israelite sites where such houses were found, he nevertheless states that they are unlike the older, "Late Bronze II pillared house discovered at Tel Batash", and finally concludes that, all considered, "they are characteristic of Israelite sites." Their origins are uncertain.

== Building patterns and materials ==
Through archaeological excavations and anthropological studies, it is possible to report on building materials and possible methods used in the construction of the Israelite four-room houses. The Iron I four-room houses typically measured ten to twelve meters long and eight to ten meters wide. The floor plan consists of three axial rooms, connected by one “broadroom" at the rear of the building. Although a majority of houses were not found standing, through analysis it can be concluded that some houses stood two stories tall. Not all four-room houses were stand-alone houses. While some houses were found in isolation, other houses were found with shared walls, and even shared the back broadroom wall with a thicker, outer, defensive city wall. The houses could be constructed in a circular pattern, where the outer city wall connected all back broadroom walls, such as in a combination of the casemate wall and the residential wall. The normal walls were around one meter thick, and were constructed of fieldstones. The exterior defensive walls were thicker. The surfaces of exterior walls were likely plastered to prevent erosion from rainfall, which could be heavy and intense in the winter and spring of the region. The plastering would have demanded a significant quantity of lime to be manufactured, which required a kiln. The floors were composed of beaten earth and flagstone pavement. Finely layered ash and clay helped keep the floors smooth and level. As seen by the sheer volume and weight of all of the stones, wooden pillars, and mudbrick walls used in the construction of the four-room house, it can be said that construction was a team effort that took a lot of energy.

== List of sites with four-room houses ==
Following is a tentative list of Israelite four-room houses at various excavation sites.

- Avaris (Land of Goshen?)
- City of David (Jerusalem)
- Dayr al-Asmar (possible)
- Isbet Sartah
- Lachish
- Mitzpe Ramon
- Tell Abu al-Kharaz
- Tel Arad
- Tel Be'er Sheva (Beersheba)
- Tel Hazor
- Tel Megiddo
- Tel Mevorakh
- Tel Rumeida (Hebron)
- Tel Shikmona
- Tell Qasile

== See also ==
- Architecture of ancient Israel
