= Kabara, Haifa =

Kabara كبارة
- Village
- Etymology: Kebârah, Kebâra, from personal name
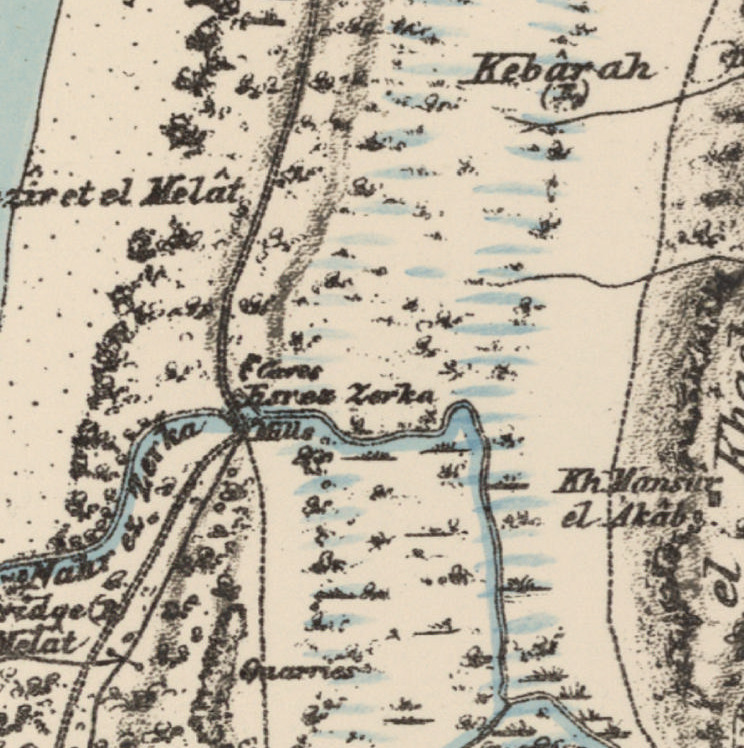
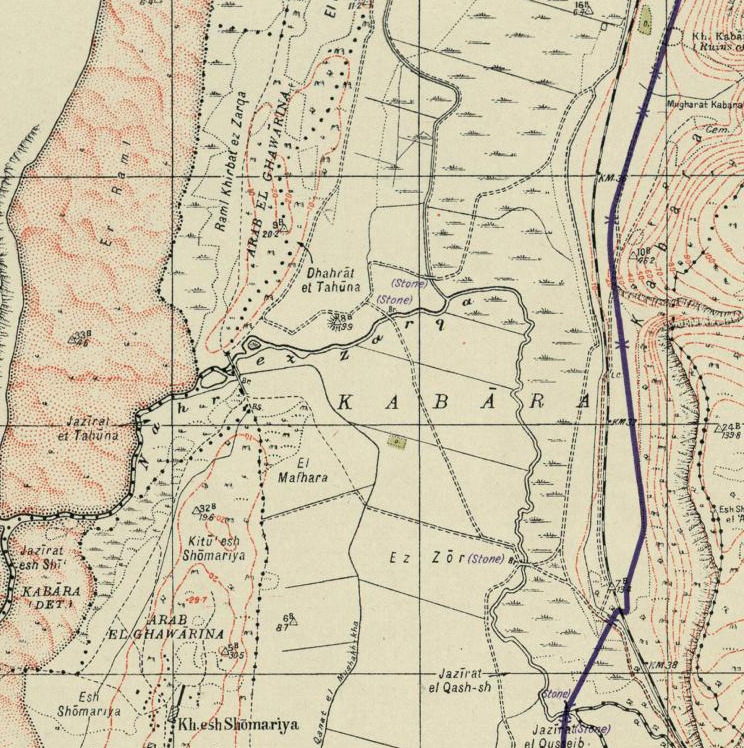
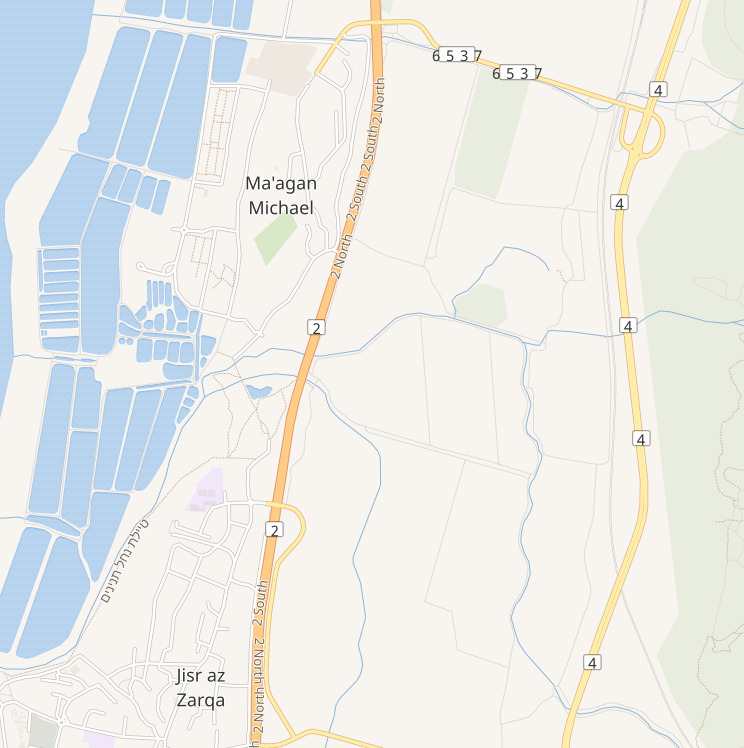
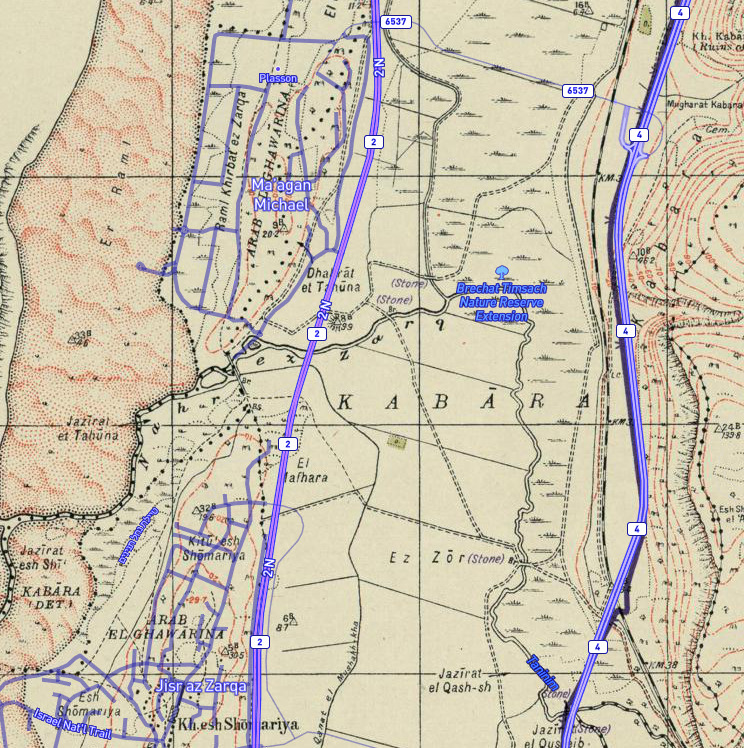
- 1870s map 1940s map modern map 1940s with modern overlay map A series of historical maps of the area around Kabara, Haifa (click the buttons)

- Location within Mandatory Palestine
- Coordinates: 32°32′56″N 34°55′14″E
- Palestine grid: 144/217
- Geopolitical entity: Mandatory Palestine
- Subdistrict: Haifa
- Date of depopulation: April 30, 1948

Population (1945)
  - Total: 120
- Current Localities: Ma'ayan Tzvi, Ma'agan Michael, Beit Hanania

Kabara (Arabic: كبارة), also spelled Kubara, was a Palestinian Arab village in the Haifa Subdistrict. It was depopulated during the 1948 Palestinian expulsions during the 1948 Palestine war on April 30, 1948. It was located 30 km southeast of the city of Haifa.

== History ==
A cave in the vicinity contains artifacts from the Middle Palaeolithic and Natufian periods.

The PEF's Survey of Western Palestine visited in 1873, and noted about Kebarah: "Traces of ruins exist here: a cave, and a tomb with nine kokim, and an ante-chamber and entrance of masonry, with a circular arch of small stones. Near this ruin the wall or dam, built to prevent the spreading north- wards of the marsh surrounding the Zerka, will be found marked on the Sheet, ending in a knoll on the east. The masonry resembles that in the aqueducts at Cæsarea; the stones vary in length, averaging about 2 feet, and are set in cement. The wall is about 4 feet thick, with two rows of ashlar, and thoroughbonds, being built in alternate headers and stretchers. The core of the wall is of rubble."

=== British Mandate era ===
Early in the mandate, a government concession was granted to the Palestine Jewish Colonization Association (PICA) to develop the area. A long-running legal dispute between the Palestinian inhabitants of the area, the Mandatory government, and PICA, continued through the period of the mandate.

In the 1922 census of Palestine conducted by the British Mandate authorities, Kabara had a population of 73 Muslims. In the 1931 census it was counted with Jisr az-Zarqa, together they had a population of 572 Muslims, in a total of 117 houses.

In 1938 the kibbutz of Ma'ayan Tzvi was established on what traditionally had been village land.

In the 1945 statistics it had a population of 120 Muslims, with a total of 9,831 dunams of which Muslims owned 1,070, Jews 3,487 and 5,247 was public land. Of the land, Arabs used 2 dunams for citrus and bananas, 20 for plantations and irrigable land, 1,001 dunums (247 acres) for cereals, while a total of 2,437 dunams was classified as non-cultivable land.

=== 1948 and aftermath ===
According to Walid Khalidi no information is given about how the village became depopulated, but he assumes it was during the second campaign to "clear" the coastal areas of Arabs, that is, in late April, or early May, 1948. Following the war, the area was incorporated into the State of Israel; Ma'agan Michael was established in 1949 and Beit Hanania in 1950, both on village land.

In 1992 the village site was described: "The rubble from the village houses has been moved up the slope where it is now visible, covered with dirt. Cactuses and banana trees, as well as isolated fig, carob, and olive trees grow on the site."

== Bibliography ==
- Barron, J. B., ed. (1923). Palestine: Report and General Abstracts of the Census of 1922. Government of Palestine.
- Conder, C.R.; Kitchener, H.H. (1882). The Survey of Western Palestine: Memoirs of the Topography, Orography, Hydrography, and Archaeology. Vol. 2. London: Committee of the Palestine Exploration Fund.
- Department of Statistics (1945). Village Statistics, April, 1945. Government of Palestine.
- Hadawi, S. (1970). Village Statistics of 1945: A Classification of Land and Area ownership in Palestine. Palestine Liberation Organization Research Center.
- Khalidi, W. (1992). All That Remains: The Palestinian Villages Occupied and Depopulated by Israel in 1948. Washington D.C.: Institute for Palestine Studies. ISBN 0-88728-224-5.
- Mills, E., ed. (1932). Census of Palestine 1931. Population of Villages, Towns and Administrative Areas. Jerusalem: Government of Palestine.
- Morris, B. (2004). The Birth of the Palestinian Refugee Problem Revisited. Cambridge University Press. ISBN 978-0-521-00967-6.
- Palmer, E.H. (1881). The Survey of Western Palestine: Arabic and English Name Lists Collected During the Survey by Lieutenants Conder and Kitchener, R. E. Transliterated and Explained by E.H. Palmer. Committee of the Palestine Exploration Fund.
