= Jisr az-Zarqa =

Arab town in northern Israel

Jisr az-Zarqa: גִ'סְר א-זַּרְקָא; جـِسـْر الزرقاء
- Local council

Hebrew transcription(s)
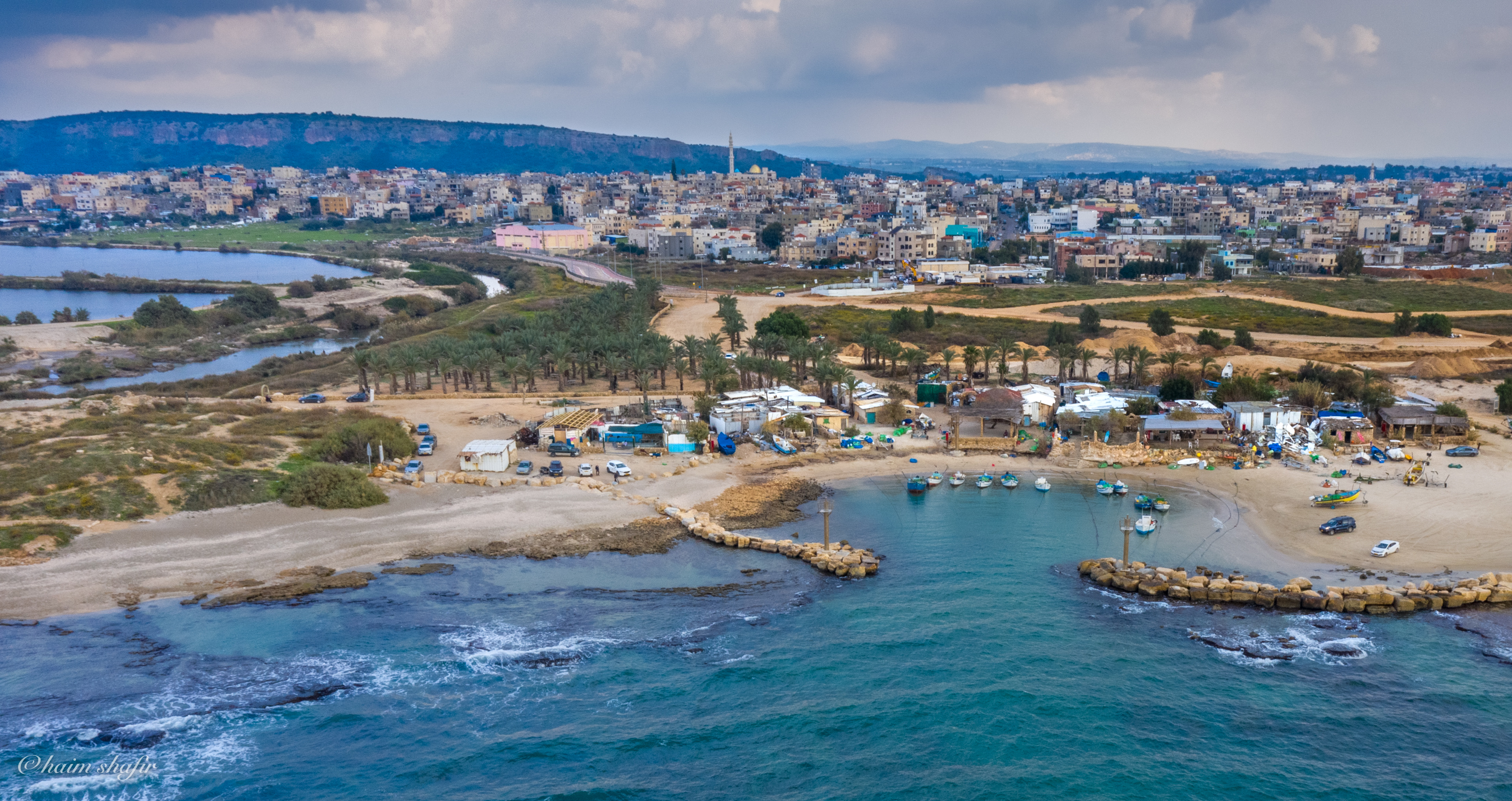
- View of Jisr az-Zarqa

- Location within Haifa region of Israel Location within Israel
- Coordinates: 32°32′17″N 34°54′44″E
- Grid position: 141/217 PAL
- Country: Israel
- District: Haifa
- Subdistrict: Hadera
- Natural Region: Hadera

Government
  - Head of Municipality: Morad Ammash

Area
  - Total: 1,520 dunams (1.52 km^{2}; 0.59 sq mi)

Population (2024)
  - Total: 15,824
  - Density: 10,400/km^{2} (27,000/sq mi)
- Name meaning: The blue bridge (literally; understood to refer to the bridge over the River Zarka)

Jisr az-Zarqa (Arabic: جِسْر الزَّرْقَاء lit. The blue bridge, Hebrew: גִ'סְר א-זַּרְקָא; often shortened as Jisr) is an Israeli Arab town on Israel's northern Mediterranean coastal plain. Located just north of Caesarea within the Haifa District, it achieved local council status in 1963. According to the Central Bureau of Statistics (CBS) the town had a population of 13,689 in 2014, living on 1,500 dunams (1.5 km^{2}) of coastal land. 80% of residents reportedly live below the poverty line. The name Jisr az-Zarqa is a reference to Taninim Stream, which is known in Arabic as the "Blue Wadi" (Wadi az-Zarka). The mayor is Morad Ammash.

Jisr az-Zarqa is the only Arab-majority town in Israel located on the coast of the Mediterranean Sea. It is also the only suriviving Palestinian village inhabited primarily by Ghawarina, or Marsh Arabs.

== History ==
=== Roman and Byzantine Empire ===
Excavations have revealed walls with pottery remains dating from the 1st-century CE, with amphoras dating from the 4th to 7th centuries CE, and remains of a structure carrying a ceramic pipe, most probably dating to the Byzantine era. It has been suggested that the aqueduct in Jisr az-Zarqa is part of the aqueduct ending in Caesarea Maritima, but was never completed.

=== Ottoman Empire ===
In 1882, the PEF's Survey of Western Palestine (SWP) described it: "This is properly speaking a dam rather than a bridge, built across the river so as to form a large pool. There is a causeway on the top of the dam: the height on the west is 20 feet; on the east the level of the water was 3 feet below the roadway. The masonry resembles that of the aqueduct fed from the pool. [..] The eastern face of the dam is cemented. Sluices lined with cement are constructed in the dam. The roadway is 8 feet to 10 feet broad. The work appears to be Roman."

The SWP further noted: "There are small encampments of Arabs who live permanently in the marshes of the river Zerka. They are so strongly posted (the intricate way through the marshes being only known to themselves), that they are almost free from contributions to Government. They are known as 'Arab el Ghawarni."

A population list from about 1887 showed that Guwarnet ez Zerka had about 335 inhabitants, all Muslim. The Ghawarina are a distinct socio-ecological group of Marsh Arabs. The group is of diverse ethnic and geographical origin. The Jurban clan came from Jordan Valley, the 'Ammash from Kafr Qaddum in West Bank, the Egyptian al-Najjar clan from Al Arish in Egypt, the Shihab from the Hauran, and the Tawat-ha and Umbashi black freedpersons from Sudan.

=== British Mandate ===
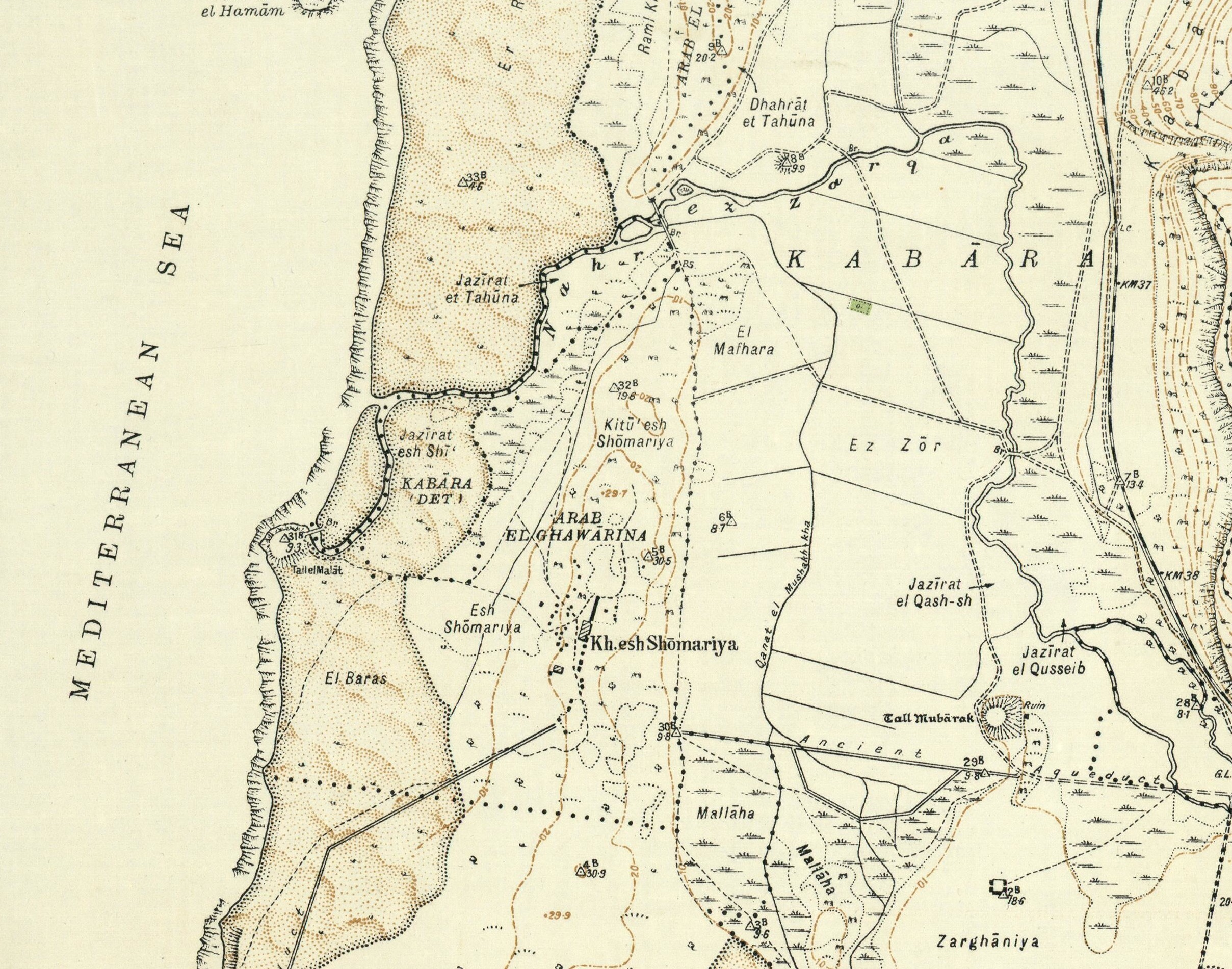
1932 Survey of Palestine map showing the town as Khirbet ash-Shomeriyaa

In the 1922 census of Palestine conducted by the British Mandate authorities, Jisr al Zarqa showed a population of 348 Muslims, increasing in the 1931 census (when it was counted with Kabara) to 572 Muslims, in a total of 117 houses.

In the 1945 statistics the population of Arab el Ghawarina (Jisr Zerqa) was 620, all Muslims, while the total land area was 3,428 dunams, according to an official land and population survey. Of this, 6 were plantations and irrigable land, 674 for grain crops, while 69 dunams were classified as built-up (urban) areas.

Before the establishment of Israel, Jisr was inhabited by Bedouin of the Ghawarina tribe.

=== Israel ===
The intervention of Jews from the neighboring towns of Zikhron Ya'akov and Binyamina, who relied on the population of Jisr az-Zarqa for agricultural labor, prevented the dispersal of its population in 1948.

In 1998, the first multiple kidney transplant in Israel took place between a couple from Jisr az-Zarqa and a Jewish couple from Jerusalem.

In November 2002, the Caesarea Development Corporation constructed a large earthen embankment running the length of the 160 meter-wide corridor between Jisr az-Zarqa and neighboring Caesarea. The embankment was built to block noise from the muezzin in local mosques, celebratory gunfire, and to reduce property crime in surrounding communities. Residents of Jisr az-Zarqa claim that the national park in the north, the embankment to the south, the highway to the east and the sea to the west, are keeping the town from expanding.]

In 2011, a women's leadership program was established in the wake of a similar project in the nearby town of Fureidis, to encourage women's participation in political and public leadership positions.

== Economy ==
In 2020, the Mossawa Center, which advocates for Arab-Israeli rights, stated that 80% of residents live below the poverty line. Unemployment is high, and those who hold down a job on average earn half the national average in terms of income. Additionally, the average income in the village is only about half that of the national average. In 2006 it had the highest school dropout rate in the country, at 12%. By 2020, less than a quarter (23%) of high school students went on to graduate.

Problems of pollution and overfishing in the coastal waters have affected the local economy, and many now work inland. From 20 to 30 buses transport on a daily basis Jisr az-Zarqa residents to jobs, mostly menial, in Haifa, Tel Aviv and elsewhere. The municipality of Jisr az-Zarka is seeking to promote environmental tourism to the town and its beachfront.

The main coastal highway was built without providing an access to the village. However, a new interchange to Jisr az-Zarqa is being planned. The Israel National Trail, a cross-country trail that runs from Dan in the north to Eilat in the south, passes through Jisr az-Zarka.

== Demography ==
Historical population
Year	Pop.	±%
1972	2,700	—
1983	4,800	+77.8%
1995	7,700	+60.4%
2008	12,100	+57.1%
2022	15,418	+27.4%
2024	15,823	+2.6%

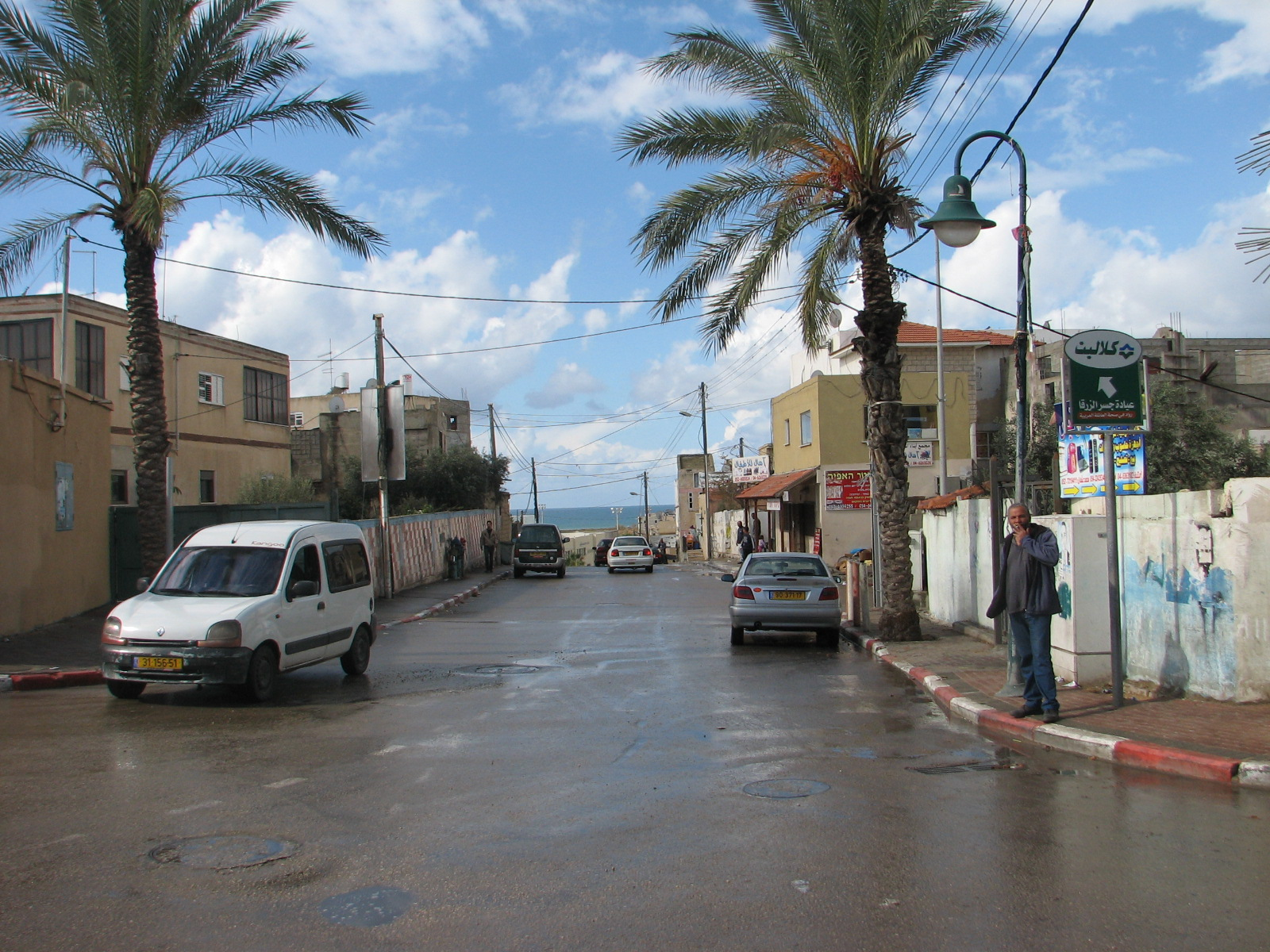
Typical sea-view street in Jisr az-Zarqa

The people of Jisr az-Zarqa belong to the Ghawarna, i.e. people of the Ghor, a plain situated at the lowest end of a drainage system. They come from various places. Some are descendants of Sudanese people brought to work as slaves for neighboring Bedouin tribes.

A local resident, Mariam Amash, applied for a new identity card in Hadera in February 2008, using a birth document issued by the Ottoman Empire showing she was born in 1888. If verified by the Guinness Book of World Records, this would have made her the oldest living person in the world at 120. She died on December 22, 2012, at the age of 124.

== Culture ==
The inhabitants of Jisr az-Zarqa are primarily Muslim.

The film Al Jiser (2004) by Ibtisam Mara'ana examines the lives of residents of Jisr-az Zarka.

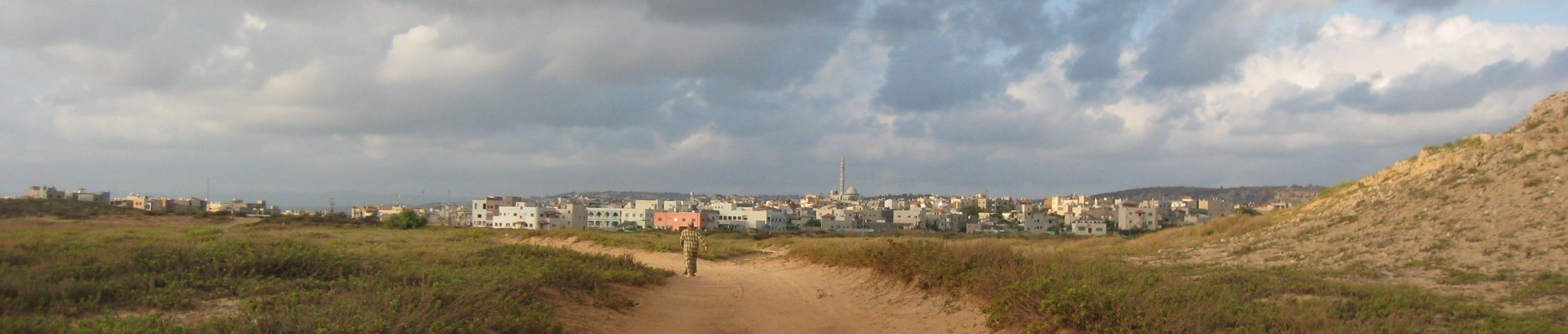
Panoramic view of Jisr az-Zarqa

== Voting Patterns ==
In the 2022 election, 94 percent of voters in Jisr az-Zarqa voted for the Arab parties, while 3 percent voted for the parties of the center-left coalition led by Yair Lapid and 2 percent voted for the parties of the right-wing coalition led by Benjamin Netanyahu. Among the voters for the Arab parties, 44 percent voted for the Hadash–Ta'al list, while 34 percent voted for Ra'am and 22 percent voted for Balad.

In the 2026 election, 96 percent of voters in Jisr az-Zarqa voted for the Arab parties, while 1 percent voted for the parties of the center-left coalition led by Gadi Eisenkot and 0.5 percent voted for the parties of the right-wing coalition led by Benjamin Netanyahu. Among the voters for the Arab parties, 82 percent voted for the Joint List, while 18 percent voted for Ra'am. Voter turnout increased 77 percent from the 2022 election.

== People from Jisr az-Zarqa ==
- Taleb Tawatha
- Mark Gerban

== See also ==
- Arab localities in Israel

== Bibliography ==
- Barron, J.B., ed. (1923). Palestine: Report and General Abstracts of the Census of 1922. Government of Palestine.
- Benveniśtî, M. (2000). Sacred landscape: the buried history of the Holy Land since 1948 (Illustrated ed.). University of California Press. ISBN 0-520-21154-5.
- Conder, C.R.; Kitchener, H.H. (1882). The Survey of Western Palestine: Memoirs of the Topography, Orography, Hydrography, and Archaeology. Vol. 2. London: Committee of the Palestine Exploration Fund.
- Department of Statistics (1945). Village Statistics, April, 1945. Government of Palestine.
- Hadawi, S. (1970). Village Statistics of 1945: A Classification of Land and Area ownership in Palestine. Palestine Liberation Organization Research Center. Archived from the original on 2018-12-08.
- Massarwa, Abdallah (2010-10-03). "Jisr ez-Zarqa Final Report". Hadashot Arkheologiyot – Excavations and Surveys in Israel (122).
- Mills, E., ed. (1932). Census of Palestine 1931. Population of Villages, Towns and Administrative Areas. Jerusalem: Government of Palestine.
- Morris, B. (1994). "8". 1948 and after; Israel and the Palestinians. Oxford University Press. pp. Ghosh and Beit Naqquba, Al Fureidis. ISBN 0-19-827929-9.
- Palmer, E.H. (1881). The Survey of Western Palestine: Arabic and English Name Lists Collected During the Survey by Lieutenants Conder and Kitchener, R. E. Transliterated and Explained by E.H. Palmer. Committee of the Palestine Exploration Fund.
- Sa‘id, Kareem (2009-02-22). "Jisr ez-Zarqa Final Report". Hadashot Arkheologiyot – Excavations and Surveys in Israel (121). Archived from the original on 2011-07-19.
- Schumacher, G. (1888). "Population list of the Liwa of Akka". Quarterly Statement - Palestine Exploration Fund. 20: 169–191.
- Shadman, Amit (2011-06-25). "Jisr ez-Zarqa Final Report". Hadashot Arkheologiyot – Excavations and Surveys in Israel (123).
- Torgë, Hagit (2006-07-09). "Tel Tanninim". Hadashot Arkheologiyot – Excavations and Surveys in Israel (118).
