= Nahal Taninim =

River in Israel

- Wadi az-Zarka
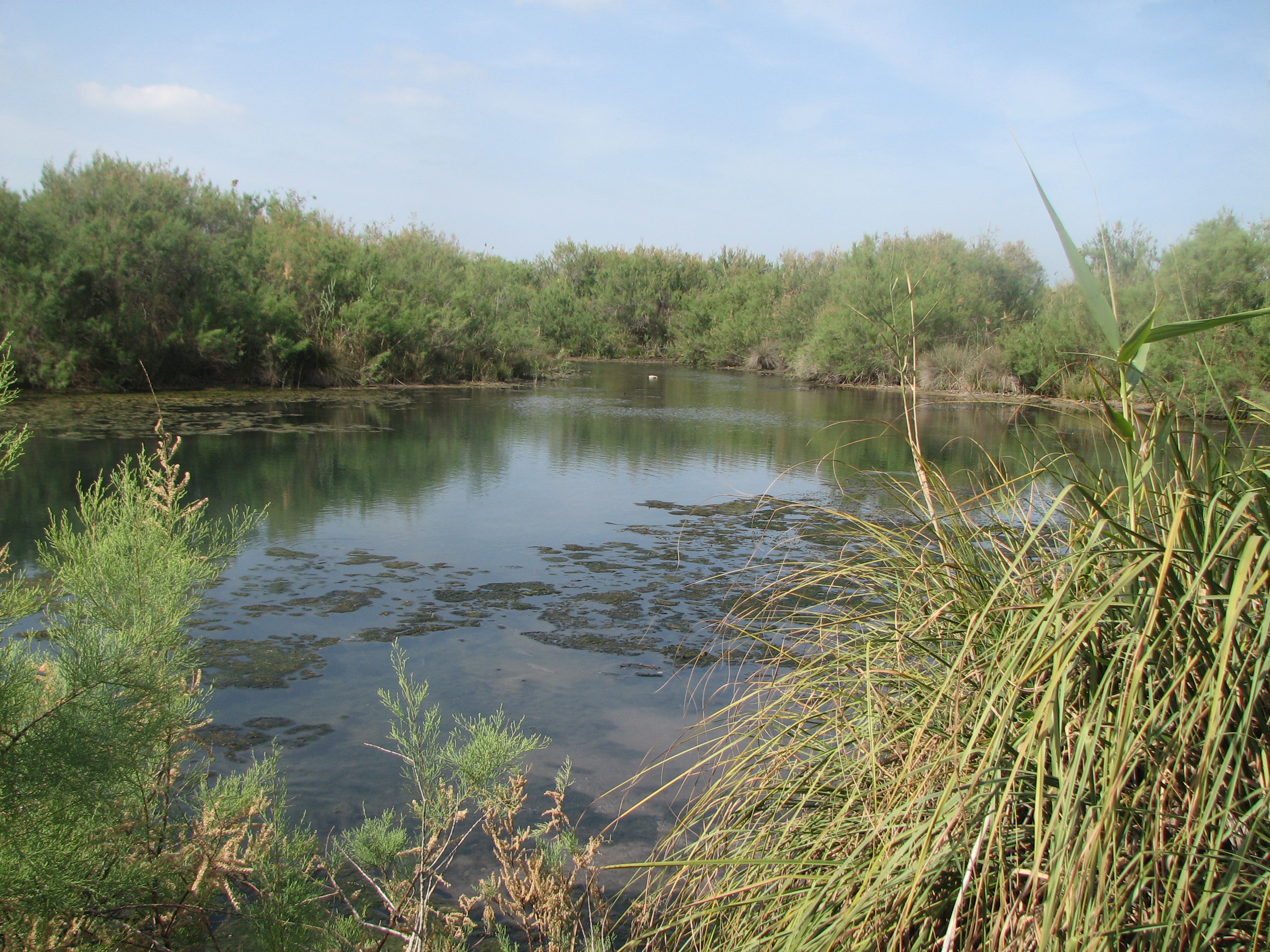
- Nahal Taninim

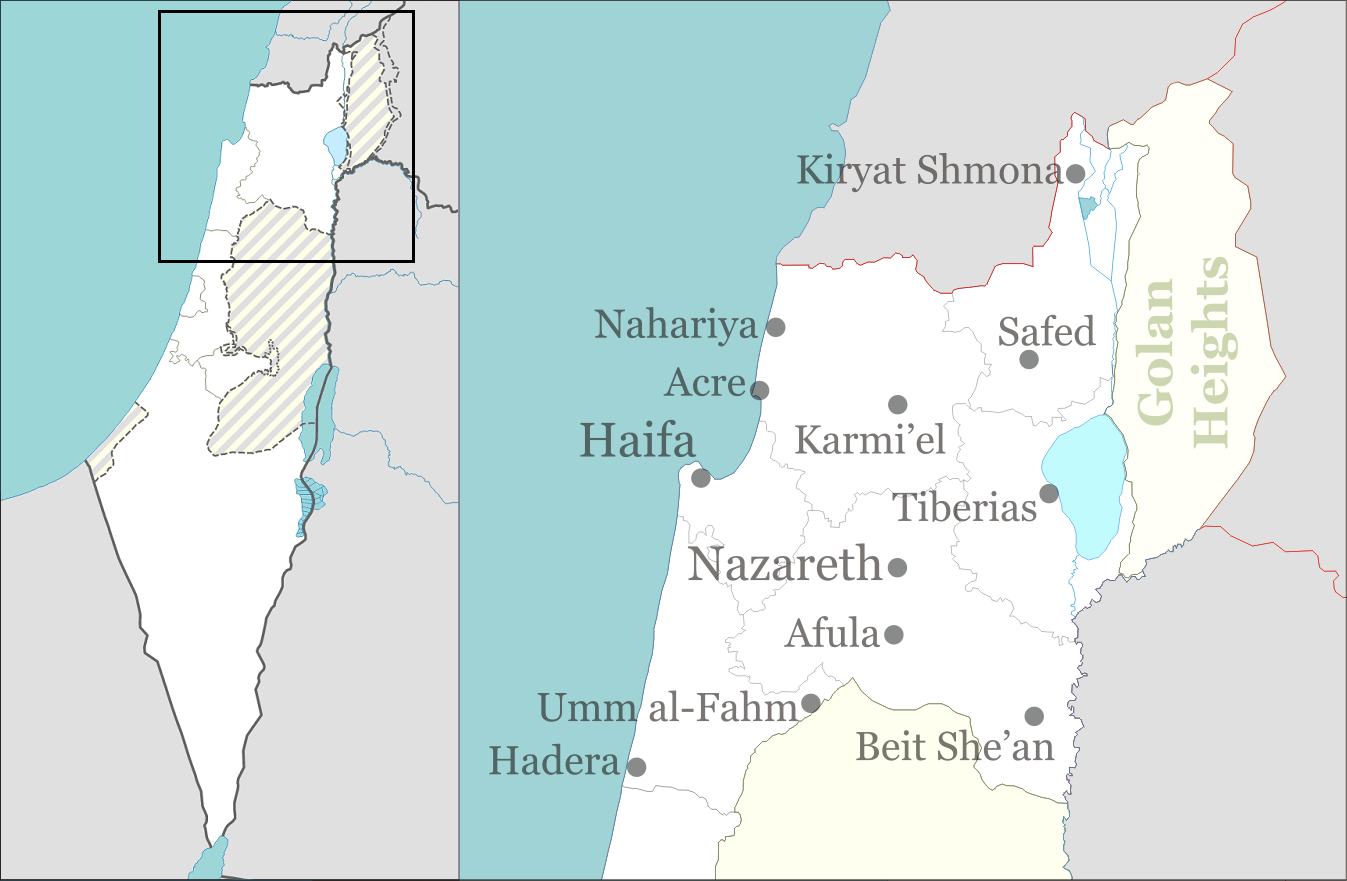
- Location within Northern Haifa region of Israel
- Location: Hof HaCarmel Regional Council, Israel
- Coordinates: 32°32′51″N 34°54′54″E

Nahal Taninim or Tanninim (Hebrew: נחל תנינים, lit. 'Crocodiles Stream') or Wadi az-Zarka (Arabic: وَادِي الزرقاء, lit. 'Blue Stream') is a river in Israel near the Arab town Jisr az-Zarqa, originating near Ramot Menashe and emptying into the Mediterranean Sea south of Ma'agan Michael. It marks the southern limit of the Hof HaCarmel, or Carmel Coastal Plain, region.

There is a dam on the river channel that is used for a nearby power plant. During the rainy season, water from the stream is diverted to a reservoir to enrich the groundwater.

== Etymology ==
The river is named for the Nile crocodiles that inhabited the nearby Kebara swamps until the early 20th century. The last crocodile was hunted in 1912 and is part of a German taxidermic collection currently on display at the natural history museum of the Tel Aviv University.

The remains of Krokodelion polis, Greek for "Crocodiles City", a city established there in the Persian period (5th–4th century BCE), are still visible today.

== History ==
The Late Roman Nahal Tanninim dam, along with a second dam, helped create a huge artificial seasonal lake of c. 6,000 dunams / 1,500 acres, which provided the nearby metropolis of Caesarea with water via an aqueduct. During the Byzantine and Ottoman periods, a series of water-operated flour mills were built along the channel behind the sluice system regulating the water stream exiting the reservoir.

The name River of Crocodiles dates as far back as the Third Crusade, during which the crocodiles devoured two knights who were bathing in the river.

== Hydrology ==
The area of the basin and its tributaries is about 200 square kilometers, including the Taninim, Ada, Barkan, Alona and Mishmarot streams. Nahal Taninim is the cleanest of Israel's coastal rivers. Three waterways meet in Nahal Taninim: the natural stream, a Roman aqueduct extending from the Zabrin springs to Caesarea, and Mifale Menashe, the waterworks that collect surface runoff water and springwater, routing it into the subterranean water table.

== Flora and fauna ==
The dense undergrowth and reeds along Nahal Taninim are home to many different birds, among them waterside warblers and other songbirds.

== See also ==
Directly related:

- Tel Tanninim, a mound at the mouth of the stream holding archaeological remains from various periods
- Tannin, a mythological sea monster in Canaanite and Hebrew mythology

General topics:

- Geography of Israel
- List of rivers of Israel
- National parks and nature reserves of Israel
- Tourism in Israel
- Wildlife of Israel
